= List of airports by ICAO code: SS-SU =

List of airports by ICAO code: A - B - C - D - EB-EG - EH-EY - FA-FM - FN-FZ - G - H - ~~I~~ - J - KA-KH - KI-KP - KR-KZ - LA-LJ - LK-LZ - M - N - O - P - Q - R - SA-SC - SD-SH - SI - SJ - SK-SM - SN-SP - SQ - SS-SU - SV-SY - T - U - V - W - ~~X~~ - Y - Z

== SS - Brazil ==
Also see airport category and list.

ICAO	IATA	Airport name	Community	Coordinates	Notes
SSAA		Unimed Hospital Heliport	Belo Horizonte, Minas Gerais	19°55′19″S 043°55′11″W	
SSAB		Moisés Lupion Airport	Ibaiti, Paraná	23°45′46″S 050°15′47″W	
SSAC		Nova Jerusalém Farm Aerodrome	Sorriso, Mato Grosso	12°35′37″S 055°41′49″W	
SSAD		Ribeirão Farm Aerodrome	Chapadão do Sul, Mato Grosso do Sul	18°45′47″S 052°55′34″W	
SSAE		Arroio Grande Airport	Arroio Grande, Rio Grande do Sul	32°13′45″S 053°03′21″W	
SSAF		Foz do Iguaçu Aeroclub Aerodrome	Santa Terezinha de Itaipu, Paraná	25°22′11″S 054°28′14″W	
SSAG		Lobo Farm Aerodrome	Água Clara, Mato Grosso do Sul	19°43′00″S 052°43′32″W	
SSAH		Sorriso Farm Aerodrome	São Félix do Araguaia, Mato Grosso	11°31′39″S 051°13′23″W	
SSAI		Panamá Farm Aerodrome	Iaciara, Goiás	14°06′17″S 046°47′55″W	
SSAJ		Serra Azul Farm Heliport	Medina, Minas Gerais	16°12′25″S 041°28′18″W	
SSAK		Carlos Ruhl Airport	Cruz Alta, Rio Grande do Sul	28°39′31″S 053°36′41″W	
SSAL		Mostardeiro Heliport	Porto Alegre, Rio Grande do Sul	30°01′40″S 051°12′14″W	
SSAM		Santo André Environmental Protection Station Aerodrome	Barão de Melgaço, Mato Grosso	16°46′21″S 056°10′21″W	
SSAN		João Galdino Airport	Andirá, Paraná	23°01′38″S 050°13′37″W	
SSAO		Olhos d'Água Farm Aerodrome	Baixa Grande, Bahia	12°00′17″S 040°16′23″W	
SSAP	APU	Apucarana Airport	Apucarana, Paraná	23°36′44″S 051°23′06″W	
SSAQ		Passo Fundo Aeroclub Airport	Passo Fundo, Rio Grande do Sul	28°15′02″S 052°31′00″W	
SSAR		SC Araras Heliport	Petrópolis, Rio de Janeiro	22°25′38″S 043°13′01″W	
SSAS		Serrador Building Heliport	Rio de Janeiro, Rio de Janeiro	22°54′43″S 043°10′34″W	
SSAT		Vazante Aerodrome	Vazante, Minas Gerais	17°57′17″S 046°51′40″W	
SSAU		Centeno Aerodrome	Tapes, Rio Grande do Sul	30°44′43″S 051°25′54″W	
SSAV		Amonguijá Farm Aerodrome	Porto Murtinho, Mato Grosso do Sul	21°41′23″S 057°28′30″W	
SSAW		West Gate Heliport	Barueri, São Paulo	23°30′10″S 046°50′53″W	
SSAX		AVL Heliport	Conceição de Macabu, Rio de Janeiro	22°06′02″S 041°46′56″W	
SSAY		Sítio Pouso do Aviador Aerodrome	Campo Grande, Mato Grosso do Sul	20°29′10″S 054°29′00″W	
SSAZ		Stratus Ale Aerodrome	Natal, Rio Grande do Norte	05°44′17″S 035°13′07″W	
SSBA		Arizona Farm Aerodrome	Formosa do Rio Preto, Bahia	11°11′01″S 045°56′50″W	
SSBB		Balada Farm Aerodrome	João Pinheiro, Minas Gerais	17°22′34″S 045°57′00″W	
SSBC		Barra do Tietê Farm Aerodrome	Castilho, São Paulo	20°43′34″S 051°35′19″W	
SSBD		Fiocruz Heliport	Rio de Janeiro, Rio de Janeiro	22°52′48″S 043°14′26″W	
SSBE		Camapuã Aerodrome	Camapuã, Mato Grosso do Sul	19°35′54″S 054°01′16″W	
SSBF		JL Farm Aerodrome	Aparecida do Taboado, Mato Grosso do Sul	20°00′16″S 051°23′12″W	
SSBG		Bento Gonçalves Municipal Airport	Bento Gonçalves, Rio Grande do Sul	29°08′51″S 051°32′27″W	
SSBI		Irmãos Gatto Condominium Aerodrome	Barreiras, Bahia	11°51′11″S 046°18′11″W	
SSBJ		Savana Farm Aerodrome	Riachão das Neves, Bahia	11°33′38″S 045°33′08″W	
SSBK		Araruna Farm Aerodrome	Sonora, Mato Grosso do Sul	17°35′01″S 054°38′28″W	
SSBL	BNU	Blumenau Airport	Blumenau, Santa Catarina	26°49′54″S 049°05′37″W	
SSBM		Lageado Farm	Dois Irmãos do Buriti, Mato Grosso do Sul	20°17′27″S 055°26′50″W	
SSBN		Belém Novo Airport	Porto Alegre, Rio Grande do Sul	30°11′21″S 051°10′57″W	
SSBO		Palmares Aerodrome	Bossoroca, Rio Grande do Sul	28°43′20″S 054°53′27″W	Closed
SSBP		Barigui Park Heliport	Curitiba, Paraná	25°25′52″S 049°18′55″W	
SSBQ		Brusque Farm Aerodrome	Santa Cruz do Xingu, Mato Grosso	10°09′01″S 052°17′11″W	
SSBR		Bandeirantes Airport	Bandeirantes, Paraná	23°04′22″S 050°25′23″W	
SSBS		Selena Farm Aerodrome	Alto Garças, Mato Grosso	16°31′56″S 053°16′41″W	
SSBT		Santa Ilídia Farm Aerodrome	Batayporã, Mato Grosso do Sul	22°19′30″S 053°05′42″W	
SSBU		Baguaçu–Miragem Farm Aerodrome	Porto Murtinho, Mato Grosso do Sul	21°27′17″S 057°08′47″W	
SSBV		Bela Vista Municipal Airport	Bela Vista, Mato Grosso do Sul	22°04′54″S 056°32′19″W	
SSBW		Boa Sorte Farm Aerodrome	Sidrolândia, Mato Grosso do Sul	20°54′47″S 055°00′49″W	
SSBX		Lageado Farm Aerodrome	Coxim, Mato Grosso do Sul	18°26′44″S 054°47′45″W	
SSBY		Orlando Chesini Ometto Aerodrome	Miranda, Mato Grosso do Sul	20°05′57″S 056°47′38″W	
SSBZ	BZC	Umberto Modiano Airport	Armação dos Búzios, Rio de Janeiro	22°46′16″S 041°57′48″W	
SSCA		Pantanal Farm Aerodrome	Chapadão do Sul, Mato Grosso do Sul	18°44′04″S 052°36′17″W	
SSCB		Casa Branca Municipal Airport	Casa Branca, São Paulo	21°47′17″S 047°03′20″W	
SSCC		SC401 Square Corporate Heliport	Florianópolis, Santa Catarina	27°32′04″S 048°30′35″W	
SSCD		Chapadão do Sul Airport	Chapadão do Sul, Mato Grosso do Sul	18°50′21″S 052°29′17″W	
SSCE		Emival Caiado Aerodrome	São José de Mipibu, Rio Grande do Norte	06°00′42″S 035°17′26″W	
SSCF		Max Fontoura Aerodrome	Campo Largo, Paraná	25°25′34″S 049°31′26″W	
SSCG		Orla 62 Heliport	Angra dos Reis, Rio de Janeiro	23°02′19″S 044°11′45″W	
SSCH		Cachoeirão Farm Aerodrome	Nova Andradina, Mato Grosso do Sul	21°35′55″S 053°13′38″W	
SSCI		Coxim Airport	Coxim, Mato Grosso do Sul	18°28′53″S 054°42′57″W	
SSCJ		Celeiro Farm Aerodrome	Rio Brilhante, Mato Grosso do Sul	21°32′30″S 054°39′42″W	
SSCK	CCI	Concórdia Airport	Concórdia, Santa Catarina	27°10′50″S 052°03′04″W	
SSCL		Cassilândia Airport	Cassilândia, Mato Grosso do Sul	19°08′49″S 051°40′35″W	
SSCM		Caçadinha Farm Aerodrome	Rio Brilhante, Mato Grosso do Sul	21°36′56″S 054°47′46″W	
SSCN	CEL	Canela Airport	Canela, Rio Grande do Sul	29°22′14″S 050°49′56″W	
SSCO		Cmt. Marilda Zaiden de Mesquita Aerodrome	Capão do Leão, Rio Grande do Sul	31°46′27″S 052°27′05″W	
SSCP	CKO	Cornélio Procópio Airport	Cornélio Procópio, Paraná	23°09′09″S 050°36′09″W	
SSCQ		Saicã Air Base	Cacequi, Rio Grande do Sul	29°53′59″S 054°55′45″W	
SSCR		Balduino Helmuth Jope Airport	Marechal Cândido Rondon, Paraná	24°30′46″S 054°03′17″W	
SSCS		Continental Square Heliport	São Paulo, São Paulo	23°35′45″S 046°41′02″W	
SSCT	GGH	Gastão Mesquita Airport	Cianorte, Paraná	23°41′30″S 052°38′32″W	
SSCU		Santa Marina Farm Aerodrome	Santa Maria das Barreiras, Pará	08°52′05″S 050°28′46″W	
SSCV		Capivari Aerodrome	Capivari do Sul, Rio Grande do Sul	30°08′05″S 050°30′31″W	
SSCW		Centro Oesta Farm Aerodrome	Nova Maringá, Mato Grosso	13°24′20″S 057°09′04″W	
SSCX		Coxilha Farm Aerodrome	Coxilha, Rio Grande do Sul	28°05′43″S 052°20′09″W	
SSCY		Sikorski Heliport	Campo Largo, Paraná	25°26′19″S 049°26′55″W	
SSCZ		Santa Isabel Hospital Heliport	Blumenau, Santa Catarina	26°55′26″S 049°03′59″W	
SSDA		Água Mansa Heliport	São Sebastião, São Paulo	23°44′29″S 045°24′15″W	
SSDB		Baviera Farm Aerodrome	Itagibá, Bahia	14°07′16″S 039°49′46″W	
SSDC		Caxixe Aerodrome	Venda Nova do Imigrante, Espírito Santo	20°23′20″S 041°04′43″W	
SSDD		Our Lady of Fatima Heliport	Canoas, Rio Grande do Sul	29°55′58″S 051°11′00″W	
SSDE		Cardio Pulmonar Heliport	Salvador, Bahia	13°00′22″S 038°30′01″W	
SSDF		Ecides Fires Aerodrome	São Sebastião do Passé, Bahia	12°31′02″S 038°30′01″W	
SSDG		Our Lady of Grace Farm Aerodrome	Sorriso, Mato Grosso	12°53′47″S 055°50′04″W	
SSDH		Chapadão Alegre Farm Aerodrome	Correntina, Bahia	13°25′56″S 045°18′04″W	
SSDI		Bacatuba Farm Aerodrome	Buriti Bravo, Maranhão	05°39′30″S 043°42′20″W	
SSDJ		Dias Branco Heliport	Fortaleza, Ceará	03°44′43″S 038°30′00″W	
SSDK		São Pedro Aerodrome	Igaratinga, Minas Gerais	20°04′33″S 044°43′42″W	
SSDL		Ribeirão Farm Aerodrome	Ribeiro Gonçalves, Piauí	08°00′31″S 045°19′59″W	
SSDM		Serinhaém Farm Aerodrome	Ituberá, Bahia	13°50′10″S 038°59′21″W	
SSDN		Nova Fonteira Farm Aerodrome	Barreiras do Piauí, Piauí	10°19′21″S 045°59′03″W	
SSDO		São Pedro Aerodrome	Porto Seguro, Bahia	16°45′14″S 039°18′59″W	
SSDP		Fortaleza do Guaporé Farm Aerodrome	Vila Bela da Santíssima Trindade, Mato Grosso	14°27′49″S 060°10′30″W	
SSDQ		Marema Farm Aerodrome	Miranda, Mato Grosso do Sul	20°11′02″S 056°38′12″W	
SSDR		Copa DOR Hospital Heliport	Rio de Janeiro, Rio de Janeiro	22°57′56″S 043°11′25″W	
SSDS		Bandeirantes Farm Aerodrome	Nova Crixás, Goiás	13°42′26″S 050°38′52″W	Closed
SSDT		Pau D'Arco Farm Aerodrome	Redenção, Pará	07°56′37″S 050°10′35″W	
SSDU		Duas Lagoas Farm Aerodrome	Cáceres, Mato Grosso	16°09′47″S 058°11′02″W	
SSDV		Santa Maria Farm Aerodrome	Corumbá, Mato Grosso do Sul	18°12′34″S 055°27′56″W	
SSDW		Potrich Farm Aerodrome	Sorriso, Mato Grosso do Sul	12°54′56″S 055°32′08″W	
SSDX		Fazenda da Coxilha Aerodrome	Camaquã, Rio Grande do Sul	31°00′00″S 051°42′02″W	
SSDY		Duas Irmãs Farm Aerodrome	Guiratinga, Mato Grosso	16°09′24″S 053°00′35″W	
SSDZ		Requinte Farm Aerodrome	São Desidério, Bahia	12°48′19″S 046°08′34″W	
SSEA		SESC Serra Azul Aerodrome	Rosário Oeste, Mato Grosso	14°28′36″S 055°42′45″W	
SSEB		Mata Serena Aerodrome	São Domingos, Goiás	13°46′24″S 046°46′13″W	
SSEC		F5 Farm Aerodrome	Tupaciguara, Minas Gerais	18°21′49″S 048°52′17″W	
SSED		Escalada Farm Aerodrome	Pedro Gomes, Mato Grosso do Sul	17°57′53″S 054°25′50″W	
SSEE		Vale do Taquari Regional Airport	Estrela, Rio Grande do Sul	29°27′18″S 051°56′10″W	
SSEF		Passaredo Farm Aerodrome	Cajuru, São Paulo	21°19′37″S 047°13′52″W	
SSEG		Sementes Guerra Aerodrome	Renascença, Paraná	26°17′24″S 052°56′14″W	
SSEH		Pantera Farm Aerodrome	Alto Taquari, Mato Grosso	17°57′10″S 053°14′46″W	
SSEJ		Moinho Velho Heliport	Embu das Artes, São Paulo	23°37′34″S 046°50′44″W	
SSEK		Lontra Farm Aerodrome	Ribas do Rio Pardo, Mato Grosso do Sul	20°01′04″S 053°15′09″W	
SSEL		ANAMI Heliport	São José dos Pinhais, Paraná	25°35′34″S 049°11′04″W	
SSEM		Girassol do Prata Farm Aerodrome	Santo Antônio do Leverger, Mato Grosso	16°12′24″S 055°17′43″W	
SSEN		Bainho de Baixo Aerodrome	Barão de Melgaço, Mato Grosso	16°44′03″S 055°44′22″W	
SSEO		MS Maragogi Heliport	Maragogi, Alagoas	09°01′23″S 035°13′30″W	
SSEP		São Sepé Airport	São Sepé, Rio Grande do Sul	30°10′56″S 053°34′46″W	
SSEQ		Renascer Aerodrome	Arame, Maranhão	04°47′03″S 045°50′42″W	Closed
SSER	ERM	Erechim Airport	Erechim, Rio Grande do Sul	27°39′48″S 052°16′19″W	
SSES		Hemmer Heliport	Blumenau, Santa Catarina	26°53′04″S 049°08′18″W	
SSET		Sunset Aerodrome	Imbituba, Santa Catarina	28°10′46″S 048°40′58″W	
SSEU		Tabocal Aerodrome	Itaituba, Pará	07°16′58″S 056°34′55″W	
SSEV		São Camilo Farm Aerodrome	Corumbá, Mato Grosso do Sul	18°05′14″S 057°07′53″W	
SSEW		Sítio Limoeiro Aerodrome	Pardinho, São Paulo	23°08′44″S 048°18′35″W	
SSEX		Caiman Estate Aerodrome	Miranda, Mato Grosso do Sul	19°58′08″S 056°18′42″W	
SSEY		Umburanas Farm Heliport	Ibicuí, Bahia	14°31′46″S 039°51′45″W	
SSEZ		Espumoso Airport	Espumoso, Rio Grande do Sul	28°44′17″S 052°51′20″W	
SSFA		Foz do Areia Aerodrome	Pinhão, Paraná	25°58′54″S 051°38′27″W	
SSFB	FBE	Paulo Abdala Airport	Francisco Beltrão, Paraná	26°03′32″S 053°03′48″W	
SSFC		Safra Aerodrome	Dom Pedrito, Rio Grande do Sul	31°01′21″S 054°37′18″W	
SSFD		Acarajá Farm Aerodrome	Amambai, Mato Grosso do Sul	23°00′04″S 054°41′58″W	
SSFE		Hércules Estate Aerodrome	Foz do Iguaçu, Paraná	25°27′39″S 054°35′54″W	
SSFF		Pitangueira Heliport	Agrolândia, Santa Catarina	27°22′34″S 049°49′50″W	
SSFG		Guanabara Farm Aerodrome	Corumbá, Mato Grosso do Sul	18°13′52″S 055°45′04″W	
SSFH		Vale dos Dinossauros Aerodrome	Uberaba, Minas Gerais	19°47′07″S 047°48′42″W	
SSFI		Eldorado da Formosa Farm Aerodrome	Corumbá, Mato Grosso do Sul	17°54′31″S 056°33′58″W	
SSFJ		Retiro da Cachoeira Farm Aerodrome	Campo Grande, Mato Grosso do Sul	20°48′39″S 054°37′05″W	
SSFK		Forte Coimbra Air Base	Corumbá, Mato Grosso do Sul	19°54′22″S 057°46′46″W	
SSFL		João Pereira dos Santos Filho Airport	Fronteiras, Piauí	07°06′00″S 040°37′37″W	
SSFM		Montani Farm Aerodrome	Baixa Grande do Ribeiro, Piauí	08°01′26″S 044°53′32″W	
SSFN		Nazaré Farm Aerodrome	Corumbá, Mato Grosso do Sul	18°40′25″S 057°07′24″W	
SSFO		Novo Horizonte Farm Aerodrome	Miranda, Mato Grosso do Sul	20°01′35″S 056°19′16″W	
SSFP		Porto Rancho Farm Heliport	Santa Cruz Cabrália, Bahia	16°22′25″S 039°19′13″W	
SSFR		18 do Forte Empresarial Heliport	Barueri, São Paulo	23°29′02″S 046°51′24″W	
SSFS		Sapezal Farm Aerodrome	Sapezal, Mato Grosso	13°19′57″S 058°46′56″W	
SSFT		Nanete Têxtil Heliport	Jaraguá do Sul, Santa Catarina	26°32′10″S 049°07′35″W	
SSFU		Antonio Furlaneto Aerodrome	Dom Eliseu, Pará	04°26′08″S 047°35′55″W	
SSFV		Vivieiros Farm Aerodrome	Pirapora, Minas Gerais	17°29′12″S 044°57′32″W	
SSFW		Progresso Farm Aerodrome	Mucugê, Bahia	13°09′26″S 041°30′26″W	
SSFX		Primavera Farm Aerodrome	Nova Fátima, Paraná	23°27′26″S 050°34′53″W	
SSFY		Furnas Centrais Elétricas Heliport	Foz do Iguaçu, Pará	25°28′24″S 054°32′31″W	
SSFZ		Carolina Farm Aerodrome	Buritis, Minas Gerais	15°35′41″S 046°36′12″W	
SSGA		Garibaldi Airport	Garibaldi, Rio Grande do Sul	29°16′06″S 051°31′56″W	
SSGB	GTB	Guaratuba Airport	Guaratuba, Paraná	25°52′50″S 048°36′44″W	
SSGC		Chapadão Farm Aerodrome	Santo Antônio do Leverger, Mato Grosso	15°49′16″S 055°59′57″W	
SSGD		Porta do Céu Farm Aerodrome	Jaborandi, Bahia	14°06′56″S 045°50′20″W	
SSGE		Periquitos Farm Aerodrome	Três Lagoas, Mato Grosso do Sul	20°30′06″S 051°49′59″W	
SSGF		Formosa Farm Aerodrome	Ribas do Rio Pardo, Mato Grosso do Sul	20°11′50″S 053°13′25″W	
SSGG	GPB	Guarapuava Airport	Guarapuava, Paraná	25°23′17″S 051°31′18″W	Formerly SBGU
SSGH		Capão Verde Farm Aerodrome	Aquidauana, Mato Grosso do Sul	20°04′26″S 056°04′24″W	
SSGI		LC Corporate Green Tower Heliport	Fortaleza, Ceará	03°43′36″S 038°30′16″W	
SSGJ		Poleiro Grande Farm Aerodrome	Corumbá, Mato Grosso do Sul	17°15′01″S 056°16′28″W	
SSGK		Betim Regional Public Hospital Heliport	Betim, Minas Gerais	19°56′52″S 044°11′23″W	
SSGL		FNSC Agronegocios Aerodrome	Sorriso, Mato Grosso	12°24′31″S 055°56′06″W	
SSGM		Seriema Farm Aerodrome	Bela Vista, Mato Grosso do Sul	21°41′36″S 056°33′45″W	
SSGN		Guaíba Farm Aerodrome	Iguatemi, Mato Grosso do Sul	23°14′08″S 054°32′24″W	
SSGO		Rosada Aerodrome	São Gabriel do Oeste, Mato Grosso do Sul	19°25′45″S 054°35′16″W	
SSGP		Piquet Aerodrome	Brasília, Federal District	15°51′16″S 047°48′34″W	
SSGQ		Capivari Farm Aerodrome	Rio Brilhante, Mato Grosso do Sul	21°46′00″S 054°19′24″W	
SSGR		Guaporé Airport	Guaporé, Rio Grande do Sul	28°53′41″S 051°51′19″W	Closed
SSGS		São Pedro Farm Aerodrome	Eldorado, Mato Grosso do Sul	23°39′51″S 054°04′46″W	
SSGT		Capão Alto Farm Aerodrome	Rio Brilhante, Mato Grosso do Sul	21°41′56″S 054°48′50″W	
SSGU		Gurucaia Farm Aerodrome	Santa Isabel do Ivaí, Paraná	23°11′11″S 053°19′35″W	
SSGV		Sorocred Heliport	Votorantim, São Paulo	23°33′24″S 047°28′40″W	
SSGW		Manoel Ribas Airport	Goioerê, Paraná	24°13′11″S 053°02′38″W	
SSGX		Guacho Aerodrome	Santa Cruz do Rio Pardo, São Paulo	22°49′01″S 049°22′46″W	
SSGY	GGJ	Guaíra Airport	Guaíra, Paraná	24°04′47″S 054°11′17″W	
SSGZ		Santa Helena do Pindó Farm Aerodrome	Naviraí, Mato Grosso do Sul	22°53′42″S 053°52′04″W	
SSHA		Aquidauana Aeroclub Aerodrome	Aquidauana, Mato Grosso do Sul	20°28′51″S 055°46′10″W	
SSHB		Boris Aerodrome	Luís Eduardo Magalhães, Bahia	12°04′06″S 045°49′43″W	
SSHC		Alvemi Farm Aerodrome	Paranaíba, Mato Grosso do Sul	19°24′38″S 051°07′54″W	
SSHD		Chico Ledur Aerodrome	Alegrete, Rio Grande do Sul	29°49′05″S 055°42′51″W	
SSHE		Nova Guaporé Farm Aerodrome	Comodoro, Mato Grosso	13°54′21″S 060°19′23″W	
SSHF		Gerais Farm Aerodrome	Formosa do Rio Preto, Bahia	10°40′43″S 045°50′00″W	
SSHG		Santa Helena Farm Aerodrome	Rio Pardo, Rio Grande do Sul	30°08′09″S 052°37′44″W	
SSHH		Helisul I Heliport	Foz do Iguaçu, Paraná	25°36′32″S 054°29′37″W	
SSHI		IURD Heliport	Curitiba, Paraná	25°26′32″S 049°15′41″W	
SSHJ		HC Heliport	Osasco, São Paulo	23°32′02″S 046°46′56″W	
SSHK		Jaguarundy Farm Aerodrome	Ponta Porã, Mato Grosso do Sul	22°35′13″S 055°34′53″W	
SSHL		Jussara Farm Aerodrome	Jussara, Paraná	23°34′30″S 052°24′41″W	
SSHM		Moinhos de Vento Hospital Heliport	Porto Alegre, Rio Grande do Sul	30°01′35″S 051°12′33″W	
SSHN		Recanto das Águias Aerodrome	Iguaraçu, Paraná	23°14′44″S 051°52′34″W	
SSHO		Santa Rita Hospital Heliport	Santa Rita, Paraíba	07°07′34″S 034°56′48″W	
SSHP		Paiol do Piquiri Farm Aerodrome	Goioxim, Paraná	25°02′50″S 051°55′23″W	
SSHQ		Sossego Farm Aerodrome	Rosana, São Paulo	22°21′06″S 052°40′27″W	
SSHR		Horus Heliport	Joinville, Santa Catarina	26°19′55″S 048°50′53″W	Closed
SSHS		Helisul IV Heliport	Foz do Iguaçu, Paraná	25°36′47″S 054°28′53″W	
SSHT		Ingazeira Aerodrome	Alta Floresta, Mato Grosso	10°07′54″S 056°43′02″W	
SSHU		Centenário Farm Aerodrome	Aquidauana, Mato Grosso do Sul	19°27′24″S 056°03′25″W	
SSHV		Genipapo Farm Aerodrome	Várzea da Palma, Minas Gerais	17°43′27″S 044°36′56″W	
SSHW		Nova Esperança Farm Aerodrome	Recursolândia, Tocantins	08°33′11″S 047°05′09″W	
SSHX		Jatobá Farm Aerodrome	Paranhos, Mato Grosso do Sul	23°55′30″S 055°17′59″W	
SSHY		Cajuru University Hospital Heliport	Curitiba, Paraná	25°26′11″S 049°14′42″W	
SSHZ		Walter Bündchen Airport	Horizontina, Rio Grande do Sul	27°38′18″S 054°20′20″W	
SSIA		Ipê Farm Aerodrome	Baixa Grande do Ribeiro, Piauí	08°25′41″S 045°18′30″W	
SSIB		Ages Bonfim Heliport	Senhor do Bonfim, Bahia	10°31′01″S 040°08′46″W	
SSIC		APLIC Aviação Agrícola Aerodrome	Dourados, Mato Grosso do Sul	22°18′24″S 054°49′28″W	
SSID		Independencia Airport	Nova Andradina, Mato Grosso do Sul	22°16′45″S 053°23′01″W	
SSIE		Teruel Ipanema Estate Airport	Campo Grande, Mato Grosso do Sul	20°36′14″S 054°35′43″W	
SSIF		Baunilha Farm Aerodrome	Itaquiraí, Mato Grosso do Sul	23°33′45″S 054°01′49″W	
SSIG		Isogama Heliport	São José dos Pinhais, Paraná	25°38′00″S 049°09′40″W	Closed
SSIH		Marchesi Heliport	Ribeirão Preto, São Paulo	21°13′28″S 047°47′44″W	
SSII		Teuto Heliport	Leopoldo de Bulhões, Goiás	16°24′23″S 048°54′59″W	
SSIJ	IJU	João Batista Bos Filho Airport	Ijuí, Rio Grande do Sul	28°22′07″S 053°50′47″W	
SSIK		Vivo Heliport	Santana de Parnaíba, São Paulo	23°27′56″S 046°51′28″W	Closed
SSIL		Blau Pharmaceutical Heliport	Cotia, São Paulo	23°35′53″S 046°53′52″W	
SSIM	CCM	Diomício Freitas Airport	Criciúma / Forquilhinha, Santa Catarina	28°43′33″S 049°25′29″W	Formerly SBCM
SSIN		Sítio Costa dos Calhaus Heliport	Paraty, Rio de Janeiro	23°13′01″S 044°37′59″W	
SSIO		Conquista Farm Aerodrome	Santa Carmem, Mato Grosso	11°59′42″S 054°40′50″W	
SSIP		Interpolos Heliport	Timbó, Santa Catarina	26°50′52″S 049°16′03″W	
SSIQ		Itaqui Airport	Itaqui, Rio Grande do Sul	29°10′19″S 056°32′18″W	
SSIR		Ibirubá Airport	Ibirubá, Rio Grande do Sul	28°36′15″S 053°04′43″W	
SSIS		Major José Ignácio Aerodrome	Ibaté, São Paulo	22°03′05″S 048°05′47″W	
SSIT		Toca do Lobo Ranch Aerodrome	Nova Olímpia, Mato Grosso	14°39′38″S 057°17′28″W	
SSIU		Issaig I Heliport	Içara, Santa Catarina	28°42′05″S 049°18′07″W	
SSIV		Delta Heliport	São José de Ribamar, Maranhão	02°28′40″S 044°11′02″W	
SSIW		Itamar Musse Heliport	Lauro de Freitas, Bahia	12°52′29″S 038°19′00″W	
SSIX		Santa Cláudia Farm Heliport	Mairipotaba, Goiás	17°10′32″S 049°30′32″W	
SSIY		Três Irmãos Farm Aerodrome	Novo Progresso, Pará	09°20′44″S 055°53′05″W	
SSIZ		Grama Farm Condominium Heliport	Itupeva, São Paulo	23°03′33″S 047°03′45″W	
SSJA	JCB	Joaçaba Airport	Joaçaba, Santa Catarina	27°10′22″S 051°33′06″W	
SSJB		Vaca Branca Farm Aerodrome	Naviraí, Mato Grosso do Sul	23°03′58″S 053°49′16″W	
SSJC		Jacarezinho Aerodrome	Valparaíso, São Paulo	21°08′30″S 050°53′59″W	
SSJD		Bacaba–JEM Farm Aerodrome	Miranorte, Tocantins	09°31′44″S 048°46′38″W	
SSJE		Emphos Heliport	São José, Santa Catarina	27°35′14″S 048°36′41″W	
SSJF		Curitiba Federal Police Heliport	Curitiba, Paraná	25°22′34″S 049°13′40″W	
SSJG		Santa Ana Farm Aerodrome	Porto Murtinho, Mato Grosso do Sul	21°13′18″S 057°40′58″W	
SSJH		Ninho do Condor Heliport	Nova Iguaçu, Rio de Janeiro	22°39′52″S 043°29′31″W	
SSJI		Jardim Airport	Jardim, Mato Grosso do Sul	21°29′34″S 056°09′09″W	
SSJJ		Brejon Farm Aerodrome	Camapuã, Mato Grosso do Sul	19°23′00″S 053°41′33″W	
SSJK		Júlio de Castilhos Airport	Júlio de Castilhos, Rio Grande do Sul	29°09′11″S 053°44′36″W	
SSJL		Murará Farm Aerodrome	Bonfim, Roraima	03°14′44″N 060°14′19″W	
SSJM		Júlio Martins Farm Aerodrome	Chapadão do Sul, Mato Grosso do Sul	18°50′46″S 052°29′10″W	
SSJN		Santa Helena Farm Heliport	Bragança Paulista, São Paulo	22°58′14″S 046°40′49″W	
SSJO		Angico Farm Aerodrome	Corumbá, Mato Grosso do Sul	19°22′35″S 057°27′10″W	
SSJP		Junqueira Farm Aerodrome	Colorado, Paraná	22°53′27″S 051°55′30″W	
SSJQ		Floresta Farm Aerodrome	Ribeirão Cascalheira, Mato Grosso	12°48′24″S 051°52′27″W	
SSJR		São Roque Farm Aerodrome	Sorriso, Mato Grosso	13°23′22″S 055°14′51″W	
SSJS		Autos do Sangue Aerodrome	Brasnorte, Mato Grosso	11°32′35″S 058°13′28″W	
SSJT		JTMaresias Heliport	São Sebastião, São Paulo	23°47′12″S 045°35′13″W	
SSJU		São Caetano Farm Aerodrome	Primavera do Leste, Mato Grosso	15°16′50″S 054°25′36″W	
SSJV		Piratininga Farm Aerodrome	Corumbá, Mato Grosso do Sul	17°56′33″S 056°28′48″W	
SSJW		Jauru Farm Aerodrome	Nova Andradina, Mato Grosso do Sul	21°46′57″S 053°33′32″W	
SSJX		São Bento Aerodrome	Corumbá, Mato Grosso do Sul	19°28′43″S 057°00′52″W	
SSJY		São João Farm Aerodrome	Corumbá, Mato Grosso do Sul	17°42′27″S 056°13′02″W	
SSJZ		Três Unidos Farm Aerodrome	Terra Roxa, Paraná	24°03′06″S 054°00′24″W	
SSKA		Campinas Farm Aerodrome	Corumbá, Mato Grosso do Sul	18°54′29″S 056°21′22″W	
SSKB		Tupanciretã Farm Aerodrome	Aquidauana, Mato Grosso do Sul	19°29′25″S 056°23′10″W	
SSKC		Cristiani Farm Aerodrome	Barra do Bugres, Mato Grosso	14°59′11″S 057°18′12″W	
SSKD		Cristal 2 Farm Aerodrome	Nova Crixás, Goiás	14°20′29″S 050°27′10″W	
SSKE		Luís Antônio Fontenele–Cocal da Estação Aerodrome	Cocal, Piauí	03°27′19″S 041°36′17″W	
SSKF		Porto Bonito Aerodrome	Itaquiraí, Mato Grosso do Sul	23°20′38″S 053°52′21″W	
SSKG		Santa Maria Estate Airport	Campo Grande, Mato Grosso do Sul	20°30′20″S 054°31′29″W	
SSKH		Karl Hermann Isenberg Farm Aerodrome	Aral Moreira, Mato Grosso do Sul	22°54′42″S 055°32′20″W	
SSKI		Cristo Rei Farm Aerodrome	Parecis, Rondônia	12°05′15″S 061°16′37″W	
SSKJ		Pau dos Ferros Aerodrome	Pau dos Ferros, Rio Grande do Norte	06°09′16″S 038°11′49″W	
SSKK		Capão da Canoa Airport	Capão da Canoa, Rio Grande do Sul	29°45′49″S 050°02′13″W	
SSKL		JK 1455 Heliport	São Paulo, São Paulo	23°35′27″S 046°40′57″W	
SSKM	CBW	Campo Mourão Airport	Campo Mourão, Paraná	24°00′09″S 052°21′25″W	
SSKN		Takeo Noguchi Aerodrome	Araraquara, São Paulo	21°43′58″S 048°13′18″W	
SSKO		Matrinchã Farm Aerodrome	Brasnorte, Mato Grosso	12°55′49″S 057°20′25″W	
SSKP		CEAL Palotina Aerodrome	Palotina, Paraná	24°18′32″S 053°50′32″W	Closed
SSKQ		Santa Rosa Farm Aerodrome	Nova Crixás, Goiás	14°32′28″S 050°27′43″W	
SSKR		Primavera Farm Aerodrome	Paraúna, Goiás	17°09′49″S 050°48′59″W	
SSKS		Brigadeiro Nero Moura Airport	Cachoeira do Sul, Rio Grande do Sul	30°00′08″S 052°56′25″W	
SSKT		Santa Catarina Aeroclub Aerodrome	São José, Santa Catarina	27°36′43″S 048°40′24″W	
SSKU		Lauro Antônio da Costa Airport	Curitibanos, Santa Catarina	27°17′14″S 050°36′14″W	
SSKV		Unimed Volta Redonda Heliport	Volta Redonda, Rio de Janeiro	22°32′02″S 044°04′37″W	
SSKW	OAL	Cacoal Airport	Cacoal, Rondônia	11°29′44″S 061°27′03″W	
SSKX		Saco Aerodrome	Estância, Sergipe	11°25′19″S 037°19′25″W	
SSKY		Querência Farm Aerodrome	Tangará da Serra, Mato Grosso	14°28′10″S 058°21′32″W	
SSKZ		Carazinho Airport	Carazinho, Rio Grande do Sul	28°19′18″S 052°49′00″W	
SSLA		Alves Farm Aerodrome	Sorriso, Mato Grosso	12°37′04″S 055°37′00″W	
SSLB		São Paulino Farm Aerodrome	Corumbá, Mato Grosso do Sul	19°01′32″S 055°55′30″W	
SSLC		Cooperativa Lar Heliport	Medianeira, Paraná	25°16′27″S 054°04′03″W	
SSLD		Lourdes Farm Aerodrome	Corumbá, Mato Grosso do Sul	18°38′36″S 056°45′32″W	
SSLE		Eldorado Brasil Heliport	Três Lagoas, Mato Grosso do Sul	20°35′43″S 051°36′50″W	
SSLF		Melo Pinheiro Heliport	Porto Feliz, São Paulo	23°14′23″S 047°27′38″W	
SSLG		São Luís Gonzaga Airport	São Luiz Gonzaga, Rio Grande do Sul	28°22′35″S 055°02′15″W	
SSLH		Helipalm Heliport	Suzano, São Paulo	23°39′07″S 046°18′53″W	
SSLI		Nova Piuva Farm Aerodrome	Aquidauana, Mato Grosso do Sul	19°51′52″S 055°30′47″W	
SSLJ		São Luís Farm Aerodrome	Pimenteiras do Oeste, Rondônia	13°27′07″S 060°49′42″W	
SSLK		Três Lagoas Farm Aerodrome	Itapecerica, Minas Gerais	20°24′22″S 044°59′51″W	
SSLL		Vale Verde Farm Aerodrome	Porto Velho, Rondônia	09°37′17″S 065°46′13″W	
SSLM		Acrobata Estate Aerodrome	Leopoldo de Bulhões, Goiás	16°32′56″S 048°56′30″W	
SSLN		Helmuth Baungartem Airport	Lontras, Santa Catarina	27°09′35″S 049°32′34″W	
SSLO		Attilio Accorsi Airport	Loanda, Paraná	22°55′02″S 053°08′57″W	
SSLP		Lucero Porã Farm Aerodrome	Porto Murtinho, Rio Grande do Sul	21°54′39″S 057°38′48″W	
SSLQ		Taiamã Farm Aerodrome	Corumbá, Mato Grosso do Sul	18°05′33″S 055°36′20″W	
SSLR		Ocorema Aerodrome	Ladário, Mato Grosso do Sul	19°06′18″S 057°35′36″W	
SSLS		Ruy Barbosa Aerodrome	Ruy Barbosa, Bahia	12°16′17″S 040°31′50″W	
SSLT	ALQ	Alegrete Airport	Alegrete, Rio Grande do Sul	29°48′45″S 055°53′36″W	
SSLU		Palazzo Lumini Heliport	Curitiba, Paraná	25°26′23″S 049°20′32″W	
SSLV		Jerusalem Medical Centre Heliport	Recife, Pernambuco	08°03′53″S 034°53′32″W	
SSLW		Reunidas Schlatter Farms Aerodrome	Chapadão do Sul, Mato Grosso do Sul	18°48′34″S 052°35′46″W	
SSLX		Santa Lydia Farm Aerodrome	Diamante do Norte, Paraná	22°37′59″S 052°48′30″W	
SSLY		Norte Sul Heliport	Campinas, São Paulo	22°54′07″S 047°02′49″W	
SSLZ		Golfe Lago Azul Heliport	Araçoiaba da Serra, São Paulo	23°30′23″S 047°35′06″W	
SSMA		Spasse Heliport	Ribeirão Preto, São Paulo	21°12′04″S 047°47′45″W	
SSMB		Oriente Farm Aerodrome	Valença, Rio de Janeiro	22°17′11″S 043°37′30″W	
SSMC		São Miguel da Catequese Farm Aerodrome	Nova Andradina, Mato Grosso do Sul	22°05′16″S 053°31′12″W	
SSMD		Maremanga Heliport	Salvador, Bahia	12°45′48″S 038°38′38″W	
SSME		Ipiranga Farm Aerodrome	Anastácio, Mato Grosso do Sul	20°58′34″S 055°33′56″W	
SSMF		Flamingo Fishing Spot Aerodrome	Barão de Melgaço, Mato Grosso	17°09′31″S 056°36′53″W	
SSMG		Uno Heliport	Santos, São Paulo	23°57′25″S 046°19′52″W	
SSMH		Marechal Thaumaturgo Aerodrome	Marechal Thaumaturgo, Acre	08°57′34″S 072°46′47″W	
SSMI		São Miguel Farm Aerodrome	Campo Verde, Mato Grosso	15°21′33″S 054°58′48″W	
SSMJ		Maracaju Airport	Maracaju, Mato Grosso do Sul	21°38′02″S 055°08′42″W	
SSMK		El Dorado Aerodrome	Eldorado do Sul, Rio Grande do Sul	30°04′21″S 051°24′40″W	
SSML		Comandante Jorge Mello Aerodrome	Bom Jesus da Lapa, Bahia	13°11′48″S 043°38′08″W	
SSMM		Macaé Heliport	Tauá, Ceará	06°06′15″S 040°17′04″W	
SSMN		Metropolitan Heliport	Goiânia, Goiás	16°42′18″S 049°14′27″W	
SSMO		Luma Farm Aerodrome	Paraíso das Águas, Mato Grosso do Sul	19°20′42″S 052°43′49″W	
SSMP		Três Minas Farm Aerodrome	Itambé, Paraná	23°40′22″S 052°00′36″W	
SSMQ		Chácara Monte Alegre Heliport	Monte Alegre do Sul, São Paulo	22°41′26″S 046°40′49″W	
SSMR		Manoel Ribas Airport	Manoel Ribas, Paraná	24°31′46″S 051°39′06″W	
SSMS		BH Supermarkets Heliport	Contagem, Minas Gerais	19°51′56″S 044°01′51″W	
SSMT		Mostardas Airport	Mostardas, Rio Grande do Sul	31°06′04″S 050°54′29″W	
SSMU		Magnum Heliport	Cachoeirinha, Rio Grande do Sul	29°56′53″S 051°06′19″W	
SSMV		Boa Vista Farm Aerodrome	Pirassununga, São Paulo	22°02′41″S 047°33′36″W	
SSMW		Ilha Aerosporting Club Aerodrome	Peruíbe, São Paulo	24°18′55″S 047°00′50″W	
SSMX		Planalto Farm Aerodrome	Nova Resende, Minas Gerais	21°08′34″S 046°29′02″W	
SSMY		São Miguel do Iguaçu Aerodrome	São Miguel do Iguaçu, Paraná	25°23′34″S 054°16′06″W	
SSMZ		São Mateus Farm Aerodrome	Comodoro, Mato Grosso	13°55′02″S 059°59′00″W	
SSNA		Miranda Estate Aerodrome	Miranda, Mato Grosso do Sul	19°54′03″S 056°26′22″W	
SSNB		Ariosto da Riva Airport	Naviraí, Mato Grosso do Sul	23°02′03″S 054°10′40″W	
SSNC		Minas de Conceição Heliport	Itabira, Minas Gerais	19°39′02″S 043°15′11″W	
SSND		Santa Maria Aerodrome	São Félix do Araguaia, Mato Grosso	11°09′53″S 052°49′27″W	
SSNE		Santa Maria Aerodrome	Barão de Melgaço, Mato Grosso	17°07′48″S 056°23′35″W	
SSNF		Naisa Farm Aerodrome	Colômbia, São Paulo	20°19′47″S 048°48′36″W	
SSNG		Hélio Alves de Oliveira Airport	Montenegro, Rio Grande do Sul	29°43′11″S 051°29′20″W	
SSNH		Novo Hamburgo Airport	Novo Hamburgo, Rio Grande do Sul	29°41′57″S 051°04′55″W	
SSNI		Novo Rumo Farm Aerodrome	Naviraí, Mato Grosso do Sul	22°59′12″S 053°52′40″W	
SSNJ		Primavera Farm Aerodrome	Aquidauana, Mato Grosso do Sul	19°30′31″S 055°54′20″W	
SSNK		Campanário Farm Aerodrome	Bodoquena, Mato Grosso do Sul	20°24′40″S 056°31′50″W	
SSNL		Louzandes Heliport	Silvânia, Goiás	16°35′08″S 048°43′15″W	
SSNM		Santa Mônica Heliport	Colombo, Paraná	25°22′55″S 049°08′17″W	
SSNN		Nova Fartura Farm Aerodrome	Planalto da Serra, Mato Grosso	14°26′27″S 054°46′02″W	
SSNO		Estrela Dalva Farm Aerodrome	Aporé, Goiás	18°42′42″S 052°02′25″W	
SSNP		Ilmo Aloísio Blume Airport	Nova Prata, Rio Grande do Sul	28°48′14″S 051°36′08″W	
SSNQ		Nioaque Airport	Nioaque, Mato Grosso do Sul	21°11′04″S 055°49′52″W	
SSNR		Novo Horizonte Farm Aerodrome	Coxim, Mato Grosso do Sul	18°19′02″S 054°56′10″W	
SSNS		Pajuçara Farm Aerodrome	Correntina, Bahia	13°10′59″S 045°06′17″W	
SSNT		Jacarezinho Nova Terra Farm Aerodrome	Wanderley, Bahia	11°45′24″S 044°08′00″W	
SSNU		Santa Izabel Farm Aerodrome	Brotas, São Paulo	22°14′27″S 048°01′30″W	Closed
SSNV		Novo Horizonte Farm Aerodrome	Corumbá, Mato Grosso do Sul	19°13′59″S 057°01′47″W	
SSNW		FBDM Heliport	Barrocas, Bahia	11°27′06″S 039°04′52″W	
SSNX		Paic Participações Heliport	Itirapina, São Paulo	22°12′46″S 047°44′15″W	
SSNY		Florida Farm Aerodrome	Cáceres, Mato Grosso	17°11′01″S 058°13′00″W	
SSNZ		Paradiso Agropecuária Aerodrome	Campos Novos Paulista, São Paulo	22°37′04″S 050°05′25″W	
SSOA		Blue Tree Tower Faria Lima Heliport	São Paulo, São Paulo	23°35′28″S 046°40′51″W	
SSOB		Flamboyant Heliport	Indaiatuba, São Paulo	23°02′56″S 047°10′04″W	
SSOC		Ivaí Aeroagrícola Aerodrome	Engenheiro Beltrão, Paraná	23°42′36″S 052°09′52″W	
SSOD		Pouso Alegre Farm Aerodrome	Miranda, Mato Grosso do Sul	20°15′03″S 056°24′34″W	
SSOE	SQX	São Miguel do Oeste Airport	São Miguel do Oeste, Santa Catarina	26°46′52″S 053°30′12″W	
SSOF		Ouro Verde Heliport	Curitiba, Paraná	25°30′29″S 049°19′56″W	
SSOG	APX	Arapongas Airport	Arapongas, Paraná	23°21′10″S 051°29′30″W	
SSOH		Home Heliport	Brasília, Federal District	15°50′07″S 047°54′36″W	
SSOI		Pederneiras Airport	Pederneiras, São Paulo	22°18′26″S 048°46′23″W	
SSOJ		Estrela Farm Aerodrome	Inocência, Mato Grosso do Sul	19°58′50″S 051°44′17″W	
SSOK		14 Bis Aerodrome	Londrina, Paraná	23°12′53″S 051°11′04″W	
SSOL		Padre Israel Batista de Carvalho Airport	Lavras, Minas Gerais	21°14′26″S 044°57′51″W	
SSOM		Embaixador Aerodrome	Bela Vista de Goiás, Goiás	16°49′23″S 049°02′38″W	
SSON		Joalice Farm Aerodrome	Tacuru, Mato Grosso do Sul	23°47′14″S 055°01′29″W	
SSOO		Pontal da Cachoeira Farm Aerodrome	Camapuã, Mato Grosso do Sul	19°25′50″S 054°17′42″W	
SSOP		Porquinho Aerodrome	Itaituba, Paraná	05°10′44″S 057°37′16″W	
SSOQ		Barranco Alto Farm Aerodrome	Aquidauana, Mato Grosso do Sul	19°34′30″S 056°09′18″W	
SSOR		Ages Jacobina Heliport	Jacobina, Bahia	11°09′24″S 040°34′29″W	
SSOS		Osório Airport	Osório, Rio Grande do Sul	29°54′08″S 050°14′57″W	
SSOT		Saco da Tapera Farm Aerodrome	São Romão, Minas Gerais	16°21′00″S 045°20′32″W	
SSOU	AIR	Aripuanã Airport	Aripuanã, Mato Grosso	10°11′08″S 059°27′28″W	
SSOV		Icon Alphaville Heliport	Barueri, São Paulo	23°29′34″S 046°50′53″W	
SSOW		Frederico Westphalen Aeroclub Aerodrome	Frederico Westphalen, Rio Grande do Sul	27°20′51″S 053°24′12″W	
SSOX		Olho d'Agua Farm Aerodrome	Pedro Gomes, Mato Grosso do Sul	18°16′09″S 054°35′35″W	
SSOY		Morada do Sol Farm Aerodrome	Nova Maringá, Mato Grosso	12°17′26″S 057°01′09″W	
SSOZ		Onça Parda Farm Aerodrome	Antônio João, Mato Grosso do Sul	22°15′56″S 055°46′40″W	
SSPA		Marajoara Farm Aerodrome	Cariri do Tocantins, Tocantins	11°57′48″S 049°02′17″W	
SSPB		São José do Pontal Farm Aerodrome	Ribas do Rio Pardo, Mato Grosso do Sul	20°39′07″S 053°35′56″W	
SSPC		Santa Júlia Farm Aerodrome	Cocalinho, Mato Grosso	13°43′54″S 051°20′24″W	
SSPD		Paraguá Farm Aerodrome	Vila Bela da Santíssima Trindade, Mato Grosso	14°46′00″S 060°02′00″W	
SSPE		Essência Retiro do Rio Cuiabá Aerodrome	Nobres, Mato Grosso	14°26′08″S 055°36′34″W	
SSPF		Fly Village Aerodrome	Altos, Piauí	05°04′14″S 042°30′38″W	
SSPG	PNG	Paranaguá Airport	Paranaguá, Paraná	25°32′25″S 048°31′52″W	
SSPH		Santa Lucia Farm Aerodrome	Lucas do Rio Verde, Mato Grosso	12°55′37″S 056°05′50″W	
SSPI	PVI	Edu Chaves Airport	Paranavaí, Paraná	23°05′24″S 052°29′19″W	
SSPJ		Pousada Juruena Aerodrome	Nova Bandeirantes, Mato Grosso	09°22′09″S 058°32′39″W	
SSPK		Porecatu Airport	Porecatu, Paraná	22°46′44″S 051°21′41″W	
SSPL		Palmeira das Missões Airport	Palmeira das Missões, Rio Grande do Sul	27°54′06″S 053°19′48″W	
SSPM		Porto Murtinho Airport	Porto Murtinho, Mato Grosso do Sul	21°42′46″S 057°52′45″W	
SSPN		Paranaíba Airport	Paranaíba, Mato Grosso do Sul	19°39′04″S 051°11′58″W	
SSPO		APLIC Aviação Agrícola II Aerodrome	Itaporã, Mato Grosso do Sul	22°00′33″S 054°47′23″W	
SSPP		Estreito e Ponte de Pedra Farm Aerodrome	Montividiu, Goiás	17°16′00″S 051°13′06″W	
SSPQ		São Paulo Military Police Hospital Heliport	São Paulo, São Paulo	23°28′13″S 046°37′10″W	
SSPR		Palácio Iguaçu Heliport	Curitiba, Paraná	25°24′46″S 049°16′06″W	
SSPS		Dimorvan Carraro Airport	Palmas, Paraná	26°28′20″S 051°58′32″W	
SSPT		Brasílio Marques Airport	Palotina, Paraná	24°20′36″S 053°49′43″W	
SSPU		São João do Ibiporã Farm Aerodrome	Pontes e Lacerda, Mato Grosso	15°47′08″S 059°38′12″W	
SSPV		Vera Farm Aerodrome	Alcinópolis, Mato Grosso do Sul	17°56′58″S 053°53′45″W	
SSPW		São Paulo Farm Aerodrome	Costa Rica, Mato Grosso do Sul	18°06′19″S 053°09′09″W	
SSPX		Paraná Moda Park Heliport	Maringá, Paraná	23°27′45″S 051°59′36″W	
SSPY		Porto Índio Air Base	Corumbá, Mato Grosso do Sul	17°40′11″S 057°45′11″W	
SSPZ		Redenção Farm Aerodrome	Piracicaba, São Paulo	22°43′00″S 048°02′56″W	
SSQA		Guaporé Farm Aerodrome	Comodoro, Mato Grosso	13°43′23″S 060°18′55″W	
SSQB		Barrinha Farm Heliport	Espírito Santo do Pinhal, São Paulo	22°07′24″S 046°47′54″W	
SSQC		Siqueira Campos Airport	Siqueira Campos, Paraná	23°40′29″S 049°48′56″W	
SSQD		Panamby Farm Aerodrome	Querência, Mato Grosso	13°02′49″S 052°10′39″W	
SSQE		TV Mundial I Heliport	São Paulo, São Paulo	23°34′05″S 046°42′30″W	
SSQF		Floresta Negra Farm Aerodrome	Sete Quedas, Mato Grosso do Sul	23°48′51″S 054°41′56″W	
SSQG		Bom Gosto Farm Aerodrome	Rondon do Pará, Pará	04°52′19″S 048°57′27″W	
SSQH		Mater Dei Hospital Heliport	Belo Horizonte, Minas Gerais	19°55′40″S 043°56′59″W	
SSQI		Santa Anastácia I Aerodrome	Sorriso, Mato Grosso	12°30′33″S 055°40′56″W	
SSQJ		Buriti 10 Farm Aerodrome	Paracatu, Minas Gerais	16°54′08″S 046°37′03″W	
SSQK		Gávea Farm Aerodrome	Cerqueira César, São Paulo	23°13′30″S 049°10′45″W	
SSQL		La Poveda Farm Aerodrome	Felixlândia, Minas Gerais	18°51′08″S 044°55′05″W	
SSQM		Malibu do Parecis Aerodrome	Brasnorte, Mato Grosso	13°08′24″S 057°35′59″W	
SSQN		BS Design Heliport	Fortaleza, Ceará	03°44′15″S 038°29′58″W	
SSQO		Sequóia Farm Aerodrome	Angelândia, Minas Gerais	17°39′10″S 042°15′55″W	
SSQP		Monte Santo Airport	Monte Santo, Bahia	10°27′55″S 039°17′10″W	
SSQQ		CLC Condominium Aerodrome	Campo Grande, Mato Grosso do Sul	20°20′25″S 054°35′25″W	
SSQR		Primavera Farm Aerodrome	Ribas do Rio Pardo, Mato Grosso do Sul	21°23′10″S 053°35′53″W	
SSQS		Brasil Farm Aerodrome	Barra do Garças, Mato Grosso	15°01′57″S 052°18′36″W	
SSQT		Castro Airport	Castro, Paraná	24°48′27″S 049°57′37″W	
SSQU		Alegrete–Retiro Carandá Farm Aerodrome	Aquidauana, Mato Grosso do Sul	20°03′53″S 055°42′06″W	
SSQV		São Paulo City University Heliport	São Paulo, São Paulo	23°32′10″S 046°33′34″W	
SSQW		Royal Palm Plaza Heliport	Campinas, São Paulo	22°56′10″S 047°04′20″W	
SSQX		Frei Caneca Shopping Heliport	São Paulo	23°33′14″S 046°39′10″W	
SSQY		São Paulo Corporate Centre Heliport	São Paulo, São Paulo	23°39′04″S 046°43′40″W	
SSQZ		Mimoso do Oeste Aerodrome	Luís Eduardo Magalhães, Bahia	12°06′23″S 045°53′42″W	
SSRA		Santa Rosa do Purus Aerodrome	Santa Rosa do Purus, Acre	09°26′47″S 070°28′58″W	
SSRC		Santa Inês Farm Aerodrome	Rio Brilhante, Mato Grosso do Sul	21°42′11″S 054°22′06″W	
SSRD		Dalmo Restaurant Heliport	Guarujá, São Paulo	23°54′15″S 046°11′25″W	
SSRE		Realeza Airport	Realeza, Paraná	25°48′04″S 053°30′47″W	
SSRF		Castro Alves Airport	Castro Alves, Bahia	12°46′04″S 039°26′41″W	
SSRG		Registro Airport	Registro, São Paulo	24°31′54″S 047°50′25″W	
SSRH		Haras Sahara Heliport	Matozinhos, Minas Gerais	19°32′04″S 044°01′14″W	
SSRI		Ilhota dos Coqueiros Heliport	Salvador, Bahia	12°46′00″S 038°39′00″W	
SSRJ		Jacuí Farm Aerodrome	Eldorado do Sul, Rio Grande do Sul	29°58′58″S 051°18′02″W	
SSRK		Campo Alegre de Lourdes Aerodrome	Campo Alegre de Lourdes, Bahia	09°30′49″S 042°59′45″W	
SSRL		Rancho Alegre Farm Aerodrome	Rio Verde de Mato Grosso, Mato Grosso do Sul	18°47′40″S 055°14′47″W	
SSRM		Santos Reis Farm Aerodrome	Rio Maria, Pará	07°24′24″S 050°04′10″W	
SSRN		Serra do Curral Heliport	Belo Horizonte, Minas Gerais	19°57′09″S 043°55′06″W	
SSRO		Arrojadinho Farm Aerodrome	Jaborandi, Bahia	13°55′24″S 045°32′51″W	
SSRP		Agromaster Farm Aerodrome	Marcelândia, Mato Grosso	10°51′51″S 054°42′37″W	
SSRQ		Reik Heliport	Guarujá, São Paulo	23°57′38″S 046°10′57″W	
SSRR		Meu Ranchinho Farm Aerodrome	Pedro Gomes, Mato Grosso do Sul	18°13′06″S 054°34′48″W	
SSRS	BRB	Barreirinhas Airport	Barreirinhas, Maranhão	02°45′24″S 042°48′12″W	Formerly SBRR
SSRT		Sítio Rosa Mística Heliport	Matão, São Paulo	21°32′13″S 048°30′16″W	
SSRU		São Lourenço do Sul Airport	São Lourenço do Sul, Rio Grande do Sul	31°23′05″S 052°01′57″W	
SSRV		Riviera Heliport	Itajaí, Santa Catarina	26°57′10″S 048°38′22″W	
SSRW		J. Campos Farm Aerodrome	Porangaba, São Paulo	23°12′11″S 048°06′17″W	
SSRX		Recanto da Serra Heliport	Itaguaí, Rio de Janeiro	22°48′50″S 043°48′40″W	
SSRY		Ypê Heliport	Amparo, São Paulo	22°43′14″S 046°47′31″W	
SSRZ		Dário Brasil Capoano de Oliveira Airport	Rosário do Sul, Rio Grande do Sul	30°16′39″S 054°55′31″W	
SSSA		Sant'Anna do Apa Farm Aerodrome	Bela Vista, Mato Grosso do Sul	21°59′43″S 056°14′23″W	
SSSB	JBS	São Borja Airport	São Borja, Rio Grande do Sul	28°39′17″S 056°02′05″W	
SSSC	CSU	Luiz Beck da Silva Airport	Santa Cruz do Sul, Rio Grande do Sul	29°41′03″S 052°24′44″W	
SSSD		Soledade Airport	Soledade, Rio Grande do Sul	28°51′48″S 052°32′26″W	
SSSE		Jihad Dehaini Heliport	Araucária, Paraná	25°34′36″S 049°23′40″W	
SSSF		Frances Farm Aerodrome	Acreúna, Goiás	17°18′48″S 050°25′29″W	
SSSG		São Gabriel Airport	São Gabriel, Rio Grande do Sul	30°20′42″S 054°16′04″W	
SSSH		Santo Inácio Farm Aerodrome	Corumbá, Mato Grosso do Sul	19°11′57″S 057°00′40″W	
SSSI		Manto Verde Farm Aerodrome	Baixa Grande do Ribeiro, Piauí	07°52′05″S 045°00′53″W	
SSSJ		HSM Heliport	Belém, Pará	01°26′16″S 048°28′07″W	
SSSK		FC Codó Aerodrome	Codó, Maranhão	04°30′21″S 043°55′25″W	
SSSL		Santa Luzia Farm Aerodrome	Alto Paraíso, Paraná	23°29′06″S 053°47′10″W	
SSSM		Matheus Lopes Maia da Silva Aerodrome	Itamarati, Amazonas	06°24′56″S 068°15′27″W	
SSSN		O Açu Heliport	São João da Barra, Rio de Janeiro	21°47′57″S 041°01′08″W	
SSSO		Porto Seco Heliport	Amélia Rodrigues, Bahia	12°20′11″S 038°50′36″W	
SSSP		Sítio Primavera Aerodrome	Bom Jesus do Sul, Paraná	26°10′55″S 053°38′24″W	
SSSQ		Mata Roxa Farm Aerodrome	Nova Aurora, Goiás	18°12′17″S 048°16′50″W	
SSSR		Serrana Farm Aerodrome	São Desidério, Bahia	12°59′57″S 046°00′07″W	
SSSS		São Francisco do Sul Airport	São Francisco do Sul, Santa Catarina	26°13′16″S 048°33′52″W	
SSST		Santiago Airport	Santiago, Rio Grande do Sul	29°12′54″S 054°50′30″W	
SSSU		Sucuri Farm Aerodrome	Rio Verde de Mato Grosso, Mato Grosso do Sul	18°52′33″S 055°03′37″W	
SSSV		Palmitos Farm Aerodrome	Nova Ubiratã, Mato Grosso	13°49′12″S 054°45′12″W	
SSSW		Madeireira Aerodrome	Colniza, Mato Grosso	09°14′11″S 060°20′17″W	
SSSX		Sierra Whiskey Victor Romeo Heliport	Penalva, Maranhão	03°15′57″S 045°10′54″W	Formerly SWVR
SSSY		Silvana Farm Aerodrome	Nova Andradina, Mato Grosso do Sul	22°31′25″S 053°29′58″W	
SSSZ		Sertanópolis Airport	Sertanópolis, Paraná	23°03′43″S 051°00′50″W	
SSTA		Santa Cecília II Farm Aerodrome	Corumbá, Mato Grosso do Sul	18°08′41″S 056°05′58″W	
SSTB		Três Barras Airport	Três Barras, Santa Catarina	26°08′07″S 050°18′38″W	
SSTC		Braskem Unib-RS Heliport	Triunfo, Rio Grande do Sul	29°52′46″S 051°22′46″W	
SSTD		Stracci Aerodrome	São Desidério, Bahia	12°40′51″S 046°15′55″W	
SSTE	TSQ	Torres Airport	Torres, Rio Grande do Sul	29°24′54″S 049°48′36″W	
SSTF		Santa Fé Farm Aerodrome	Santana do Araguaia, Pará	09°34′30″S 050°21′04″W	
SSTG		Primavera Heliport	Goianira, Goiás	16°32′31″S 049°24′28″W	
SSTH		Thalia Farm Aerodrome	Balsa Nova, Paraná	25°31′14″S 049°40′55″W	
SSTI		Santa Matilde Farm Aerodrome	Petrópolis, Rio de Janeiro	22°16′05″S 043°00′09″W	
SSTJ		Walter Ewaldo Siegel Aerodrome	Trombudo Central, Santa Catarina	27°20′55″S 049°49′14″W	
SSTK		Albatroz II Farm Aerodrome	Luís Eduardo Magalhães, Bahia	12°10′07″S 045°49′01″W	Closed
SSTL		São Sebastião Farm Aerodrome	São Desidério, Bahia	13°04′06″S 046°15′33″W	
SSTM		Santo Antônio Farm Aerodrome	Manicoré, Amazonas	07°47′35″S 061°41′02″W	
SSTN		Soufer Cambuí Heliport	Cambuí, Minas Gerais	22°33′40″S 046°02′18″W	
SSTP		Baessa Farm Aerodrome	Turvelândia, Goiás	17°58′28″S 050°19′06″W	
SSTQ		Silvestre Aerodrome	Pedra Branca do Amapari, Amapá	00°51′00″N 051°54′26″W	
SSTR		Usina CEM Aerodrome	Morrinhos, Goiás	17°56′11″S 049°14′29″W	
SSTS		Soteco Aerodrome	Cáceres, Mato Grosso	16°06′35″S 058°26′22″W	
SSTT		Lemon Motel Heliport	Recife, Pernambuco	08°04′29″S 034°54′19″W	
SSTU		Tujuri Farm Aerodrome	Eldorado, Mato Grosso do Sul	23°41′34″S 054°22′43″W	
SSTV		Diamantino Farm Aerodrome	Sinop, Mato Grosso	12°07′11″S 055°24′07″W	
SSTX		Lagoa dos Patos Farm Aerodrome	Riacho dos Machados, Minas Gerais	16°11′38″S 043°04′21″W	
SSTY		Tosana Farm Aerodrome	Cabo Frio, Rio de Janeiro	22°35′49″S 042°01′30″W	
SSTZ		Sertãozinho Farm Aerodrome	Aquidauana, Mato Grosso do Sul	19°17′14″S 056°08′07″W	
SSUA		Sonora Estate Farm Aerodrome	Sonora, Mato Grosso do Sul	17°38′26″S 054°45′22″W	
SSUB		HBR Heliport	Osasco, São Paulo	23°28′43″S 046°46′52″W	
SSUC		Célia Neuza Aerodrome	Santa Bárbara do Pará, Pará	01°10′09″S 048°12′38″W	
SSUD		Serra Dourada Farm Aerodrome	Itaituba, Pará	05°42′59″S 056°26′07″W	
SSUE		Ribeirão Preto Helicentre Heliport	Ribeirão Preto, São Paulo	21°12′37″S 047°46′13″W	
SSUF		Rede d'Or São Luiz Anália Franco Heliport	São Paulo, São Paulo	23°32′56″S 046°33′30″W	
SSUG		Full Gauge Heliport	Canoas, Rio Grande do Sul	29°57′18″S 051°10′26″W	
SSUH		Helinorte Heliport	São Paulo, São Paulo	23°24′54″S 046°34′50″W	
SSUI		Novo Horizonte Farm Aerodrome	Santa Fé do Araguaia, Tocantins	07°05′49″S 048°45′37″W	
SSUJ		Estrada do Iate Clube Heliport	Mairinque, São Paulo	23°36′27″S 047°15′49″W	
SSUK		Menina Farm Aerodrome	Itapura, São Paulo	20°38′24″S 051°28′36″W	
SSUL		Curitiba Ultralight Club Aerodrome	São José dos Pinhais, Paraná	25°28′40″S 049°09′17″W	
SSUM	UMU	Umuarama Airport	Umuarama, Paraná	23°47′57″S 053°18′50″W	
SSUN		Petrobrás Guarulhos Terminal Heliport	Guarulhos, São Paulo	23°28′14″S 046°26′50″W	
SSUO		Unifly Heliport	Arujá, São Paulo	23°24′33″S 046°19′51″W	
SSUP		Santa Joana Hospital Heliport	Recife, Pernambuco	08°03′09″S 034°53′53″W	
SSUQ		Terra Morena Farm Aerodrome	Correntina, Bahia	13°12′13″S 045°15′14″W	
SSUR		Rio Fontoura Farm Aerodrome	São Félix do Araguaia, Mato Grosso	11°33′54″S 052°15′27″W	
SSUS		Uniggel Sementes–Santa Maria Farm Aerodrome	Costa Rica, Mato Grosso do Sul	18°24′47″S 052°53′44″W	
SSUT		Usinas Itamarati Aerodrome	Nova Olímpia, Mato Grosso	14°46′35″S 057°11′18″W	
SSUU		Colombo II Heliport	Palestina, São Paulo	20°12′45″S 049°36′49″W	
SSUV	UVI	União da Vitória Airport	União da Vitória, Paraná	26°13′55″S 051°04′03″W	
SSUW		Palmeiras Farm Aerodrome	Centenário do Sul, Paraná	22°46′31″S 051°30′15″W	
SSUX		Usina Biopalma Moju Heliport	Moju, Pará	02°13′59″S 048°51′37″W	
SSUY		Fundão Farm Aerodrome	Paracatu, Minas Gerais	17°24′55″S 046°39′37″W	
SSUZ		Disco Heliport	Rio de Janeiro, Rio de Janeiro	22°58′50″S 043°13′55″W	
SSVA		Visa Estate Farm Aerodrome	Ladário, Mato Grosso do Sul	19°03′45″S 057°37′45″W	
SSVB		Ventura IV Farm Aerodrome	São Desidério, Bahia	13°08′06″S 046°09′58″W	
SSVC		Vazante Farm Aerodrome	Aquidauana, Mato Grosso do Sul	20°03′48″S 056°09′42″W	
SSVD		Brasília do Sul Farm	Juti, Mato Grosso do Sul	22°42′18″S 054°36′30″W	
SSVE		Cerro Verde Farm Aerodrome	Tacuru, Mato Grosso do Sul	23°48′52″S 055°03′26″W	
SSVF		Vila do Farol Heliport	Bombinhas, Santa Catarina	27°08′57″S 048°29′54″W	
SSVG		Fly Vila Resort Condominium Aerodrome	Guapé, Minas Gerais	20°45′40″S 045°59′10″W	
SSVH		Henri Dunant Heliport	São Paulo, São Paulo	23°37′38″S 046°41′55″W	
SSVI	VIA	Videira Airport	Videira, Santa Catarina	26°59′59″S 051°08′29″W	
SSVJ		São João Farm Aerodrome	Alcinópolis, Mato Grosso do Sul	17°56′10″S 053°54′17″W	
SSVK		Dom Arlindo Farm Aerodrome	Naviraí, Mato Grosso do Sul	22°47′40″S 054°09′25″W	
SSVL	TEC	Telêmaco Borba Airport	Telêmaco Borba, Paraná	24°18′59″S 050°39′08″W	Formerly SBTL
SSVM		Savannah Farm Aerodrome	Cocos, Bahia	14°41′56″S 045°49′47″W	
SSVN		Veranópolis Airport	Veranópolis, Rio Grande do Sul	28°56′08″S 051°34′04″W	
SSVO		Usina de Monções Aerodrome	Monções, São Paulo	20°52′10″S 050°07′47″W	
SSVP		São Joaquim Farm Aerodrome	Conceição da Barra, Espírito Santo	18°15′51″S 039°51′59″W	
SSVQ		Vila do Carvalho Heliport	Ouro Preto, Minas Gerais	20°22′13″S 043°42′23″W	
SSVR		Adão Veríssimo Aerodrome	Itinga do Maranhão, Maranhão	04°22′35″S 047°26′17″W	
SSVS		Sucuri Farm Aerodrome	Rio Brilhante, Mato Grosso do Sul	21°41′32″S 054°46′03″W	
SSVT		Aníbal Aerodrome	Russas, Ceará	04°49′42″S 037°56′34″W	
SSVU		Serra do Cabral Farm Aerodrome	Francisco Dumont, Minas Gerais	17°41′53″S 044°20′53″W	
SSVV		Garimpinho Farm Aerodrome	Figueirão, Mato Grosso do Sul	18°43′09″S 054°18′03″W	
SSVW		Galera Farm Aerodrome	Conquista d'Oeste, Mato Grosso	14°30′47″S 059°33′25″W	
SSVX		Valeu Boi Leilões Aerodrome	Rio Maria, Pará	07°18′06″S 050°01′52″W	
SSVY		Três Barras Farm Aerodrome	Pitangueiras, São Paulo	20°56′16″S 048°10′24″W	
SSVZ		Autovias Heliport	Ribeirão Preto, São Paulo	21°09′48″S 047°45′18″W	
SSWB		Cooperativa Agropecuária da Região do Distrito Federal Aerodrome	Brasília, Federal District	16°00′52″S 047°33′29″W	
SSWC		CEMIG Heliport	Belo Horizonte, Minas Gerais	19°55′44″S 043°57′02″W	
SSWD		Plaza II Heliport	São Paulo, São Paulo	23°36′40″S 046°41′46″W	
SSWE		Fortaleza Farm Aerodrome	Boa Vista do Incra, Rio Grande do Sul	28°55′57″S 053°25′31″W	
SSWF		Cachoeirinha Farm Aerodrome	Ribas do Rio Pardo, Mato Grosso do Sul	20°18′50″S 053°46′05″W	
SSWG		Galiléia Farm Aerodrome	Baixa Grande do Ribeiro, Piauí	09°02′57″S 045°19′51″W	
SSWH		Dr. Emílio Fehr Aerodrome	São Carlos, São Paulo	21°54′24″S 047°49′16″W	
SSWI		Vovô Ernesto Farm Aerodrome	Nova Mutum, Mato Grosso	13°18′41″S 055°54′05″W	
SSWJ		Studart Heliport	Fortim, Ceará	04°27′26″S 037°47′41″W	
SSWK		Cuelhambi Farm Aerodrome	Angélica, Mato Grosso do Sul	21°59′53″S 054°04′08″W	
SSWL		Luiz Aragão Aerodrome	Tianguá, Ceará	03°44′24″S 041°01′24″W	
SSWM		Platô Azul Farm Aerodrome	Tiros, Minas Gerais	18°50′52″S 045°51′54″W	
SSWN		Cayman Farm Aerodrome	São Félix do Araguaia, Mato Grosso	11°32′26″S 051°43′28″W	
SSWO		Santa Paula Farm Aerodrome	Comodoro, Mato Grosso	14°01′01″S 060°03′24″W	
SSWP		Palmares Aerodrome	Delfinópolis, Minas Gerais	20°16′56″S 046°56′43″W	
SSWQ		Guanandi Farm Aerodrome	Corumbá, Mato Grosso do Sul	18°52′16″S 056°13′00″W	
SSWR		Campana Farm Aerodrome	Rio Brilhante, Mato Grosso do Sul	21°53′44″S 054°17′38″W	
SSWS		Caçapava do Sul Airport	Caçapava do Sul, Rio Grande do Sul	30°32′58″S 053°27′33″W	
SSWT		Vaticano Farm Aerodrome	Nioaque, Mato Grosso do Sul	21°17′02″S 056°07′14″W	
SSWU		Quick Heliport	Goiânia, Goiás	16°37′11″S 049°15′33″W	
SSWV		Vista Alegre Farm Aerodrome	São Félix do Xingu, Pará	09°38′47″S 051°54′48″W	
SSWW		VR Aviation Heliport	Salvador, Bahia	12°58′54″S 038°28′08″W	
SSWX		Rio Xingú Farm Aerodrome	Santa Cruz do Xingu, Mato Grosso	10°08′08″S 052°33′29″W	
SSWY		Two Towers Heliport	São Luís, Maranhão	02°29′22″S 044°17′44″W	
SSWZ		Dona Neném Farm Aerodrome	Presidente Olegário, Minas Gerais	18°30′34″S 046°16′26″W	
SSXA		Asas do Mato Grosso do Sul Aerodrome	Fátima do Sul, Mato Grosso do Sul	22°20′19″S 054°33′30″W	
SSXB		Água Boa Maricultura Farm Aerodrome	Itaporanga d'Ajuda, Sergipe	11°07′07″S 037°12′32″W	
SSXC		Laguna Porã Farm Aerodrome	Porto Murtinho, Mato Grosso do Sul	21°50′54″S 057°37′18″W	
SSXD		Tobais Bacci Aerodrome	Sarandi, Rio Grande do Sul	27°58′50″S 052°51′52″W	
SSXE		Monumental Business Heliport	São Caetano do Sul, São Paulo	23°36′53″S 046°34′09″W	
SSXF		Fátima do Sul Aerodrome	Fátima do Sul, Mato Grosso do Sul	22°21′41″S 054°33′05″W	
SSXG		Guanabara Farm Aerodrome	Paranapoema, Paraná	22°39′42″S 052°08′33″W	
SSXH		Manoel da Silva Rocha Aerodrome	Brumado, Bahia	14°15′19″S 041°49′03″W	
SSXI		Komprão Itapema Heliport	Itapema, Santa Catarina	27°07′46″S 048°36′47″W	
SSXJ		Unidade de Tratamento de Gás de Cacimbas Heliport	Linhares, Espírito Santo	19°27′57″S 039°45′30″W	
SSXK		Kartódromo Ayrton Senna Heliport	São Paulo, São Paulo	23°42′11″S 046°41′33″W	
SSXL		Chendel Heliport	Atibaia, São Paulo	23°09′55″S 046°34′30″W	
SSXM		Guaciara Farm Aerodrome	Jateí, Mato Grosso do Sul	22°47′09″S 053°52′48″W	
SSXN		Aéreo Amazônia Aerodrome	Altamira, Pará	08°17′54″S 055°06′53″W	
SSXO		Pousada das Águias Aerodrome	Presidente Castelo Branco, Paraná	23°17′26″S 052°07′45″W	
SSXP		Sete Barras Farm Aerodrome	Ribeirão Cascalheira, Mato Grosso do Sul	12°33′42″S 051°41′41″W	
SSXQ		Jota III Farm Aerodrome	Inocência, Mato Grosso do Sul	19°19′52″S 051°58′18″W	
SSXR		Nobel Pará Farm Aerodrome	Santana do Araguaia, Pará	08°58′40″S 050°22′07″W	
SSXS		Sidel Aerodrome	Araci, Bahia	11°09′18″S 039°04′07″W	
SSXT		Cristal Aerodrome	Borá, São Paulo	22°10′56″S 050°29′35″W	
SSXU		Aurora Farm Aerodrome	Jardim, Mato Grosso do Sul	21°31′24″S 056°36′42″W	
SSXV		Santa Rita Farm Aerodrome	Naviraí, Mato Grosso do Sul	22°56′38″S 054°06′22″W	
SSXW		São Paulo Farm Aerodrome	Ivinhema, Mato Grosso do Sul	22°17′44″S 053°50′56″W	
SSXX		João Winckler Municipal Airport	Xanxerê, Santa Catarina	26°52′30″S 052°22′22″W	
SSXY		Rainha da Serra Farm Aerodrome	Uruçuí, Piauí	07°56′34″S 044°23′01″W	
SSXZ		Santa Terezinha Farm Aerodrome	Nova Roma, Goiás	14°02′03″S 046°58′57″W	
SSYA	AAG	Avelino Vieira Airport	Arapoti, Paraná	24°06′15″S 049°47′26″W	
SSYB		Bela Manhã Farm Aerodrome	Santa Clara d'Oeste, São Paulo	20°01′04″S 050°53′33″W	
SSYC		Santa Gertrudes Heliport	Itapetininga, São Paulo	23°39′15″S 048°09′49″W	
SSYD		Nova Ponte Aerodrome	Nova Ponte, Minas Gerais	19°11′56″S 047°43′40″W	
SSYE		Gabriela Farm Aerodrome	Araputanga, Mato Grosso	15°19′01″S 058°30′32″W	
SSYF		Fazenda do Café Aerodrome	Monte Alegre de Minas, Minas Gerais	18°52′22″S 048°43′18″W	
SSYG		Veja Heliport	Paço do Lumiar, Maranhão	02°31′32″S 044°07′32″W	
SSYH		José Carlos Pace Racetrack Hospital Heliport	São Paulo, São Paulo	23°42′00″S 046°41′43″W	
SSYI		Sesmarias Farm Aerodrome	Itaeté, Bahia	13°03′22″S 040°50′03″W	
SSYJ		Boisa Heliport	Maranguape, Ceará	03°58′05″S 038°53′23″W	
SSYK		Mandaçaia Farm Aerodrome	Buri, São Paulo)	23°37′26″S 048°29′34″W	
SSYL		Patrol Farm Aerodrome	Parnarama, Maranhão	05°32′49″S 043°31′13″W	
SSYM		Yachthouse 02 Heliport	Balneário Camboriú, Santa Catarina	27°00′27″S 048°36′25″W	
SSYN		Guarani Farm Aerodrome	Nova Andradina, Mato Grosso do Sul	22°09′51″S 053°34′06″W	
SSYO		Usina São Simão Aerodrome	São Simão, Goiás	18°59′11″S 050°33′46″W	
SSYP		Gessomar Aerodrome	Codó, Maranhão	04°31′15″S 043°55′10″W	
SSYQ		Água das Pedras Farm Aerodrome	Anhembi, São Paulo	22°39′17″S 048°09′00″W	
SSYR		José Mendes Ribeiro Aerodrome	São João dos Patos, Maranhão	06°30′02″S 043°41′03″W	
SSYS		Aerodinâmica Aviação Agrícola Aerodrome	Miracatu, São Paulo	24°18′20″S 047°30′11″W	
SSYT		Business Style Heliport	Goiânia, Goiás	16°41′50″S 049°15′20″W	
SSYU		Concórdia Farm Aerodrome	Naviraí, Mato Grosso do Sul	22°51′07″S 054°12′30″W	
SSYV		Indaiá Farm Aerodrome	Chapadão do Sul, Mato Grosso do Sul	18°40′47″S 052°54′06″W	
SSYW		Terra Forte Farm Aerodrome	Coxim, Mato Grosso do Sul	18°15′19″S 054°46′43″W	Closed
SSYX		Mobi Heliport	Aparecida de Goiânia, Goiás	16°47′30″S 049°15′41″W	
SSYY		Fundãozinho Farm Aerodrome	Costa Rica, Mato Grosso do Sul	18°57′09″S 053°09′17″W	
SSYZ		Procomp II Farm Aerodrome	Aral Moreira, Mato Grosso do Sul	22°51′02″S 055°24′43″W	
SSZA		São Sebastião da Formosa Farm Aerodrome	Corumbá, Mato Grosso do Sul	17°43′20″S 056°45′12″W	Closed
SSZB		Chalana Farm Aerodrome	Diamantino, Mato Grosso	14°09′54″S 057°09′29″W	
SSZC		Aquiraz Riviera Heliport	Aquiraz, Ceará	03°55′26″S 038°19′44″W	
SSZD		Zirondi Aerodrome	Porto Velho, Rondônia	08°46′27″S 063°44′02″W	
SSZE		Banco Sofisa Heliport	São Paulo, São Paulo	23°33′46″S 046°39′21″W	
SSZF		Santa Gertrudes Farm Aerodrome	Corumbá, Mato Grosso do Sul	18°28′40″S 056°01′18″W	
SSZG		São João Farm Aerodrome	Paraíso das Águas, Mato Grosso do Sul	19°15′43″S 052°54′01″W	
SSZH		Agroterra Infiniti Aerodrome	Tacuru, Mato Grosso do Sul	23°38′44″S 054°42′51″W	
SSZI		Cidadelle Heliport	Itabuna, Bahia	14°47′12″S 039°14′44″W	
SSZJ		Semp Jordanésia Heliport	Cajamar, São Paulo	23°19′54″S 046°50′14″W	
SSZK		Água Santa Farm Aerodrome	Perdizes, Minas Gerais	19°21′54″S 047°21′32″W	
SSZL		Córrego Azul Farm Aerodrome	Brasilândia, Mato Grosso do Sul	21°26′30″S 052°09′27″W	
SSZM		Miguel Rodrigues de Barros Aerodrome	Edéia, Goiás	17°18′23″S 049°57′39″W	
SSZN		Carandazal Farm Aerodrome	Cáceres, Mato Grosso	16°42′36″S 058°06′53″W	
SSZO		Santa Marta I Aerodrome	Santa Maria das Barreiras, Pará	08°32′29″S 050°39′06″W	
SSZP		Santa Adriana Farm Aerodrome	Jateí, Mato Grosso do Sul	22°41′46″S 054°12′57″W	
SSZQ		Panorama Farm Aerodrome	Bela Vista, Mato Grosso do Sul	22°02′20″S 056°16′10″W	
SSZR	SRA	Santa Rosa Airport	Santa Rosa, Rio Grande do Sul	27°54′32″S 054°31′20″W	
SSZS		Sucupira Farm Aerodrome	Vila Rica, Mato Grosso	10°01′36″S 051°48′34″W	
SSZT		São João Farm Aerodrome	Águas de Santa Bárbara, São Paulo	22°47′22″S 049°20′21″W	
SSZU		João Pessoa Convention Centre Heliport	João Pessoa, Paraíba	07°11′23″S 034°48′11″W	
SSZV		Cifrão Farm Aerodrome	Pedra Preta, Mato Grosso	16°56′18″S 054°26′10″W	
SSZW		Usina Coruripe Branch Aerodrome	Limeira do Oeste, Minas Gerais	19°31′24″S 050°39′20″W	
SSZX		Ranchinho do Guaporé Farm Aerodrome	Pontes e Lacerda, Mato Grosso	15°41′52″S 059°55′33″W	
SSZY		Nascente Farm Aerodrome	Jaciara, Mato Grosso	16°04′20″S 055°05′48″W	
SSZZ		SESC Heliport	Itaparica, Bahia	12°53′00″S 038°40′49″W	

== SU - Uruguay ==
Also see airport category and list.

ICAO	IATA	Airport name	Community	Coordinates
SUAA		Ángel Adami International Airport	Montevideo, Montevideo	34°47′21″S 056°15′53″W
SUAG	ATI	Artigas International Airport	Artigas, Artigas	30°23′57″S 056°30′39″W
SUAN		Estancia Presidencial Anchorena Airport	Barra de San Juan, Colonia	34°16′13″S 057°57′51″W
SUBL		Cap. Juan Manuel Boiso Lanza Air Base	Montevideo, Montevideo	34°48′40″S 056°09′50″W
SUBU	BUV	Placeres Airport	Bella Unión, Artigas	30°19′10″S 057°33′33″W
SUCA	CYR	Laguna de los Patos International Airport	Colonia del Sacramento, Colonia	34°27′05″S 057°46′01″W
SUCM		Zagarzazú International Airport	Carmelo, Colonia	33°57′58″S 058°19′31″W
SUDU	DZO	Santa Bernardina International Airport	Durazno, Durazno	33°21′23″S 056°29′46″W
SUFB		Villa Independencia Airport	Fray Bentos, Río Negro	33°08′35″S 058°17′38″W
SUGA		General Artigas Air Base	Pando, Canelones	34°44′51″S 055°57′40″W
SULS	PDP	C/C Carlos A. Curbelo de Laguna del Sauce International Airport	Maldonado/Punta del Este, Maldonado	34°51′30″S 055°05′30″W
SUME		Ricardo Detomasi Airport	Mercedes, Soriano	33°14′55″S 058°04′22″W
SUMI		Campo Municipal de Aterrizaje Airport	Minas, Lavalleja	34°20′43″S 055°13′37″W
SUMO	MLZ	Cerro Largo International Airport	Melo, Cerro Largo	32°20′33″S 054°13′19″W
SUMU	MVD	Carrasco Gral. Cesáreo L. Berisso International Airport	Montevideo, Montevideo	34°50′02″S 056°01′41″W
SUPE		El Jagüel Airport	Maldonado/Punta del Este, Maldonado	34°54′47″S 054°55′09″W
SUPU	PDU	Tydeo Larre Borges International Airport	Paysandú, Paysandú	32°21′47″S 058°03′59″W
SURB		Río Branco Airport	Río Branco, Cerro Largo	32°34′54″S 053°27′14″W
SURV	RVY	Pte. Gral. Óscar D. Gestido International Airport	Rivera, Rivera	30°58′10″S 055°28′24″W
SUSO	STY	Nueva Hespérides International Airport	Salto, Salto	31°26′05″S 057°59′03″W
SUTB	TAW	Tacuarembó Airport	Tacuarembó, Tacuarembó	31°45′01″S 055°55′26″W
SUTR	TYT	Treinta y Tres Airport	Treinta y Tres, Treinta y Tres	33°11′42″S 054°20′50″W
SUVO	VCH	Vichadero Airport	Vichadero, Rivera	31°44′21″S 054°35′16″W
