= List of airports in Uruguay =

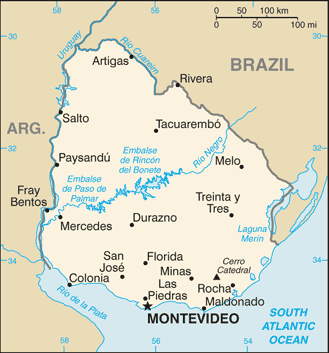
Map of Uruguay

This is a list of airports in Uruguay, sorted alphabetically by ICAO code.

Uruguay, officially known as the Oriental Republic of Uruguay (Spanish: República Oriental del Uruguay), is a country located in the southeastern part of South America. Uruguay's only land border is with Brazil, to the north. To the west lies the Uruguay River, to the southwest lies the estuary of Río de la Plata, with Argentina only a short commute across the banks of either of these bodies of water, while to the southeast lies the South Atlantic Ocean. Uruguay is the second smallest country in South America, being larger only than Suriname.

== Airports ==
Airport names shown in bold indicate the airport has scheduled service on commercial airlines.

Airport name	IATA code	ICAO code	City served	Department	Coordinates
Ángel Adami International Airport		SUAA	Montevideo	Montevideo	34°47′21″S 56°15′53″W
Artigas International Airport	ATI	SUAG	Artigas	Artigas	30°23′57″S 56°30′39″W
Estancia Presidencial Anchorena Airport		SUAN	Barra de San Juan	Colonia	34°16′13″S 57°57′51″W
Cap. Juan Manuel Boiso Lanza Air Base		SUBL	Montevideo	Montevideo	34°48′40″S 56°09′50″W
Placeres Airport	BUV	SUBU	Bella Unión	Artigas	30°19′10″S 57°33′33″W
Laguna de los Patos International Airport	CYR	SUCA	Colonia del Sacramento	Colonia	34°27′05″S 57°46′01″W
Zagarzazú International Airport		SUCM	Carmelo	Colonia	33°57′58″S 58°19′31″W
Santa Bernardina International Airport	DZO	SUDU	Durazno	Durazno	33°21′23″S 56°29′46″W
Villa Independencia Airport		SUFB	Fray Bentos	Río Negro	33°08′35″S 58°17′38″W
**C/C Carlos A. Curbelo de Laguna del Sauce International Airport**	PDP	SULS	Maldonado and Punta del Este	Maldonado	34°51′30″S 55°05′30″W
Ricardo Detomasi Airport		SUME	Mercedes	Soriano	33°14′55″S 58°04′22″W
Campo Municipal de Aterrizaje Airport		SUMI	Minas	Lavalleja	34°20′43″S 55°13′37″W
Cerro Largo International Airport	MLZ	SUMO	Melo	Cerro Largo	32°20′33″S 54°13′19″W
**Carrasco Gral. Cesáreo L. Berisso International Airport**	MVD	SUMU	Montevideo	Canelones	34°50′02″S 56°01′41″W
El Jagüel Airport		SUPE	Maldonado and Punta del Este	Maldonado	34°54′47″S 54°55′09″W
Tydeo Larre Borges International Airport	PDU	SUPU	Paysandú	Paysandú	32°21′47″S 58°03′59″W
Río Branco Airport		SURB	Río Branco	Cerro Largo	32°34′54″S 53°27′14″W
**Pte. Gral. Óscar D. Gestido Binational Airport**	RVY	SURV	Rivera and Santana do Livramento^{a}	Rivera	30°58′10″S 55°28′24″W
**Nueva Hespérides International Airport**	STY	SUSO	Salto	Salto	31°26′05″S 57°59′03″W
Tacuarembó Airport	TAW	SUTB	Tacuarembó	Tacuarembó	31°45′01″S 55°55′26″W
Treinta y Tres Airport	TYT	SUTR	Treinta y Tres	Treinta y Tres	33°11′42″S 54°20′50″W
Vichadero Airport	VCH	SUVO	Vichadero	Rivera	31°44′21″S 54°35′16″W

Note:
^{a}: Since August 14, 2023, SURV is a special case being a binational facility, serving both Uruguay and Brazil.

== See also ==
- Transport in Uruguay
- Uruguayan Air Force (Fuerza Aérea Uruguaya)
- List of airports by ICAO code: S#SU - Uruguay
- Wikipedia: WikiProject Aviation/Airline destination lists: South America#Uruguay
