= Barrocas =

Municipality of Bahia, Brazil

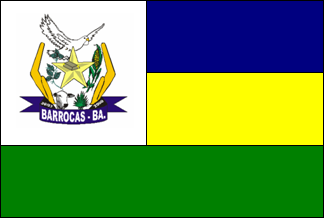
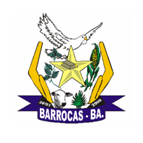
- Flag Coat of arms

- Location of Barrocas

- Location within Brazil
- Coordinates: 11°31′44″S 39°04′40″W
- Country: Brazil
- Region: Nordeste
- State: Bahia
- Founded: March 30, 2000

Government
  - Mayor: Jose Edilson de Lima Ferreira

Area
  - Total: 188,105 km^{2} (72,628 sq mi)
- Elevation: 385 m (1,263 ft)

Population (2020)
  - Total: 16,105
  - Density: 68.9/km^{2} (178/sq mi)
- Time zone: UTC−3 (BRT)
- Website: http://www.barrocas.ba.gov.br

Barrocas is a city in the Brazilian state of Bahia. It is located at around 11°31′44″S 39°4′40″W. It was founded in 2000.
