= Campo Alegre de Lourdes =

Municipality of Bahia, Brazil

Campo Alegre de Lourdes Município de Campo Alegre de Lourdes
- Municipality
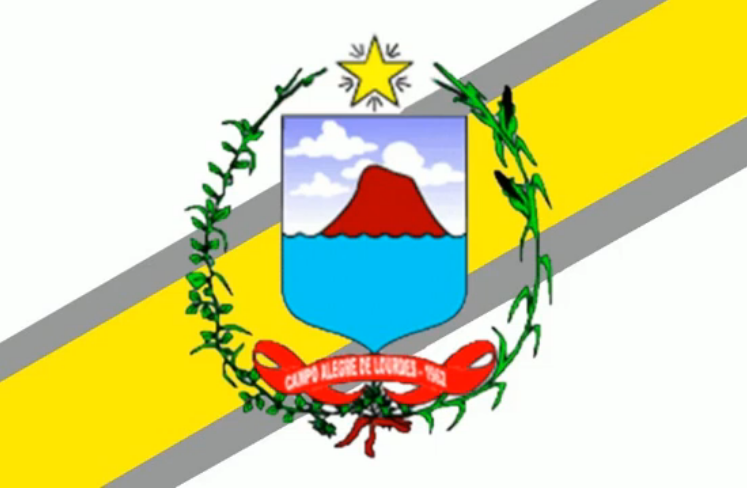
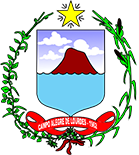
- Flag Coat of arms

- Location of Campo Alegre de Lourdes in Bahia

- Location of Campo Alegre de Lourdes in Brazil
- Coordinates: 09°30′57″S 43°00′39″W
- Country: Brazil
- Region: Northeast
- State: Bahia
- Founded: July 5, 1962

Government
  - Mayor: Delaneide Borges Dias (PSD, 2013-2016)

Area
  - Total: 2,781.170 km^{2} (1,073.816 sq mi)

Population (2020)
  - Total: 28,820
  - Density: 10.36/km^{2} (26.84/sq mi)
- Demonym: Campo-alegrense
- Time zone: UTC−3 (BRT)
- Website: campoalegredelourdes.ba.gov.br

Campo Alegre de Lourdes is a municipality in the state of Bahia in the North-East region of Brazil. Campo Alegre de Lourdes covers 2,781.170 km^{2} (1,073.816 mi^{2}), and has a population of 28,820 with a population density of 11 inhabitants per square kilometer. It is located at the north of the state on the border of Bahia and Piauí.

== See also ==
- List of municipalities in Bahia
