= Ricardo Detomasi Airport =

Ricardo de Tomasi International Airport
- IATA: none; ICAO: SUME

Summary
- Airport type: Public
- Serves: Mercedes
- Elevation AMSL: 68 ft / 21 m
- Coordinates: 33°14′55″S 58°04′25″W

Map
- Location of the airport in Uruguay

Runways
Direction	Length		Surface
Direction	m	ft	Surface
16/34	1,240	4,068	Grass
08/26	1,200	3,937	Grass
- Sources: GCM Google Maps

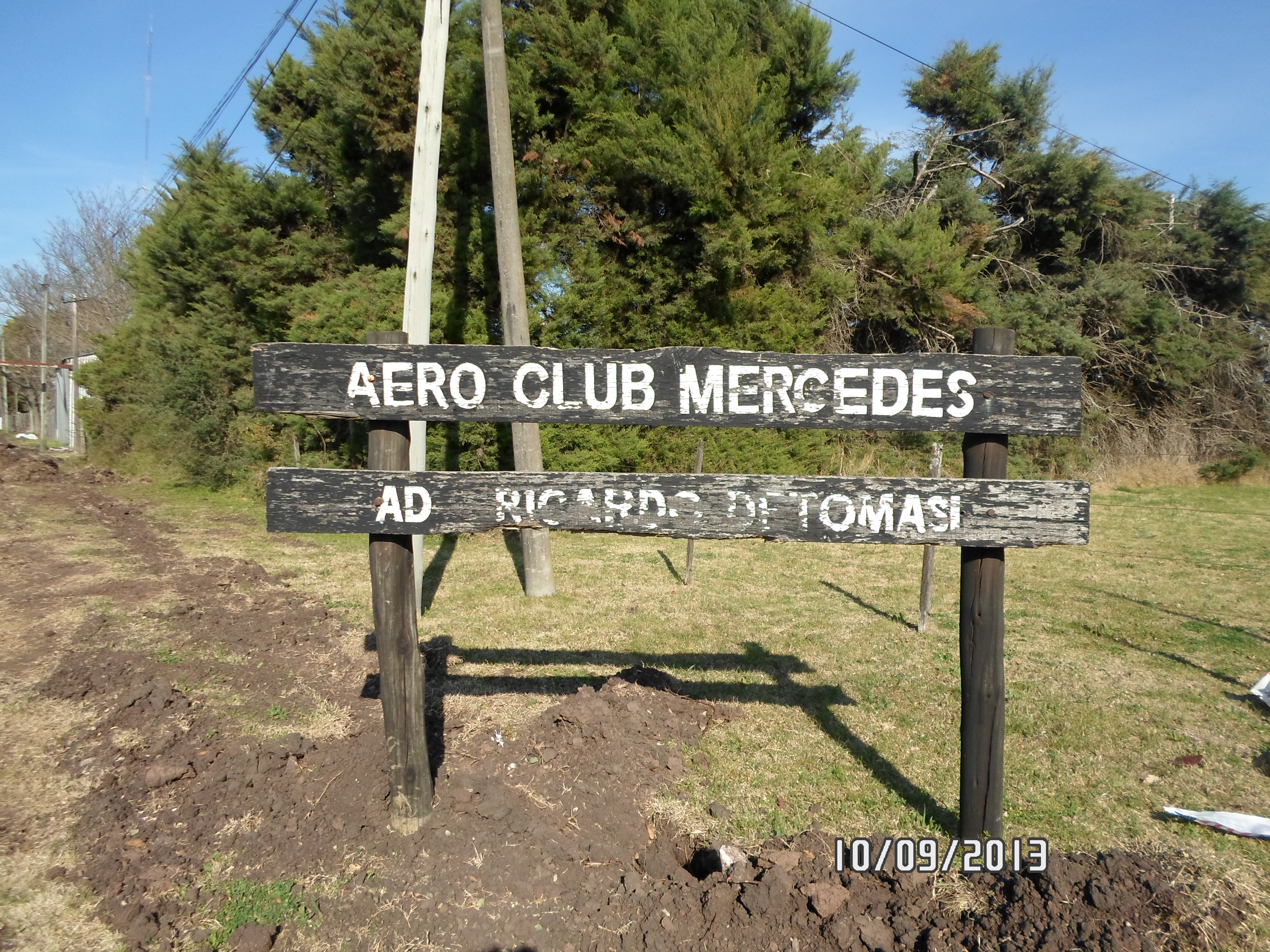

Ricardo de Tomasi International (ICAO: SUME) is an airport serving the town of Mercedes in Soriano Department, Uruguay.

The Mercedes non-directional beacon (ident: ME) is located at the airport.

== See also ==
- List of airports in Uruguay
- Transport in Uruguay
