= Ribeirão Cascalheira =

- Municipality
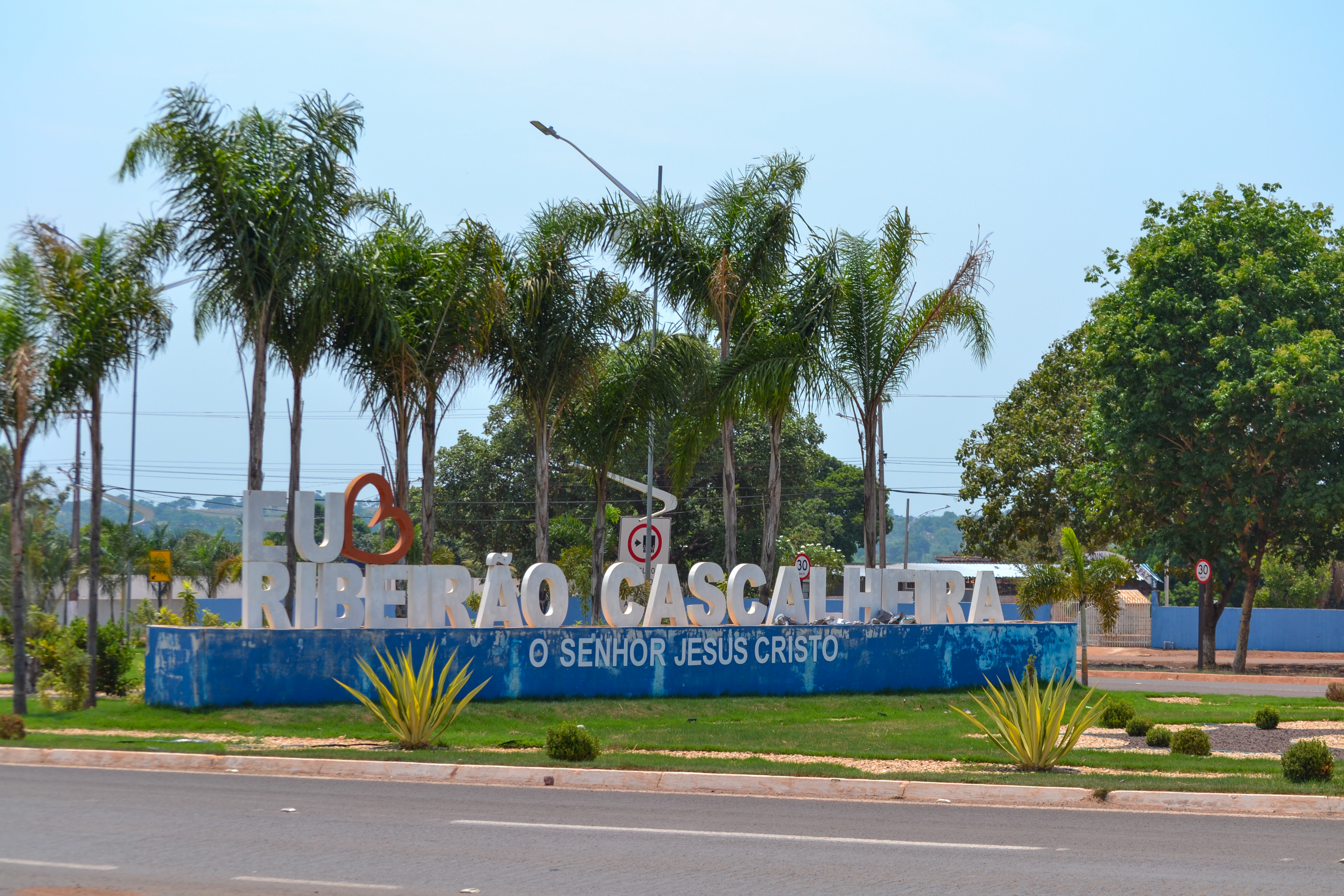

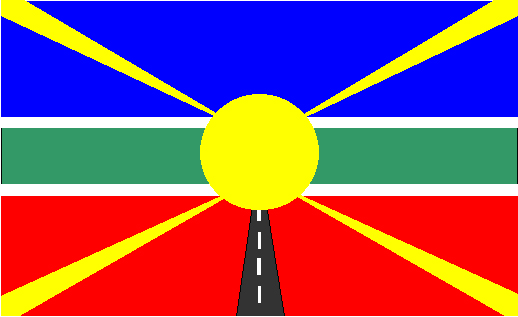
- Flag

- Location of Ribeirão Cascalheira in Mato Grosso.

- Location of Ribeirão Cascalheira in Brazil
- Coordinates: 12°56′31″S 51°49′26″W
- Country: Brazil
- Region: Center-West
- State: Mato Grosso
- Mesoregion: Nordeste Mato-Grossense

Population (2020)
  - Total: 10,329
- Time zone: UTC−3 (BRT)

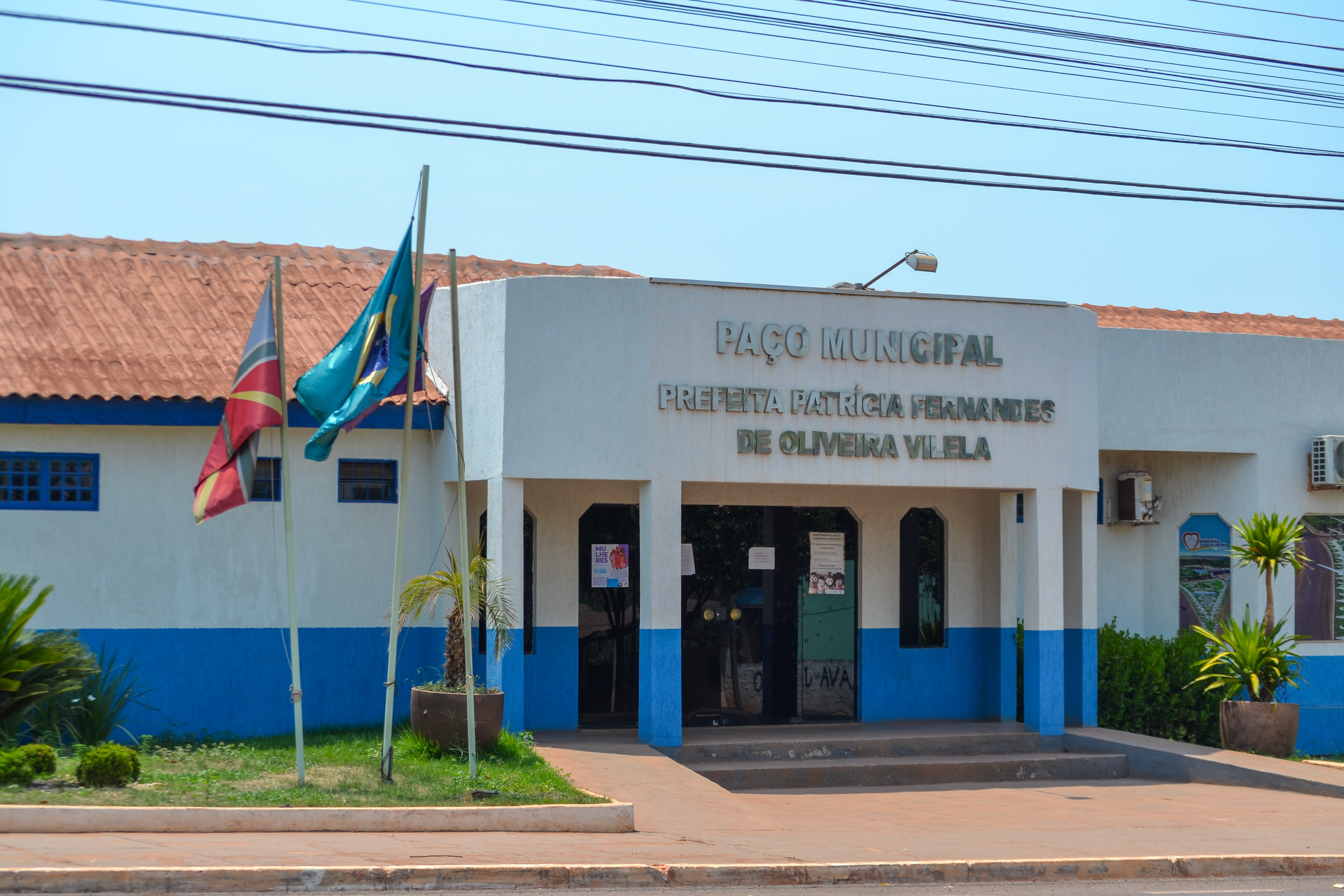
Ribeirão Cascalheira City Hall

Ribeirão Cascalheira is a municipality in the state of Mato Grosso in the Central-West Region of Brazil.

== See also ==
- List of municipalities in Mato Grosso
