= Pardinho =

- Municipality
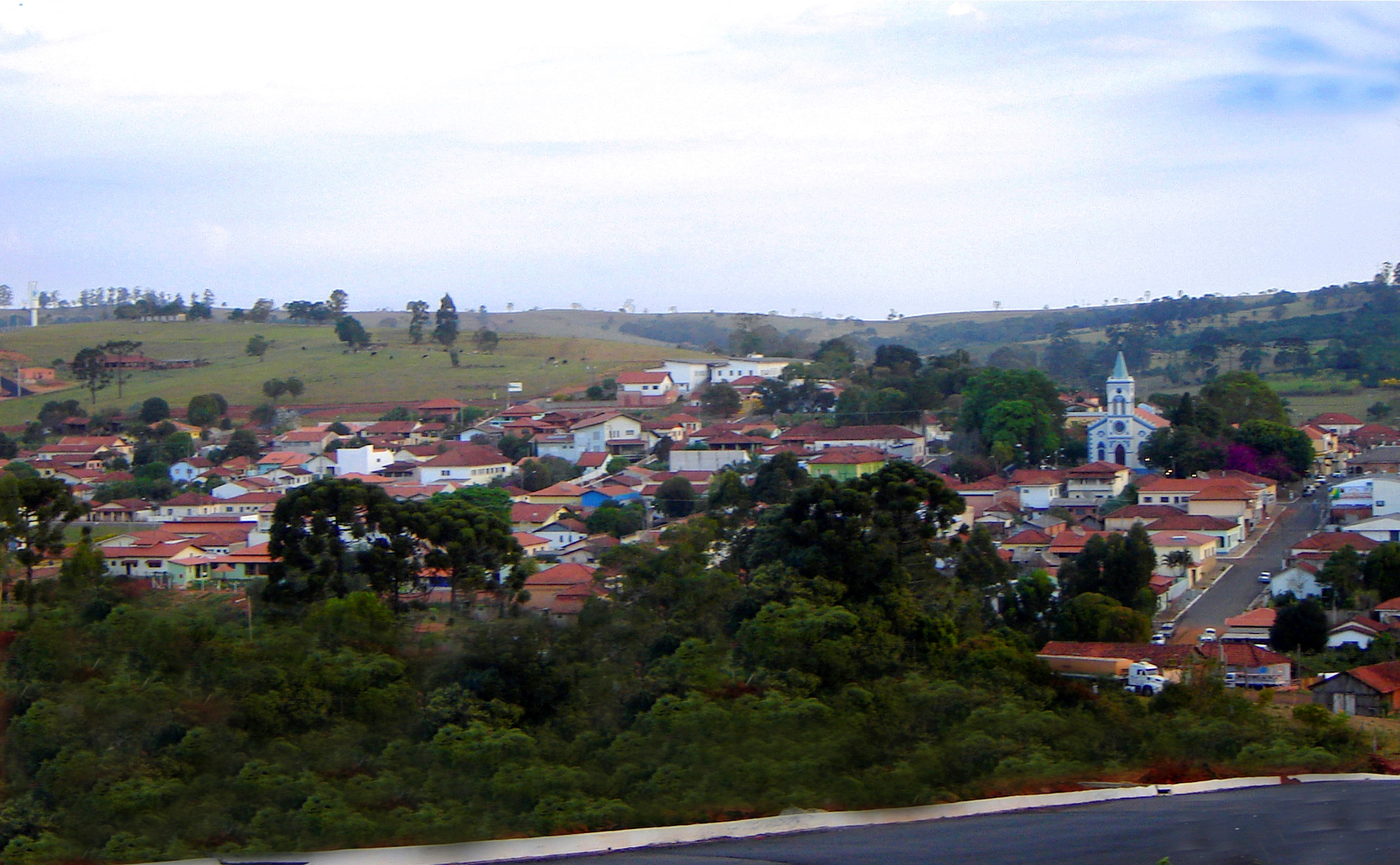
- View of Pardinho

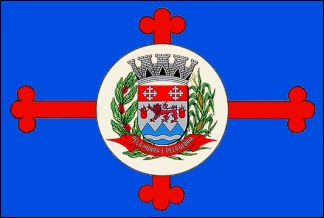
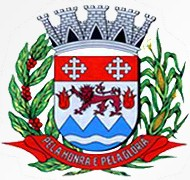
- Flag Coat of arms

- Location in São Paulo state

- Location in Brazil
- Coordinates: 23°4′52″S 48°22′25″W
- Country: Brazil
- Region: Southeast
- State: São Paulo

Area
  - Total: 210 km^{2} (81 sq mi)

Population (2020)
  - Total: 6,508
  - Density: 31/km^{2} (80/sq mi)
- Time zone: UTC−3 (BRT)

Pardinho is a municipality in the state of São Paulo in Brazil. The population is 6,508 (2020 est.) in an area of 210 km^{2}. The elevation is 898 m. Pardinho became an independent municipality in 1959, when it was separated from Botucatu.

== Media ==
In telecommunications, the city was served by Companhia Telefônica Brasileira until 1973, when it began to be served by Telecomunicações de São Paulo. In July 1998, this company was acquired by Telefónica, which adopted the Vivo brand in 2012.

The company is currently an operator of cell phones, fixed lines, internet (fiber optics/4G) and television (satellite and cable).

== See also ==
- List of municipalities in São Paulo
