= Río Branco Airport =

Airport serving Río Branco, Uruguay

- IATA: none; ICAO: SURB

Summary
- Airport type: Public
- Serves: Río Branco
- Elevation AMSL: 55 ft / 17 m
- Coordinates: 32°34′59″S 53°27′15″W

Map
- Location of the airport in Uruguay

Runways
Direction	Length		Surface
Direction	m	ft	Surface
14/32	860	2,822	Grass
- Sources: GCM Google Maps

Río Branco Airport (ICAO: SURB) is an airport serving the town of Río Branco in Cerro Largo Department, Uruguay. The runway is 6 kilometres (3.7 mi) west of town.

== See also ==
- List of airports in Uruguay
- Transport in Uruguay
