= Estancia Presidencial Anchorena Airport =

Airport serving Anchorena National Park, Uruguay

- IATA: none; ICAO: SUAN

Summary
- Airport type: Public
- Serves: Anchorena National Park
- Elevation AMSL: 33 ft / 10 m
- Coordinates: 34°16′15″S 57°57′50″W

Map
- Location of the airport in Uruguay

Runways
Direction	Length		Surface
Direction	m	ft	Surface
18/36	1,165	3,822	Grass
- Sources: GCM Google Maps

Estancia Presidencial Anchorena Airport (ICAO: SUAN) is an airport serving Anchorena National Park and the Presidential Estate at Barra de San Juan in Colonia Department, Uruguay. The airport lies along the Río San Juan, 2 kilometres (1 mi) from its confluence into the Río de la Plata estuary.

The San Fernando VOR-DME (Ident: FDO) is located 32.6 nautical miles (60 km) west-southwest of the airport. The Colonia non-directional beacon (Ident: COL) is located 14.6 nautical miles (27 km) southeast of the airport.

Airspace over the Presidential Estate is restricted.

== See also ==
- List of airports in Uruguay
- Transport in Uruguay
