= Colonia Airport =

Airport in Uruguay

Colonia International Airport Laguna de Los Patos International Airport
- IATA: CYR; ICAO: SUCA

Summary
- Airport type: Public
- Serves: Colonia del Sacramento, Uruguay
- Elevation AMSL: 42 ft / 13 m
- Coordinates: 34°27′25″S 57°46′10″W

Map
- Location in Uruguay

Runways
Direction	Length		Surface
Direction	m	ft	Surface
13/31	1,375	4,511	Asphalt
- Sources: SkyVector, GCM

Colonia Airport (Spanish: Aeropuerto Internacional de Colonia "Laguna de los Patos") (IATA: CYR, ICAO: SUCA) is a general aviation airport serving Colonia del Sacramento, in the Colonia Department of Uruguay.

== Location ==
The airport is located approximately 5 mi (8.0 km) from the city of Colonia del Sacramento, in the Colonia Department of Uruguay.

== Infrastructure ==
The airport has a single asphalt runway designated 13/31, measuring 1,370 m (4,490 ft) long and 30 m (98 ft) wide.

== Airlines and destinations ==
As of early 2026, there are no scheduled passenger airline services to or from the airport.

== See also ==
- Transport in Uruguay
- List of airports in Uruguay
