= El Jagüel Airport =

General aviation airport serving Maldonado, Uruguay

El Jagüel Airport Aeropuerto El Jagüel
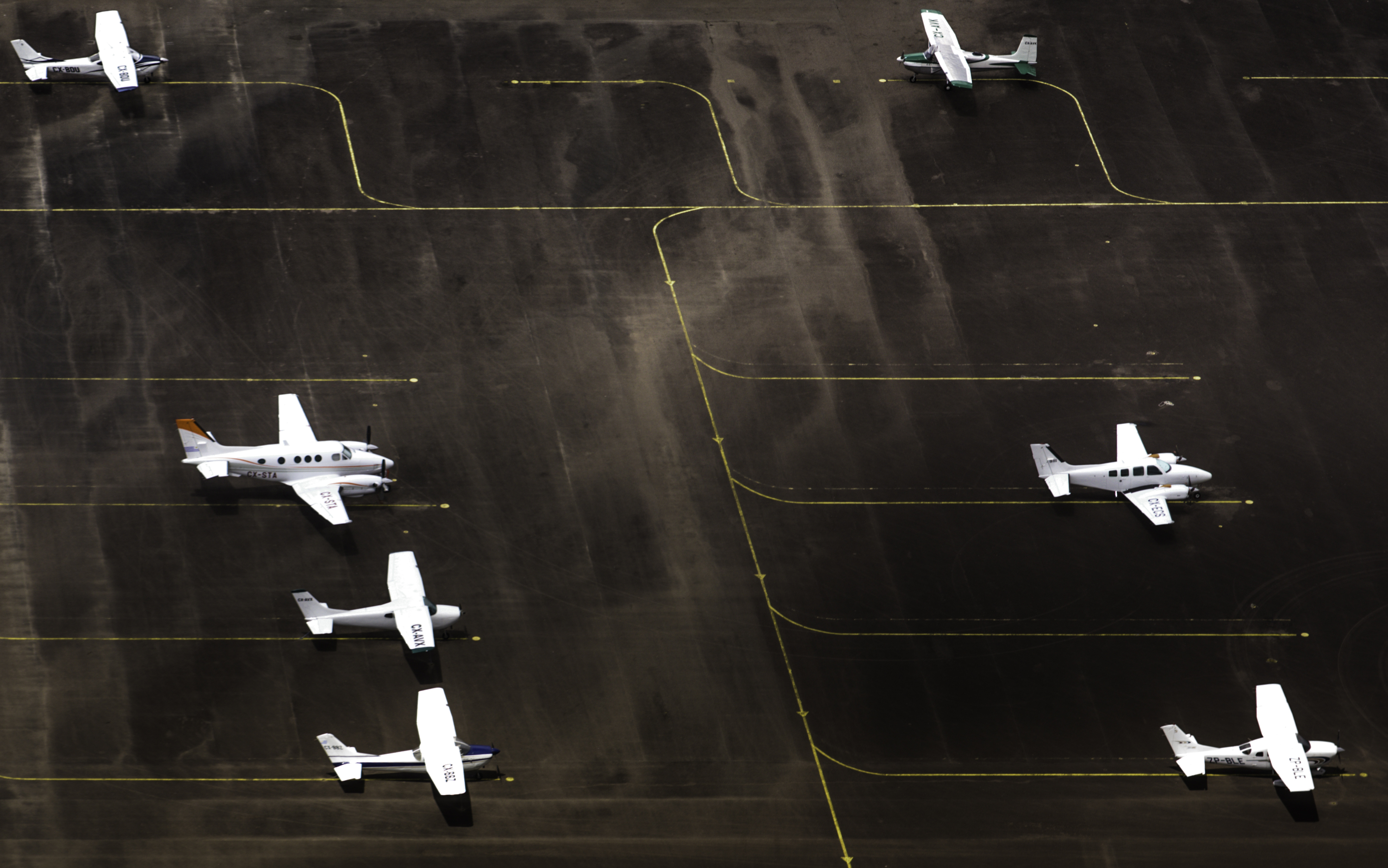
- IATA: none; ICAO: SUPE

Summary
- Airport type: Public
- Serves: Maldonado, Uruguay
- Location: Punta del Este
- Elevation AMSL: 66 ft / 20 m
- Coordinates: 34°54′35″S 54°55′12″W

Map
- Location in Uruguay

Runways
Direction	Length		Surface
Direction	m	ft	Surface
01/19	570	1,870	Asphalt
- Sources: GCM Google Maps SkyVector

El Jagüel Airport (ICAO: SUPE) is a general aviation airport serving Maldonado, Uruguay. The airport is in the El Jagüel neighborhood of Punta del Este, 1 mile (1.6 km) east of Maldonado.

El Jagüel was formerly the main Punta del Este airport, but a major highway was built that cut 560 metres (1,840 ft) from its length, leaving 910 metres (2,990 ft); a displaced threshold on Runway 01 further reduced the marked runway length to 570 metres (1,870 ft). Laguna del Sauce Airport now serves the main international and regional airlines.

The runway pavement still extends south across the Av Aparicio Saravia highway, with only a wire fence across the runway to prevent an overrun from encountering traffic.

The Curbelo VOR-DME (Ident: LDS) is located 9.3 nautical miles (17 km) west-northwest of the airport. The Curbelo non-directional beacon (Ident: LS) is located 9.6 nautical miles (18 km) west-northwest of the runway.

== See also ==
- Transport in Uruguay
- List of airports in Uruguay
