= Placeres Airport =

Placeres Airport Bella Unión Airport
- IATA: BUV; ICAO: SUBU

Summary
- Airport type: Public
- Serves: Bella Unión, Uruguay
- Elevation AMSL: 251 ft / 77 m
- Coordinates: 30°19′10″S 57°33′35″W

Map
- Location of the airport in Uruguay

Runways
Direction	Length		Surface
Direction	m	ft	Surface
15/33	1,017	3,337	Grass
- Sources: GCM Google Maps

Placeres Airport (IATA: BUV, ICAO: SUBU) is an airport serving the Uruguay River town of Bella Unión in Artigas Department, Uruguay. The airport is in the countryside 7 kilometres (4 mi) south-southeast of Bella Unión. There are 170 metres (560 ft) of unpaved overrun available on the northwest end.

The Monte Caseros VOR-DME (Ident: MCS) is located 5.1 nautical miles (9 km) northwest of the airport.

== See also ==
- List of airports in Uruguay
- Transport in Uruguay
