= Campo Municipal de Aterrizaje Airport =

Campo Municipal de Aterrizaje Airport Minas Municipal Airfield
- IATA: none; ICAO: SUMI

Summary
- Airport type: Public
- Serves: Minas, Uruguay
- Elevation AMSL: 443 ft / 135 m
- Coordinates: 34°20′45″S 55°13′40″W

Map
- Location of the airport in Uruguay

Runways
Direction	Length		Surface
Direction	m	ft	Surface
05/23	850	2,789	Grass
13/31	780	2,559	Grass
15/33	650	2,133	Grass
- Sources: GCM Google Maps

Campo Municipal de Aterrizaje Airport (ICAO: SUMI) is an airport serving the town of Minas in Lavalleja Department, Uruguay.

The airport is 2 kilometres (1.2 mi) north of the town. There is a low hill just south of the runway.

The Curbelo VOR-DME (Ident: LDS) is located 31.5 nautical miles (58 km) south-southeast of the airport. The Carrasco VOR-DME (Ident: CRR) is located 49.1 nautical miles (91 km) southwest of Minas Municipal Airfield.

== See also ==
- List of airports in Uruguay
- Transport in Uruguay
