= Ángel Adami Airport =

Ángel Adami Airport Aeropuerto Ángel Adami
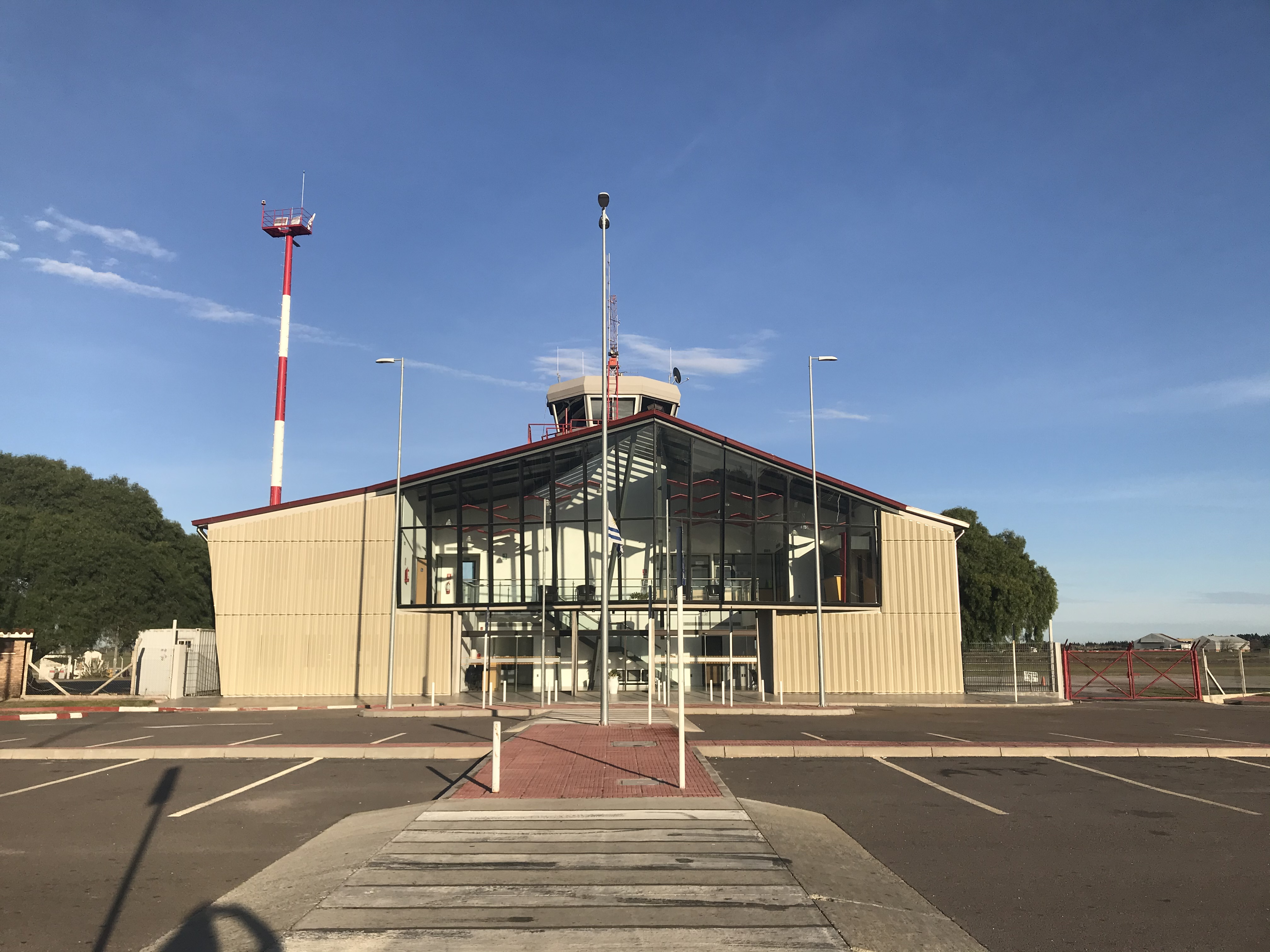
- Aeropuerto Internacional Ángel Adami en 2021.
- IATA: none; ICAO: SUAA

Summary
- Airport type: Public
- Serves: Montevideo, Uruguay
- Location: Melilla
- Elevation AMSL: 174 ft (53 m)
- Coordinates: 34°47′20″S 56°15′54″W

Map
- Location in Uruguay

Runways
Direction	Length		Surface
Direction	m	ft	Surface
19/01	1,250	4,101	Concrete
- Sources: WAD SkyVector Google Maps

Ángel Adami Airport (ICAO: SUAA) is a controlled general aviation airport serving Montevideo, Uruguay, located in the northwestern outskirts of the metropolitan area. The airport and its surrounding area are commonly known as "Aviación" or, due to its location in the neighborhood of Lezica-Melilla, as "Aeródromo de Melilla".

The Adami non-directional beacon (Ident: ASI) is located on the field. The Carrasco VOR-DME (Ident: CRR) is located 12.1 nautical miles (22 km) east-southeast of the airport.

== See also ==
- Transport in Uruguay
- List of airports in Uruguay
