= Tacuarembó Airport =

Tacuarembó Airport Aeropuerto de Tacuarembó
- IATA: TAW; ICAO: SUTB

Summary
- Airport type: Public
- Serves: Tacuarembó, Uruguay
- Elevation AMSL: 440 ft / 134 m
- Coordinates: 31°44′57″S 55°55′35″W

Map
- Location in Uruguay

Runways
Direction	Length		Surface
Direction	m	ft	Surface
10/28	1,200	3,937	Asphalt
- Sources: GCM Google Maps SkyVector

Tacuarembó Airport (IATA: TAW, ICAO: SUTB) is an airport serving Tacuarembó, the capital of Tacuarembó Department in Uruguay. The airport is in the countryside 5 kilometres (3 mi) east of the city.

The Tacuarembo non-directional beacon (Ident: TBO) and VOR-DME (Ident: TMB) are located on the field.

== See also ==
- Transport in Uruguay
- List of airports in Uruguay
