= Villa Independencia Airport =

- IATA: none; ICAO: SUFB

Summary
- Airport type: Public
- Serves: Fray Bentos
- Elevation AMSL: 118 ft / 36 m
- Coordinates: 33°08′30″S 58°17′38″W

Map
- Location of the airport in Uruguay

Runways
| Direction | Length | | Surface |
| Direction | m | ft | Surface |
|---|---|---|---|
| 01/19 | 900 | 2,953 | Grass |
| 16/34 | 550 | 1,804 | Grass |
- Sources: GCM Google Maps

Villa Independencia Airport (ICAO: SUFB) is an airport serving the Uruguay River port town of Fray Bentos in the Río Negro Department of Uruguay. The airport is on the south edge of the town.

The Gualeguaychu VOR-DME (Ident: GUA) is located 18.0 nautical miles (33 km) west-northwest of the airport.

== See also ==
- List of airports in Uruguay
- Transport in Uruguay
