= Vichadero Airport =

- IATA: VCH; ICAO: SUVO

Summary
- Airport type: Public
- Serves: Vichadero, Uruguay
- Elevation AMSL: 488 ft / 149 m
- Coordinates: 31°44′20″S 54°35′15″W

Map
- Location in Uruguay

Runways
Direction	Length		Surface
Direction	m	ft	Surface
04/22	965	3,166	Asphalt
- Sources: GCM Google Maps SkyVector

Vichadero Airport (IATA: VCH, ICAO: SUVO) is an airstrip serving Vichadero, a small town in the Rivera Department of Uruguay. The runway is in the countryside 10 kilometres (6 mi) northeast of the town.

The Bage VOR-DME (Ident: BGE) is located 34.4 nautical miles (64 km) northeast of the airport. The Vichadero non-directional beacon (Ident: VO) is located on the field.

== See also ==
- Transport in Uruguay
- List of airports in Uruguay
