= Nueva Hespérides International Airport =

Nueva Hespérides International Airport Aeropuerto Internacional de Nueva Hespérides
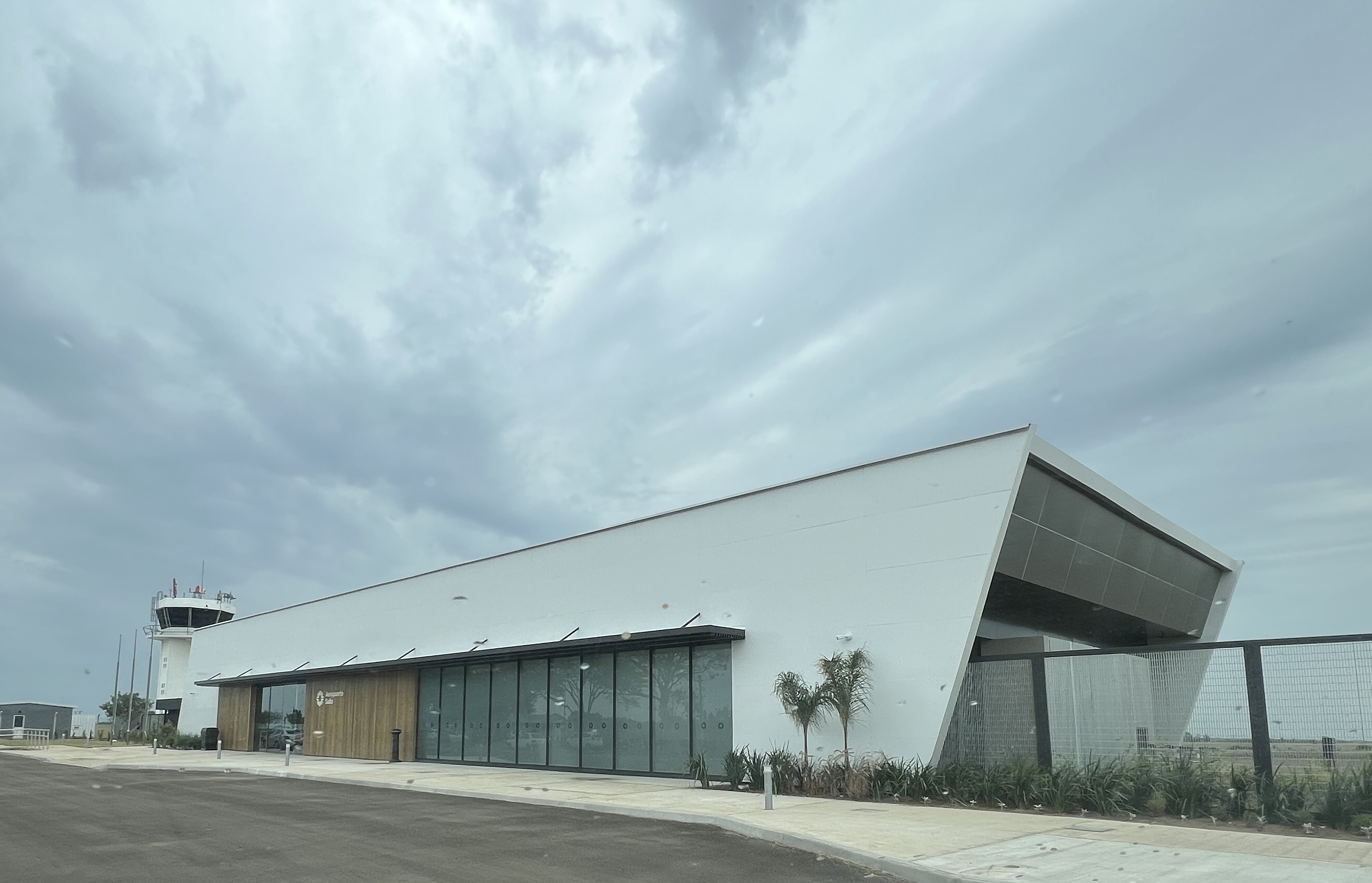
- Nueva Hespérides International Airport
- IATA: STY; ICAO: SUSO

Summary
- Airport type: Public
- Operator: Aeropuertos Uruguay
- Serves: Salto, Uruguay
- Elevation AMSL: 141 ft (43 m)
- Coordinates: 31°26′15″S 57°59′05″W

Map
- Location in Uruguay

Runways
| Direction | Length | | Surface |
| Direction | m | ft | Surface |
|---|---|---|---|
| 05/23 | 1,588 | 5,210 | Asphalt |
| 13/31 | 750 | 2,461 | Grass |
- Source: Skyvector, GCM

Nueva Hespérides International Airport (IATA: STY, ICAO: SUSO) is an airport serving Salto in the Salto Department of Uruguay. The airport was redeveloped in the early 2020s, and was opened after renovation in February 2024. The airport is served only by Paranair which connects the airport with the Carrasco International Airport in Montevideo since October 2024.

== History ==
The airport is located in Salto in the Salto Department in northern coastal region of Uruguay. The airport underwent modernization in the early 2020s at an estimated cost of US$ 13 million. It was part of the planned modernization programme to upgrade six airports in Uruguay. The programme included the upgradation of the runway, and control tower, improvement of security, a new terminal, and additional facilities for fire department and security agencies. The modernization was completed in early 2024, and the renovated airport was inaugurated by Uruguayan president Luis Lacalle Pou in February 2024.

== Infrastructure ==
The airport has two runways. The main airport is 1,588 m (5,210 ft)-long asphalt runway. There is a shorter 750 m (2,460 ft)-long shorted unpaved runway. The main runway was repaved, and equipped with new lightning, integral beacons, and Precision Approach Path Indicator during the renovation in 2024-25. An integrated terminal, spread over an area of 780 m^{2} (8,400 sq ft), caters to handling passengers.

== Accidents and incidents ==
On 20 June 1977, a Transporte Aéreo Militar Uruguayo Embraer EMB110C Bandeirante (registration CX-BJE/T584) flying in from Montevideo crashed after striking trees in a nearby orange grove during the approach to Salto airport. The crew of two and three of the 13 passengers died in the crash.

== See also ==
- Transport in Uruguay
- List of airports in Uruguay
