= Artigas Airport =

Artigas International Airport Aeropuerto Internacional de Artigas
- IATA: ATI; ICAO: SUAG

Summary
- Airport type: Public
- Serves: Artigas, Uruguay
- Location: Artigas, Uruguay
- Elevation AMSL: 410 ft / 125 m
- Coordinates: 30°24′03″S 56°30′30″W

Map
- Location in Uruguay

Runways
Direction	Length		Surface
Direction	m	ft	Surface
11/29	1,278	4,193	Asphalt
05/23	582	1,909	Grass
- Sources: GCM Google Maps SkyVector

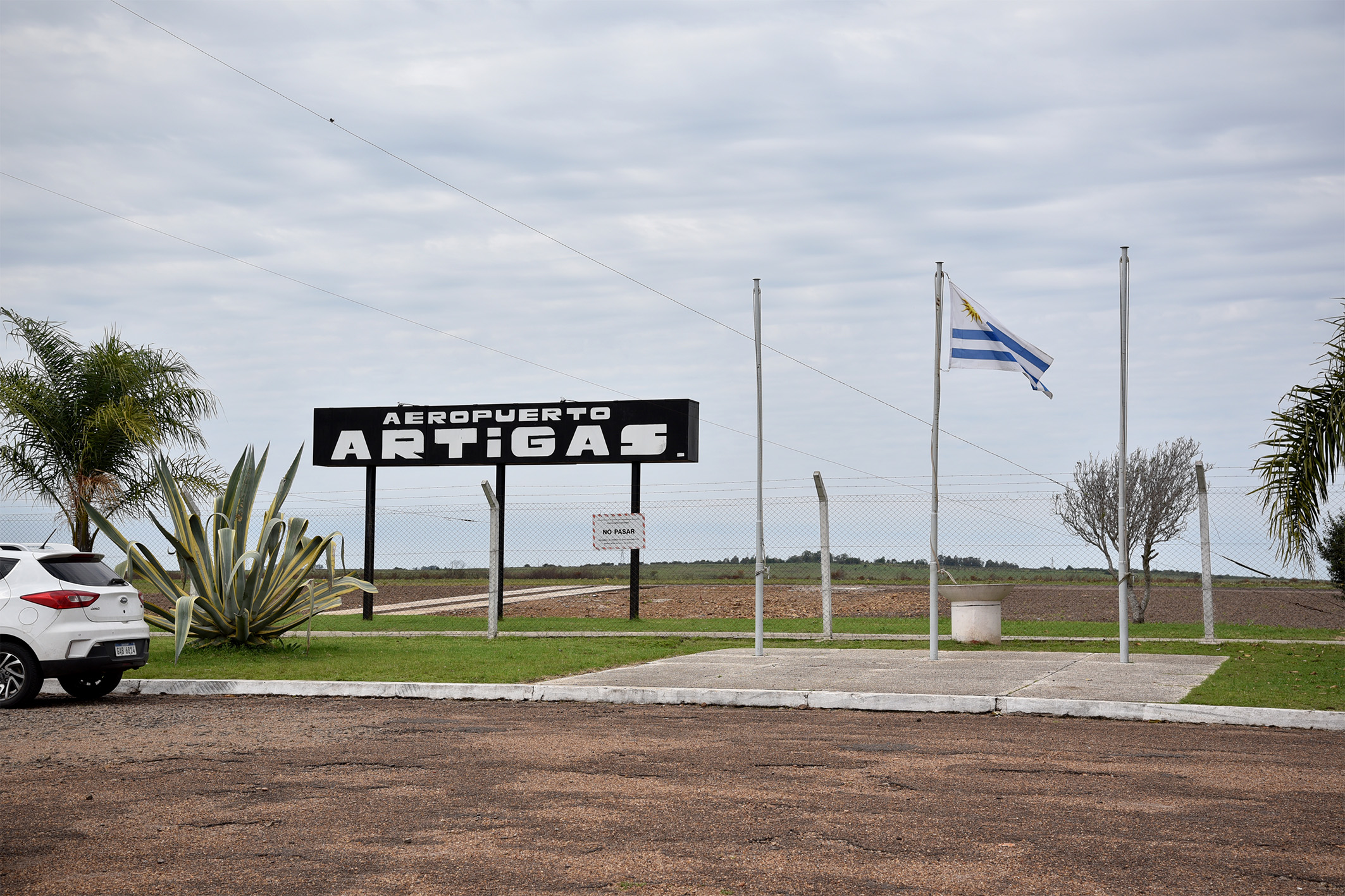
Emb George visit Artigas International Airport.jpg

Artigas International Airport (IATA: ATI, ICAO: SUAG) is an airport serving Artigas, capital of the Artigas Department of Uruguay. The airport is 2 kilometres (1 mi) west of the city, and is close to the border with Brazil.

The airport was opened in November 1973.

The Artigas non-directional beacon (Ident: AT) is located 0.7 nautical miles (1 km) off the threshold of Runway 29. The Monte Caseros VOR-DME (Ident: MCS) is located 59.1 nautical miles (109 km) west of the airport.

== Accidents and incidents ==
- 10 February 1978: a TAMU Douglas C-47A 75-DL registration CX-BJH/T511 flying from Artigas to Montevideo crashed shortly after take-off from Artigas on a domestic scheduled passenger flight. All 44 people on board, comprising 38 passengers and 6 crew, were killed, making this the second-worst crash involving a DC-3 (or derivative), and the worst aviation accident in Uruguay at the time. The airframe in question had first flown in 1943, and was damaged beyond repair in the accident.

== See also ==
- Transport in Uruguay
- List of airports in Uruguay
