= Treinta y Tres Airport =

Treinta y Tres Airport Aeropuerto de Treinta y Tres
- IATA: TYT; ICAO: SUTR

Summary
- Airport type: Public
- Serves: Treinta y Tres, Uruguay
- Elevation AMSL: 203 ft / 62 m
- Coordinates: 33°11′45″S 54°20′50″W

Map
- Location in Uruguay

Runways
Direction	Length		Surface
Direction	m	ft	Surface
01/19	1,070	3,510	Grass
10/28	740	2,428	Grass
- Sources: GCM Google Maps SkyVector

Treinta y Tres Airport (IATA: TYT, ICAO: SUTR) is an airport serving Treinta y Tres, capital of the Treinta y Tres Department of Uruguay. The airport is just northeast of the city.

The Melo VOR-DME (Ident: MLO) is located 51.6 nautical miles (96 km) north of the airport.

== See also ==
- Transport in Uruguay
- List of airports in Uruguay
