= Cerro Largo International Airport =

Airport serving Melo, Uruguay

Cerro Largo International Airport Aeropuerto Internacional de Cerro Largo
- IATA: MLZ; ICAO: SUMO

Summary
- Airport type: Public
- Operator: Aeropuertos Uruguay
- Serves: Melo, Uruguay
- Elevation AMSL: 364 ft / 111 m
- Coordinates: 32°20′15″S 54°13′00″W

Map
- Location in Uruguay

Runways
Direction	Length		Surface
Direction	m	ft	Surface
07/25	1,510	4,954	Asphalt
- Sources: SkyVector, GCM

Cerro Largo International Airport (Spanish: Aeropuerto Internacional de Cerro Largo) (IATA: MLZ, ICAO: SUMO), also known as Melo International Airport, is an airport serving Melo in the Cerro Largo Department of Uruguay. It is operated by Aeropuertos Uruguay.

== Location ==
The airport is located in Melo in the Cerro Largo Department of Uruguay close to the Brazilian border. The airport is located approximately 3 mi (4.8 km) from Melo.

== History ==
On 20 October 2022, the management of the airport was transferred to Aeropuertos Uruguay, and the airport was incorporated into the Sistema Nacional de Aeropuertos Internacionales (National System of International Airports). At the handover ceremony, the Uruguayan defence minister said that the renovation of the airport would commence in early 2024, at an estimated cost of US$10 million, consisting of US$7.5 million for upgrade of runway infrastructure and US$2.5 million for the passenger terminal.

The renovation works, carried out at a cost of US$12 million, included the repaving of the main runway, construction of a new taxiway and apron, the installation of new lighting and visual aid systems on the runway, construction of a perimeter fence and access road, installation of new communications equipment and CCTV, and the addition of a new fuel plant, fire station, and automatic weather station. The passenger terminal was expanded and renovated. The renovated airport was inaugurated on 15 October 2024 by the Uruguayan president Luis Lacalle Pou, and it was the fourth airport modernised by Aeropuertos Uruguay.

== Infrastructure ==
The airport has a single 1,510 m (4,950 ft)-long paved runway. The main runway was repaved, and equipped with new lightning during the renovation in 2024. The Melo VOR-DME (Ident: MLO) and non-directional beacon (Ident: MO) are located on the field of the airport. Tower communications are conducted on frequencies 118.60 and 122.10.

== Airlines and destinations ==
As of early 2026, there are no scheduled passenger airline services to or from the airport.

== See also ==
- Transport in Uruguay
- List of airports in Uruguay
