= Goioxim =

Coordinates: 25°14′S 52°01′W

- Municipality
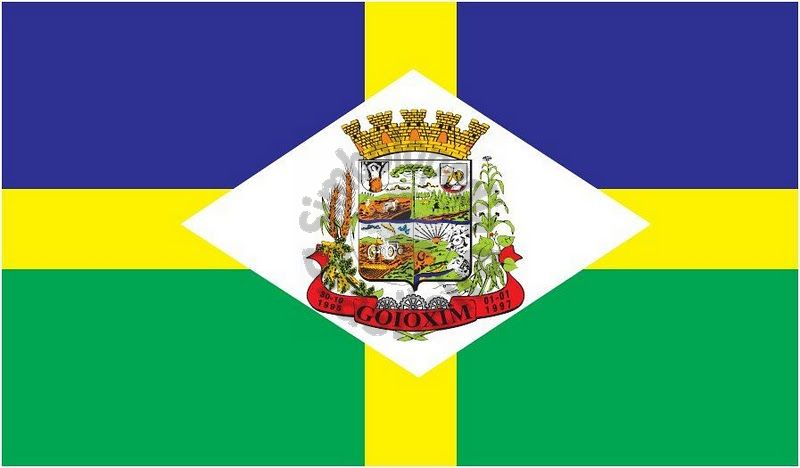
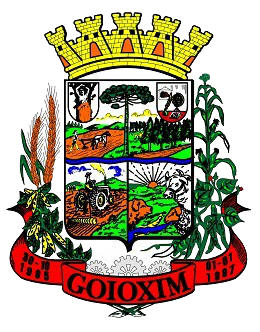
- Flag Coat of arms
- Interactive map of Goioxim
- Country: Brazil
- Region: Southern
- State: Paraná
- Mesoregion: Centro-Sul Paranaense

Population (2020)
  - Total: 7,053
- Time zone: UTC−3 (BRT)

Goioxim is a municipality in the state of Paraná in the Southern Region of Brazil.

== See also ==
- List of municipalities in Paraná
