= Vichadero =

- Town
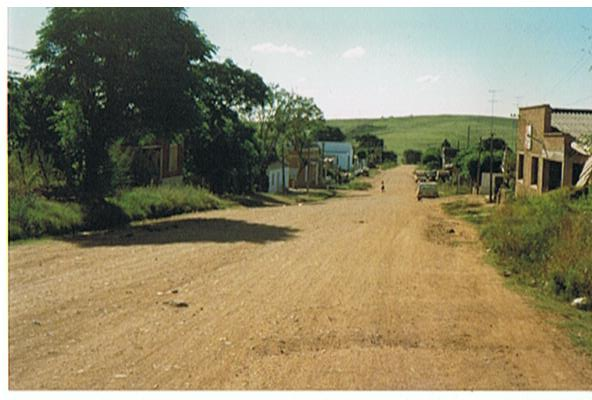
- Side road in Vichadero

- Location in Uruguay
- Coordinates: 31°47′0″S 54°42′0″W
- Country: Uruguay
- Department: Rivera Department

Population (2011)
  - Total: 3,698
- Time zone: UTC -3
- Postal code: 40003
- Dial plan: +598 465 (+5 digits)

Vichadero is a small village in the Rivera Department of northeastern Uruguay.

== Geography ==
The village is located on Route 6, and its junction with Route 27. Its closest city is Melo, the capital of the Cerro Largo Department, about 105 kilometres (65 mi) to the southeast (via routes 6, 44 & 7).

== History ==
On 4 September 1950, it was declared a "Pueblo" (village) by the Act of Ley Nº 11.484, and then on 3 May 1984 its status was elevated to "Villa" (town) by the Act of Ley Nº 15.538.

An important feature of this small town is its airport.

== Population ==
In 2011, Vichadero had a population of 3,698.

Year	Population
1963	1,319
1975	3,156
1985	2,529
1996	3,343
2004	4,074
2011	3,698

Source: Instituto Nacional de Estadística de Uruguay

== Places of worship ==
La Iglesia de Jesucristo de Los Santos de Los Últimos Días, Figueroa Vichadero

- Parish Church of Mary Help of Christians (Roman Catholic)

== Notable people ==
- Jonathan Álvez, football striker
- Diego Casas, football striker
