= Empresa de Transportes Aéreos Catarinense =

Brazilian airline

TAC – Empresa de Transportes Aéreos Catarinense
- Founded: 1947 as TAL; 1950 as TAC
- Commenced operations: 1948
- Ceased operations: 1966
- Headquarters: Florianópolis, Brazil
- Key people: J. D. F. Lima

TAC – Empresa de Transportes Aéreos Catarinense S/A was a Brazilian airline founded in 1947 that operated mainly in the south and southeast regions of Brazil. It was absorbed by Cruzeiro do Sul in 1966.

== History ==
TAC was founded in December 1947 in Rio de Janeiro, Brazil with the name TAL – Transportes Aéreos Ltda. Its operations started in May of the following year, linking Rio de Janeiro and Curitiba. In August 1950 the name was changed to TAC and the headquarters to Florianópolis, from where it built a network of services linking Florianópolis and cities of the state of Santa Catarina to Curitiba and Rio de Janeiro to the north, and Porto Alegre to the south. In 1956 it operated to 11 cities.

Around this time an operational agreement was signed with Cruzeiro do Sul in which TAC operated as some sort of feeder to the services of Cruzeiro do Sul. On January 1, 1966, TAC was bought and merged into Cruzeiro do Sul.

== Destinations ==
In 1957 TAC operated to the following states and cities in south and southeast Brazil:

- Chapecó – Serafin Enoss Bertaso Airport
- Curitiba – Afonso Pena International Airport
- Florianópolis – Hercílio Luz International Airport
- Itajaí
- Joaçaba – Santa Terezinha Airport
- Joinville – Lauro Carneiro de Loyola Airport
- Lages
- Paranaguá
- Porto Alegre – Salgado Filho International Airport
- Rio de Janeiro – Santos Dumont Airport
- Santos
- Videira – Ângelo Ponzoni Airport

== Fleet ==
TAC fleet
Aircraft	Total	Years of operation	Notes
Douglas DC-3	5	1948–1966	

== See also ==
- List of defunct airlines of Brazil
