= TransBrasil (airline) =

Brazilian airline

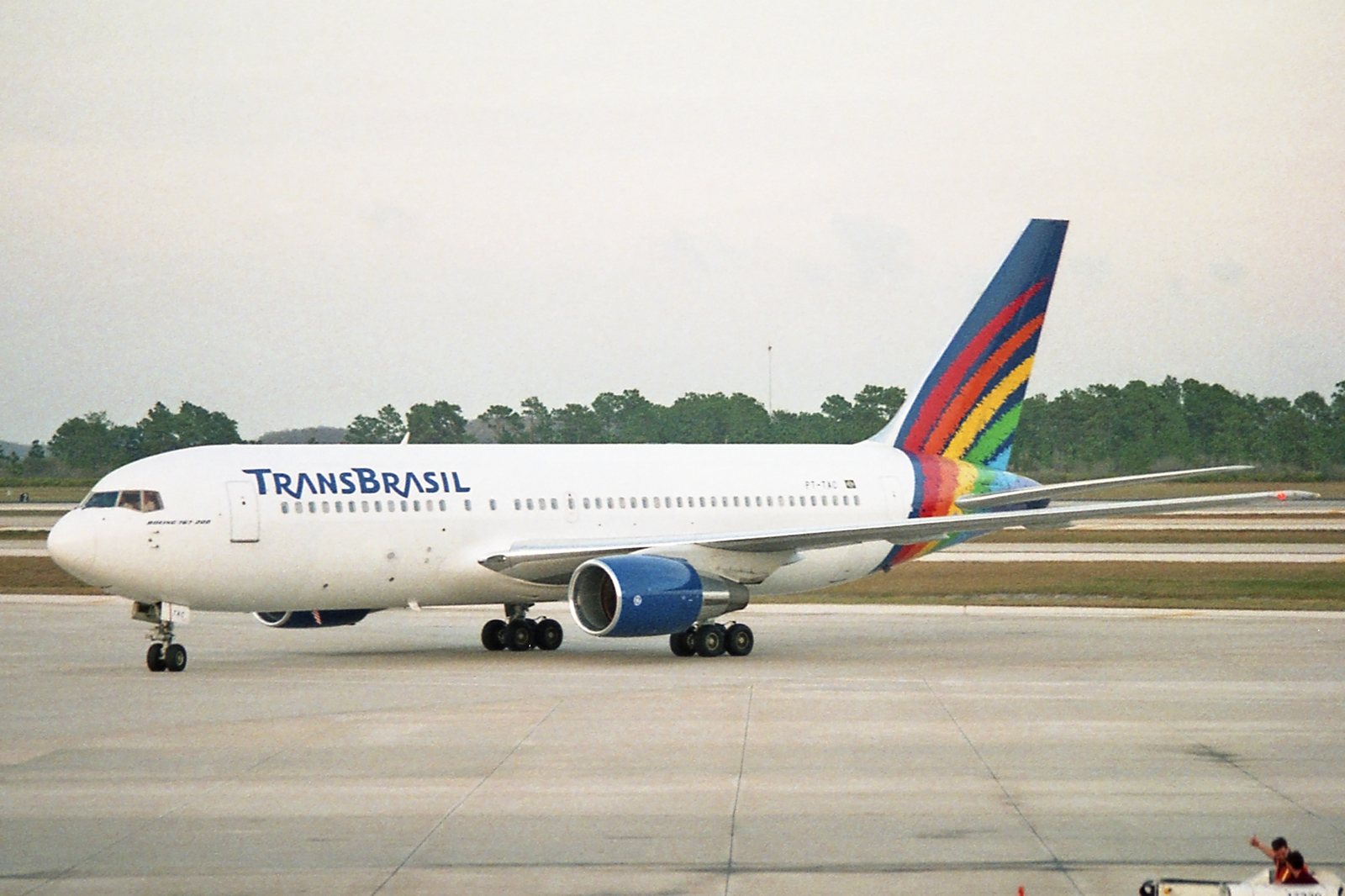
- A Boeing 767-200 departing at Orlando International Airport in March 2001
IATA	ICAO	Call sign
QD (as Sadia); TR (as Transbrasil)	TBA	TRANSBRASIL
- Founded: 5 January 1955; 71 years ago
- Commenced operations: 16 March 1956; 70 years ago
- Ceased operations: 3 December 2001; 24 years ago
- Hubs: São Paulo, Brazil
- Frequent-flyer program: TransPass
- Subsidiaries: Aerobrasil; Interbrasil STAR
- Headquarters: Brasília, Brazil
- Key people: Omar Fontana
- Website: transbrasil.com.br

TransBrasil was a Brazilian airline which ceased operations on 3 December 2001. During most of its history, Transbrasil was owned by local entrepreneur Omar Fontana. Its aircraft usually featured a colorful livery, remarkably with a rainbow on the tail fin. Transbrasil's base was President Juscelino Kubitschek International Airport in Brasília. From the 1970s and until its demise in 2002, Transbrasil was usually the third largest Brazilian airline after Varig and VASP, serving both domestic and international routes.

== History ==
=== First years as Sadia (1955–1972) ===
Logo used between 1966 and 1972.

Transbrasil was born in the State of Santa Catarina as a sister company of S/A Indústria e Comércio Concórdia, better known by its acronym Sadia. In 1953 Omar Fontana, a pilot and one of the sons of the founder of Sadia Attilio Fontana, noticed that a Douglas DC-3 remained parked at Joaçaba Airport, near Concórdia, for the entire weekend. Omar Fontana came up with the idea of leasing the aircraft for transporting the products of Sadia to São Paulo. In 1954 Sadia acquired its own Douglas DC-3 and started daily flights to São Paulo–Congonhas Airport, having Omar as one of its crew members. However, since it was not an airline with a regular schedule, it could not receive subventions from the government. In order to avoid this restriction, on January 5, 1955 Omar Fontana founded Sadia S/A – Transportes Aéreos with 35 employees, 3 Douglas DC-3s and 2 Curtiss C-46s. The first regular flight was operated on March 16, 1956.

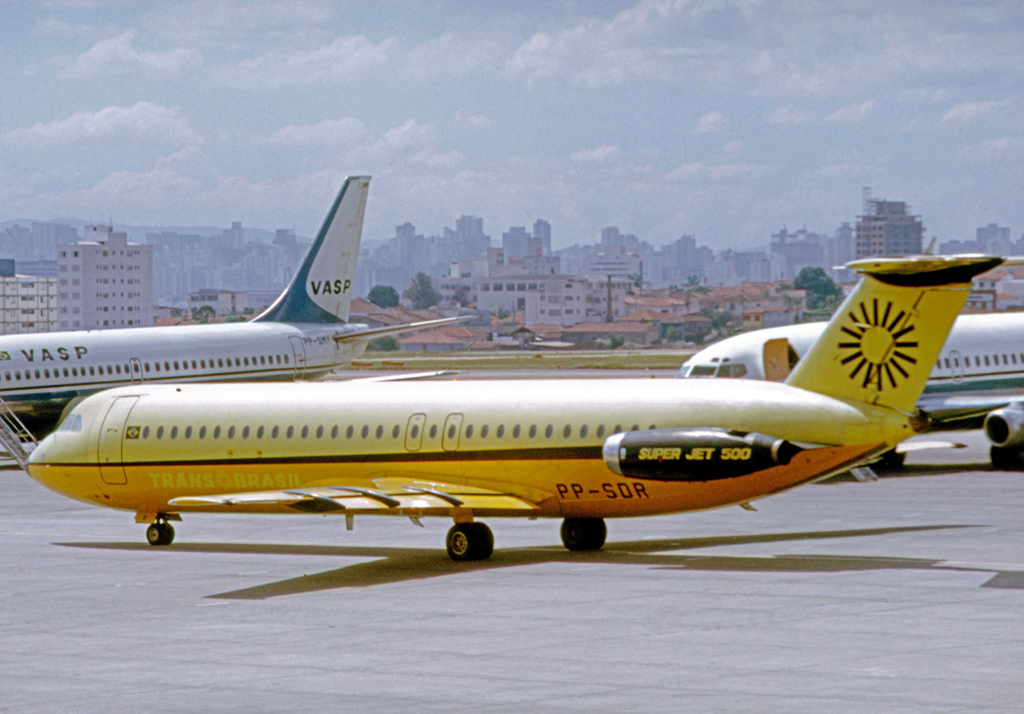
A BAC 1-11 series 500 at São Paulo Congonhas Airport in 1975

Sadia enlarged Concórdia Airport so that a Douglas DC-3 could operate with full load and created the first route linking Concórdia with Videira, Florianópolis, and São Paulo–Congonhas. A short time later, Sadia was also operating to Londrina, Bauru, Ribeirão Preto and Brasília.

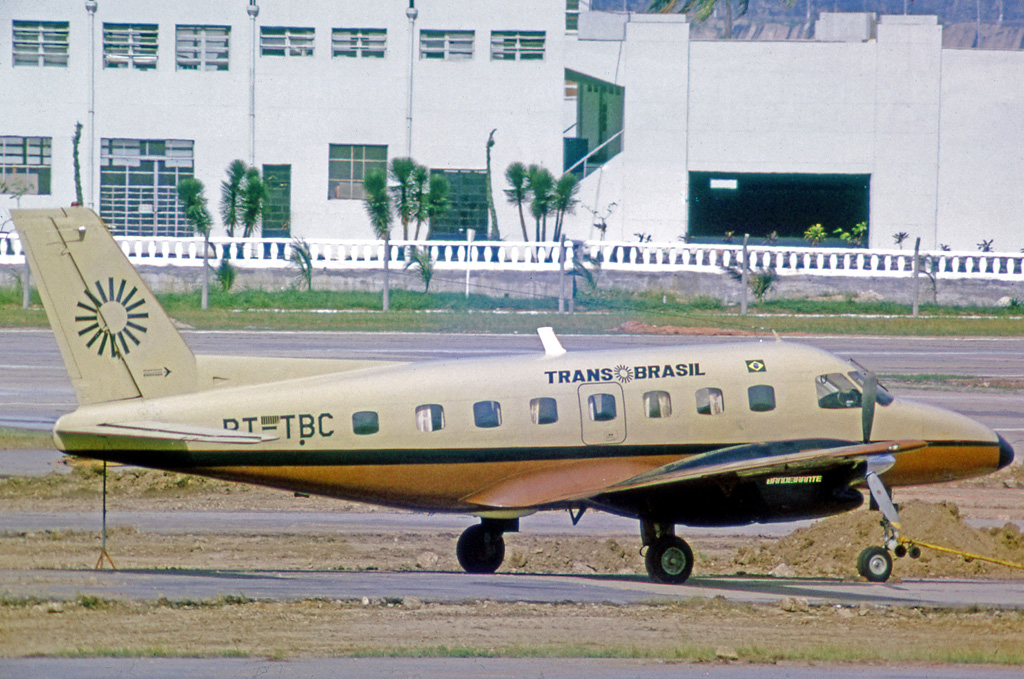
An Embraer EMB-110 Bandeirante at Rio Santos Dumont airport in 1975

In November 1957, Sadia established a partnership with Real Transportes Aéreos and became a feeder airline at Florianópolis. Whereas Real's Linneu Gomes got 50% of the shares of Sadia, Omar Fontana became part of the managing board of Real, where he gained airline experience. At this time Sadia moved its headquarters to São Paulo and expanded services to Rio de Janeiro–Santos Dumont and Porto Alegre. This partnership ended in 1961 with the demise of Real and Fontana bought back the shares he had earlier sold to Gomes.

In 1962 Sadia bought TASSA–Transportes Aéreos Salvador S/A and increased its presence in Bahia. Its fleet had now 15 Douglas DC-3s and 12 Curtiss C-46s serving 53 cities.

In 1967 most of Sadia network was eligible to receive subventions from the Federal government and aiming at those subventions Sadia bought five Handley Page Dart Heralds. In 1968 Sadia joined the shuttle service (Portuguese: Ponte Aérea, meaning "air bridge") between Rio de Janeiro-Santos Dumont and São Paulo-Congonhas airports, operated since 1959 by Varig, Cruzeiro do Sul and VASP. This service was abandoned only in 1999.

The first jet airliner type to be introduced into the fleet of Sadia, a stretched BAC One-Eleven Series 500, entered into service on September 17, 1970. In 1972 the name of the airline was changed to Transbrasil S/A Linhas Aéreas and its headquarters were moved to Brasília.

=== Consolidation as Transbrasil (1972–1983) ===
Logo used between 1972 and 1979.

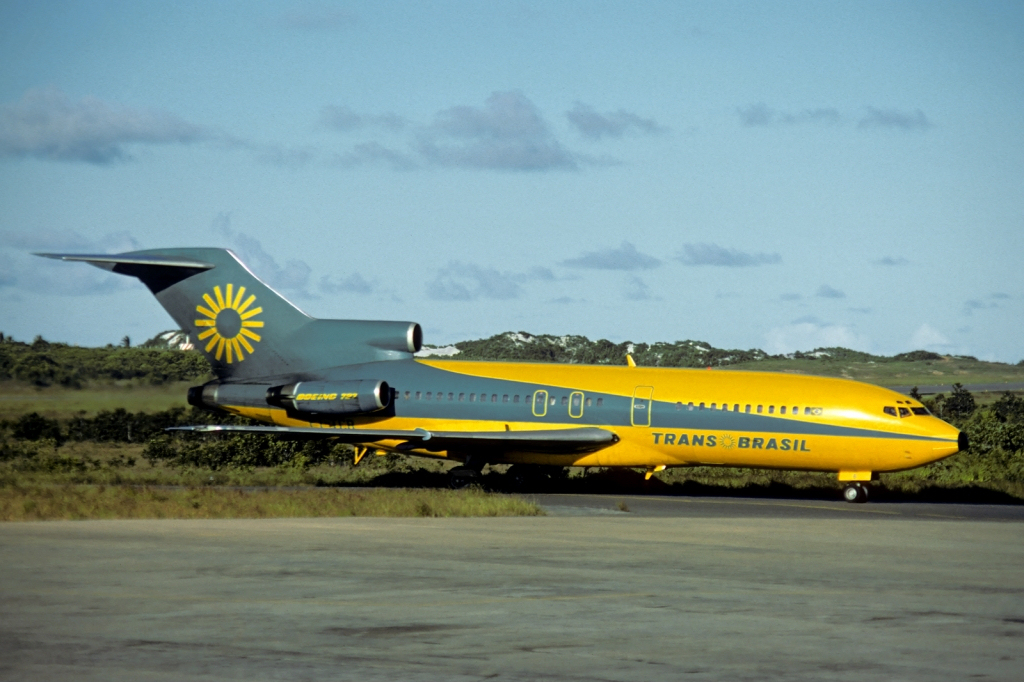
A Boeing 727-100 at Salvador International Airport

- 1973 - Transbrasil replaces its ageing Dart Heralds with new Embraer EMB 110 Bandeirante light transport turboprops.
- 1974 - Transbrasil starts to phase out its remainder Bandeirantes, Heralds and 1-11s, replacing them with Boeing 727-100. By 1979, its fleet consisted only of 727-100s.
- 1983 - Its first Boeing 767-200 is delivered, and Transbrasil starts its international operations, initially with charter flights - and from 1989, with regular service - to Miami, Orlando and Washington D.C.

=== Apogee and downturn (1983–2003) ===
Logo used between 1979 and 1998.

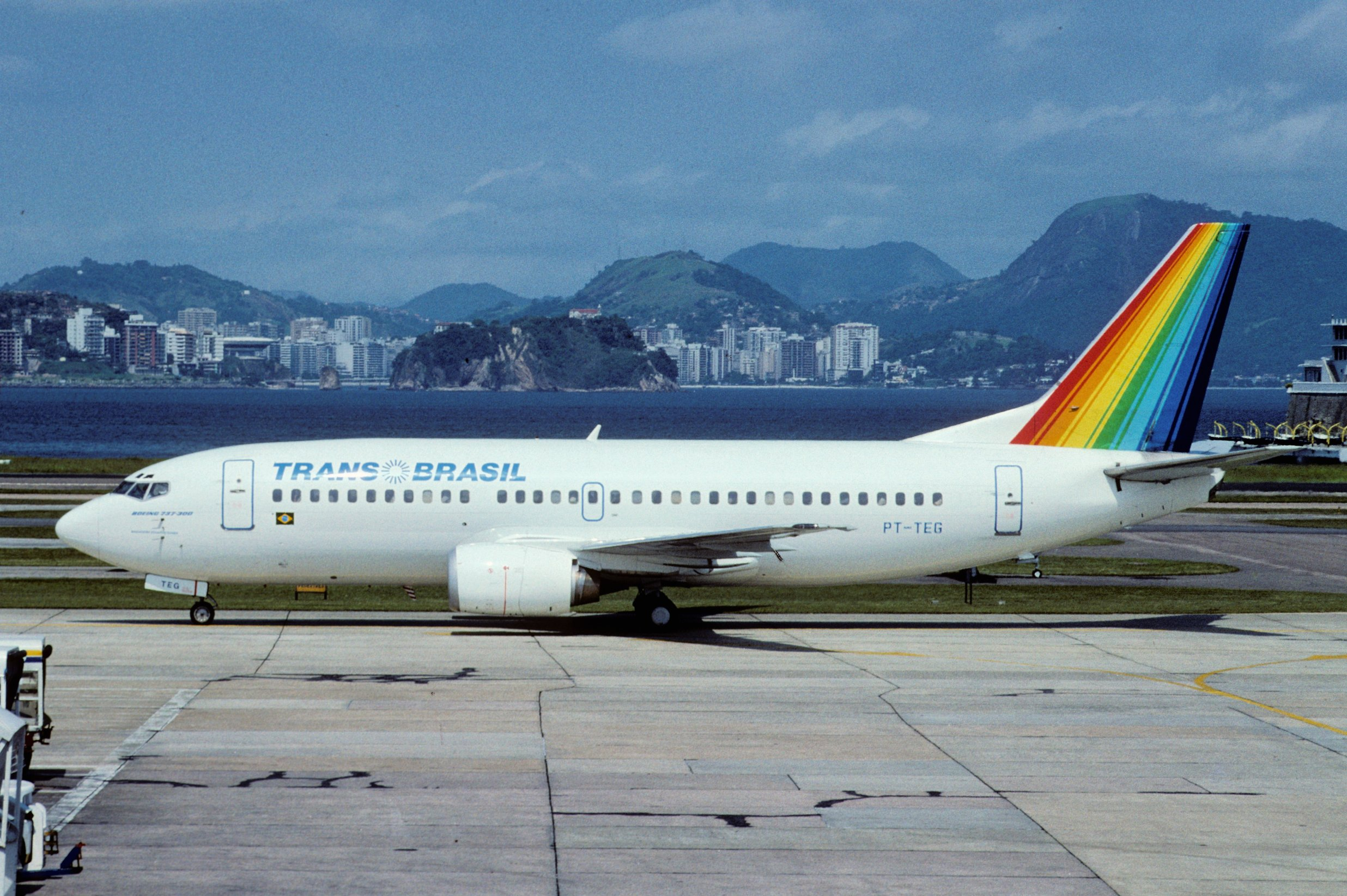
A Boeing 737-300.

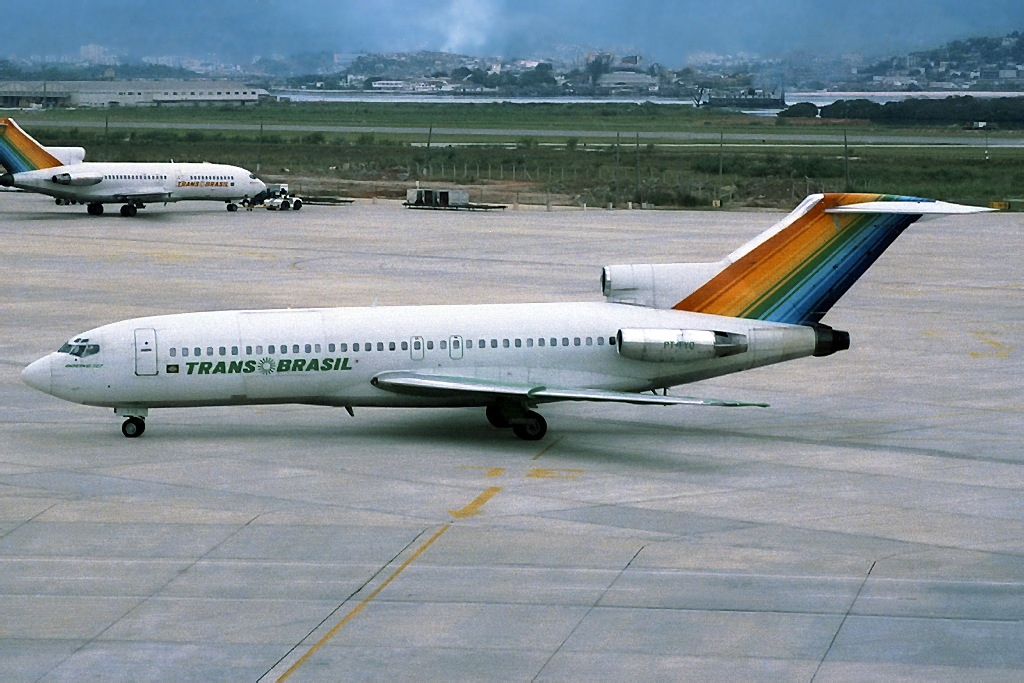
A Boeing 727-100

In 1990 Transbrasil fleet consisted of three 767-200, three Boeing 707 for cargo and passenger service (operated by its affiliated company, Aerobrasil) and 15 leased Boeing 737-300 and -400. In addition to domestic flights to most of the larger Brazilian cities, Transbrasil offered regular and charter service to Miami, Orlando, New York, Washington, Buenos Aires, Vienna, Amsterdam, London and even Beijing. During some time, due to discounted ticket prices and an aggressive commercial strategy Transbrasil surpassed VASP as the second largest Brazilian airline.

Despite its growing market share, Transbrasil was already experiencing financial problems. In 1987 after a formal request of its chairman Omar Fontana, the Brazilian government took over Transbrasil management. However, soon Fontana started to disagree with the Brazilian Air Force officers nominated to run the company and in 1989 the intervention was cancelled. After Fontana stepped out from Transbrasil management due to health issues, the company was run by his son-in-law Celso Cipriani - a former police officer with no previous experience in airline management. Cipriani's tenure on Transbrasil was controversial, and he has been formally charged with fraud, embezzlement of funds and property and mismanagement since then.

On January 14, 1994, Transbrasil created its regional subsidiary Interbrasil STAR to operate as feeder-carrier. Services started on July 3, 1995.

In addition to the management problems, Transbrasil was also facing other difficulties, specially the reduced or no profit from its international routes, severe competition from other companies in the domestic front (specially TAM, a former air taxi company with a growing fleet) and growing expenses. Following the September 11 attacks, despite several government loans, Transbrasil was amassing huge debts with several suppliers. When Shell refused to further supply fuel without payment, Transbrasil's then aging and reduced fleet was grounded on 3 December 2001. It never returned to the air, and was declared bankrupt in 2003 at the request of one of its major debtors - GE Capital Aviation Services.

=== After bankruptcy (2003–2010) ===
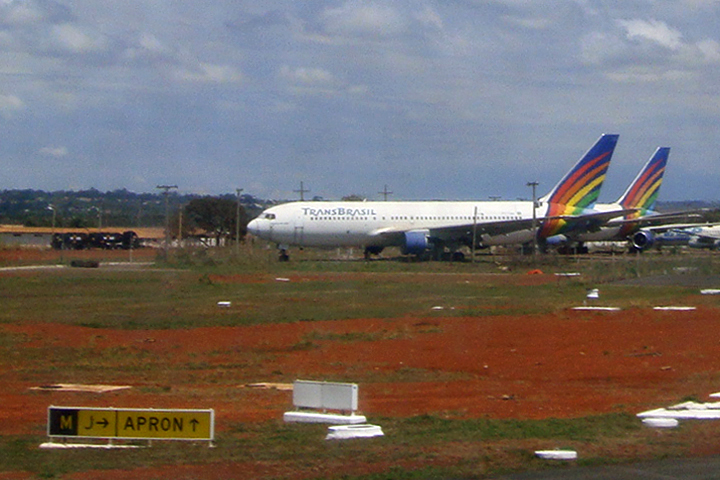
Jetliners abandoned at Brasília International Airport since 2001

On 16 September 2009 the Brazilian Federal Supreme Court began the analysis of the legality of the bankruptcy of Transbrasil. The bankruptcy was confirmed on 2 October 2009.

That same year, the Public Ministry was preparing to file charges against the senior management of the company. The main accused was Celso Cipriani, who allegedly committed crimes that hastened the company's demise.

In 2010, the debt which caused the bankruptcy of Transbrasil was invalidated by the Court of Justice of São Paulo.

On 15 February 2023, it was announced that the airframes of PT-TAA and PT-TAB would be moved away after being abandoned for 21 years at Brasília Airport. This finally happened on 17 February 2023.

== Destinations ==
Transbrasil operated scheduled services to the destinations below. The list includes destinations served by subsidiaries Interbrasil STAR, Aerobrasil and also destinations operated under the airline original name Sadia.

Country	City	Airport	Notes	Refs
Argentina	Buenos Aires	Ezeiza International Airport		
Argentina	Córdoba	Pajas Blancas International Airport		
Austria	Vienna	Schwechat Airport		
Brazil	Aracaju	Santa Maria Airport		
Brazil	Bauru	Bauru Airport		
Brazil	Belém	Val-de-Cans International Airport		
Brazil	Belmonte	Belmonte Airport		
Brazil	Belo Horizonte	Confins–Tancredo Neves International Airport		
Brazil	Belo Horizonte	Pampulha Airport		
Brazil	Brasília	Pres. Juscelino Kubitschek International Airport		
Brazil	Caçador	Caçador Airport		
Brazil	Caculé	Caculé Airport		
Brazil	Caetité	Caetité Airport		
Brazil	Campina Grande	Pres. João Suassuna Airport		
Brazil	Campinas	Viracopos International Airport		
Brazil	Caravelas	Caravelas Airport		
Brazil	Cascavel	Cascavel Airport		
Brazil	Chapecó	Chapecó Airport		
Brazil	Concórdia	Concórdia Airport		
Brazil	Criciúma/Forquilhinha	Forquilhinha/Criciúma Airport		
Brazil	Cuiabá/Várzea Grande	Mal. Rondon International Airport		
Brazil	Curitiba	Afonso Pena International Airport		
Brazil	Erechim	Erechim Airport		
Brazil	Fernando de Noronha	Fernando de Noronha Airport		
Brazil	Florianópolis	Hercílio Luz International Airport		
Brazil	Fortaleza	Pinto Martins International Airport		
Brazil	Foz do Iguaçu	Cataratas International Airport		
Brazil	Goiânia	Santa Genoveva Airport		
Brazil	Ilhéus	Ilhéus Airport		
Brazil	Joaçaba	Joaçaba Airport		
Brazil	João Pessoa	Pres. Castro Pinto International Airport		
Brazil	Joinville	Joinville Airport		
Brazil	Londrina	Londrina Airport		
Brazil	Maceió	Zumbi dos Palmares International Airport		
Brazil	Manaus	Eduardo Gomes International Airport		
Brazil	Manaus	Ponta Pelada Airport	airport closed	
Brazil	Maringá	Dr. Gastão Vidigal Airport	airport closed	
Brazil	Maringá	Sílvio Name Júnior Regional Airport		
Brazil	Nanuque	Nanuque Airport		
Brazil	Natal	Augusto Severo International Airport		
Brazil	Navegantes	Navegantes Airport		
Brazil	Poços de Caldas	Poços de Caldas Airport		
Brazil	Porto Alegre	Salgado Filho International Airport		
Brazil	Prado	Prado Airport		
Brazil	Quixadá	Quixadá Airport		
Brazil	Recife	Guararapes International Airport		
Brazil	Ribeirão Preto	Leite Lopes Airport		
Brazil	Rio de Janeiro	Galeão–Antonio Carlos Jobim International Airport		
Brazil	Rio de Janeiro	Santos Dumont Airport		
Brazil	Salinas	Salinas Airport		
Brazil	Salvador da Bahia	Dep. Luís Eduardo Magalhães International Airport		
Brazil	São José do Rio Preto	São José do Rio Preto Airport		
Brazil	São Luís	Mal. Cunha Machado International Airport		
Brazil	São Paulo	Congonhas Airport		
Brazil	São Paulo	Guarulhos–Gov. André Franco Montoro International Airport		
Brazil	Teresina	Sen. Petrônio Portella Airport		
Brazil	Uberlândia	Uberlândia Airport		
Brazil	Umuarama	Umuarama Airport		
Brazil	Videira	Videira Airport		
Brazil	Vitória	Eurico de Aguiar Salles Airport		
Canada	Montreal	Mirabel International Airport		
Chile	Santiago	Arturo Merino Benítez International Airport		
Netherlands	Amsterdam	Schiphol Airport		
Portugal	Lisbon	Portela Airport		
Portugal	Porto	Pedras Rubras Airport		
United Kingdom	London	Gatwick Airport		
United States	Miami	Miami International Airport		
United States	New York City	John F. Kennedy International Airport		
United States	Orlando	Orlando International Airport		
United States	Washington, D.C.	Dulles International Airport		

== Fleet ==
Sadia and Transbrasil fleets
Aircraft	Total	Years of operation	Notes
Douglas DC-3	12	1955–1968	
Curtiss C-46	3	1956–1967	
Handley Page Dart Herald	10	1963–1976	
BAC One-Eleven series 500	10	1971–1978	
Embraer EMB 110	6	1973–1976	
Boeing 707	10	1982–1991	
Boeing 727-100	22	1974–1989	
Boeing 737-300	13	1986–2001	
Boeing 737-400	5	1989–2001	
Boeing 767-200	9	1983–2001	
Boeing 767-300	5	1991–2001	

== Airline affinity program ==
TransPass was the Frequent-flyer program of Transbrasil. Points could be used on Transbrasil and Interbrasil STAR services. Points held at the time of the airline's collapse lost their value as no other airline took over the program.

== Accidents and incidents ==
=== As Sadia ===
- 4 August 1963: a Douglas C-49E registration PP-SLL en route from Joaçaba to Videira crashed into a hill when approaching Videira under poor visibility. All 10 occupants died.
- 3 November 1967: a Handley Page Dart Herald 214 registration PP-SDJ flying from São Paulo-Congonhas to Curitiba-Afonso Pena collided with a hill during approach to land at Curitiba. All crew and 21 passengers died, 4 passengers survived.
- 16 March 1968: Douglas C-47A-35-DL (DC-3) registration PP-AST en route from Miami to Arica Chile crashed near Tacna. All 4 occupants died.

=== As Transbrasil ===
- 22 January 1976: an Embraer EMB 110C Bandeirante registration PT-TBD operating flight 107 from Chapecó to Erechim, crashed upon take-off from Chapecó. Seven of the nine passengers and crew on board died.
- 12 April 1980: a Boeing 727-27C registration PT-TYS operating flight 303 flying from São Paulo-Congonhas to Florianópolis was on a night instrumental approach to Florianópolis Airport under a severe thunderstorm. The aircraft went off course, struck a hill and exploded. Probable causes are misjudgment of speed and distance, inadequate flight supervision, failure to initiate a go-around and improper operation of the engines. Of the 58 passengers and crew aboard, 3 passengers survived.
- 21 March 1989: Flight 801, a cargo Boeing 707-349C registration PT-TCS, flying from Manaus to São Paulo-Guarulhos, crashed at the district of Vila Barros in Guarulhos, shortly before touch-down at runway 09R. That day, at 12:00 the runway was going to be closed for maintenance and the crew decided to speed up procedures to touch-down before closure (it was already 11:54). In a hurry, one of the crew members, by mistake, activated the air-dynamic brakes and the aircraft lost too much speed to have enough aerodynamic support (Stall). As a consequence the aircraft crashed at approximately 2 km from the airport. There were 25 fatalities which of these three were crew members and 22 were civilians on the accident site. As well as the 22 fatalities, there were also over 200 injured on the ground. This aircraft was used in the filming of the movie Airport.

== See also ==
- List of defunct airlines of Brazil

== Bibliography ==
- Anderson D.A., Aviaçao comercial brasileira, Ed. Universitaria, 1979
- Davies R.E.G., Rebels and reformers of the airways, Airlife Publishing Ltd. & Smithsonian Institution Press, 1987
- Pereira A., Breve historia da aviaçao comercial brasileira, Europa Empresa Grafica e Editora, Rio de Janeiro, 1987
- Davies R.E.G., Trans Brasil-An airline and its aircraft, Paladwr Press, McLean (Virg.), 1997
- Beting G., Brazilian wings-The illustrated history of Brazilian civil aviation, Beting Books, 2005
