= Interbrasil STAR =

Brazilian regional airline (1994-2001)

InterBrasil STAR
IATA	ICAO	Call sign
Q9	ITB	INTERBRASIL
- Founded: 1994
- Commenced operations: 1995
- Ceased operations: 2001
- Frequent-flyer program: TransPass
- Destinations: 21
- Parent company: TransBrasil
- Headquarters: São Paulo, Brazil

InterBrasil STAR S/A was a Brazilian airline founded in 1994 as a feeder airline to Transbrasil. It ceased activities along with its parent company in 2001.

== History ==
Interbrasil Sistema de Transporte Aéreo Regional was founded on January 14, 1994 as a subsidiary of Transbrasil with the purpose to serve as a feeder carrier. Operations started on July 3, 1995.

In 1999 Interbrasil STAR participated with Total Linhas Aéreas in the creation of a shuttle service between Rio de Janeiro-Santos Dumont and Belo Horizonte-Pampulha using mostly the ATR-42 of Total.

On December 4, 2001, following the collapse of its parent company, Interbrasil STAR ceased operations.

== Destinations ==
Interbrasil STAR served the following cities:

City	Airport	Notes
Bauru	Bauru Airport	
Belo Horizonte	Pampulha/Carlos Drummond de Andrade Airport	
Brasília	Pres. Juscelino Kubitschek International Airport	
Campinas	Viracopos International Airport	
Cascavel	Adalberto Mendes da Silva Airport	
Chapecó	Serafin Enoss Bertaso Airport	
Curitiba	Afonso Pena International Airport	
Florianópolis	Hercílio Luz International Airport	
Foz do Iguaçu	Cataratas International Airport	
Goiânia	Santa Genoveva Airport	
Joinville	Lauro Carneiro de Loyola Airport	
Londrina	Gov. José Richa Airport	
Maringá	Sílvio Name Júnior Regional Airport	
Navegantes	Min. Victor Konder International Airport	
Porto Alegre	Salgado Filho International Airport	
Ribeirão Preto	Leite Lopes Airport	
Rio de Janeiro	Santos Dumont Airport	
São José do Rio Preto	Prof. Eribelto Manoel Reino State Airport	
São Paulo	Congonhas Airport	
São Paulo	Guarulhos/Gov. André Franco Montoro International Airport	
Uberlândia	Ten. Cel. Av. César Bombonato Airport	

== Fleet ==
Interbrasil STAR fleet
Aircraft	Total	Years of operation	Notes
Embraer EMB 120 QC/RT Brasília	8	1995–2001	

== Airline affinity program ==
Interbrasil STAR, being fully integrated into Transbrasil network accrued miles on Transbrasil’s Frequent-flyer program TransPass. Points could be used on Transbrasil and Interbrasil STAR services. Points held at the time of the airline's collapse lost their value as no other airline took over the program.

== See also ==
- List of defunct airlines of Brazil
