= Araranguá =

Araranguá, Brazil
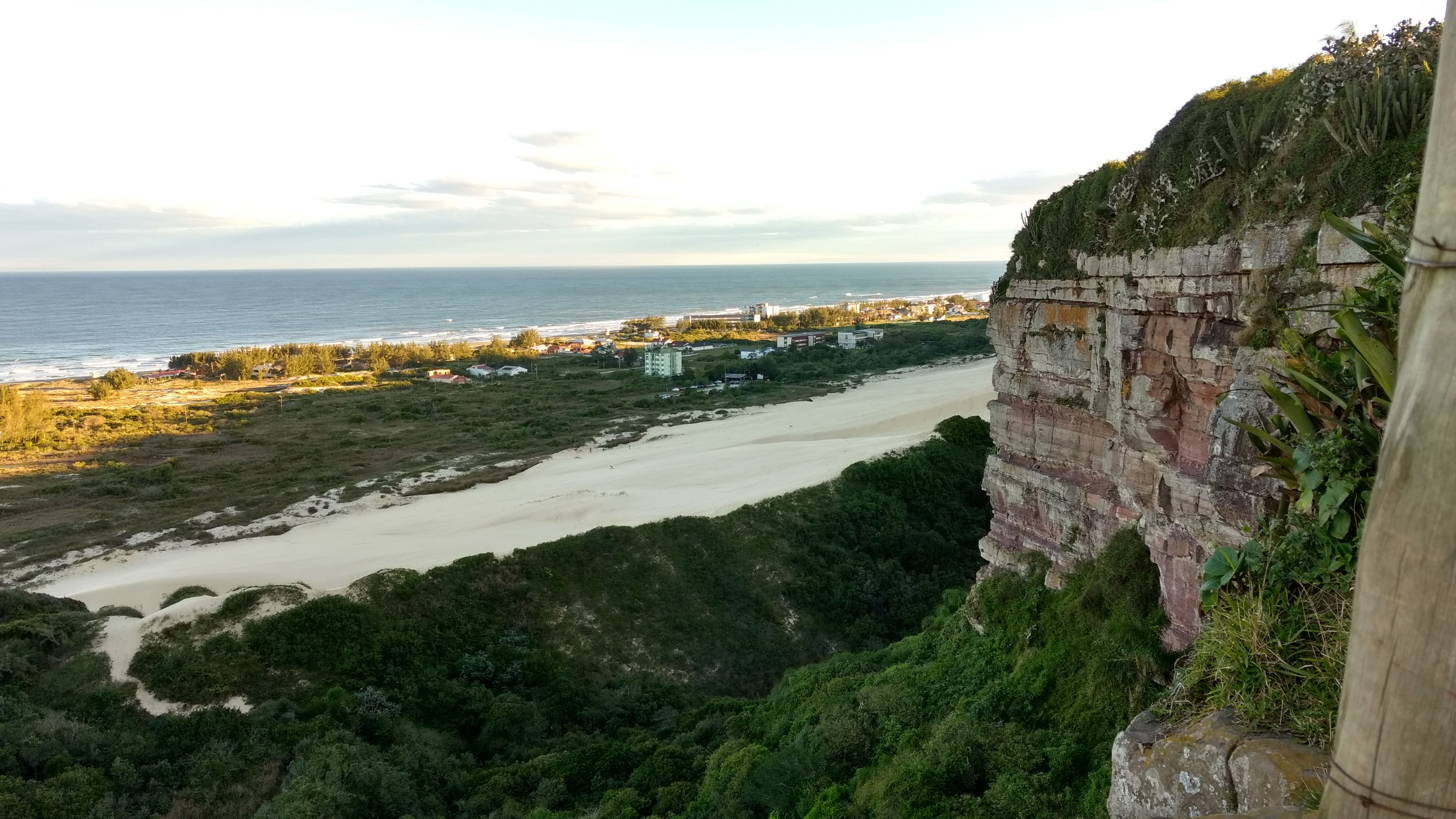
- View from Farol do Morro dos Conventos

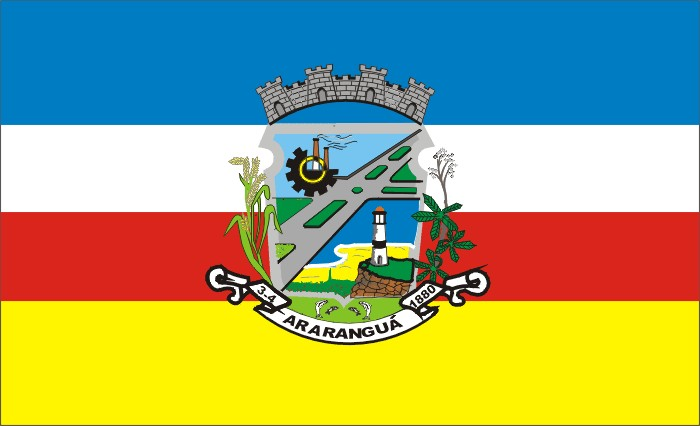
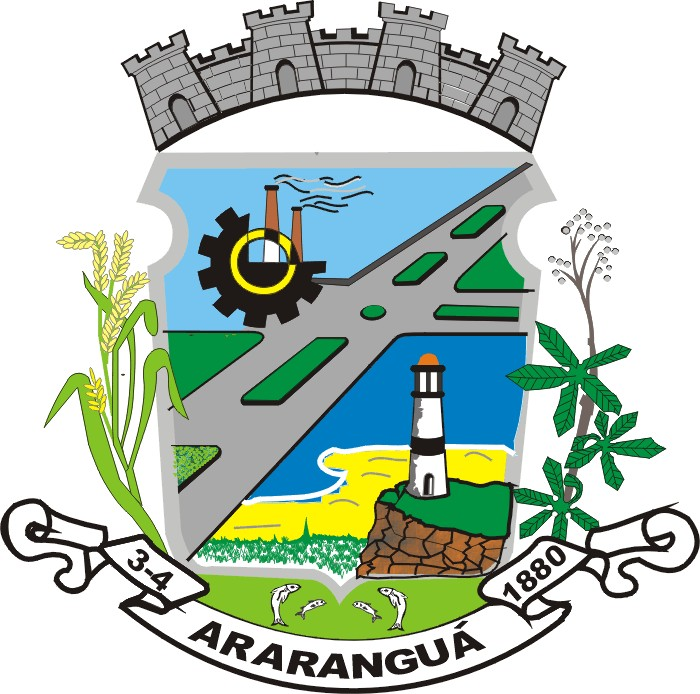
- Flag Coat of arms
- Nickname: "Cidade das Avenidas" ("City of Avenues")
- Location in Brazil

- Location within Brazil
- Coordinates: 28°56′06″S 49°29′09″W
- Country: Brazil
- Region: South
- State: (Santa Catarina (state)) Santa Catarina
- MesoRegion: MesoRegion Sul Catarinense
- Microregion: Microregion of Araranguá
- Founded: May 4, 1728

Government
  - Mayor: César Antônio Cesa (MDB, 2021 – 2024)

Area
  - Total: 303,299 km^{2} (117,104 sq mi)
- Elevation: 13 m (43 ft)

Population (2020)
  - Total: 68,867
  - Density: 0.22706/km^{2} (0.58808/sq mi)
  - Ethnic Groups: Portuguese and Italian
- Time zone: UTC−3 (BRT)
- HDI (2000): 0.814 – high
- Climate Type: Temperate
- Average Temp: 20 °C (68 °F)
- Website: City’s official website

Araranguá is a city located in the southern part of Santa Catarina state, in the south of Brazil. It has 68,867 inhabitants and was settled mainly by Portuguese and Italians. Araranguá is known as "A Cidade das Avenidas" ("The City of the Avenues") because of its wide roads.

== History ==
Until the 18th century, the city was inhabited mostly by Carijós and Kaingang Indians. These ethnics groups disappeared after the arrival of the first Europeans settlers.

On 11 February 1728, was started the opening of the Caminho dos Conventos way that linked Morro dos Conventos ("Convents Mountain") to Curitiba. This way became used mostly by the tropeiros, who carried cattle from Rio Grande do Sul to São Paulo. Araranguá became a waypoint for those between Viamão (former capital of Rio Grande do Sul) and Lages (in the top of the Planalto Serrano).

The first to arrive in Araranguá region were the Portugueses, who came from Laguna in the beginning of the 19th century. They first settled in the Morro dos Conventos. Later, Italian, German, Polish and Spanish immigrants and the African slaves arrived in the city. In 1816 was inaugurated in the village of Canjicas the first chapel in the region. In 1864 was created the first church within the current city of Araranguá.

The city was founded 3 April 1880, and was named Araranguá after the Araranguá River. The village was promoted to the condition of city in 1921.

Along the 20th century the city underwent some dismemberments. The city of Criciúma emancipated in 1925 followed by Turvo (1948), Sombrio (1953), Maracajá (1967) and Balneário Arroio do Silva (1997).

== Climate ==
Araranguá was struck by the Cyclone Catarina in the night between 28 and 29 March 2004 with winds up to 150 km/h. This event still intrigues scientists.

The city was again struck by at least two tornadoes in the night of September, the 29th of 2009, the first ever recorded in the urban area, although others have been already spotted in rural areas. A school gymnasium collapsed over a house and many windows were broken in some shops, but there were no victims.

Climate data for Araranguá (1976–2005)
Month	Jan	Feb	Mar	Apr	May	Jun	Jul	Aug	Sep	Oct	Nov	Dec	Year
Record high °C (°F)	37.0 (98.6)	34.8 (94.6)	34.0 (93.2)	32.6 (90.7)	34.4 (93.9)	32.8 (91.0)	32.9 (91.2)	36.4 (97.5)	37.2 (99.0)	32.8 (91.0)	36.4 (97.5)	38.0 (100.4)	38.0 (100.4)
Mean daily maximum °C (°F)	28.6 (83.5)	28.2 (82.8)	27.6 (81.7)	26.0 (78.8)	23.7 (74.7)	21.0 (69.8)	20.8 (69.4)	21.6 (70.9)	22.0 (71.6)	23.4 (74.1)	26.0 (78.8)	29.2 (84.6)	24.8 (76.7)
Daily mean °C (°F)	24.5 (76.1)	23.9 (75.0)	22.2 (72.0)	20.0 (68.0)	16.7 (62.1)	14.2 (57.6)	14.8 (58.6)	15.9 (60.6)	16.9 (62.4)	19.1 (66.4)	21.5 (70.7)	23.8 (74.8)	19.5 (67.0)
Mean daily minimum °C (°F)	20.8 (69.4)	20.5 (68.9)	18.1 (64.6)	14.9 (58.8)	11.2 (52.2)	9.4 (48.9)	10.5 (50.9)	11.2 (52.2)	12.3 (54.1)	15.2 (59.4)	17.7 (63.9)	19.0 (66.2)	15.1 (59.1)
Record low °C (°F)	15.0 (59.0)	13.4 (56.1)	8.0 (46.4)	4.6 (40.3)	1.0 (33.8)	4.0 (39.2)	1.6 (34.9)	1.8 (35.2)	2.4 (36.3)	10.0 (50.0)	12.0 (53.6)	11.0 (51.8)	1.0 (33.8)
Average precipitation mm (inches)	119.1 (4.69)	114.9 (4.52)	148.9 (5.86)	78.2 (3.08)	48.7 (1.92)	72.8 (2.87)	66.8 (2.63)	113.9 (4.48)	161.6 (6.36)	108.1 (4.26)	82.4 (3.24)	67.0 (2.64)	1,182.4 (46.55)
Average relative humidity (%)	83	85	81	78	80	82	85	84	80	80	78	78	81
Mean monthly sunshine hours	151	111	180	160	153	135	119	125	107	126	167	206	1,740
Source: Empresa Brasileira de Pesquisa Agropecuária (EMBRAPA)

== Economy ==
- Agriculture – production of rice, beans, tobacco and corn.
- Industry – based on metallurgy, ceramics, furniture and textiles.
- Commerce
- Tourism

== Education ==
The city has a campus of the Federal University of Santa Catarina, inaugurated on 10 August 2009. With headquarters in Mato Alto and Jardim das Avenidas, the campus offers 4 undergraduate programs (Computer Engineering, Energy Engineering, Physiotherapy and Information and Communication Technologies) and 4 masters programs (Rehabilitation Sciences, Energy and Sustainability, Physics Teaching and Information and Communication Technologies).

Also located in Araranguá is a campus of the Federal Institute of Santa Catarina, which offers technical courses in Electromechanics, Fashion and Apparel Production, and undergraduate programs in Fashion Design and Physics .

== Notable people ==
- Ramon Abatti – FIFA football referee
- Mel Fronckowiak – Brazilian actress, writer, and TV host
- Juliano (Juliano Gomes Soares) – Brazilian football player

== Transportation ==
=== Highways ===
Araranguá is accessed by road mainly from the BR-101, an important highway that connects several major Brazilian cities. It lies roughly halfway between Porto Alegre and Florianópolis, the former being 210 km (130 mi) away.

=== Buses ===
The city is served by Viação Cidade for intra-city routes and by União, Pluma, SantoAnjo and Eucatur for inter-city and inter-state routes. Among cities served are Porto Alegre, Florianópolis, Curitiba and São Paulo besides most of the neighboring cities and cities along those routes.

== See also ==
List of municipalities in Santa Catarina
