= Flight 303 =

Flight 303 may refer to:

Listed chronologically

- Lufthansa Flight 303, hijacked on 17 December 1973
- Transbrasil Flight 303, crashed on 12 April 1980
