= ITB =

ITB or variant, may refer to:

== Travel, transportation, vehicles ==
- "Improved Touring B", a racing class in the race car series Improved Touring
- Integrated tug-barge, a type of tugboat and ocean-going barge
- Individual throttle body, a carburetor part
- ITB Berlin, a travel industry trade show
- Itaituba Airport (IATA airport code: ITB)
- Interbrasil STAR (ICAO airline code: ITB)
- Întreprinderea de Transport București, former name of Societatea de Transport București

== Organizations ==
- Inside the Box Board Games, a UK game publisher

=== Government organs ===
- Innovation and Technology Bureau, Hong Kong
- FBI Information and Technology Branch, USA

==== Military units ====
- Infantry Training Brigade, of the United States Army Infantry School
- Infantry Training Battalion, of the United States Marine Corps School of Infantry
- Infantry Training Battalion, of the Infantry Training Centre (British Army)

=== Educational institutions ===
- Institut Teknologi Bandung, Indonesian name of Bandung Institute of Technology
- Institut Teknologi Brunei, now Universiti Teknologi Brunei
- Institute of Technology, Blanchardstown, Ireland
- Industry Training Board, a historic type of vocational training organization in the UK

== Medicine and biology ==
- Iliotibial band, a tissue in the human leg

== Other uses ==
- ITB: Invitation to Bid
- itb, an ISO 639 language code for the Itneg language
- ITB, the intermediate block check character in the IBM communications protocol Binary Synchronous Communications
- Instruction translation buffer, a type of cache used in Alpha 21064 microprocessors

== See also ==
- ITBS (disambiguation)
