= Serviços Aéreos Cruzeiro do Sul Flight 412 =

1958 aviation accident in Brazil

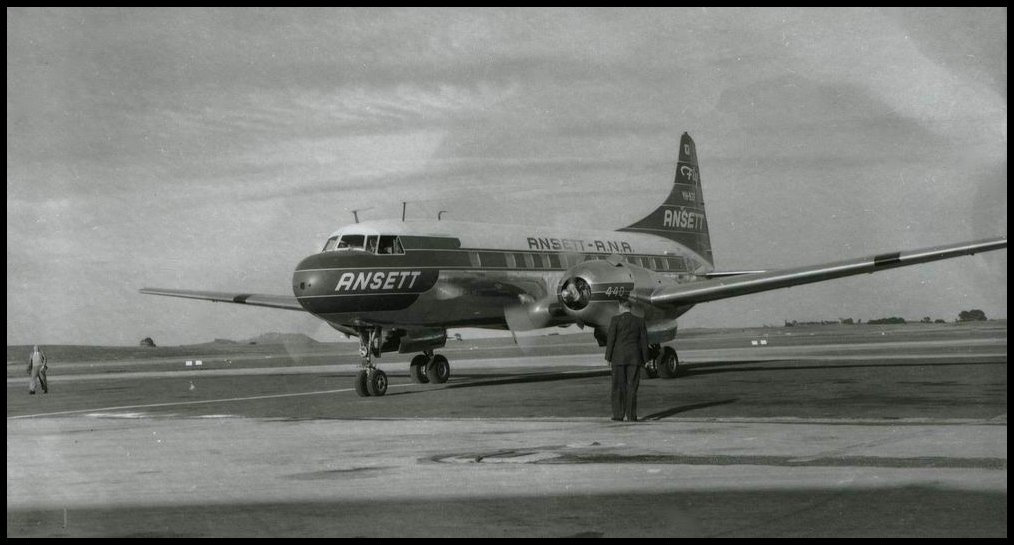
- A Convair CV-440 similar to the one involved

Accident
- Date: June 16, 1958
- Summary: Entered downdraft during approach
- Site: near Afonso Pena International Airport, São José dos Pinhais, Paraná, Brazil

Aircraft
- Aircraft type: Convair CV-440
- Operator: Serviços Aéreos Cruzeiro do Sul
- Registration: PP-CEP
- Flight origin: Salgado Filho Porto Alegre International Airport, Porto Alegre, Rio Grande do Sul, Brazil
- 1st stopover: Hercílio Luz International Airport, Floripa, Santa Catarina, Brazil
- 2nd stopover: Afonso Pena International Airport, São José dos Pinhais, Paraná, Brazil
- Last stopover: São Paulo/Guarulhos International Airport, São Paulo, Brazil
- Destination: Santos Dumont Airport, Rio de Janeiro, Brazil
- Occupants: 26
- Passengers: 21
- Crew: 5
- Fatalities: 21
- Injuries: 5
- Survivors: 5

Serviços Aéreos Cruzeiro do Sul Flight 412 was a domestic passenger flight from Porto Alegre to Rio de Janeiro with stopovers in Florianópolis, São José dos Pinhais and São Paulo respectively. On 16 June 1958, the Convair CV-440 operating the flight entered an area of rain accompanied by strong winds and crashed into the ground in the Colônia Murici settlement of São José dos Pinhais, a few kilometers from the airport.

Among the victims were former president Nereu Ramos, the governor of Santa Catarina Jorge Lacerda, federal deputy Leoberto Leal and founder of the Medianeira College and Jesuit Oswaldo Gomes.

== Accident ==
The vicinity of Afonso Pena Airport was experiencing heavy rains. By radio, the pilot requested permission to land, but the tower requested that the aircraft waited for another plane to take off.

As visibility continued to deteriorate, the aircraft was caught in a storm during an approach maneuver and ended up crashing in the locality of Capão do Serrado, in Colônia Murici, about 8 km from the airport. The location where the plane crashed was difficult to access and, despite the adverse conditions, two survivors managed to walk for a few kilometers until they found a local resident who provided assistance.

== Investigation ==
According to the report, the aircraft was flying in adverse weather conditions, in which downdrafts affected the rate of descent, causing it to lose altitude and collide with the ground. This fact can be corroborated by accounts from people who witnessed the tragedy, such as farmer Leonardo Valenga, who participated in the rescue efforts.

== Aftermath ==
In Colônia Murici, the accident is remembered by older people who witnessed and helped with the rescue efforts, and the site has frequently been visited by explorers with metal detectors, who have even found a coin from that time, a spoon and pieces of the plane's fuselage.
