= Jaguaruna Regional Airport =

Airport in Santa Catarina, Brazil

Humberto Ghizzo Bortoluzzi Southern Regional Airport Aeroporto Regional Sul Humberto Ghizzo Bortoluzzi
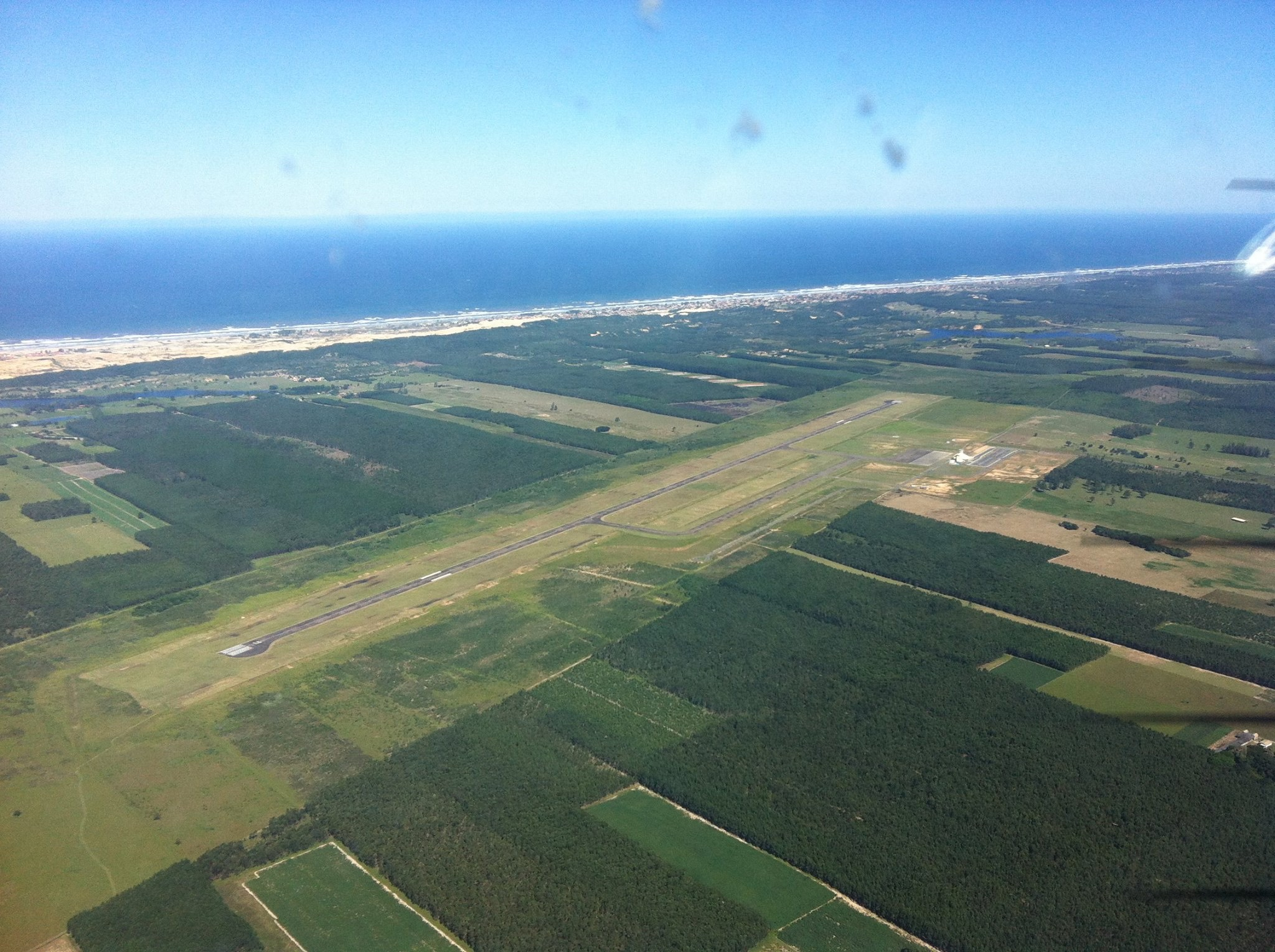
- IATA: JJG; ICAO: SBJA; LID: SC0005

Summary
- Airport type: Public
- Operator: RDL Aeroportos
- Serves: Jaguaruna, Criciúma
- Opened: 27 April 2015
- Time zone: BRT (UTC−03:00)
- Elevation AMSL: 35 m (115 ft)
- Coordinates: 28°40′31″S 49°03′37″W
- Website: www.rdlaeroportos.com.br

Map
- Location in Brazil

Runways
Direction	Length		Surface
Direction	m	ft	Surface
05/23	2,499	8,199	Asphalt
- Sources: ANAC, DECEA

Humberto Ghizzo Bortoluzzi Southern Regional Airport (IATA: JJG, ICAO: SBJA), also known as Jaguaruna Regional Airport, serves the cities of Jaguaruna, Criciúma and the southern region of Santa Catarina, Brazil.

The airport is operated by RDL Aeroportos.

== History ==
The airport was commissioned on 27 April 2015.

On 28 November 2024, RDL Aeroportos won a 30-year concession to operate the airport.

== Airlines and destinations ==
Airlines	Destinations
Azul Conecta	Florianópolis, Joinville
LATAM Brasil	São Paulo–Guarulhos

== Access ==
The airport is located 16 km (10 mi) from Jaguaruna downtown, 29 km (18 mi) from Tubarão downtown and 33 km (21 mi) from Criciúma downtown.

== See also ==
- List of airports in Brazil
