= Transportes Aéreos Salvador =

Brazilian airline

TAS – Transportes Aéreos Salvador
- Founded: 1949
- Commenced operations: 1950
- Ceased operations: 1962
- Key people: Carlos Parreiras Horta

TAS – Transportes Aéreos Salvador Ltda. was a Brazilian airline founded in 1949. In 1962 it was sold and incorporated to Sadia Transportes Aéreos.

== History ==
TAS was founded in 1949 as a non-scheduled carrier and flights started in 1950. In 1952 it was authorized to operate regular flights.

In 1955 Panair do Brasil tried to purchase the airline in order to increase its presence in Bahia but the transaction was not successful. Shortly after TAS changed its judicial status to S.A. (corporation) and the acronym was changed to TASSA. In September 1955 Transportes Aéreos Nacional became the controller of the airline.

In 1962 TASSA was sold to Sadia Transportes Aéreos and incorporated by this airline.

== Destinations ==
TAS served locations within Bahia.

== Fleet ==
TAS fleet
| Aircraft | Total | Years of operation | Notes |
|---|---|---|---|
| Beechcraft Bonanza A.35 | 5 | 1950–1962 | |
| de Havilland DH 114 Heron | 1 | 1952–1955 | |
| Beechcraft Model 18 AT-11 | 1 | 1955 | |
| Douglas DC-3/C-47 | 3 | 1955–1962 | |
| Curtiss C-46A | 6 | 1955–1962 | |

== See also ==
- List of defunct airlines of Brazil
