= Videira Airport =

Ângelo Ponzoni Municipal Airport Aeroporto Municipal Ângelo Ponzoni
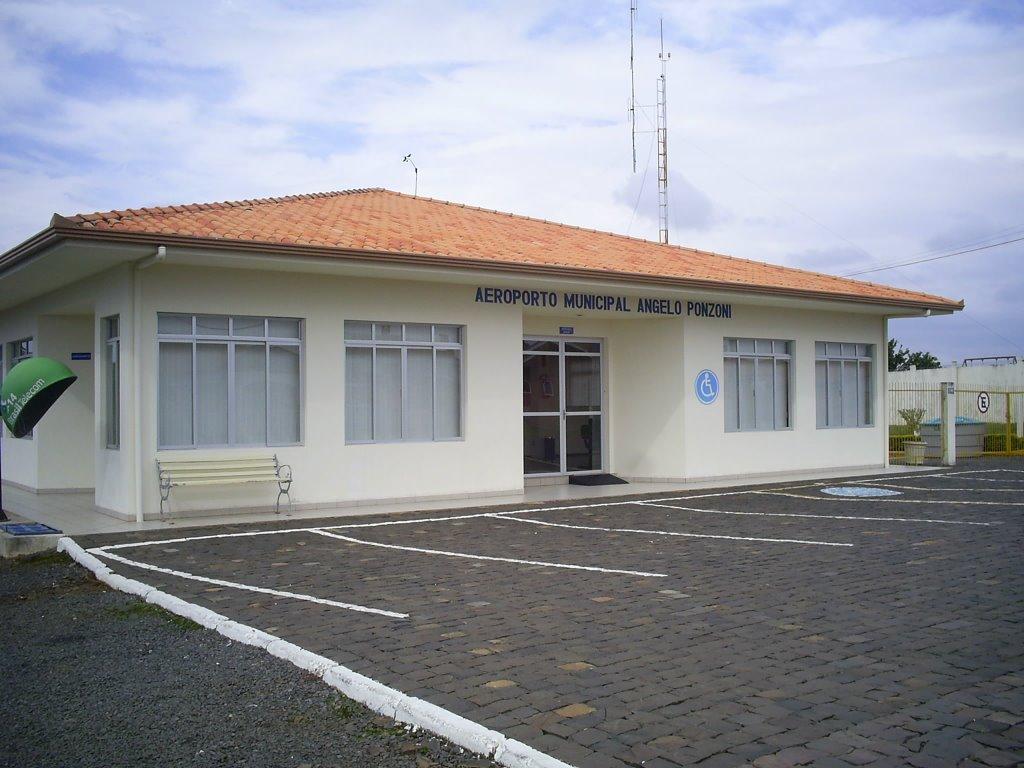
- IATA: VIA; ICAO: SSVI; LID: SC0011

Summary
- Airport type: Public
- Operator: Videira
- Serves: Videira
- Opened: November 15, 1949
- Time zone: BRT (UTC−03:00)
- Elevation AMSL: 843 m (2,766 ft)
- Coordinates: 26°59′59″S 051°08′29″W

Map
- Location in Brazil

Runways
Direction	Length		Surface
Direction	m	ft	Surface
10/28	1,400	4,593	Asphalt
- Sources: ANAC, DECEA

Ângelo Ponzoni Municipal Airport (IATA: VIA, ICAO: SSVI) is the airport serving Videira, Brazil.

It is operated by the Municipality of Videira.

== History ==
The airport was inaugurated on November 15, 1949.

== Accidents and incidents ==
- 4 August 1963: a Sadia Douglas C-49E registration PP-SLL en route from Joaçaba to Videira crashed into a hill when approaching Videira under poor visibility. All 10 occupants died.

== Access ==
The airport is located 1 km (1 mi) from downtown Videira.

== See also ==
- List of airports in Brazil
