= Jaguaruna =

Municipality in Santa Catarina, Brazil

Coordinates: 28.615°S 49.0256°W

- Municipality
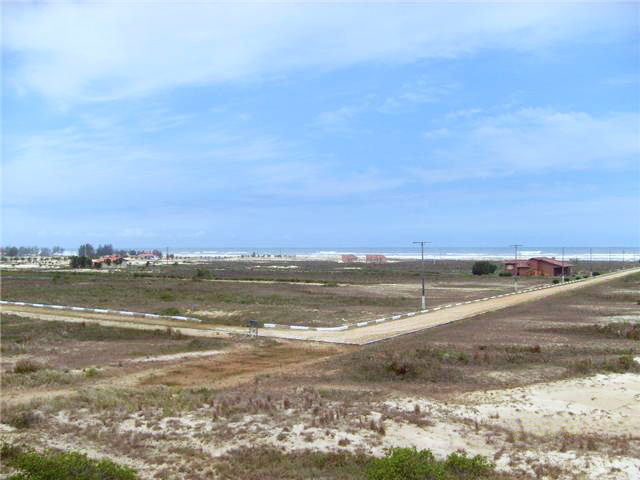

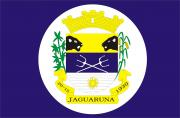
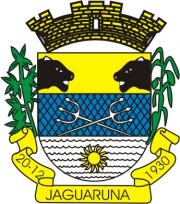
- Flag Coat of arms
- Nickname: City of the Beaches
- Interactive map of Jaguaruna
- Country: Brazil
- Region: South
- State: Santa Catarina
- Mesoregion: Sul Catarinense

Population (2020)
  - Total: 20,288
- Time zone: UTC -3

Jaguaruna is a municipality in the state of Santa Catarina in the South region of Brazil.

The city is served by Humberto Ghizzo Bortoluzzi Regional Airport.

== See also ==
- List of municipalities in Santa Catarina
