= ITBS =

ITBS may stand for:

- Iliotibial band syndrome – a common knee injury generally associated with running
- Iowa Tests of Basic Skills – a set of standardized tests given annually to school students in the United States

== See also ==
- ITB (disambiguation)
