= Juliano (footballer, born 1983) =

Brazilian footballer

Personal information
- Full name: Juliano Gomes Soares
- Date of birth: June 6, 1983 (age 43)
- Place of birth: Araranguá, Brazil
- Height: 1.75 m (5 ft 9 in)
- Position: Attacking midfielder

Team information
- Current team: Atlético Catalano

Youth career
- 2000–2003: Rio Branco-SP

Senior career*
Years	Team	Apps	(Gls)
2004	Rio Branco-SP		
2004	Sertãozinho		
2005	Aparecidense-GO		
2005–2007	Goiás	27	(2)
2007	→ Santo André (Loan)		
2007	→ Paulista (Loan)		
2008	→ Gama		
2009	→ Vila Nova (loan)		
2010	→ Trindade (loan)	6	(0)
2010	Anápolis		
2011–	Atlético Catalano		
- * Club domestic league appearances and goals

Juliano Gomes Soares (born June 6, 1983 in Araranguá), or simply Juliano, is a Brazilian attacking midfielder. He currently plays for Atlético Catalano.

== Honours ==
- Goiás State League: 2006

== Contract ==
- Paulista (Loan) 21 January 2009 to 30 November 2009
- Goiás 29 June 2005 to 27 June 2010
