= Transbrasil Flight 303 =

1980 passenger plane crash in Florianópolis, Brazil

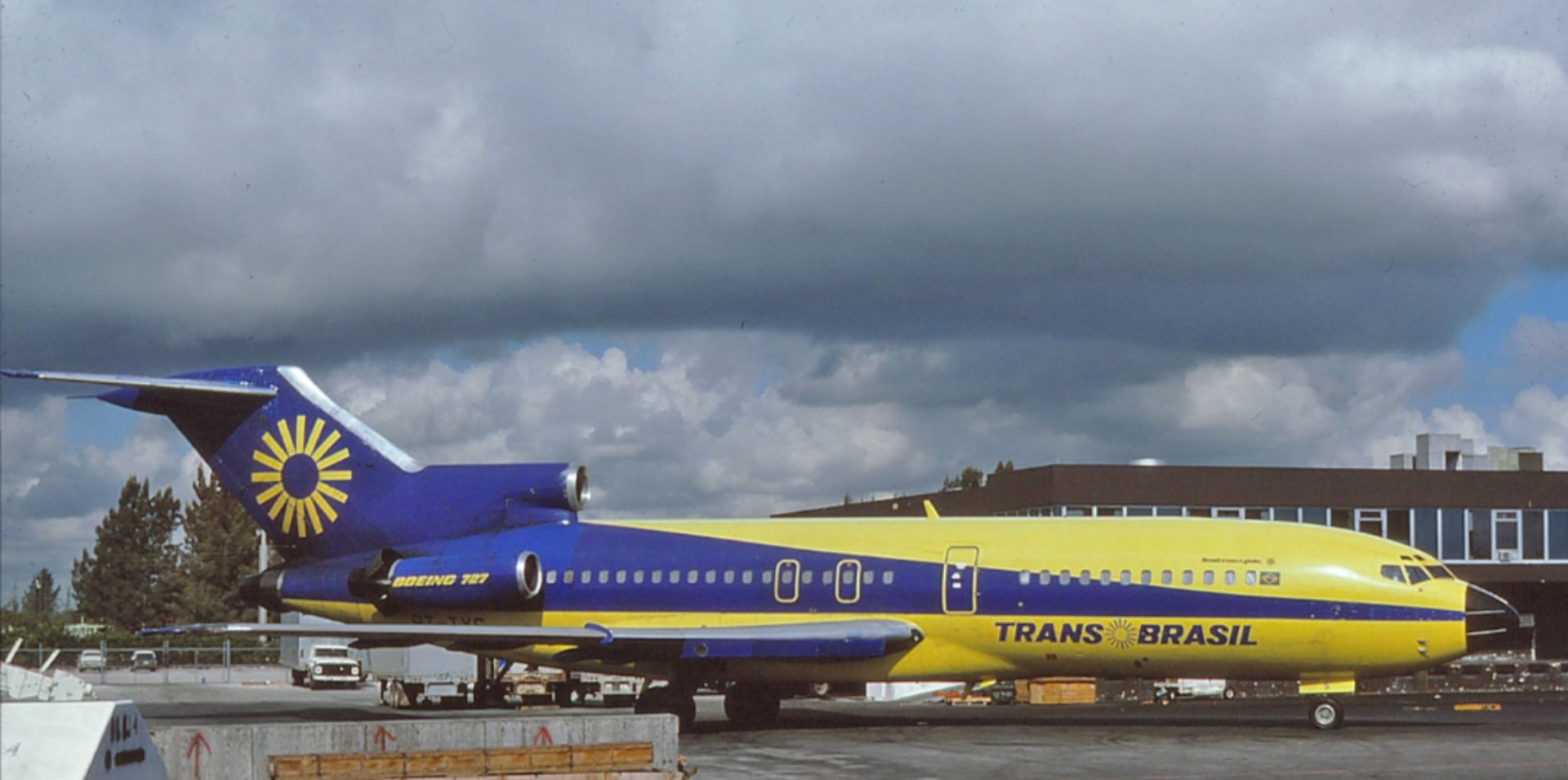
- PT-TYS, the aircraft involved in the accident, pictured in 1979 in the previous "kinetic energy" livery

Accident
- Date: 12 April 1980
- Summary: Pilot error followed by controlled flight into terrain
- Site: Morro da Virgínia, near Hercílio Luz International Airport, Florianópolis, Brazil; 27°29′35″S 48°26′46″W

Aircraft
- Aircraft type: Boeing 727-27C
- Operator: Transbrasil
- IATA flight No.: TR303
- ICAO flight No.: TBA303
- Call sign: TRANSBRASIL 303
- Registration: PT-TYS
- Flight origin: Belém/Val-de-Cans International Airport, Belém
- 1st stopover: Fortaleza Airport, Fortaleza
- 2nd stopover: Brasília International Airport, Brasília
- 3rd stopover: Goiabeiras Airport, Vitória
- 4th stopover: Rio de Janeiro/Galeão International Airport, Rio de Janeiro
- 5th stopover: Afonso Pena International Airport, Curitiba
- 6th stopover: São Paulo–Congonhas Airport, São Paulo
- Last stopover: Hercílio Luz International Airport, Florianópolis
- Destination: Salgado Filho Porto Alegre International Airport, Porto Alegre
- Occupants: 58
- Passengers: 50
- Crew: 8
- Fatalities: 55
- Injuries: 3
- Survivors: 3

Transbrasil Flight 303 was a scheduled flight from Congonhas-São Paulo Airport in São Paulo, Brazil, to Hercílio Luz International Airport in Florianópolis, Brazil, on 12 April 1980. The Boeing 727-27C crashed on approach to Hercílio Luz International Airport. Only 3 of the 58 people on board survived.

== Aircraft ==
The aircraft involved was a Boeing 727-27C, registered as PT-TYS. It first flew on 14 August 1966 and was delivered to Braniff Airways, which leased it to Transbrasil in 1975, and sold it to Transbrasil in 1976. At the time, the aircraft wore Transbrasil's new rainbow tail livery.

== Accident ==
Beginning on the morning of 12 April, the flight was scheduled to fly from Belém to Porto Alegre, with stops in Fortaleza, Brasília, Vitória, Rio de Janeiro, São Paulo, Curitiba and Florianópolis. After taking off from Belém and performing most of its stopovers, Flight 303 took off from Congonhas Airport in the early evening bound for Florianopolis, the last stopover before the final destination of the flight, Porto Alegre.

The aircraft was on a night instrument approach to Hercílio Luz International Airport in a severe thunderstorm. After reaching Florianópolis' non-directional beacon (NDB), located near the Hercílio Luz bridge, the Boeing 727 descended from 3,000 to 2,000 feet (910 to 610 m) and began its landing approach. Around 20:38, the aircraft went off course, struck the north side of the hill Morro da Virgínia, and exploded. The accident site was in the neighborhood of Ratones, about 24 kilometres (15 mi; 13 nmi) north of Florianópolis Airport. The heavy impact of the aircraft with the existing trees in the area caused the fuselage to be completely destroyed, throwing some of the passengers out, including a few survivors.

The accident site was difficult to reach. The rescue teams only reached the site at around 10 pm, an hour and a half after the accident. As one team rescued four survivors, another opened a clearing in the woods to allow a helicopter to land. During the night, the four survivors were removed by helicopter to hospitals in Florianópolis while the bodies of the passengers and dead crew were gathered to be transported to the Instituto Médico Legal. On the morning of 13 April, authorities had to block hundreds of people attempting to invade the accident site. Some time later, one of the survivors died, reducing the number of survivors to three.

== Investigation ==
The Cockpit Voice Recorder (CVR) and Flight Data Recorder (FDR) were found and recovered on 14 April. The analysis of the recorders did not indicate an abnormality in the aircraft.

Probable causes were misjudgment of speed and distance, inadequate flight supervision, failure to initiate a go-around, and improper operation of the engines.

The aircraft was piloted by an inspector from the Civil Aviation Department, who was training for the Boeing 727's supervisory role. The training was overseen by the commander of the aircraft. The bad weather caused delay in the flight and the incidence of lightning hampered the operation of the NDB of Florianópolis, generating a false block of position, which impaired the judgment of the crew. The crew's overconfidence of their geographic position prevented the approach being done from being aborted. When approaching the landing in an incorrect location (caused by the false NDB readings), the aircraft flew below the safety limit of that region, about 60 metres (200 ft) high, and collided with Morro da Virgínia, hitting the trees until it reached the north side of the hill.

The lack of modern navigational aids at the Florianopolis airport also contributed to the accident, since unlike the major airports of the time using the VOR and ILS / DME systems, Florianópolis airport used the obsolete NDB as the only aid to navigation.

== Aftermath ==
After the accident, the Brazilian Air Force accelerated the implementation of CINDACTA II in November 1982, while Infraero implemented, between July 1981 and April 1982, a new navigation aid system at the Hercílio Luz airport, consisting of radar, ILS/DME, and VOR while the obsolete NDB equipment was disabled.

Transbrasil was experiencing a serious financial crisis since 1975, being aggravated by the accident and by incidents, threats of strikes, layoffs, etc. In order not to fail (in mid-1987, Transbrasil had a debt of about US$120 million), the airline accepted to receive large financial contributions from the Brazilian government that came to intervene in the direction of the company between 1988 and 1989. After poor management, Transbrasil ceased operations in 2001, leaving a debt of about R$1.5 billion.

== Bibliography ==
- César, Carlos Ari; da Silva, Germano (2008). O rastro da bruxa: história da aviação comercial brasileira no século XX através dos seus acidentes 1928–1996 [The witch trail: history of Brazilian commercial aviation in the 20th century through its accidents 1928-1996] (in Portuguese) (2 ed.). Porto Alegre: EDIPUCRS. pp. 313–317. ISBN 978-85-7430-760-2.
