= Federal Institute of Santa Catarina =

Academic institution in Santa Catarina, Brazil

- Type: Public university, Vocational school
- Rector: Maurício Gariba Júnior
- Location: Santa Catarina, Santa Catarina, Brazil
- Campus: Urban
- Website: ifsc.edu.br

The Federal Institute of Santa Catarina (Portuguese: Instituto Federal de Santa Catarina, IFSC) is an institution of higher, vocational, and middle education located in the state of Santa Catarina, Brazil. IFSC awards undergraduate and graduate degrees, as well as professional and technical education in different areas of knowledge: life sciences, humanities, social sciences, formal sciences, physical sciences, and applied sciences. The Institute, which has several different campuses across the state of Santa Catarina, is a federally funded institution, directly affiliated to the Ministry of Education. Its main campus is in Florianópolis.

As of 2010, IFSC had over 8,000 students, 535 faculty members, and over 500 staff members. For five years in a row (2008 to 2012) and again in 2022, it has been considered the best center of technological education in Brazil by the Ministry of Education.
