= Joaçaba =

City in Santa Catarina, Brazil

Joaçaba, Santa Catarina
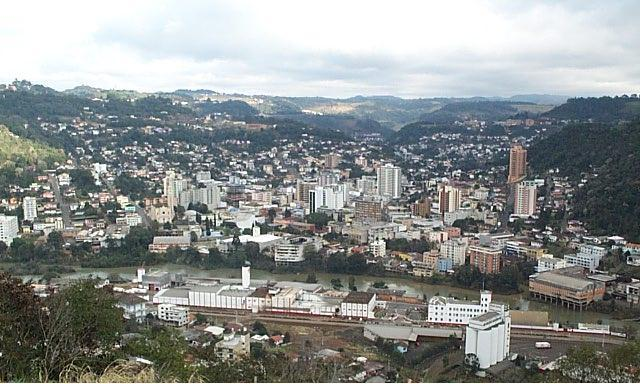
- Joaçaba, general view

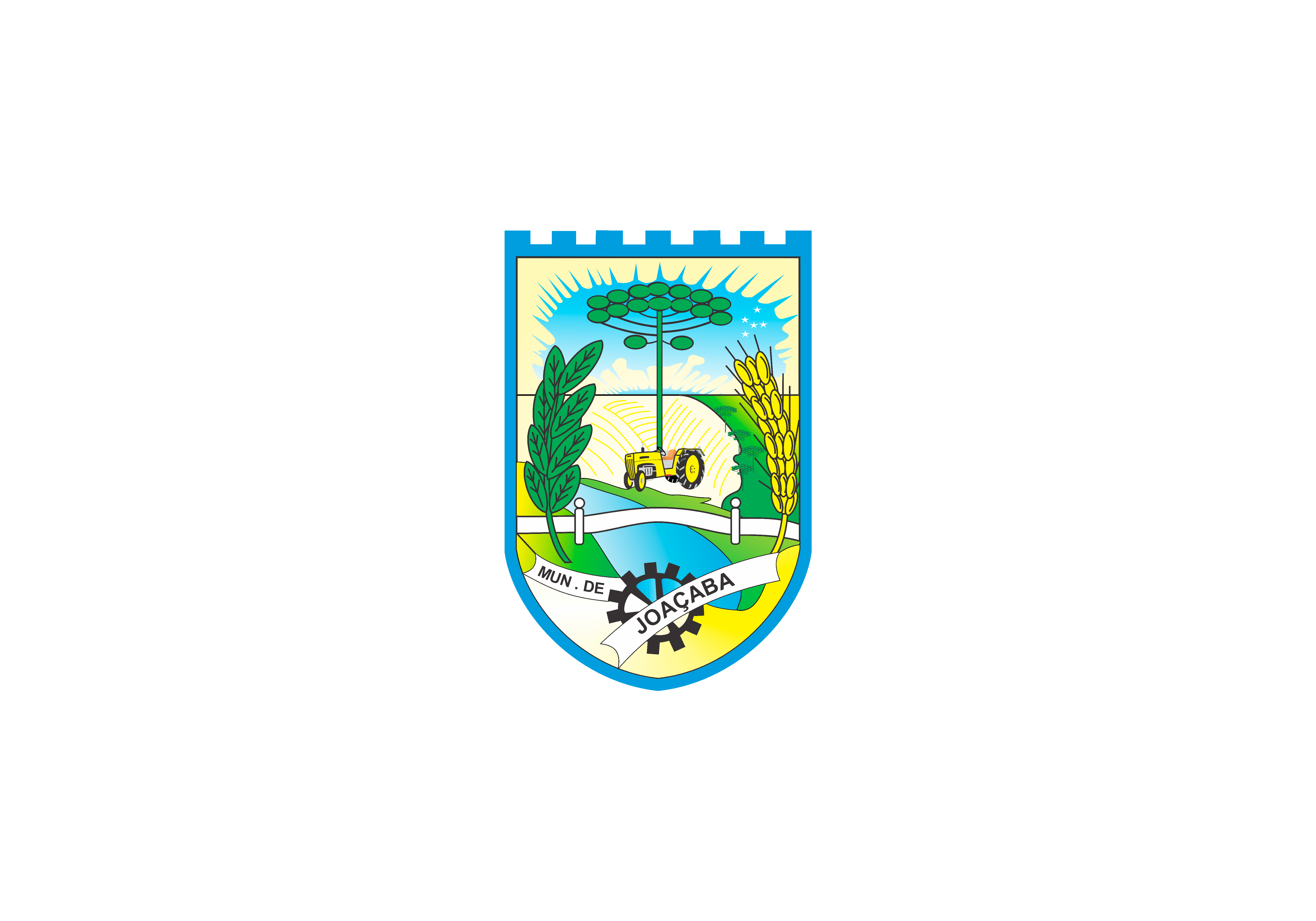
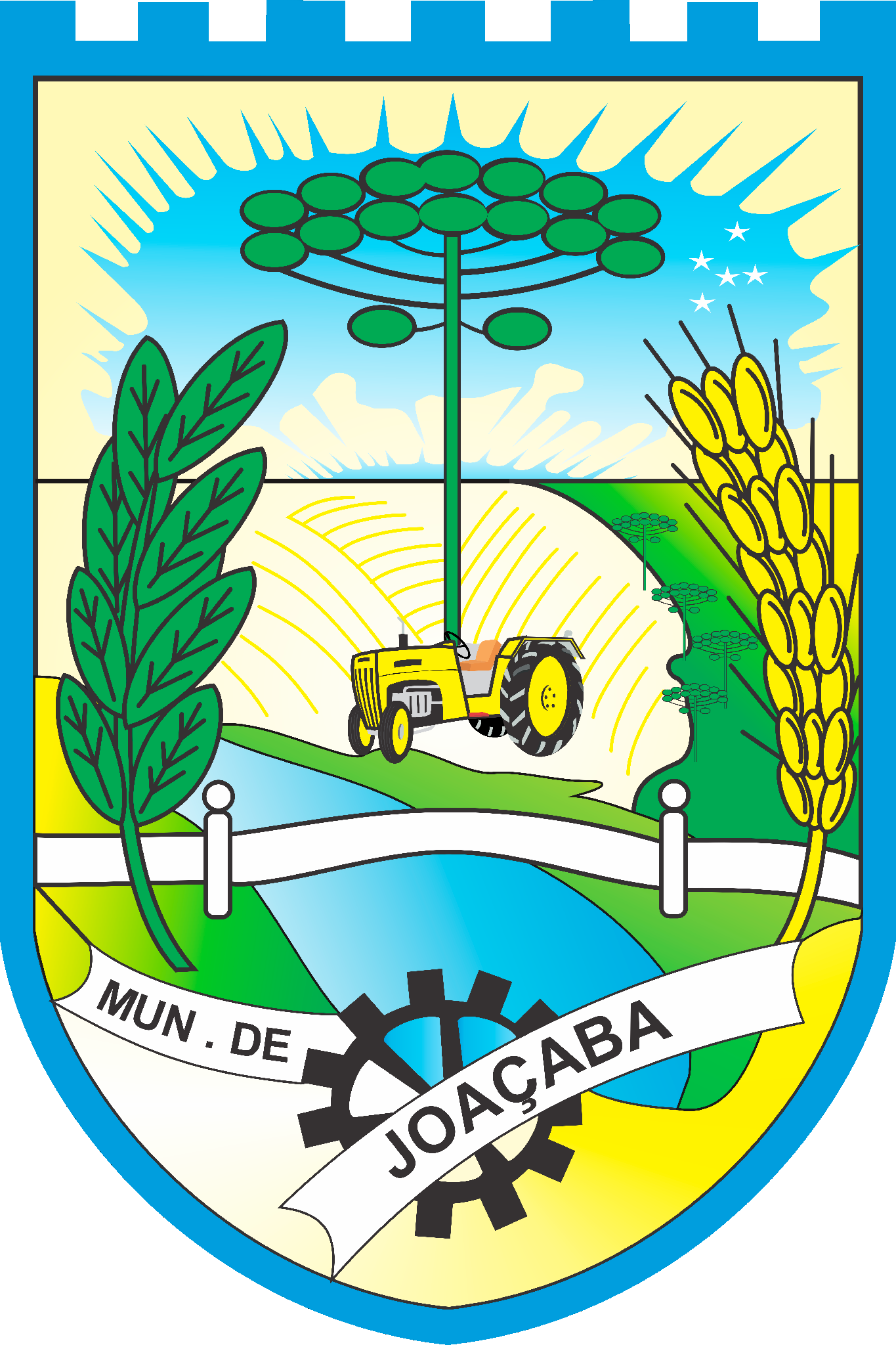
- Flag Coat of arms

- Location of Joaçaba

- Location within Brazil
- Coordinates: 27°10′22″S 51°30′03″W
- Country: Brazil
- Region: South
- State: (Santa Catarina (state)) Santa Catarina
- Founded: August 25, 1917

Government
  - Mayor: Dioclesio Ragnini

Area
  - Total: 232.354 km^{2} (89.712 sq mi)
- Elevation: 522 m (1,713 ft)

Population (2020)
  - Total: 30,404
  - Density: 105.16/km^{2} (272.4/sq mi)
- Time zone: UTC-3 (UTC-3)
  - Summer (DST): UTC-2 (UTC-2)
- HDI (2000): 0.866 – high
- Website: www.joacaba.sc.gov.br

Joaçaba is a city situated in the state of Santa Catarina, Brazil, with approximately 30,404 inhabitants. Located in 27º10'22" S and 51º30'03" W and 516.74 m above sea level, the city was colonized in the early 20th century by German and Italian immigrants.

Its industry is based on agriculture and agricultural products such as chicken and pork with China serving as a primary trade partner.

== History ==
This territory was considered Spanish territory as part of the Treaty of Tordesillas (1494). However, the Portuguese occupied this territory from early on.

In 1916, the State of Santa Catarina and its northern neighbor, the State of Paraná, fought for this land, in the so-called Guerra do Contestado ("War of the Contested Land"). Santa Catarina State won control of the region, and since then it has been under its jurisdiction.

On August 25, 1917, Joaçaba was established as Cruzeiro, and through its history has also been called Limeira and Cruzeiro do Sul, until federal legislation in 1943 prohibited cities in Brazil from sharing the same name (there is a Limeira in the State of São Paulo).

The current name Joaçaba is derived from the Tupi, with the meaning of "crossway."

Today, the city is known for its medical center, which brings medical students and patients from all over Santa Catarina, as well as for its university (UNOESC – Universidade do Oeste de Santa Catarina) which attracts students from all over the country.

It is also noted for its Carnaval and the high quality of life for its inhabitants, which was ranked 1st for the state of Santa Catarina and 8th for Brazil.

The IDH (HDI) list (Índice de Desenvolvimento Humano – Index of Human Development), provided by the UN, gave Joaçaba the score of "0.953" in a scale of 0 to 1 for the year 2003.

The city is served by Santa Terezinha Airport.

== Climate ==
Joaçaba is classified as oceanic climate (Köppen climate classification: Cfb), the average temperature in summer is 28 °C (82 °F). In winter, it reaches 18 °C (64 °F), but rarely 5 °C (41 °F), snow is rare, but frost is common.

== See also ==
- List of municipalities in Santa Catarina
