= Chapecó Airport =

Serafin Enoss Bertaso Airport Aeroporto Serafin Enoss Bertaso
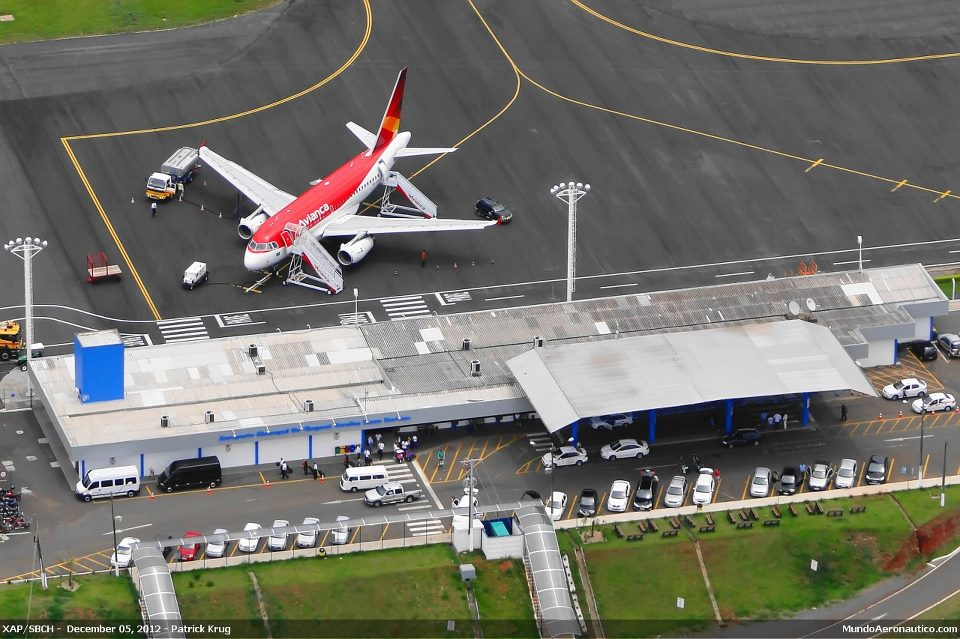
- IATA: XAP; ICAO: SBCH; LID: SC0003

Summary
- Airport type: Public
- Operator: Voe XAP
- Serves: Chapecó
- Time zone: BRT (UTC−03:00)
- Elevation AMSL: 654 m (2,146 ft)
- Coordinates: 27°08′02″S 052°39′32″W

Map
- Location in Brazil

Runways
Direction	Length		Surface
Direction	m	ft	Surface
12/30	2,060	6,759	Asphalt
- Sources: ANAC, DECEA

Serafin Enoss Bertaso Airport (IATA: XAP, ICAO: SBCH) is the airport serving Chapecó, Brazil.

The airport is operated by Voe XAP.

== History ==
The terminal was commissioned on March 18, 1978. On October 1, 2010, the State Government of Santa Catarina authorized renovation works focusing mainly on the runway.

== Airlines and destinations ==
Airlines	Destinations
Azul Brazilian Airlines	Campinas, Florianópolis
Gol Linhas Aéreas	Florianópolis, São Paulo–Congonhas, São Paulo–Guarulhos
LATAM Brasil	São Paulo–Guarulhos

== Accidents and incidents ==
- 22 January 1976: a Transbrasil Embraer EMB 110C Bandeirante registration PT-TBD operating flight 107 from Chapecó to Erechim, crashed upon take-off from Chapecó. Seven of the nine passengers and crew on board died.

== Access ==
The airport is located 10 km (6 mi) from downtown Chapecó.

== See also ==
- List of airports in Brazil
