= Sul Catarinense =

Mesoregion in Santa Catarina, Brazil

Coordinates: 28°40′40″S 49°22′12″W

Mesoregion Sul Catarinense

Sul Catarinense is a mesoregion in the Brazilian state of Santa Catarina.
