= Videira =

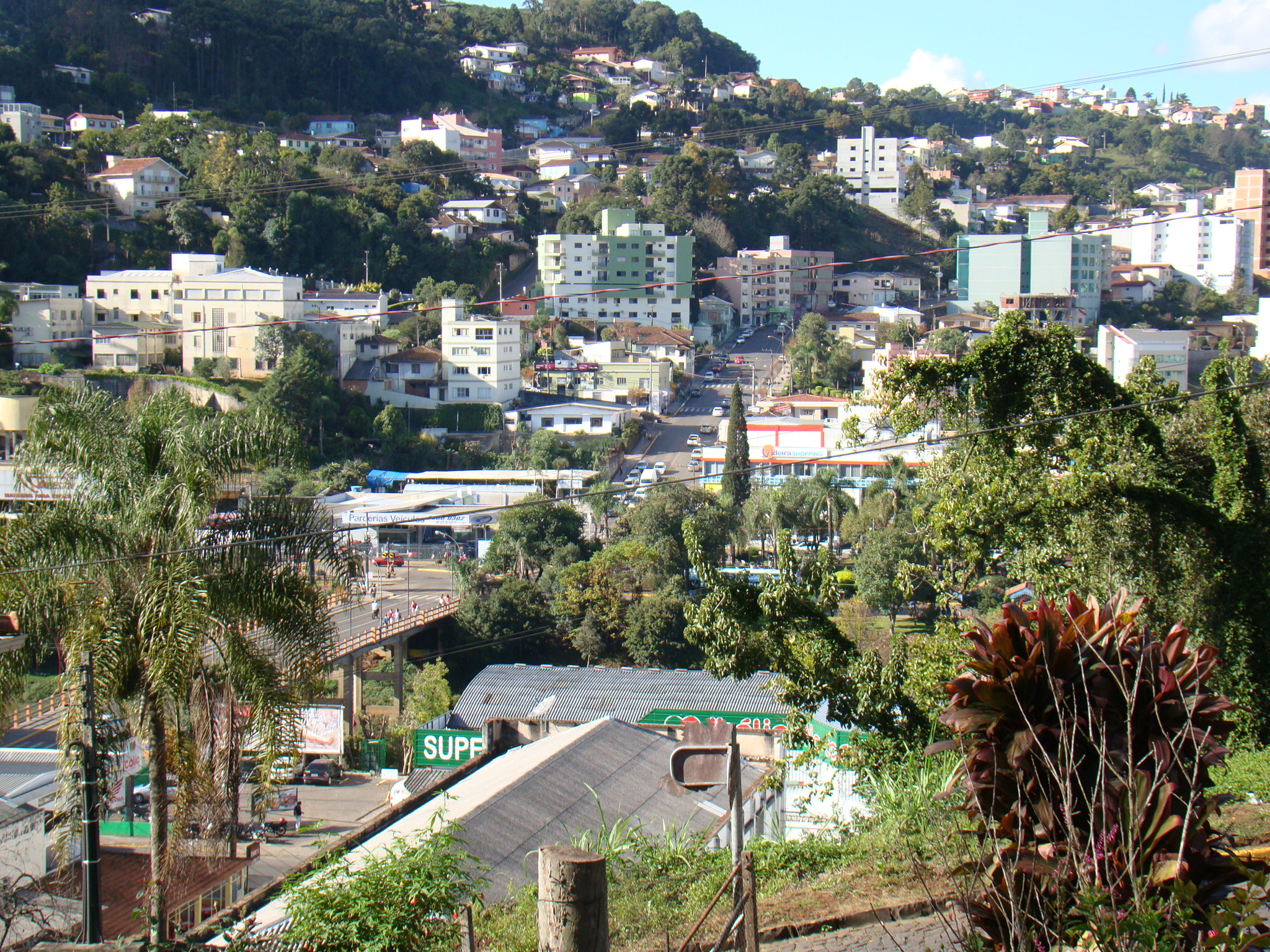

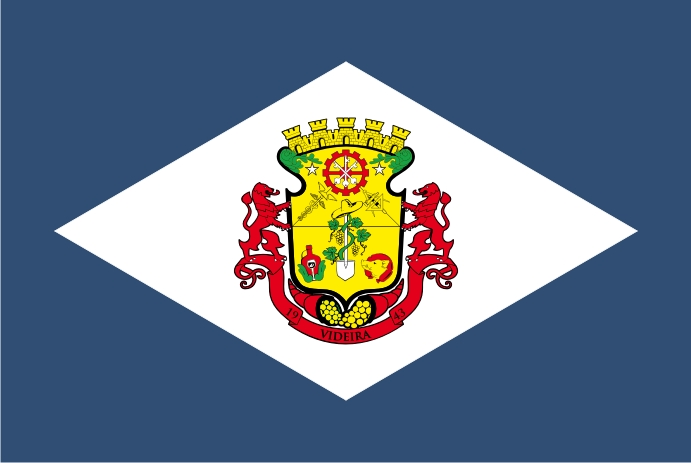
- Flag Coat of arms
- Nickname: Capital do Vinho (the Wine Capital)
- Location of Videira

- Location within Brazil
- Coordinates: 27°00′19″S 51°09′14″W
- Country: Brazil
- Region: South
- State: Santa Catarina
- Founded: March 1, 1944

Government
  - Mayor: Wilmar Carelli (PMDB)

Area
  - Total: 377.852 km^{2} (145.889 sq mi)
- Elevation: 750 m (2,460 ft)

Population (2020)
  - Total: 53,610
  - Density: 125.7/km^{2} (326/sq mi)
- Time zone: UTC-3 (UTC-3)
  - Summer (DST): UTC-2 (UTC-2)
- HDI (2000): 0.851
- Website: www.videira.sc.gov.br

Videira is a city in the state of Santa Catarina in Brazil. The estimated population in 2020 was 53,610 inhabitants. The city is called "Capital do Vinho" (The Wine Capital) in reference to the production of this alcoholic drink. In the past, Videira was one of the major producers of grapes in Brazil. Perdigão Agroindustrial S.A., one of the major food industry conglomerates of Brazil, originated in Videira.

Ângelo Ponzoni Airport serves the city.

== Climate ==
Climate data for Videira, elevation 779 m (2,556 ft), (1976–2005)
| Month | Jan | Feb | Mar | Apr | May | Jun | Jul | Aug | Sep | Oct | Nov | Dec | Year |
|---|---|---|---|---|---|---|---|---|---|---|---|---|---|
| Record high °C (°F) | 34.2 (93.6) | 34.6 (94.3) | 35.0 (95.0) | 32.4 (90.3) | 30.5 (86.9) | 28.4 (83.1) | 30.0 (86.0) | 33.4 (92.1) | 35.1 (95.2) | 34.8 (94.6) | 38.0 (100.4) | 38.8 (101.8) | 38.8 (101.8) |
| Mean daily maximum °C (°F) | 27.8 (82.0) | 27.6 (81.7) | 26.7 (80.1) | 24.2 (75.6) | 21.3 (70.3) | 19.7 (67.5) | 19.9 (67.8) | 21.5 (70.7) | 22.2 (72.0) | 24.3 (75.7) | 26.2 (79.2) | 27.6 (81.7) | 24.1 (75.4) |
| Daily mean °C (°F) | 21.8 (71.2) | 21.6 (70.9) | 20.2 (68.4) | 17.0 (62.6) | 13.7 (56.7) | 12.2 (54.0) | 12.3 (54.1) | 13.6 (56.5) | 15.5 (59.9) | 17.7 (63.9) | 19.4 (66.9) | 21.2 (70.2) | 17.2 (62.9) |
| Mean daily minimum °C (°F) | 16.8 (62.2) | 16.8 (62.2) | 15.3 (59.5) | 11.9 (53.4) | 8.5 (47.3) | 6.9 (44.4) | 6.5 (43.7) | 8.0 (46.4) | 10.0 (50.0) | 12.5 (54.5) | 13.8 (56.8) | 15.8 (60.4) | 11.9 (53.4) |
| Record low °C (°F) | 4.8 (40.6) | 5.2 (41.4) | −3.6 (25.5) | −2.8 (27.0) | −5.4 (22.3) | −8.6 (16.5) | −7.3 (18.9) | −7.2 (19.0) | −3.6 (25.5) | 8.0 (46.4) | 4.0 (39.2) | 2.6 (36.7) | −8.6 (16.5) |
| Average precipitation mm (inches) | 210.0 (8.27) | 188.0 (7.40) | 139.0 (5.47) | 104.0 (4.09) | 128.0 (5.04) | 126.0 (4.96) | 110.0 (4.33) | 102.0 (4.02) | 175.0 (6.89) | 198.0 (7.80) | 148.0 (5.83) | 178.0 (7.01) | 1,806 (71.11) |
| Average relative humidity (%) | 76 | 79 | 80 | 81 | 81 | 81 | 80 | 76 | 75 | 75 | 73 | 74 | 78 |
| Mean monthly sunshine hours | 201 | 167 | 186 | 158 | 157 | 140 | 159 | 165 | 154 | 172 | 203 | 222 | 2,084 |
Source 1: Empresa Brasileira de Pesquisa Agropecuária (EMBRAPA)
Source 2: Climatempo (precipitation)
