= Afonso Pena International Airport =

Airport serving Curitiba, Brazil

Curitiba–Afonso Pena International Airport Aeroporto Internacional de Curitiba–Afonso Pena

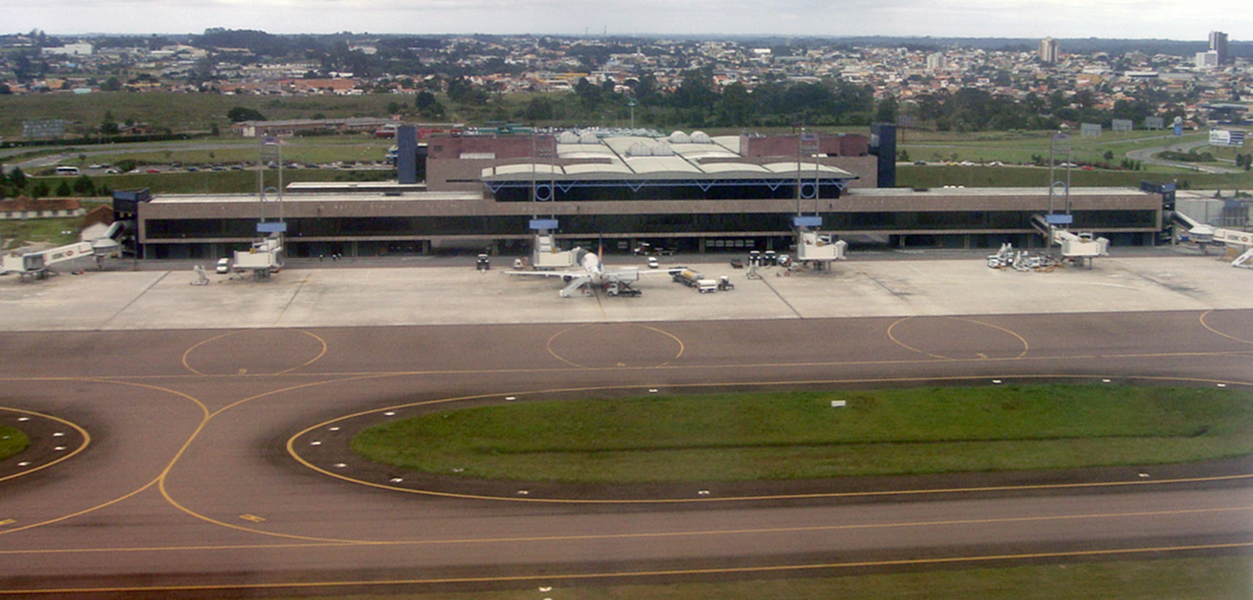
- IATA: CWB; ICAO: SBCT; LID: PR0001

Summary
- Airport type: Public
- Operator: Infraero (1974–2021); Motiva (2021–2026); ASUR (2026–present)
- Serves: Curitiba
- Location: São José dos Pinhais, Brazil
- Opened: 24 January 1946; 80 years ago
- Focus city for: Azul Brazilian Airlines
- Time zone: BRT (UTC−03:00)
- Elevation AMSL: 911 m (2,989 ft)
- Coordinates: 25°31′54″S 049°10′34″W
- Website: aeroportos.motiva.com.br/curitiba-pr/

Map
- Location in Brazil CWB (Brazil)

Runways
| Direction | Length | | Surface |
| Direction | m | ft | Surface |
|---|---|---|---|
| 15/33 | 2,218 | 7,277 | Asphalt |
| 11/29 | 1,798 | 5,899 | Asphalt |

Statistics (2025)
- Passengers: 6,082,222 ▲17%
- Aircraft Operations: 62,453 ▲12%
- Statistics: Motiva; Sources: Airport Website, ANAC, DECEA

Curitiba-President Afonso Pena International Airport (IATA: CWB, ICAO: SBCT) is the main airport serving Curitiba, located in the municipality of São José dos Pinhais, in the state of Paraná. Since July 15, 1985 it is named after Afonso Augusto Moreira Pena (1847–1909), the 6th President of Brazil.

It is operated by ASUR.

== History ==
Similar to other airports strategically placed on the coast of Brazil, Afonso Pena, was built by the Brazilian Air Force Ministry in partnership with the United States Army during the Second World War. However, since its construction was completed only in 1945, shortly before the end of the war, Afonso Pena never saw heavy military movement. On January 24, 1946, it was dedicated as a civil airport.

The original passenger terminal was in use until 1959 when a new terminal was built. This terminal is used until 1996 when the much larger terminal opened. After the new terminal opened, the older terminal became a cargo terminal.

The unstable weather conditions of the region are the main problem with the airport, particularly fog and smog in the morning hours of winter and the fact that the auxiliary runway 11/29 is too small and plagued with old equipment. There are also plans to upgrade runway 15/33 from an ILS CAT II runway to ILS CAT III.

Since the bottleneck for the airport is the cargo capacity, the main runway was lengthened in 2008 to allow cargo flights to operate with greater loads and the cargo terminal was upgraded.

On 31 August 2009, Infraero unveiled a BRL30 million (USD16 million; EUR11 million) investment plan to upgrade Afonso Pena International Airport focusing on the preparations for the 2014 FIFA World Cup which were held in Brazil, Curitiba being one of the venue cities. The investment included the enlargement of the apron and implementation of taxiways. The terminal is 45,000 m^{2}, has 14 jetways, and is capable of handling 15 million passengers annually. There are 800 parking places. The airport complex includes a small museum, a playcenter and a mall with 60 stores inside the main terminal.

Responding to critiques to the situation of its airports, on May 18, 2011, Infraero released a list evaluating some of its most important airports according to its saturation levels. According to the list, Curitiba was considered to be requiring attention, operating between 70% and 85% of its capacity. American Airlines launched service to Miami in November 2013. The outbound flight operated via Porto Alegre, while the inbound one was nonstop. The carrier terminated the route in February 2016.

Previously operated by Infraero, on April 7, 2021, CCR won a 30-year concession to operate the airport. On April 26, 2025 CCR was rebranded as Motiva.

On November 18, 2025 the entire airports portfolio of Motiva was sold to the Mexican airport operator ASUR. Motiva will cease to operate airports. The transaction was completed on August 31, 2026.

== Airlines and destinations ==
=== Passenger ===
| Airlines | Destinations |
|---|---|
| Aerolíneas Argentinas | Buenos Aires–Aeroparque |
| Azul Brazilian Airlines | Belo Horizonte–Confins, Campinas, Cascavel, Foz do Iguaçu, Londrina, Maringá, Pato Branco, Porto Alegre, Rio de Janeiro–Galeão, São Paulo–Congonhas, São Paulo–Guarulhos; Seasonal: Florianópolis, Maceió, Recife |
| Azul Conecta | Guaíra, União da Vitória |
| Gol Linhas Aéreas | Brasília, Maringá, Rio de Janeiro–Galeão, Salvador da Bahia (ends 30 January 2027), São Paulo–Congonhas, São Paulo–Guarulhos |
| JetSmart Chile | Seasonal: Santiago de Chile |
| LATAM Brasil | Brasília, Cuiabá (begins 1 March 2027), Foz do Iguaçu, Londrina (begins 8 March 2027), Porto Alegre, Rio de Janeiro–Galeão, São Paulo–Congonhas, São Paulo–Guarulhos |
| LATAM Chile | Santiago de Chile |
| LATAM Perú | Lima |
| TAP Air Portugal | Lisbon |

=== Cargo ===
| Airlines | Destinations |
|---|---|
| Avianca Cargo | Campinas |
| Cargolux | Luxembourg |
| Cargolux Italia | Milan-Malpensa |
| LATAM Cargo Brasil | Miami |
| LATAM Cargo Chile | Santiago de Chile |
| Lufthansa Cargo | Campinas, Frankfurt, Recife |

== Statistics ==
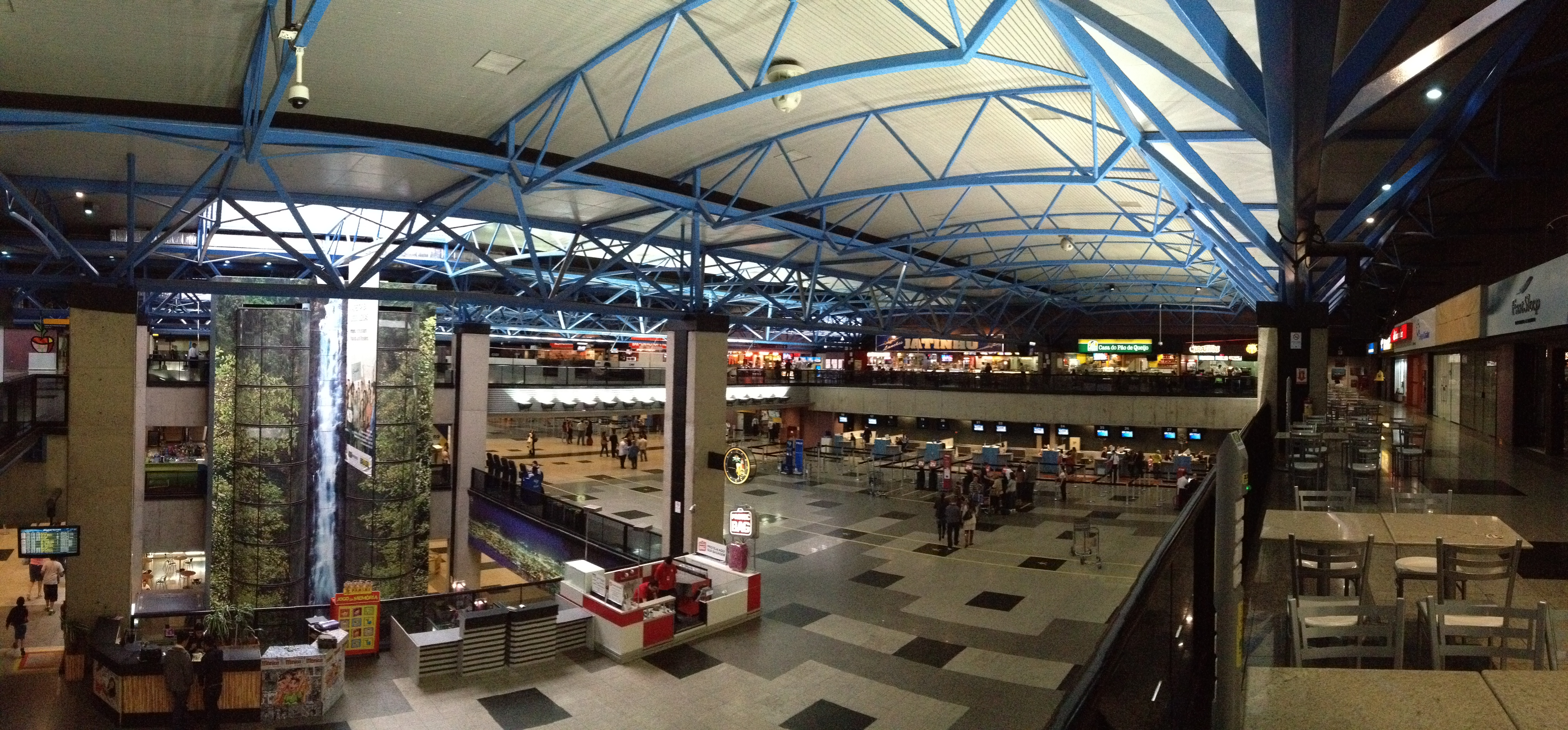
Panoramic view of the passenger terminal

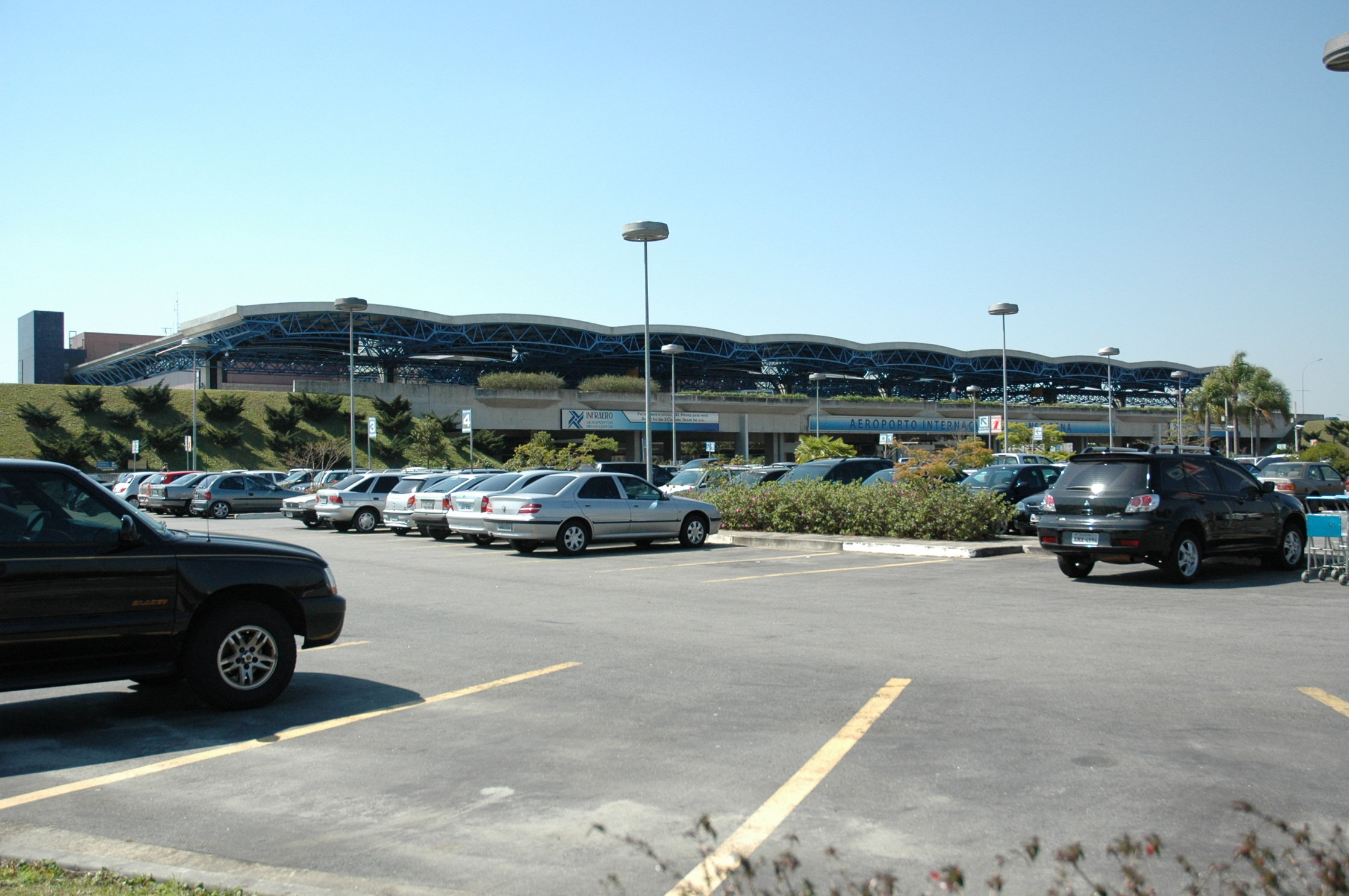
Terminal landside view

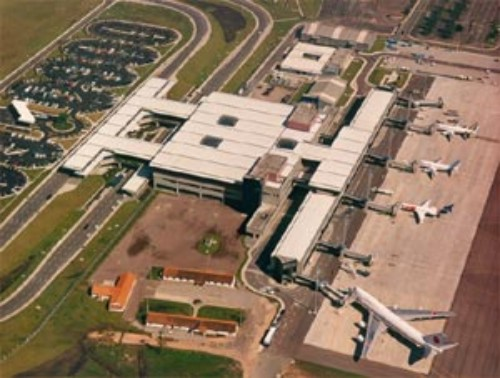
Aerial view of the terminal in 2005

Following are the number of passenger, aircraft and cargo movements at the airport, according to Infraero (2007-2021) and Motiva (2022-2025) reports:

| Year | Passenger | Aircraft | Cargo (t) |
|---|---|---|---|
| 2025 | 6,082,222 ▲17% | 62,453 ▲12% | |
| 2024 | 5,179,747 ▼7% | 55,820 ▼8% | |
| 2023 | 5,565,810 | 60,542 | |
| 2022^{a} | 3,899,773 | 45,005 | |
| 2021 | 3,111,942 ▲23% | 34,225 ▲19% | 20,003 ▲2% |
| 2020 | 2,520,710 ▼61% | 28,747 ▼57% | 19,553 ▼44% |
| 2019 | 6,502,746 ▲3% | 66,371 ▲3% | 34,664 ▲6% |
| 2018 | 6,310,413 ▼6% | 64,683 ▼4% | 32,672 ▲16% |
| 2017 | 6,722,058 ▲5% | 67,457 ▲2% | 28,220 ▲10% |
| 2016 | 6,385,838 ▼12% | 66,386 ▼12% | 25,730 ▼12% |
| 2015 | 7,235,634 ▼2% | 75,722 ▼4% | 29,278 ▼16% |
| 2014 | 7,376,743 ▲9% | 78,790 ▼4% | 34,938 ▼9% |
| 2013 | 6,742,133 ▼1% | 82,455 ▼7% | 38,355 ▼14% |
| 2012 | 6,828,334 ▼2% | 88,909 ▼6% | 44,478 ▲34% |
| 2011 | 6,969,484 ▲21% | 94,143 ▲7% | 33,152 ▲36% |
| 2010 | 5,774,615 ▲19% | 88,217 ▲10% | 24,417 ▲8% |
| 2009 | 4,853,733 ▲13% | 80,017 ▲16% | 22,604 ▼13% |
| 2008 | 4,281,354 ▲10% | 69,076 ▲10% | 26,072 ▲12% |
| 2007 | 3,907,275 | 62,563 | 23,322 |

Note:
^{a}: 2022 series provided by CCR is incomplete, lacking data for the months of January, February and part of March.

== Accidents and incidents ==
- 16 June 1958: a Cruzeiro do Sul Convair 440, registration PP-CEP, flying from Florianópolis to Curitiba, was on final approach procedures to land at Curitiba in bad weather when it was caught in windshear. The aircraft descended and struck the ground. Of the 27 passengers and crew aboard, 24 died. Among the deaths was the Brazilian interim president at that time, Nereu Ramos.
- 3 November 1967: a Sadia Handley Page Dart Herald, registration PP-SDJ, flying from São Paulo-Congonhas to Curitiba, collided with a hill during approach to land at Curitiba. All 5 crew members and 21 passengers died. 4 passengers survived.
- 16 August 2000: a VASP Boeing 737-200 registration PP-SMG, en route from Foz do Iguaçu to Curitiba, was hijacked by 5 persons demanding the BRL 5 million (approximately US$2.75 million at that time) that the aircraft was transporting. The pilot was forced to land at Porecatu, where the hijackers fled with the money. There were no injuries.
- 26 December 2002: a Brazilian Air Force Embraer EMB 110 Bandeirante, registration FAB-2292, en route from São Paulo-Campo de Marte to Florianópolis Air Force Base, crashed while trying to carry out an emergency landing at Curitiba-Afonso Pena. Reportedly, both engines had shut down. The airplane had taken off with insufficient fuel on board to complete the flight to Florianópolis. Of the 16 people on board, 1 crew member and 2 passengers died.
- 22 August 2007: an Embraer EMB 110 Bandeirante registration PT-SDB belonging to Two Taxi Aéreo crashed after take-off. The two occupants died.

== Access ==
The airport is located 18 km (11 mi) southeast of downtown Curitiba. The airport operates a shuttle bus to the center of Curitiba and the 208 bus route also connects passengers to the airport.

== See also ==
- List of airports in Brazil
