= Joaçaba Airport =

Santa Terezinha Municipal Airport Aeroporto Municipal Santa Terezinha
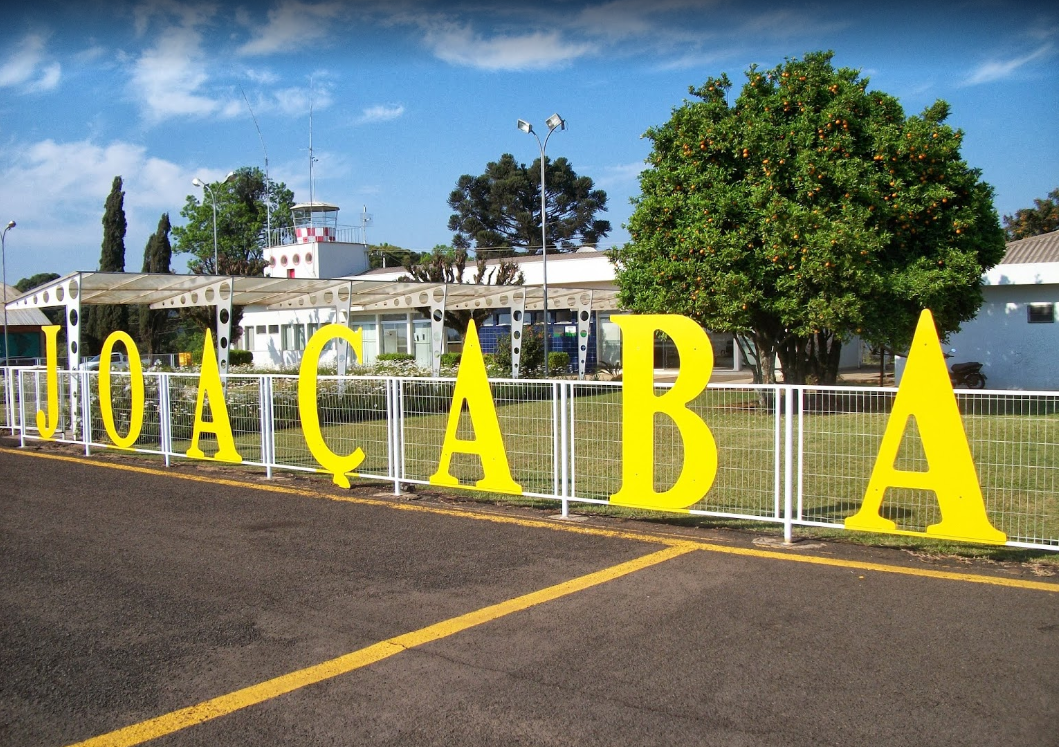
- Apron side of the terminal building
- IATA: JCB; ICAO: SSJA; LID: SC0014

Summary
- Airport type: Public
- Serves: Joaçaba
- Time zone: BRT (UTC−03:00)
- Elevation AMSL: 776 m (2,546 ft)
- Coordinates: 27°10′22″S 051°33′06″W

Map
- Location in Brazil

Runways
Direction	Length		Surface
Direction	m	ft	Surface
15/33	1,260	4,134	Asphalt
- Sources: ANAC, DECEA

Santa Terezinha Municipal Airport (IATA: JCB, ICAO: SSJA) is the airport serving Joaçaba, Brazil.

== History ==
The airport was commissioned in May 1949.

== Airlines and destinations ==
Airlines	Destinations
Azul Conecta	Florianópolis

== Access ==
The airport is located 6 km (4 mi) from downtown Joaçaba.

== See also ==
- List of airports in Brazil
