= Hercílio Luz International Airport =

International airport serving Florianópolis, Brazil

Florianópolis–Hercílio Luz International Airport Aeroporto Internacional de Florianópolis–Hercílio Luz
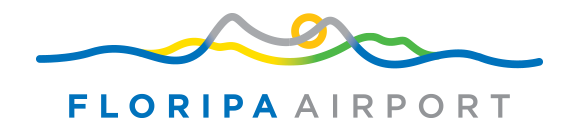

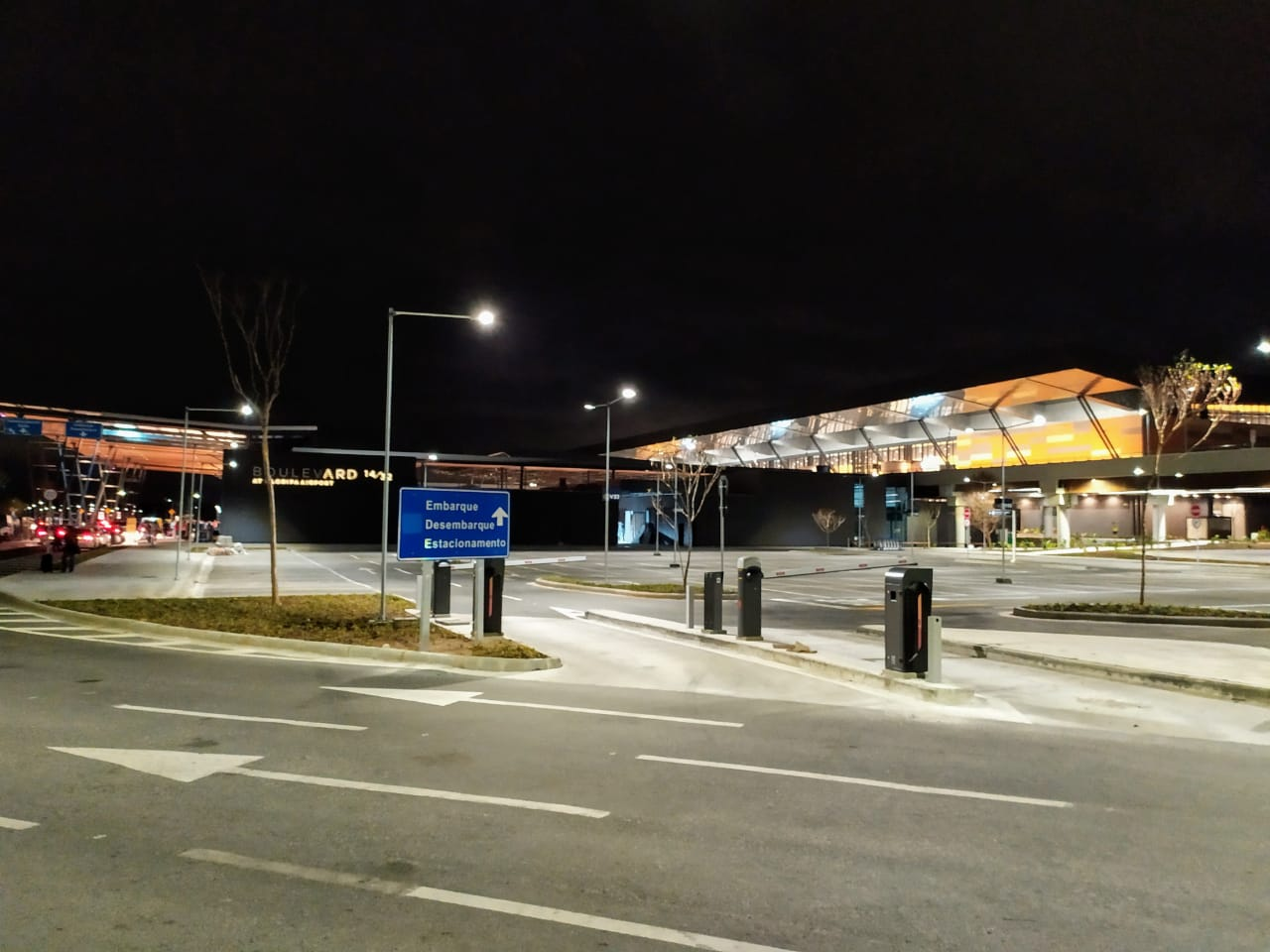
- IATA: FLN; ICAO: SBFL; LID: SC0001

Summary
- Airport type: Public/Military
- Operator: Infraero (1974–2017); Zurich Airport Brasil (2017–present)
- Serves: Florianópolis
- Opened: 1927
- Focus city for: Azul Brazilian Airlines; Gol Transportes Aéreos
- Time zone: BRT (UTC−03:00)
- Elevation AMSL: 5 m (16 ft)
- Coordinates: 27°40′13″S 048°33′09″W
- Website: floripa-airport.com

Map
- Location in Brazil

Runways
Direction	Length		Surface
Direction	m	ft	Surface
03/21	1,320	4,331	Concrete
14/32	2,400	7,874	Asphalt

Statistics (2025)
- Passengers: 5,180,583 ▲6%
- Aircraft Operations: 49,765 ▲2%
- Statistics: Zurich Airport Brasil; Sources: Airport Website, ANAC, DECEA

Florianópolis–Hercílio Luz International Airport (IATA: FLN, ICAO: SBFL), branded Floripa Airport, is the airport serving Florianópolis, Brazil. It is named after Hercílio Pedro da Luz (1860–1924), three times governor of the state of Santa Catarina and senator.

It is operated by Zurich Airport Brasil.

Some of its facilities are shared with the Florianópolis Air Force Base of the Brazilian Air Force.

== History ==
The airport was built on the site of an old Air Naval Base, which operated until 1941, when its jurisdiction changed to the Brazilian Air Force.

Between 1927 and 1932, the then known as Campeche Field was also used by the French aviators of the Compagnie Générale Aéropostale for its operations in Florianópolis. Among them were Jean Mermoz, Antoine de Saint-Exupéry and Henri Guillaumet.

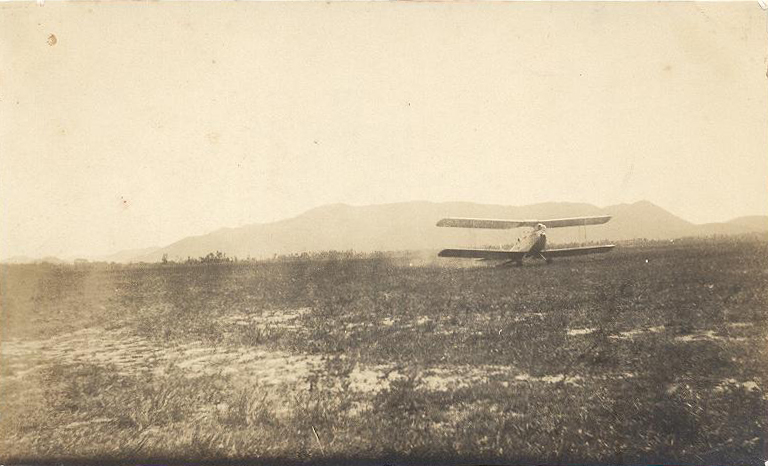
Campeche Field in 1933

Between 1942 and 1945, the runway 03/21, apron, control tower and passenger terminal were built. At the same time, some facilities of the Florianópolis Air Force Base were built and made operational.

In the period between 1952 and 1954, the passenger terminal was rebuilt and was operational until 1976 when a brand-new terminal building and apron were opened. The old facility is today the cargo terminal. The new terminal was further enlarged in 1988 and 2000, reaching the present 8,703 m^{2}.

In 1978, the runway 14/32 was opened allowing a great increase in traffic. In 1995, the airport was upgraded to international category and started receiving particularly seasonal and charter flights from Argentina, Chile, Paraguay, and Uruguay.

On March 16, 2017, Flughafen Zürich AG was granted the concession to operate and expand the airport, owning 100% of it.

On January 15, 2018, the new concessionaire began construction of a new terminal with 14 new gates - 3 international and 11 domestic. The cost of the project was BRL 570 million. The new terminal, located on the opposite side of the main runway from the old one, was officially opened on September 28, 2019. The main runway was also extended by 100 metres (330 ft), to 2,400 metres (7,900 ft). Operations using the new terminal started on October 1, 2019. In September 2024, TAP Air Portugal began nonstop service to Lisbon, giving Florianópolis its first flight to Europe.

== Airlines and destinations ==
The following airlines operate regular scheduled, seasonal, and charter flights at Florianópolis Airport:

Airlines	Destinations
Aerolíneas Argentinas	Buenos Aires–Aeroparque; Seasonal: Córdoba (AR), Rosario, Salta, Tucumán
Andes Líneas Aéreas	Seasonal charter: Buenos Aires–Ezeiza
Azul Brazilian Airlines	Belo Horizonte–Confins, Campinas, Chapecó; Seasonal: Curitiba
Azul Conecta	Blumenau, Caçador, Correia Pinto, Criciúma/Forquilhinha, Jaguaruna, Joaçaba, Joinville, Lages, São Miguel do Oeste
Copa Airlines	Panama City–Tocumen
Gol Linhas Aéreas	Brasília, Buenos Aires–Aeroparque, Buenos Aires–Ezeiza, Chapecó, Porto Alegre, Rio de Janeiro–Galeão, São Paulo–Congonhas, São Paulo–Guarulhos; Seasonal: Asunción, Córdoba (AR), Rosario
JetSmart Argentina	Buenos Aires–Aeroparque, Buenos Aires–Ezeiza; Seasonal: Córdoba (AR) (begins 16 December 2026)
JetSmart Chile	Santiago de Chile
LATAM Brasil	Brasília, Porto Alegre, São Paulo–Congonhas, São Paulo–Guarulhos; Seasonal: Buenos Aires–Ezeiza, Rio de Janeiro–Galeão
LATAM Chile	Buenos Aires–Ezeiza, Santiago de Chile
Paranair	Seasonal: Asunción
Sky Airline	Santiago de Chile
Sky Airline Peru	Seasonal: Lima, Montevideo
TAP Air Portugal	Lisbon

=== Cargo ===
Airlines	Destinations
LATAM Cargo Brasil	Miami

== Statistics ==
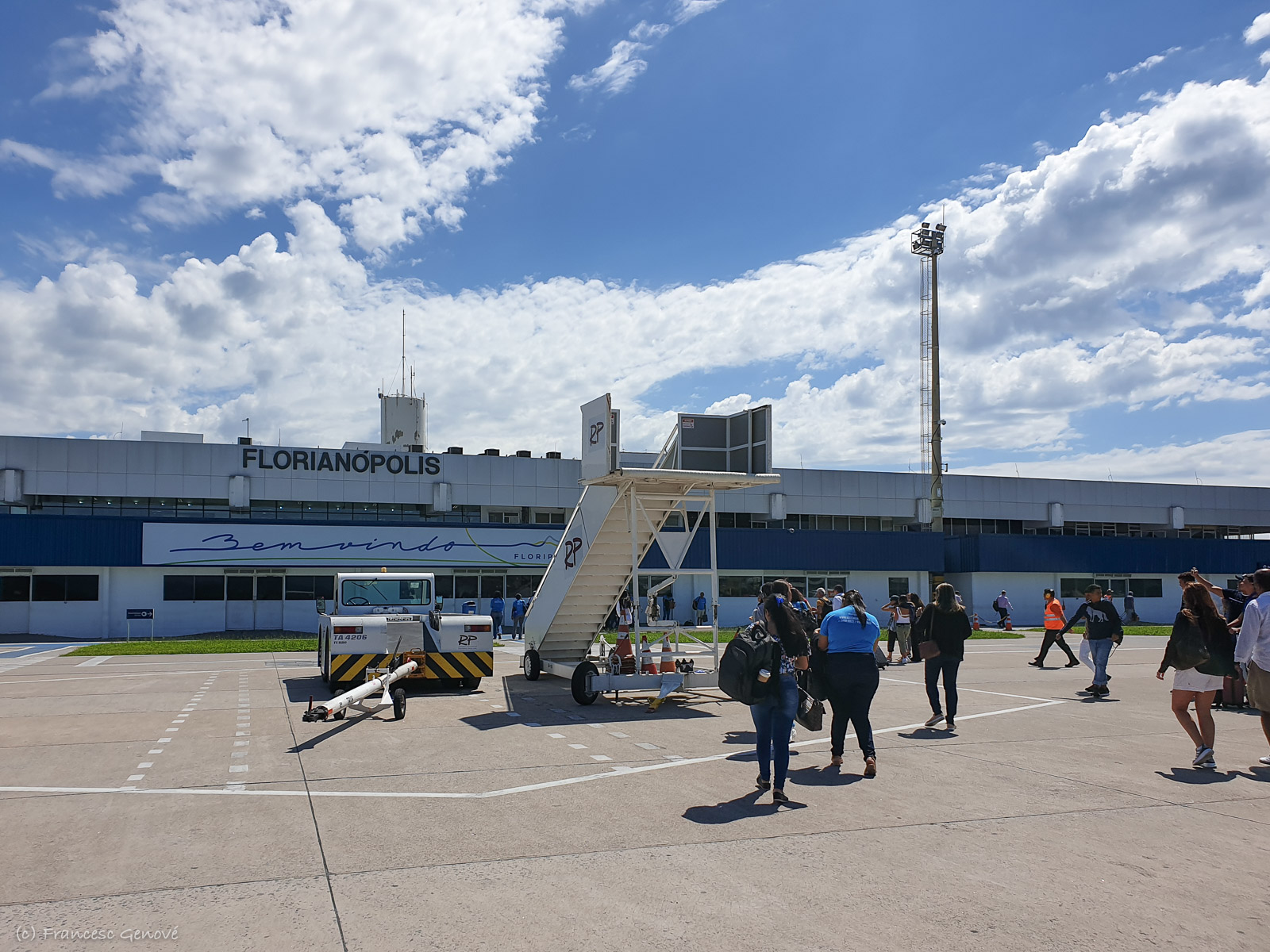
Old terminal building

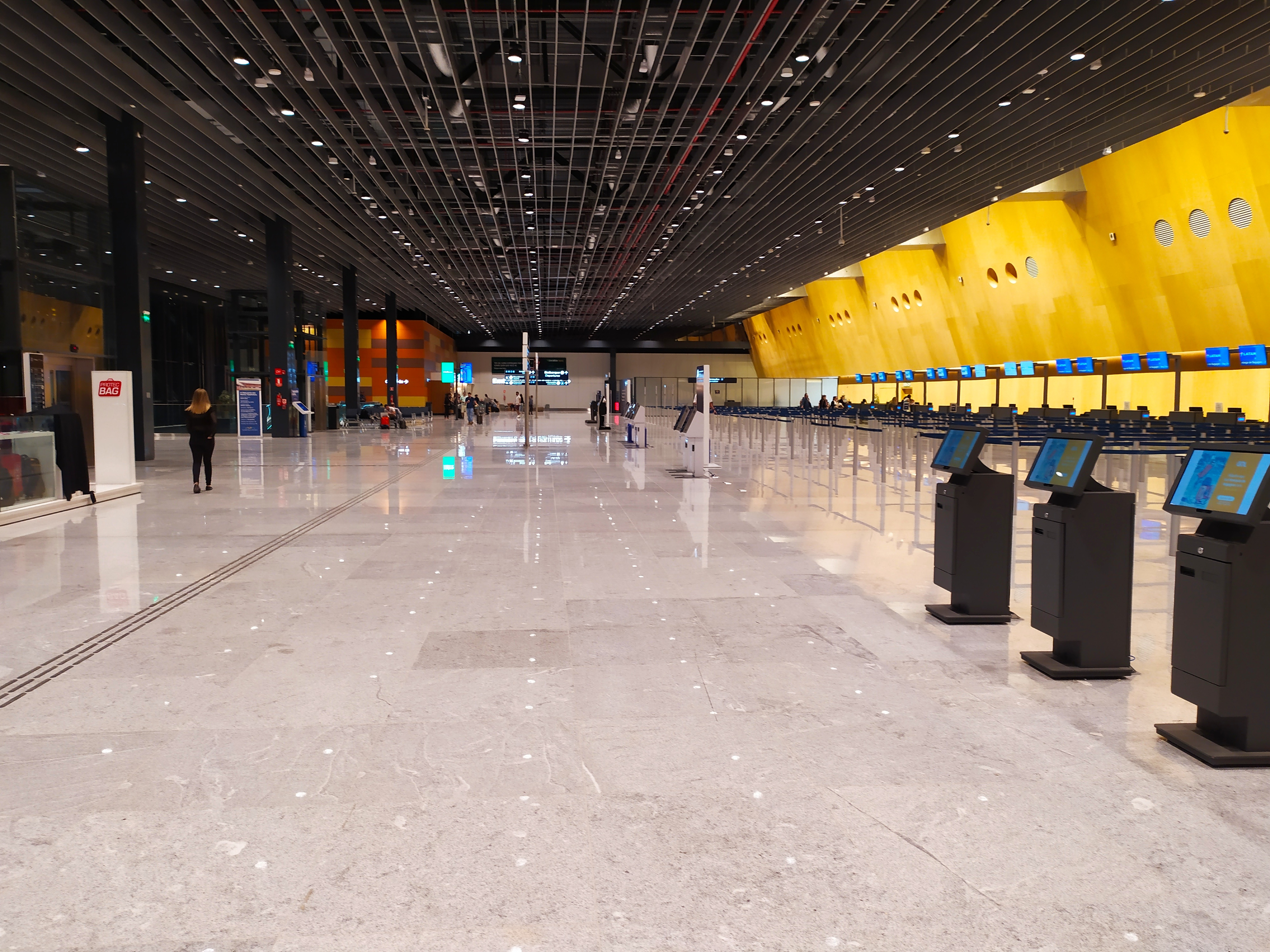
Check-in hall in 2019

Following are the number of passenger, aircraft and cargo movements at the airport, according to Infraero (2007-2017) and Zurich Airport (2018-2025) reports:

Year	Passenger	Aircraft	Cargo (t)
2025	5,180,583 ▲6%	49,765 ▲2%	
2024	4,906,929 ▲24%	48,746 ▲11%	
2023	3,969,940 ▲17%	44,108 ▲8%	
2022	3,403,031 ▲44%	40,936 ▲29%	
2021	2,358,800 ▲26%	31,715 ▲25%	
2020	1,869,890 ▼52%	25,360 ▼41%	
2019	3,918,230 ▲2%	42,623 ▼2%	
2018	3,839,348	43,615 ▼3%	
2017	3,843,328 ▲9%	44,795 ▲1%	5,021 ▲23%
2016	3,536,435 ▼4%	44,250 ▼7%	4,091 ▼13%
2015	3,693,486 ▲2%	47,347 ▼7%	4,682 ▲14%
2014	3,629,074 ▼6%	50,707 ▼6%	4,092 ▲68%
2013	3,872,877 ▲14%	54,216 ▼3%	2,430 ▲69%
2012	3,395,256 ▲9%	56,086 ▲14%	1,437 ▼82%
2011	3,122,035 ▲17%	49,097 ▲13%	7,894 ▲15%
2010	2,672,250 ▲27%	43,399 ▲9%	6,891 ▼6%
2009	2,108,383 ▲1%	39,790 ▲1%	7,294 ▼13%
2008	2,080,342 ▲7%	39,464 ▲8%	8,364 ▼10%
2007	1,948,010	36,451	9,341

== Accidents and incidents ==
- 22 March 1951: a Cruzeiro do Sul Douglas C-53D-DO plane, registration PP-CCX while landing at Florianópolis crashed following an overshoot in bad weather and an engine failure. Of the 14 passengers and crew, 3 died.
- 12 April 1980: a Transbrasil Boeing 727-27C operating flight 303 registration PT-TYS flying from São Paulo-Congonhas to Florianópolis while on a night instrumental approach to Florianópolis under a severe thunderstorm went off course, struck a hill and exploded. Probable causes are misjudgment of speed and distance, inadequate flight supervision, failure to initiate a go-around and improper operation of the engines. Of the 58 passengers and crew aboard, only 3 passengers survived.

== Access ==
The airport is located 14 km (9 mi) from downtown Florianópolis.

== See also ==
- List of airports in Brazil
- Florianópolis Air Force Base
