= Joinville-Lauro Carneiro de Loyola Airport =

Joinville–Lauro Carneiro de Loyola Airport Aeroporto de Joinville–Lauro Carneiro de Loyola

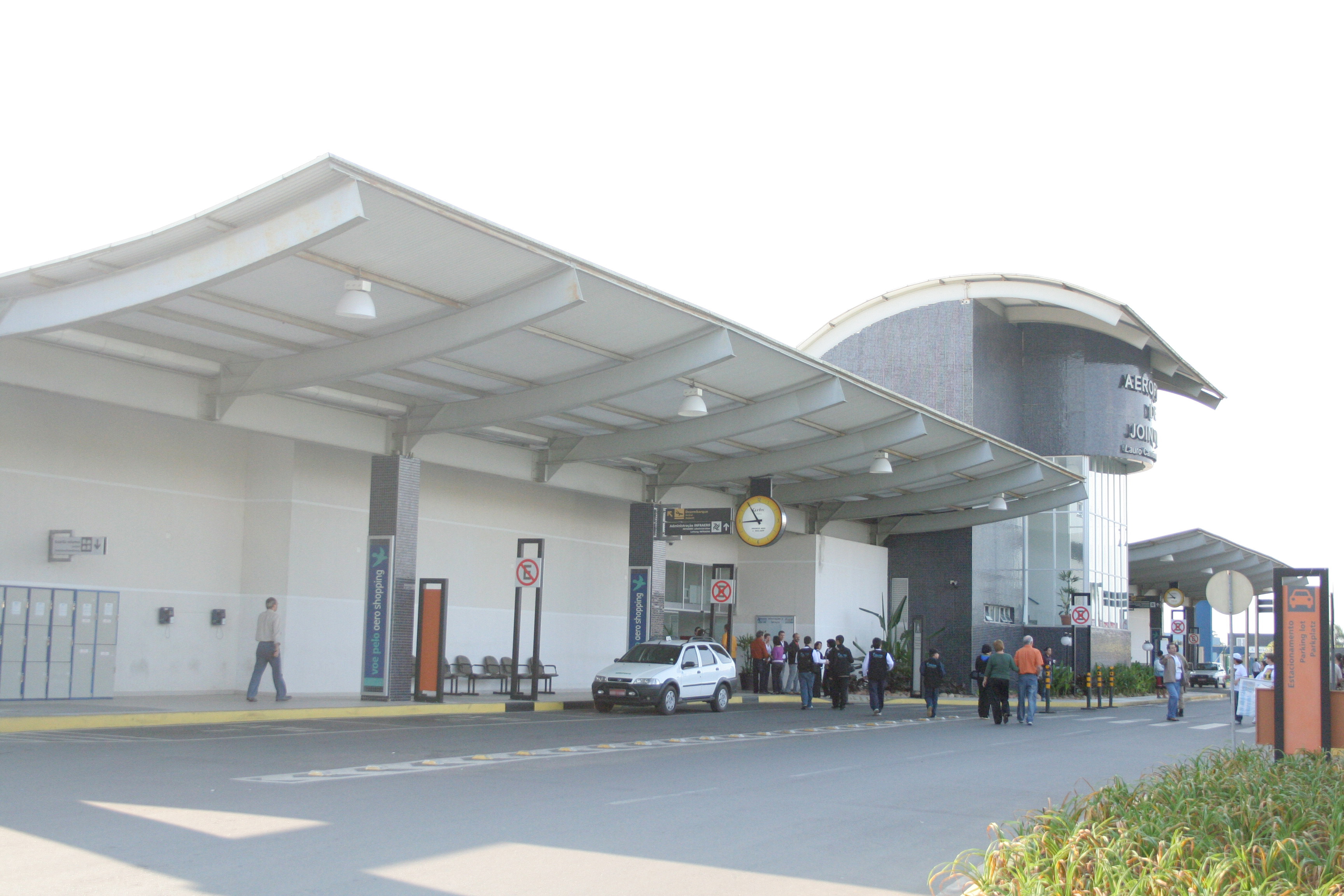
- IATA: JOI; ICAO: SBJV; LID: SC0004

Summary
- Airport type: Public
- Operator: Infraero (1974–2021); Motiva (2021–2026); ASUR (2026–present)
- Serves: Joinville
- Time zone: BRT (UTC−03:00)
- Elevation AMSL: 4 m (13 ft)
- Coordinates: 26°13′23″S 048°47′52″W
- Website: aeroportos.motiva.com.br/joinville-sc/

Map
- Location in Brazil

Runways
Direction	Length		Surface
Direction	m	ft	Surface
15/33	1,540	5,052	Asphalt

Statistics (2025)
- Passengers: 532,848 ▲20%
- Aircraft Operations: 0^{a}
- Statistics: Motiva; Sources: Airport Website, ANAC, DECEA; Note:^{a} 2025 Data for Aircraft Operations on Motiva website has mistakes.

Joinville–Lauro Carneiro de Loyola Airport (IATA: JOI, ICAO: SBJV) is the airport serving Joinville, Brazil. Since December 22, 2003 it is named after a local entrepreneur and politician.

It is operated by ASUR.

== History ==
The new terminal building was commissioned on March 8, 2004.

Previously operated by Infraero, on April 7, 2021 CCR won a 30-year concession to operate the airport. On April 26, 2025 CCR was rebranded as Motiva.

On November 18, 2025 the entire airports portfolio of Motiva was sold to the Mexican airport operator ASUR. Motiva will cease to operate airports. The transaction was completed on August 31, 2026.

== Airlines and destinations ==
Airlines	Destinations
Azul Brazilian Airlines	Campinas
Azul Conecta	Florianópolis, Jaguaruna
Gol Linhas Aéreas	São Paulo–Congonhas
LATAM Brasil	São Paulo–Congonhas, São Paulo–Guarulhos

== Accidents and incidents ==
- 13 September 1996: a Helisul Embraer EMB 110 Bandeirante registration PT-WAV operating a cargo flight from Porto Alegre to Joinville collided with a hill and crashed during final approach to land at Joinville. The crew of two died.

== Access ==
The airport is located 12 km (7 mi) from downtown Joinville.

== See also ==
- List of airports in Brazil
