= Transport in Uruguay =

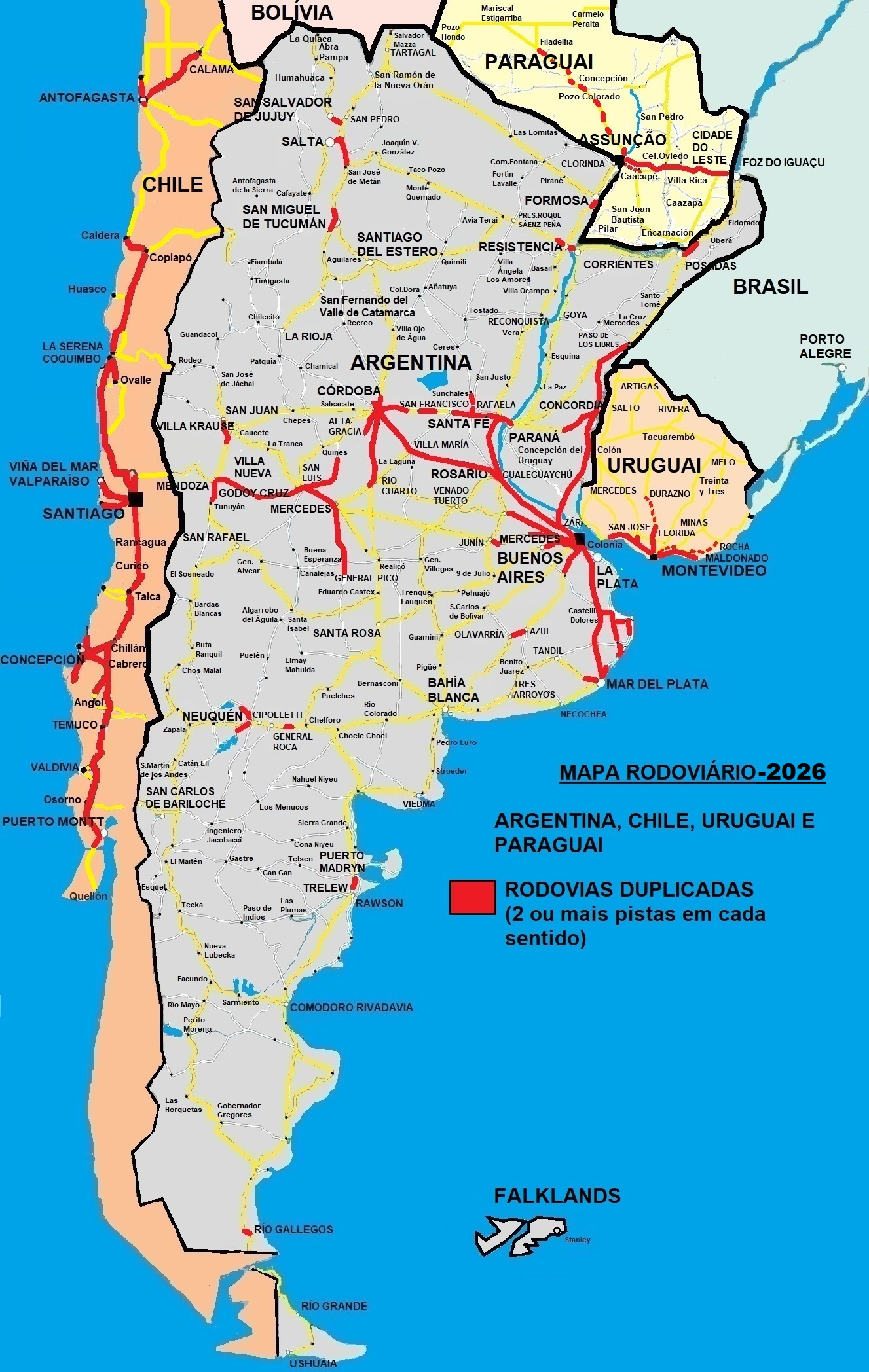
Road system in South America, with divided highways highlighted in red.

The transport network in Uruguay consists of 1,673 km of rail network, 7,743 km of paved roads, 1,600 km of navigable waterways, and 11 airports with paved roads.

== Railways ==
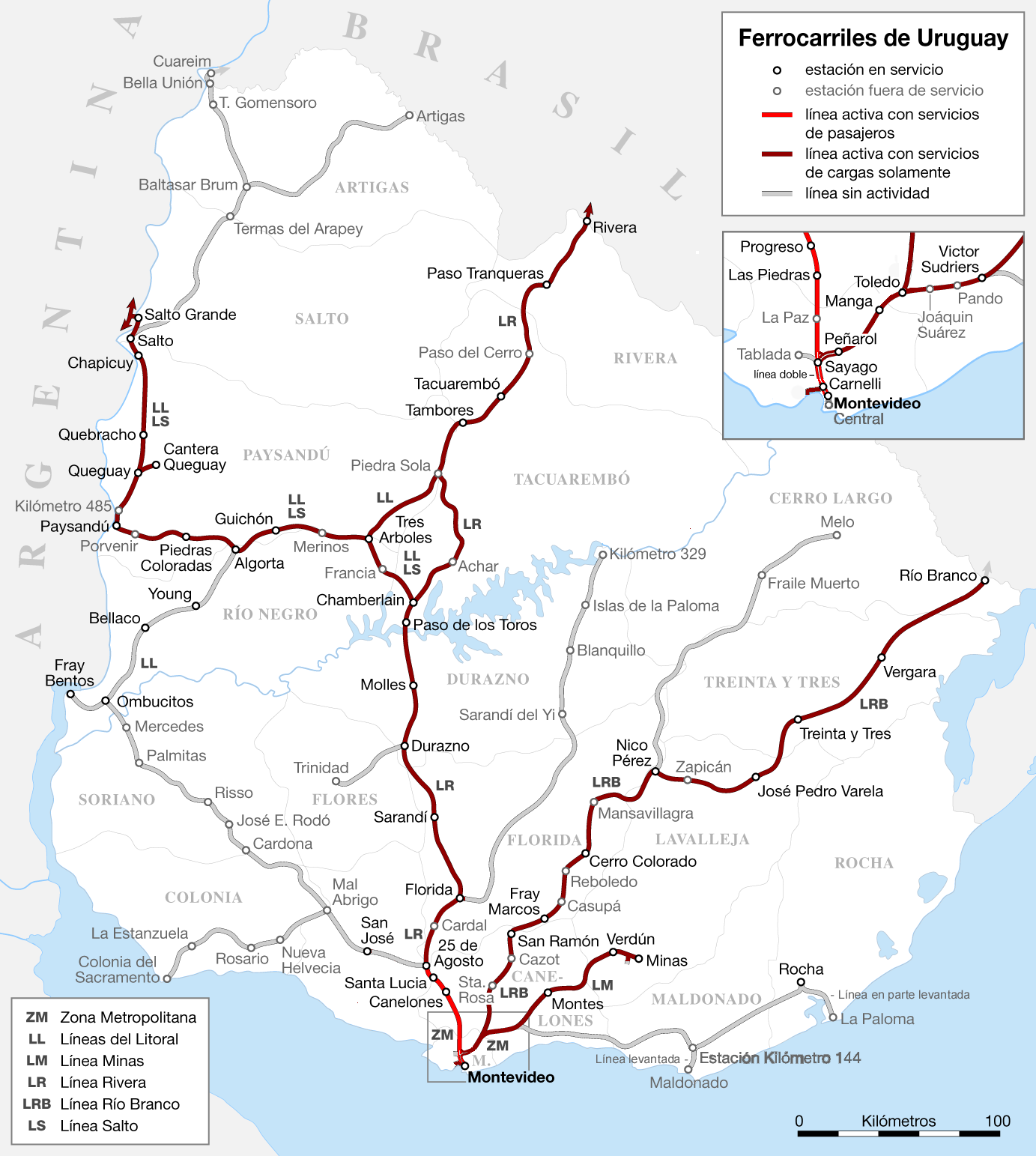
A map of Uruguay's railway network in 2016

Uruguayan railways have a total operational length of 1,673 kilometres (1,040 mi). All of them are standard gauge as of 2005.

=== Passenger services ===
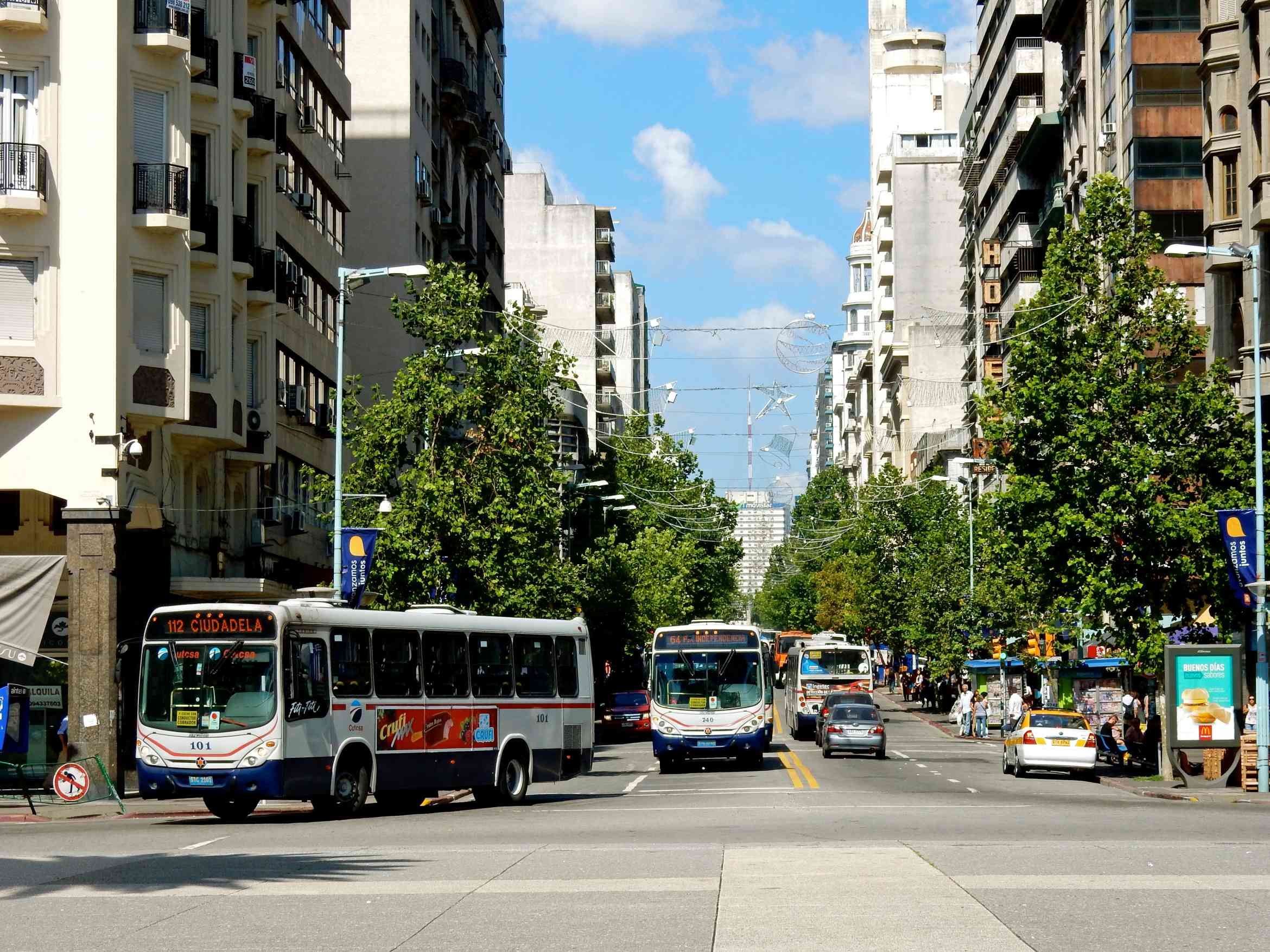
Plaza Independencia, Uruguay

Regular passenger services have been operated between Montevideo and 25 de Agosto (63km) since August 26, 1993 (previously all regular passenger services were withdrawn on January 2, 1988). One daily train was extended to San José (96km from Montevideo) on January 15, 2007 and another was extended from 25 de Agosto to Florida (109km from Montevideo) on January 2, 2008. Another line, which operates between Montevideo and Ingeniero Victor Sudriers, was reopened on December 15, 2005 (44km).

=== International links ===
- There is a 1,435 mm (4 ft 8 1/2 in) freight rail connection with Argentina over the Salto Grande Dam.
- There is a connection with Brazil which includes freight transshipment because of gauge difference (1,435 mm (4 ft 8 1/2 in) to 1,000 mm (3 ft 3 3/8 in)) at Santana do Livramento.

=== Future ===
The state railway administration AFE has announced that starting in January 2010, 419km of track will be renewed on the Pintado-Rivera section of the central main line and part of the international branch from Rivera to Santana do Livramento, north of Chamberlain, using Russian rail. The programme will cost $30m.

== Roadways ==
- Total roadways: 77,732 kilometres (48,300 mi)
- Paved roadways: 7,743 kilometres (4,811 mi)
- Unpaved: 69,989 kilometres (43,489 mi) (2010)

=== National Roads ===
- R1 Montevideo - Colonia del Sacramento
- R2 Rosario - Mercedes - Fray Bentos - border with Argentina.
- R3 Villa María - Trinidad - Paysandú - Salto - Bella Unión - border with Brazil.
- R5 Montevideo - Canelones - Durazno - Tacuarembó - Rivera - border with Brazil.
- R7 Montevideo - Fray Marcos - Melo
- R8 Montevideo - Minas - Treinta y Tres - Melo - Aceguá - border with Brazil.
- R9 Horno Mulato - Rocha - Chuy - border with Brazil.
- R11 Atlántida - Canelones - Eclida Paullier
- R26 Paysandú - border with Argentina - Tacuarembó - Melo - Río Branco - border with Brazil.

=== Motorways ===
Uruguay has a small network of motorways, owing to the low demand due to sparse population outside the capital. The few highways with 4 lanes are:

- Ruta 1: Montevideo - Colonia del Sacramento. Length: 148 kilometres (92 mi).
- Ruta Interbalnearia: Montevideo - Punta del Este. Length: 120 kilometres (75 mi).
- Ruta Gral. Fructuoso Rivera: Montevideo - Canelones. Length: 36 kilometres (22 mi).

=== Fuel stations ===
The traditional fuel stations were Ancap, Esso, Shell and Texaco. In 2005–2006, Petrobras bought the 90 Shell stations. In 2006–2007, Ancap bought the 90 Texaco stations. In 2011, Bridas bought the Esso stations but kept the brand.

== Waterways ==
Uruguay has 1,600 km of waterways.

== Ports and harbors ==
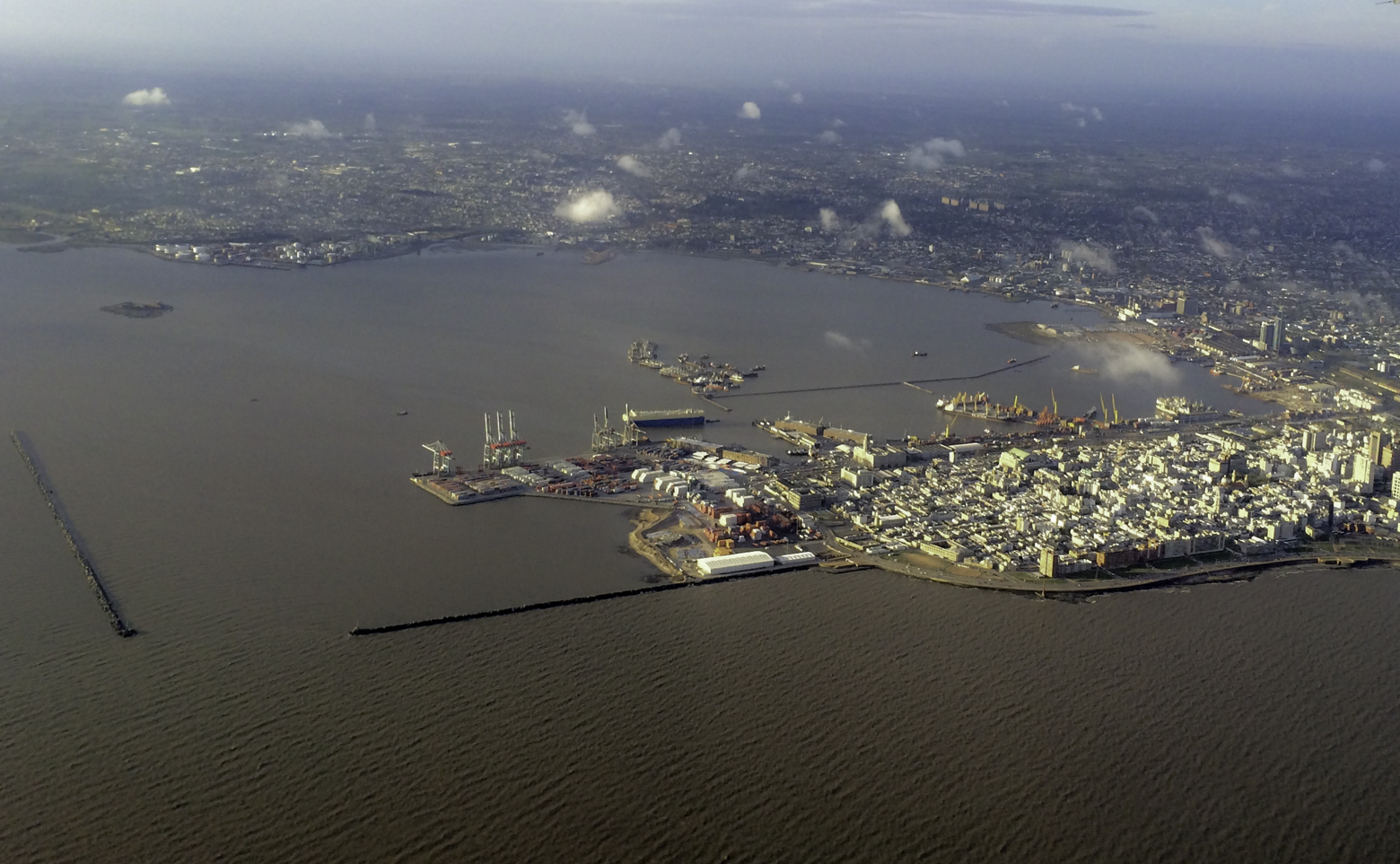
Port of Montevideo is the main port of the country.

Uruguay has a number of ports and harbors including: Montevideo (its major port), Fray Bentos, Nueva Palmira, Paysandú, La Paloma, Juan Lacaze, Carmelo, Conchillas, Salto, Punta del Este, Colonia del Sacramento, Piriápolis, Mercedes.

== Airports ==
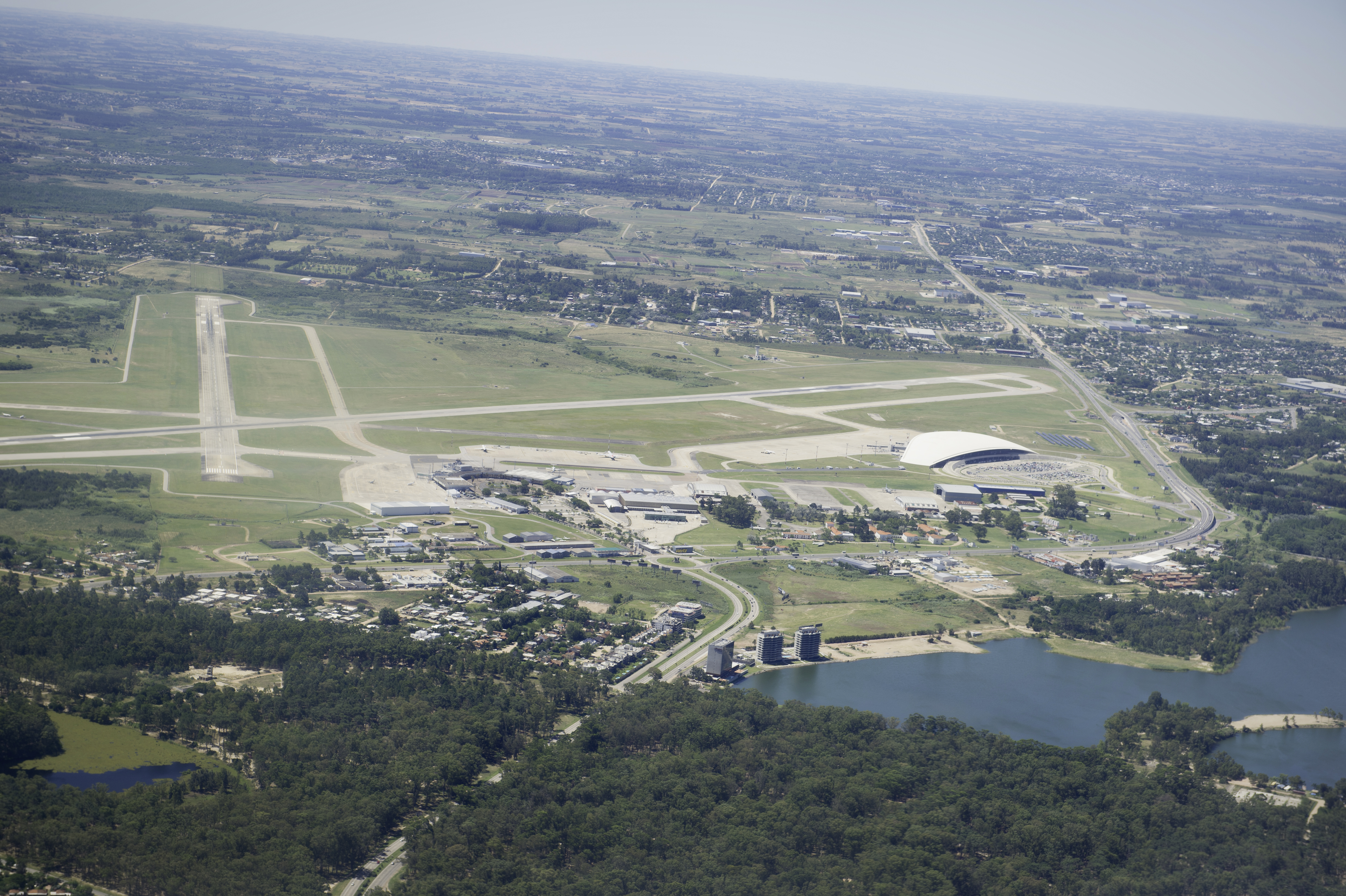
Aerial view of Carrasco International Airport, the most important airport in Uruguay.

Uruguay had a total of 94 airfields as of 2012, 11 of which have paved runways. The country is primarily served by the Carrasco International Airport in Canelones Department, near the border with Montevideo Department. Handing just over 1.5 million passengers a year, its operating traffic is significantly lighter than others in the region such as Buenos Aires-Ezeiza and São Paulo-Guarulhos.

Airports - with paved runways:
total: 11
over 3,047 m: 1
1,524 to 2,437 m: 4
914 to 1,523 m: 4
under 914 m: 2 (2013)

Airports - with unpaved runways:
total: 122
1,524 to 2,437 m: 3
914 to 1,523 m: 40
under 914 m: 79 (2013)

== National airlines ==
- Aeromás
- Air Class Líneas Aéreas

== Former airlines ==
- Uair ceased operation in 2005.
- PLUNA ceased operations on July 5, 2012.
- BQB Líneas Aéreas ceased operations on April 11, 2015.
- Alas Uruguay ceased operations on October 24, 2016.
- Amaszonas Uruguay ceased operations on January 21, 2021.

== Pipelines ==
As of 2010, Uruguay has 257 km of natural gas pipeline and 160 km of oil line.

== See also ==
- Rail transport by country
