= List of airlines of Uruguay =

This is a list of airlines of Uruguay.

== Active ==
Airline	Image	IATA	ICAO	Callsign	Founded	Notes
Aeromás		N3	MSM		1983	Charter/Cargo
Air Class Líneas Aéreas		VZ	QCL	ACLA	1996	Charter/Cargo
SUA Líneas Aéreas					2024	Planned to be Uruguay’s new flag carrier.

== Defunct ==
Airline	Image	IATA	ICAO	Callsign	Founded	Ceased operations	Notes
Aero Regionales					1994	1995	
Aero Uruguay		UO	AUO	UNIFORM OSCAR	1977	1991	
Aerolíneas Regionales Uruguayas			RAU	ARUSA	1993	1994	Renamed to Aero Regionales.
Aerolíneas Colonia		KO	AKO	ARCO	1957	1987	
Aerolíneas Uruguayas			AUY	AUSA	1990	2005	
Aerosur Uruguay			ASU	ASUR	1990	1993	
Atlántida Línea Aérea Sudamericana		HP			1976	1979	
Alas Uruguay		YZ	ALY		2013	2016	
Amaszonas Uruguay		Z7	AUZ	URUGUAYO	2015	2021	
Aviasur				AVIASUR	1995	1996	
Avinter		V3	VIN	AVINTER	2019	2019	Never launched.
Azul Uruguay					2017	2017	Formed by Azul Brazilian Airlines. Never launched.
BQB Líneas Aéreas		5Q	BQB		2010	2015	Assets taken by Amaszonas to create Amaszonas Uruguay.
Compañía Aeronáutica Uruguaya					1936	1967	
COTASA Taxi Aereo					1961	2004	
Linea Aerea Rio Platense					1961	1969	
PLUNA		PU	PUA	PLUNA	1936	2012	Liquidated. Former flag carrier.
Transcontinental Sur			TCT	TRANS-CONT	1992	2007	
Transporte Aéreo Militar Uruguayo				TAMU	1959	2003	
Uair		UE	EUU	EUROAMERICAN	2002	2005	

== See also ==
- List of airlines
- List of defunct airlines of the Americas
- List of airlines of the Americas
