= Lapsa =

Líneas Aéreas Platenses
IATA	ICAO	Call sign
-	-	-
- Hubs: Carrasco International Airport
- Fleet size: 3
- Destinations: 5
- Headquarters: Montevideo, Uruguay
- Key people: Juan Carlos Cousté (President)

Lapsa (Líneas Aéreas Platenses S.A.) was a regional airline based in Montevideo, Uruguay.

== Destinations ==
Argentina

- Buenos Aires

Uruguay

- Montevideo Hub
- Salto
- Colonia
- Punta del Este

== Fleet ==
Lapsa's fleet consisted of three Embraer EMB 120 Brasilia.

== See also ==
- List of defunct airlines of Uruguay
