= List of airlines of the Americas =

This is a list of airlines of the Americas, in operation.

== List of airlines ==
=== Anguilla ===
- Anguilla Air Services
- Trans Anguilla Airways

=== Aruba ===
- Aruba Airlines

=== Barbados ===
Barbados has no active airlines.

=== Belize ===
- Maya Island Air
- Tropic Air

=== Bermuda ===
- BermudAir
- Longtail Aviation

=== Bonaire ===
- Z Air
- Divi Divi Air

=== Clipperton Island ===
Clipperton Island has no active airlines.

=== Cuba ===
- Aerogaviota
- Cubana de Aviación

=== Curaçao ===
- Divi Divi Air

=== Dominica ===
Sunrise Airways Dominica

=== Falkland Islands ===
- British Antarctic Survey
- Falkland Islands Government Aviation Service

=== French Guiana ===
French Guiana has no active airlines.

=== Greenland ===
- Air Greenland

=== Grenada ===
Grenada has no active airlines.

=== Guadeloupe ===
- Air Guadeloupe
- Air Antilles
- Air Antilles Express
- Air Caraïbes

=== Haiti ===
- Sunrise Airways

=== Martinique ===
- Air Caraïbes
- Air Martinique
- Take Air

=== Montserrat ===
- FlyMontserrat

=== Navassa Island ===
Navassa Island has no active airlines.

=== Nicaragua ===
- La Costeña

=== Saba (island) ===
Saba has one active airline. Winair

=== Saint Barthélemy ===
- St Barth Commuter

=== Saint Kitts and Nevis ===
- Phoenix Airways

=== Saint Lucia ===
Saint Lucia has no airlines yet.

=== Collectivity of Saint Martin ===
Saint Martin has no airlines yet.

=== Saint Pierre and Miquelon ===
- Air Saint-Pierre

=== Saint Vincent and the Grenadines ===
- Air Adelphi
- Mustique Airways
- One Caribbean
- SVG Air

=== Sint Eustatius ===
Sint Eustatius has no active airlines.

=== Sint Maarten ===
- Winair
- Windward Express
- SXM Airways

=== South Georgia and the South Sandwich Islands ===
South Georgia and the South Sandwich Islands has no active airlines.

=== Trinidad and Tobago ===
- Caribbean Airlines

=== Turks and Caicos Islands ===
- Caicos Express Airways
- Global Airways
- InterCaribbean Airways

=== Uruguay ===
- Aeromás
- Air Class Líneas Aéreas
- SUA Líneas Aéreas

== See also ==
- List of airlines
- List of defunct airlines of the Americas
