= Cesáreo L. Berisso =

Uruguayan aviation pioneer

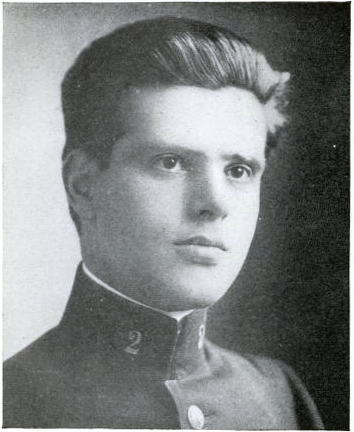
- Berisso in 1921
- Born: Cesáreo Leonardo Berisso Pascal; 6 November 1887; Montevideo, Uruguay
- Died: 28 August 1971 (aged 83); Montevideo, Uruguay
- Known for: First Uruguayan to perform a solo flight
- Aviation career
- First flight: 22 June 1913
- Air force: Uruguayan Air Force
- Rank: General

Cesáreo Leonardo Berisso Pascal (6 November 1887 – 28 July 1971) was a Uruguayan aviation pioneer and general who was the first Uruguayan to perform a solo flight.

A dominant figure in early Uruguayan aviation, Berisso was one of the first Uruguayans to attend an aviation school and in 1913 he performed his first solo flight - the first of any Uruguayan. When the school at Los Cerrillos closed, he was sent by the government to Argentina to continue developing his aviation skills. He won the first international air race in the Americas in 1916 and in 1917 became the first Uruguayan to cross the Río de la Plata in a hot air balloon. Berisso became an instructor at the Military School of Aeronautics in Uruguay and later its director from 1922 to 1931, and again from 1946 to 1947. In his aviation career, he flew flights to multiple South American countries and crossed the Andes numerous times. His most ambitious flight, Montevideo to New York, ended in failure in 1929 when he and his crew crashed into the Colombian jungle.

A general in the Uruguayan army, Berisso served on several government commissions including one tasked with determining the location of a Carrasco Airport that was renamed in his honour in 1994.

== Early and personal life ==
Berisso was born in Piedras Blancas, Montevideo, the son of Cesáreo Berisso and Mariana Pascal, on 6 November 1887. His father served as the Civil Governor of Canelones. Berisso married Ana Isidra Viera on 21 July 1915 and together they had seven children: María Isolda, María Teresa, César Leónidas, Felicianos Luis Ana María, Rivera, and Artigas. Berisso was characterized in his life as a calm and serious individual.

== Aviation career ==
=== Aviation training ===
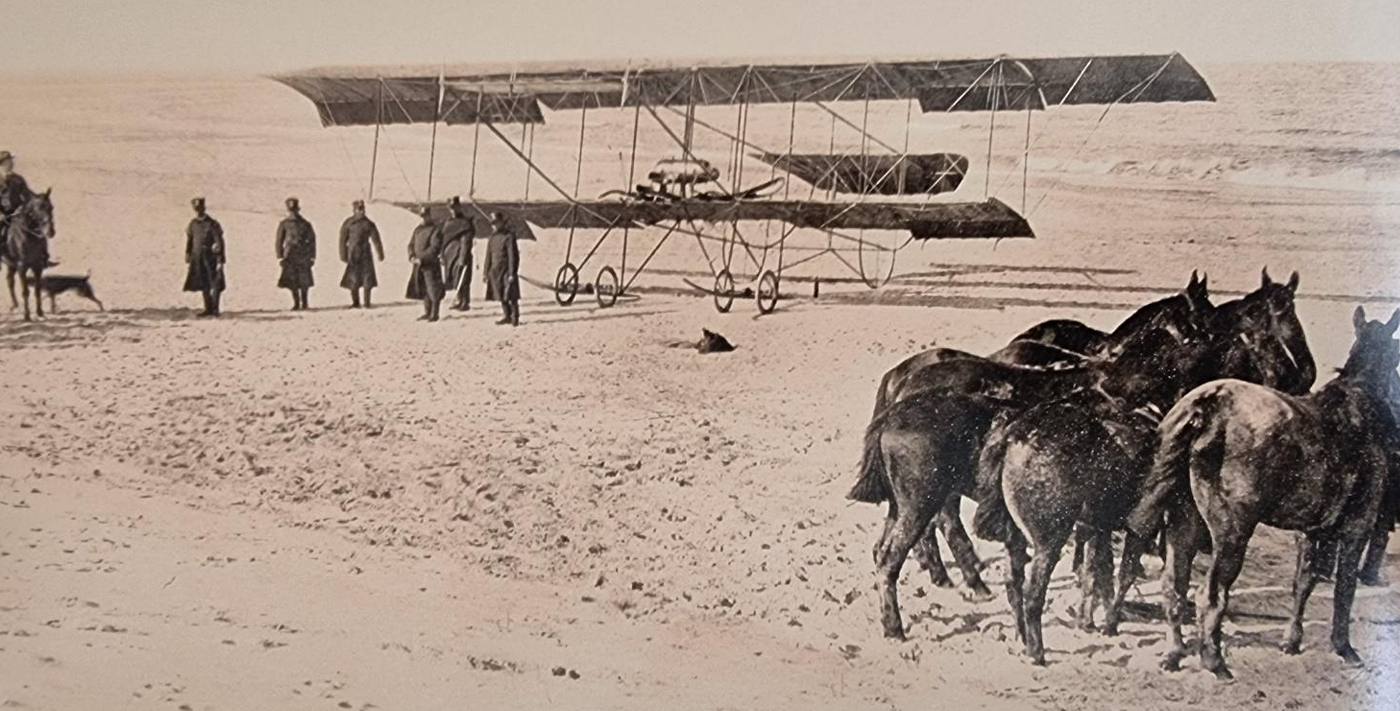
El Aguila after landing at Playa Malvín on 22 June 1913, piloted by Berisso.

Berisso was part of the first group of students to attend the Military Aviation School at Los Cerrillos established on 17 March 1913. He initially had the rank of ensign and was trained by French instructor Marcel Paillette. On 22 June 1913, he carried out the first solo flight by a Uruguayan, flying from Cerrillos to Playa Malvín in 1 hour and 45 minutes in a Farman aircraft called El Aguila. Boiso Lanza, a friend of Berisso, attempted to follow him but was held back. It was the only solo flight performed at the school as in the same month, the aviation school was closed when the Ministry of War and Navy failed to renewal its contract with Paillette. However, Berisso and nine others still graduated.

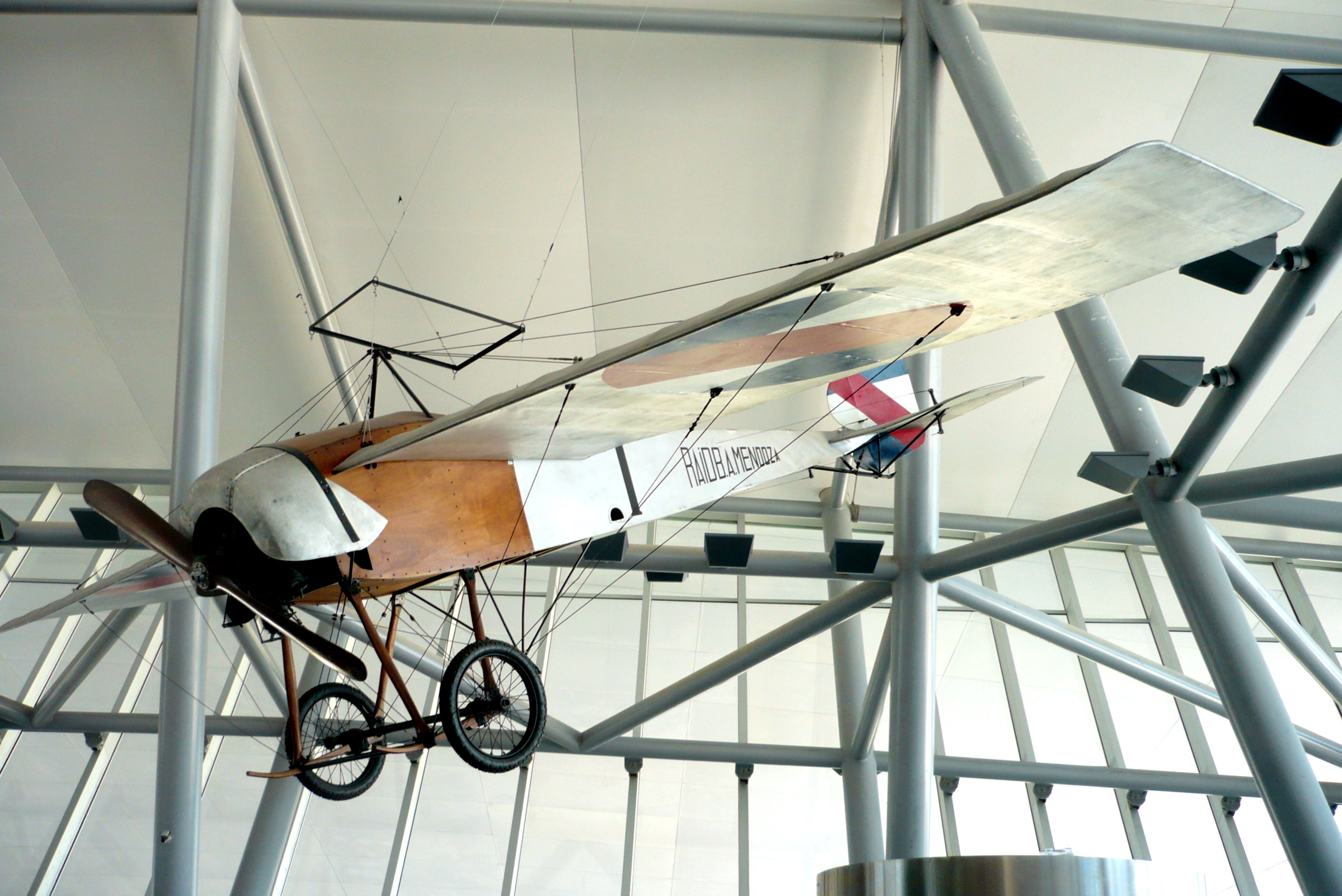
The restored Castaibert aircraft Berisso won the 1916 Buenos Aires-Mendoza race on display at Carrasco Airport, as viewed in 2011.

Wishing to continue the development of aviation in Uruguay, the government assigned Berisso and Esteban Christi to flight training courses in Argentina. Military Bulletin No. 4202 of the Argentine Army, issued 19 July 1915, authorized their admission. The two Uruguayans were taught by Pedro Zanni and pursued military aviator diplomas. Berisso sustained serious injuries and was admitted to a military hospital after a Blériot aircraft he was flying in crashed on 27 May 1916. He soon recovered and represented Uruguay at the first multinational Latin American air race held on 17 to 19 July 1916 where he bet his Argentine and Chilean opponents in flying from Buenos Aires to Mendoza. The flight was completed in a Castaibert aircraft. After the plane was retired in December 1919, it was later restored and placed on display at Carrasco International Airport. On July 27, the Argentine government granted Berisso the title of Senior Military Aviator.

A requirement for the aviator diploma in Argentina was the completion of ballooning activities at day and night. On May 11, 1917, he - now a First Lieutenant - became the first Uruguayan to cross the Río de la Plata in a hot air balloon. The aerostat was named Teniente Agneta (Lieutenant Agneta, after Argentine aviation pioneer Alfredo Agneta), and travelled from Buenos Aires to Sierras de Mal Abrigo in Uruguay's San Jose Department. The trip lasted 5 hours and 10 minutes. Teniente Agneta was owned by the Aero Club Argentino and built by Ernani Mazzoleni, with its first ascent being 19 September 1915. Berisso, however, failed to obtain the diploma as he was assigned to the United States in July, preventing him from taking the night ballooning test. Before departing for the U.S., he flew another Farman also named El Aguila on 11 July 1917 from El Palomar to Montevideo across the Río de la Plata, the first to do so in a biplane. He had oversaw its construction in Argentina on behalf of the Uruguayan government. In the U.S., Berisso was tasked with observing and studying the country's more advanced aviation by taking flight courses and studying different aircraft.

=== Directorship and more South American flights ===
In November 1916, the Military School of Aeronautics in Pando, Uruguay, was established as the successor to the Military Aviation School. Berisso taught at the school as an instructor alongside Christi and Adhemar Saenz Lacneva. He later became the school's director from 4 May 1922 to 24 June 1931. Twenty-seven students graduated in that time. Berisso became the director again from 19 September 1946 to 24 November 1947. In 1920, money was raised for Berisso to acquire an Avro aircraft.

Concurrent to his directorship, Berisso continued flying. In 1921, he flew from Montevideo to Rocha on Uruguay's eastern coast. He completed another flight across the Río de la Plata between Montevideo and Buenos Aires in 1922. In 1925, Berisso envisioned flying across the Southern Cone of South America. The planned route was from Montevideo to Asunción in Paraguay, then to Rosario in Argentina, followed by Santiago then Valparaíso in Chile, Mendoza and Buenos Aires, and finishing by returning to Montevideo. Accompanied by Dagoberto Molí - a mechanic - Berisso departed from Montevideo on April 5 in a Breguet 14. The pair were met with celebration upon landing in Asunción from Paraguayan army officers, who expressed feelings of camaraderie between Paraguay and Uruguay, and also to Chile. However, the journey was cut short by poor weather conditions preventing safe passage across the Andes. Chile was thus removed from the route as they flew to Mendoza and then unto Montevideo via Buenos Aires. The pair landed in Montevideo on April 12, having travelled 4,500 kilometres (2,800 mi) over 32 hours spent in flight.

=== Attempted Montevideo to New York flight ===
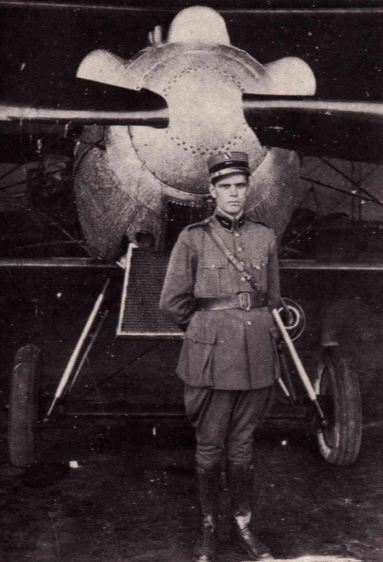
Berisso in 1943.

Berisso left from the Pando Aerodrome on the outskirts of Montevideo on 17 March 1929 with the intention of reaching New York City in the U.S. accompanied by Molí and Rogelio Otero. The aircraft used was a Breguet 14, but many modifications were made to improve its suitability, and it was the first aircraft built entirely in Uruguay. Only the engine was made outside Uruguay from France. Most importantly, the fuel tanks were improved to allow it to carry at least 2,500 liters (660 U.S. gal) of fuel. The plane was named Montevideo. Berisso planned to follow South America's Pacific coast and make a total of 14 stops when travelling the 14,238 kilometres (8,847 mi) with an estimated 87 hours of flight time. They arrived in Buenos Aires with only a minor defect. The next leg was a non-stop flight to Santiago. Unlike in 1925, the trio managed to cross the Andes and land in Santiago where they were greeted by the Uruguayan ambassador Eugenio Martínez Thedy. Molí later remarked that crossing the Andes was calmer than what they all thought. This was the first non-stop flight between the two cities. From Santiago, they flew to Antofagasta then Arica. Air pressure differences when flying over the Atacama Desert caused the Montevideo to frequently shake. Despite that, they managed to land safely in Lima in Peru on March 27, and progressed to Tumbes in Peru's north.

From Tumbes, the trio planned to land next in Cali in Colombia. By following a straight line, this necessitated travelling inland. When they crossed Ecuador, thick clouds obscured the crew's visibility of the land. When they were about to begin flying over Colombia, they noticed smoke coming from one of the engines as an oil pump within stopped working, causing the engine to overheat and catch fire. The crew were without parachutes and had little knowledge of where they were, but Berisso began an emergency landing to avoid burning in the sky. Once they descended through the clouds, they noticed they were surrounded by jungle but that there was a clearing Berisso steered the Montevideo towards. Berisso's landing avoided flipping over the plane, but the clearing was too short and soon the plane crashed into a tree. The impact threw all three out of the plane. Otero was unscathed and Berisso suffered minor injuries when he hit his head. Molí, however, suffered the most as he fractured a hip joint and could not walk. All the fuel left in the plane meant the Montevideo exploded before any items could be rescued.

The clearing was near an indigenous village on a river. The commotion generated by the crash caused the villagers to flee in a panic, and Berisso proposed taking one of their canoes. They, however, decided to wait until the villagers returned to avoid conflict. When they reappeared, they spoke barely any Spanish but understood the word amigo (friend). Berisso and Otero were received by the tribal chief who gave them a canoe. The trio planned to travel the river until it met with the Pacific. The slow journey lasted for 2 days. They were accompanied by a group of natives who offered mashed and cooked bananas, but the trio decided they rather go hungry than eat food made in such poor hygiene. When they arrived at a village called Terembi they needed to disembark and find new canoes. Otero spoke to a man known to the villagers as hermanito (little brother) - an escaped prisoner pretending to be a priest wearing a cassock - who gave the trio new canoes and joined the journey. At the river's mouth was the town of Tumaco. The crew stayed in Tumaco for a month to allow Molí to recover and helped hermanito get released when he was arrested by police. They then returned to Montevideo.

=== 1935 Montevideo to Lima flight ===
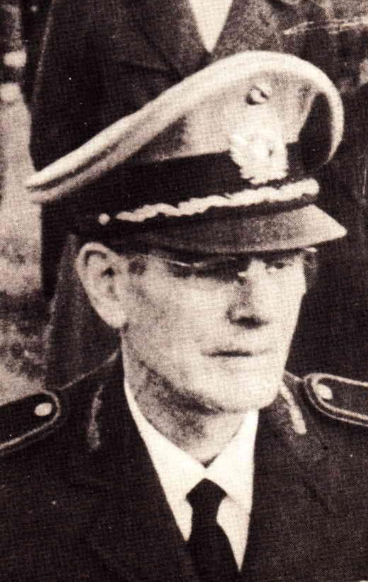
Berisso as a general in 1946.

Berisso departed from Montevideo on 19 January 1935 with the goal of reaching Lima in a Potez 25 accompanied by Edgardo Ubaldo Genta. They made stops at Buenos Aires, Villa Mercedes and Mendoza, and crossed the Andes through Uspallata Pass to land at Santiago. They followed the Pacific coast and made stops at Copiapó, Antofagasta and reached Arica on January 21. The next day they landed in Lima where they were met with celebrations until they left on January 27. On the return journey, they largely followed the same route. However, they ran out of fuel before they could reach Santiago and Berriso was forced to land in the Quillota valley. The camanchaca kept them grounded until February 4, but they received accommodation from a local estate. Despite poor weather when crossing the Andes, they safely reached Mendoza and landed in Montevideo on February 5. In total, they spent 64 hours in flight.

=== Involvement in commissions ===
Berisso was appointed to a commission on 9 August 1938 to survey where a national airport should be built. The commission issued a report on 2 October 1939 suggesting four possible locations, including Carrasco where the airport ultimately was built. When the first runway of Carrasco Airport was completed in 1944, Berisso was the first to land there. Berisso flew a Fairchild PT-19 aircraft with Alcides Luzuriaga and landed on September 19.

On the issue of which day the Uruguayan Air Force should be commemorated on, Berisso submitted a letter on 14 October 1947 proposing November 15 as the date He went on to elaborate more in another letter dated to October 24 that November 15 was the date the Military School of Aeronautics was established. In 1963, on the 50th anniversary of Berisso's first flight, a re-enactment was held with Berisso as a passenger.

== Military career ==
Berisso served in the National Army of Uruguay from 1 January 1904 to November the same year. He re-entered the military on 17 February 1907 and attended the Escuela Militar del Uruguay until 1911 where he was trained as a cadet. He was made an alférez at the end of his training on 26 December 1911. In the subsequent years, Berisso was promoted through the ranks: second lieutenant on 1 June 1915, first lieutenant on 7 February 1917, captain on 23 January 1919, and major on 2 February 1922. On 16 February 1925 he was made an lieutenant colonel by vote and qualified by seniority to colonel on 3 April 1934. He was given his highest rank, general, on 1 February 1944.

As major he was a member of the Commission for Curriculum Plans for Army Schools from 1923 and 1926, followed then by his time as a member of the General Council of Military Education. In 1938, he was made head of a commission responsible for drafting laws on aeronautical legislation. Berisso served as a member of various other commissions related to military aviation in the 1930s and 1940s. On 19 September 1946, Berisso was named Director General of Military Aeronautics but retired from military activity on 24 November 1947. He continued to involve himself in civilian aviation, and served as President of PLUNA (Uruguay's flag carrier) in 1951.

== Legacy ==
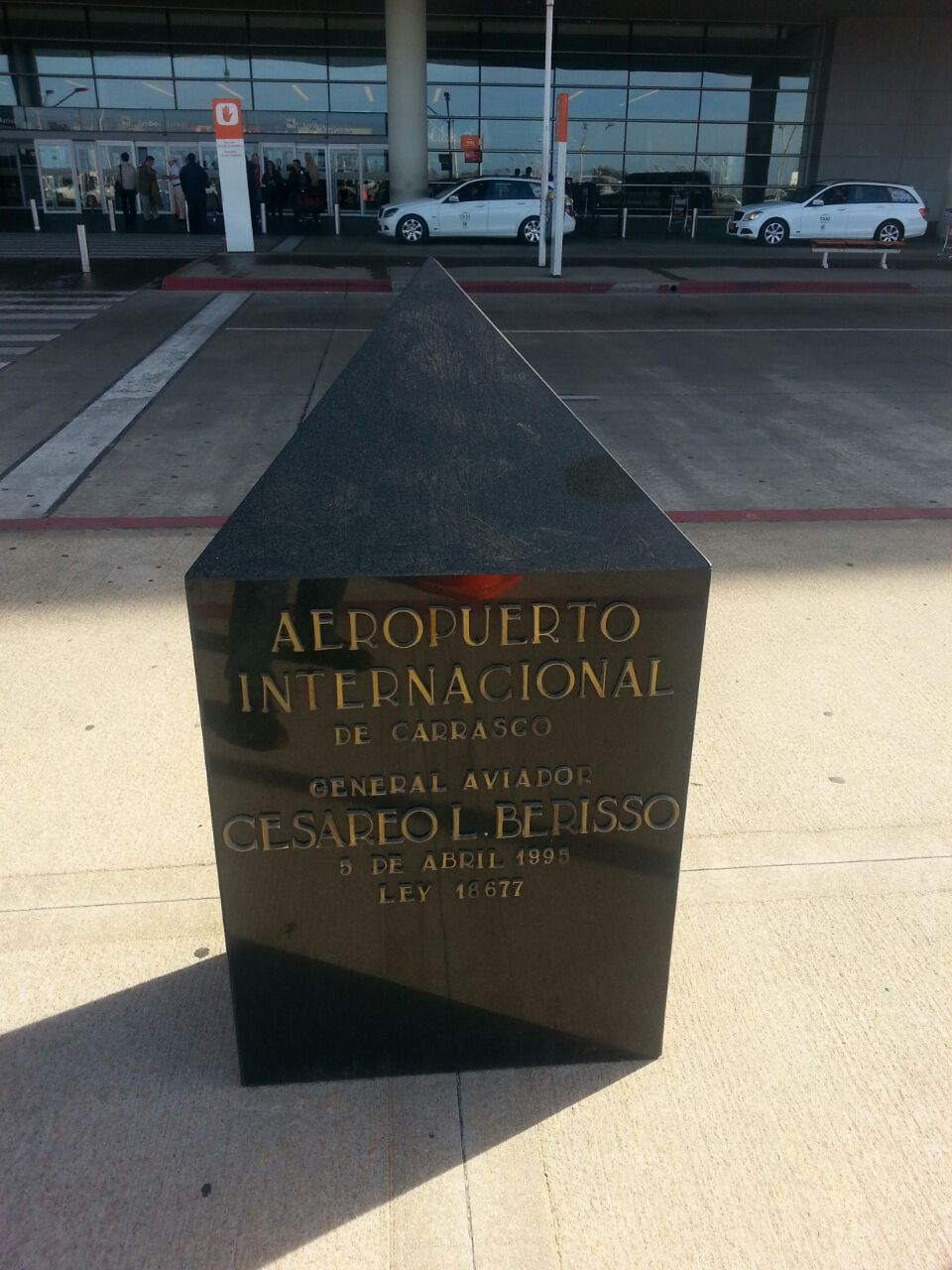
Monolith dedicated to Berisso's memory outside Carrasco Airport.

Berisso died aged 83 in Montevideo on 28 July 1971.

Eduardo Mazzucchelli, a member of the Uruguayan Academy of Aeronautical History and advisor to the National Directorate of Civil Aviation and Aeronautical Infrastructure, described Berisso in 2021 as "one of the promoters of Uruguayan and international aviation" who was an "ideologue of a future."

In 1974, the Cesáreo Berisso Foundation was established as a not-for-profit organisation named in his honour that seeks to provide support to air force personnel and their families, with a particular focus on supporting their children.

Carrasco International Airport, Uruguay's main international airport, was opened in 1947. In 1994, it was renamed the Carrasco/General Cesáreo L. Berisso International Airport in Berisso's honour. A small monolith was also erected at the airport's entrance to pay tribute to him. In both 2017 and 2021, the Colorado Party presented bills attempting to name the passenger terminal in honour of former President Jorge Batlle which would relegate Berisso's name to the cargo terminal. The party tried again in 2023 but failed to gain support from other political parties who wished to continue to use the airport as a way to honour Berisso. The airport also includes a small museum dedicated to Berisso.

The Uruguayan Air Force's military base in Canelones Department, Base Aérea General Cesáreo Berisso, was established in 1947 and was renamed in Berisso's honour on 1 December 1994.
