= 2012 Air Class Líneas Aéreas Fairchild Swearingen Metroliner crash =

2012 Uruguayan Aviation Accident

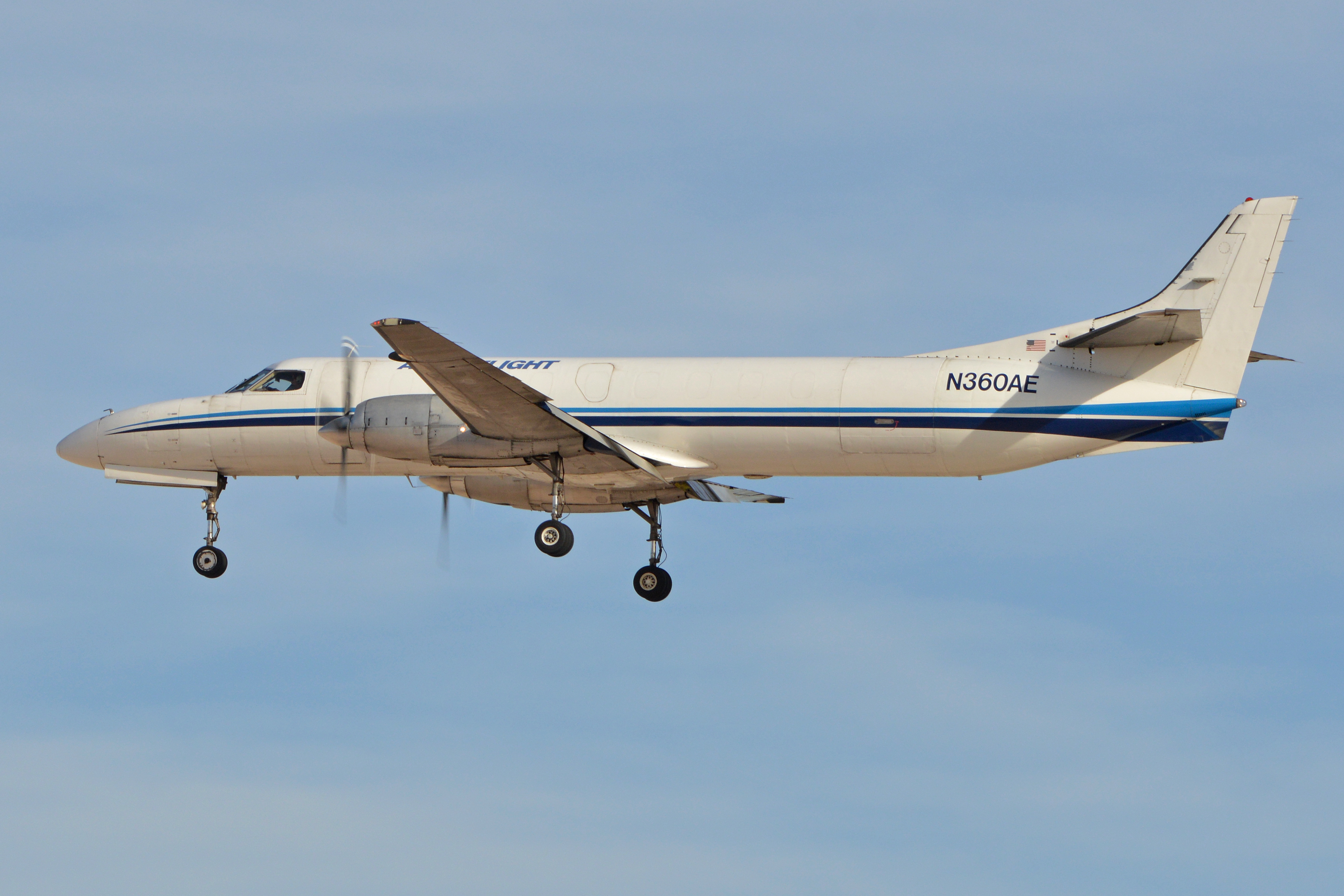
- A Swearingen SA227-AC Metro III similar to the one involved in the accident

Accident
- Date: June 6, 2012
- Summary: Loss of control due to erroneous indications from flight instruments, causing loss of situational awareness of the pilots.
- Site: Río de la Plata, 2km southwest of Isla de Flores, Uruguay; 34°57′27″S 55°56′42″W
- Approximate location of the crash

Aircraft
- Aircraft type: Fairchild Swearingen SA227-AC Metro III
- Operator: Air Class Líneas Aéreas, on behalf of DHL
- Call sign: CX-LAS
- Registration: CX-LAS
- Flight origin: Carrasco International Airport, Montevideo, Uruguay
- Destination: Ministro Pistarini International Airport, Buenos Aires, Argentina
- Occupants: 2
- Passengers: 0
- Crew: 2
- Fatalities: 2
- Survivors: 0

On 6 June 2012, an Air Class Líneas Aéreas Fairchild Metroliner cargo aircraft crashed near Isla de Flores, Uruguay shortly after takeoff from Montevideo Airport, carrying freight for DHL. Both of its occupants perished. Its wreckage was missing for over a month until a scuba diver located it 2 km southwest of the Isla de Flores.

== Aircraft and crew ==
The aircraft was a Fairchild Swearingen SA227-AC Metro III, registered CX-LAS built in 1981. At the time of the accident the airframe had a total of 26,158 flight hours.

The pilots and only occupants in the plane were 63 year old capitan Walter Rigo, who had over 16,000 flight hours and 34 year old first officer Martín Riva, who had 406 flight hours.

== Accident ==
The flight departed Montevideo Airport's runway 24 at about 19:55 local time. During its climb to flight level 080 (FL80), the flight conducted a left turn. The controller contacted the flight, and shortly after the pilots answered that they would change course to the SARGO Waypoint. Just after that exchange, the flight crashed into the waters of the Rio de la Plata, killing both pilots.

=== Search ===
The Uruguayan Air Force and Navy started the search for the aircraft after the loss of contact with the flight. After multiple weeks, 50% of the search area had been covered, but neither the wreckage nor the pilots had been found. On 20 July 2012 the crash site was found. It was located about 2 km southwest of Isla de Flores. The aircraft wreckage covered an area of about 90 meters in radius, and the aircraft's black box was retrieved for investigation. Although most parts of the aircraft were recovered, the bodies of the pilots were never found.

== Investigation and conclusions ==
The Uruguayan Aviation Accidents and Incidents Investigation Commission, part of the ministry of national defence, headed the investigation. According to their report, the aircraft impacted the water at an angle of about 88º nose down at a speed of 1027 km/h or about 554 knots.

The report mentions that the main contributing factors for the crash were; an omission from the crew of a passage by the meteorological Office to collect information on the weather situation, the omission or erroneous execution of some checklists and the fact that the instruments powered by 115 Volts AC were not energized, which put together make the probable cause of the accident a loss of control due to erroneous indications from flight instruments, causing loss of situational awareness of the pilots.
