= SUA Líneas Aéreas =

Proposed Uruguayan airline

- Founded: 28 January 2024; 2 years ago
- Hubs: Carrasco International Airport
- Destinations: 16
- Headquarters: Montevideo, Uruguay
- Key people: Antonio Rama (Founder and CEO)
- Website: flysua.com

SUA Líneas Aéreas (also known as Sociedad Uruguaya de Aviación) is a proposed airline set to be the new flag carrier of Uruguay.

== History ==
The airline was officially presented on January 28, 2024 in Madrid, Spain by Uruguayan commander Antonio Rama, who previously founded the former low-cost Uair.

SUA has established a strategic alliance with Latvian airline airBaltic to operate up to five Airbus A220-300 aircraft on a wet-lease basis out of Carrasco International Airport. This collaboration will allow SUA to be the first airline in South America and the Caribbean to operate this aircraft model. SUA aims to connect Uruguay directly to major South American cities, boost regional tourism and to fill the void left by Pluna since its collapse in 2012.

== See also ==
- List of airlines of Uruguay
