= Aero Uruguay =

Cargo airline based in Montevideo, Uruguay

IATA	ICAO	Call sign
UO	AUO	UNIFORM OSCAR
- Founded: July 26, 1977
- Commenced operations: November 1977
- Ceased operations: June 1991
- Hubs: Carrasco International Airport
- Parent company: Cargolux
- Headquarters: Montevideo, Uruguay
- Key people: Col. Atilio Bonelli

Empresa Aerolineas Uruguay S.A. (also known as Aero Uruguay) was a cargo airline that was based at Carrasco International Airport at Montevideo, Uruguay. It was founded on July 26, 1977, by Cargolux, which was looking to expand its operations in South America.

== Fleet ==
Aero Uruguay had a fleet of the following aircraft.

Aero Uruguay fleet
Aircraft	Total	Introduced	Retired	Notes
Boeing 707-320C	2	1978	1991	
Canadair CL-44	3	1977	1978	Leased from Cargolux.
Douglas DC-8-55CF	1	1986	1989	
Douglas DC-8-63CF	1	1981	1982	Leased from Cargolux.
Fokker F-27	1	1988	1990	

== See also ==
- List of airlines of Uruguay
