= BQB Líneas Aéreas =

Uruguayan airline

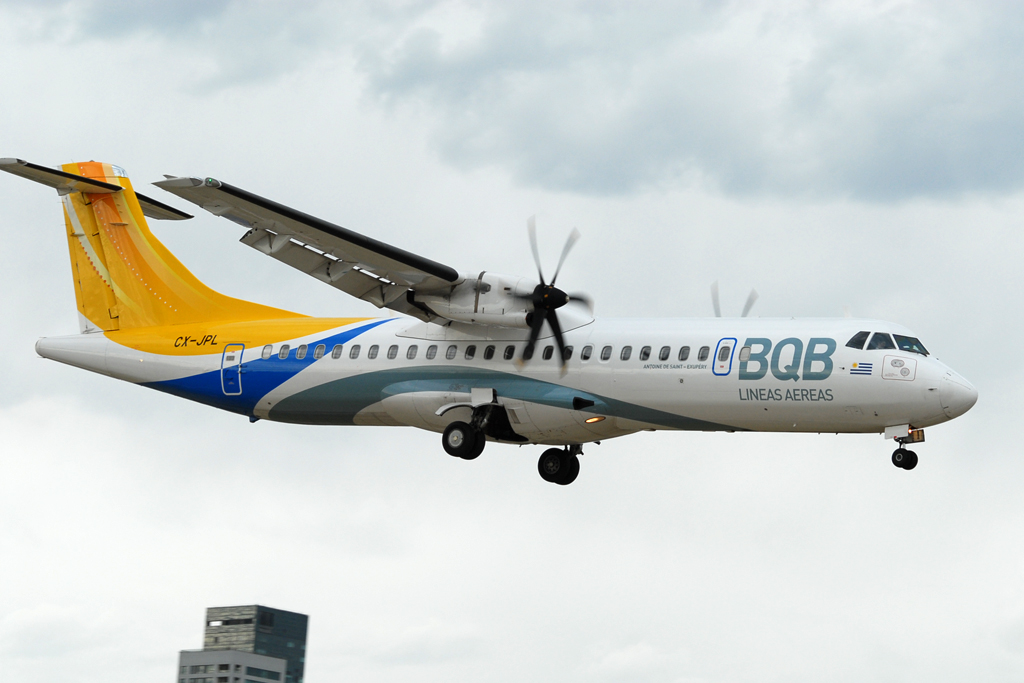
- A BQB ATR-72-500 seen landing at Aeroparque Jorge Newbery in 2011.
IATA	ICAO	Call sign
5Q	BQB	-
- Founded: 2010
- Ceased operations: 11 April 2015
- Hubs: Carrasco International Airport
- Fleet size: 3
- Destinations: 3
- Parent company: Línea Aérea Amaszonas
- Headquarters: Montevideo, Uruguay
- Key people: Juan Carlos López Mena (CEO)
- Website: www.flybqb.com

BQB Líneas Aéreas (legally Los Cipreses S. A.) was an airline based in Montevideo, Uruguay. Its main base was Carrasco International Airport. The airline was owned by the owner of Buquebus, Juan Carlos López Mena. The airline ceased operations in April 2015.

== History ==
Routes that were approved: Montevideo, Uruguay (home base) to Rosario, Córdoba, and Buenos Aires, Argentina, Asunción, Paraguay, Porto Alegre and Florianópolis, Brazil. From Buenos Aires to Salto, Uruguay. Due to delays in government approvals and changes international routes were still pending when BQB ceased operations during April 2015, however BQB commenced ATR 72 domestic service from Montevideo to the cities of Salto twice a week (Mondays and Fridays) and the city of Rivera three times a week (Mondays-Wednesdays and Fridays) as a discount carrier and in competition with the bus service. These frequencies were expected to be increased. Others that were expected to commence included the routes from Montevideo to Rivera to Porto Alegre, Porto Alegre to Punta del Este, and from Salto to Buenos Aires.

On 11 April 2015, the airline ceased operations due to a crisis that began in 2014, being sold 5 days later to the Bolivian Línea Aérea Amaszonas. A month later, Amaszonas formed a new subsidiary with BQB's assets called Amaszonas Uruguay.

== Destinations ==
By April 2015, BQB Líneas Aéreas operated scheduled services to the following destinations:

City	Country	Airport	Status
Argentina	Buenos Aires	Aeroparque Jorge Newbery	
Argentina	Buenos Aires	Ministro Pistarini International Airport	Terminated
Argentina	Rosario	Rosario – Islas Malvinas International Airport	Terminated
Brazil	Curitiba	Afonso Pena International Airport	Terminated
Brazil	Florianópolis	Hercílio Luz International Airport	Terminated
Brazil	Foz do Iguaçu	Foz do Iguaçu International Airport	Terminated
Brazil	Porto Alegre	Salgado Filho International Airport	Terminated
Brazil	Rio de Janeiro	Rio de Janeiro–Galeão International Airport	Terminated
Brazil	São Paulo	São Paulo–Guarulhos International Airport	Terminated
Chile	Santiago	Arturo Merino Benítez International Airport	Terminated
Paraguay	Asunción	Silvio Pettirossi International Airport	
Uruguay	Montevideo	Carrasco International Airport	Hub
Uruguay	Punta del Este	Capitán de Corbeta Carlos A. Curbelo International Airport	Terminated
Uruguay	Rivera	Rivera International Airport	Terminated
Uruguay	Salto	Nueva Hesperides International Airport	Terminated

== Fleet ==
BQB's fleet consisted of the following aircraft:

BQB Líneas Aéreas fleet
Aircraft	Total	Introduced	Retired	Notes
Airbus A319-100	1	2014	2015	Leased from Airbus
Airbus A320-200	1	2013	2014	Leased from Vueling
ATR 72-500	4	2010	2015	

== See also ==
- List of defunct airlines of Uruguay
