= Línea Aérea Amaszonas =

Bolivian airline

Amaszonas
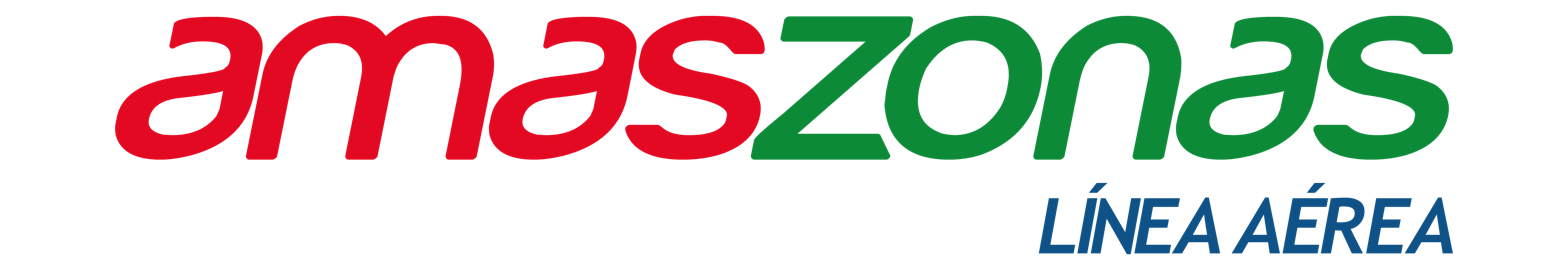

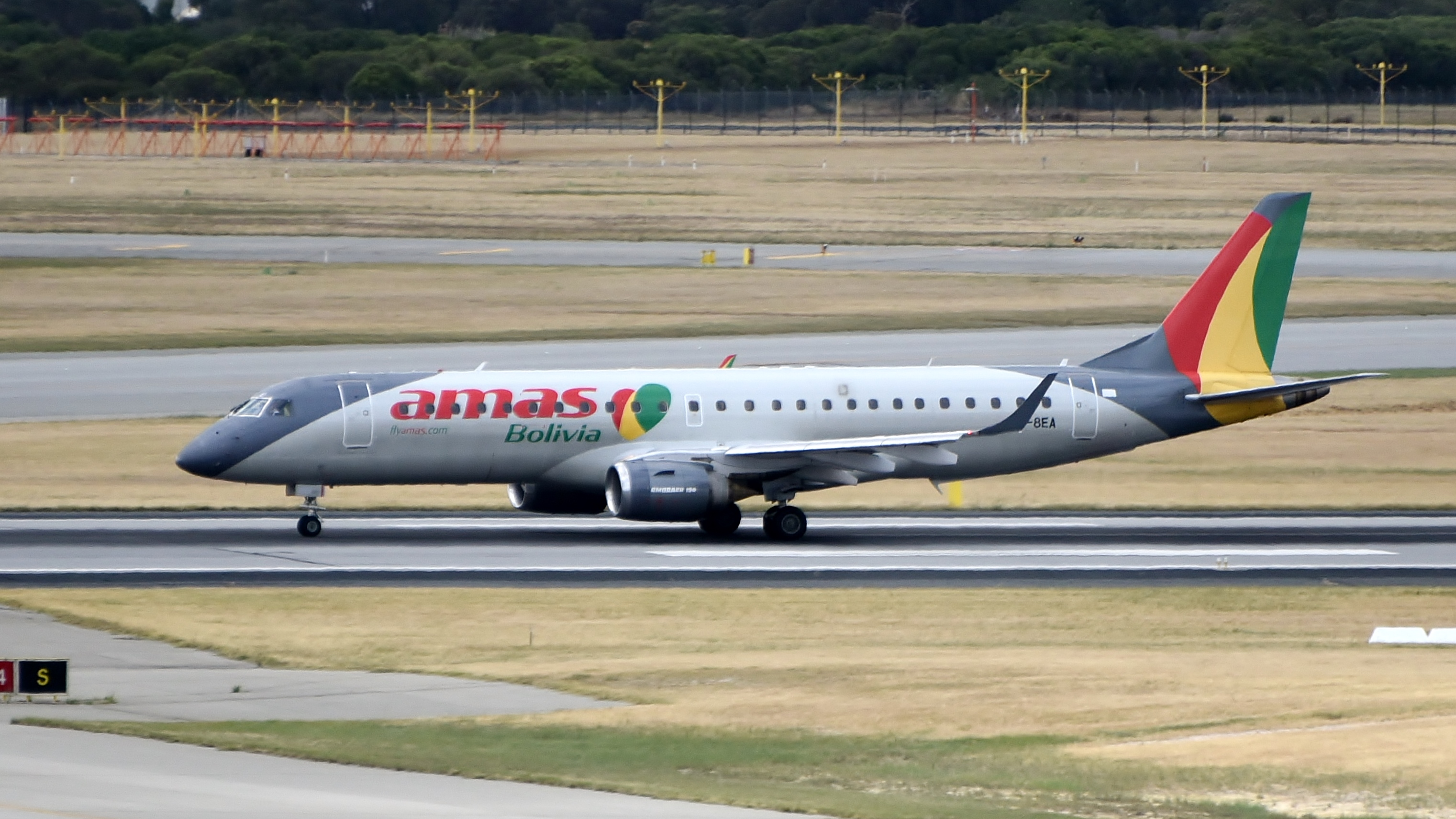
IATA	ICAO	Call sign
Z8	AZN	AMASZONAS
- Founded: October 1, 1998
- Commenced operations: 2000
- Ceased operations: August 8, 2023
- AOC #: 791F491F
- Hubs: El Alto International Airport
- Focus cities: Viru Viru International Airport
- Frequent-flyer program: AmasMiles
- Subsidiaries: Amaszonas Paraguay (2015-2018); Amaszonas Uruguay (2016-2021)
- Fleet size: 3
- Destinations: 6
- Headquarters: Santa Cruz de la Sierra, Bolivia
- Key people: Luis Divino (Owner); Mauricio Souza (CEO)
- Website: www.amaszonas.com

Línea Aérea Amaszonas S.A. (Note: The name "Amaszonas" is a pun on the Spanish term "A más zonas", which means "to more zones". The pronunciation is nearly identical to "Amazonas", Spanish for the Amazon River, whose drainage basin covers northeastern Bolivia.) later operating as Amas Bolivia (legally as Compañía de Servicios de Transporte Aéreo Amaszonas S.A.) was a regional airline based in Bolivia, headquartered in Santa Cruz de la Sierra with its administrative center in La Paz. It operated scheduled and chartered short-haul passenger flights throughout the northern and northeastern regions of the country as well as to neighboring Brazil, Argentina, Peru, Chile and Paraguay, with its network's hub that was located at El Alto International Airport. It was acquired by NELLA Airlines Group (a Brazilian-US holding company) in August 2021 and sold to businessman Luiz Divino in September 2023.

== History ==
The company was founded on October 1, 1998, with operations commencing in 2000. Initially, Amaszonas operated chartered flights using a small fleet of Cessna 208 Caravan and Fairchild Swearingen Metroliner turboprop aircraft. In 2012, following the demise of AeroSur, five Bombardier CRJ200 were acquired from Avmax Aircraft Leasing Inc. to launch scheduled passenger services. The first one of these 50-seat jet aircraft was put in service in late August on the La Paz-Santa Cruz de la Sierra route.

In late 2014, Amaszonas announced it would lease nine CRJ200 aircraft to expand its regional network and intended to fly to up to 40 destinations by 2017.

In 2015, Amaszonas purchased the Uruguayan airline BQB Líneas Aéreas, five days after the company shut down its operations due to a crisis that began in 2014. From May 4, the airline took over the routes operated by BQB before the closure of operations, which were Aeroparque Jorge Newbery and Silvio Pettirossi International Airport.

In August 2021, Nella Linhas Aéreas, a Brazilian-based company registered in the U.S., acquired 100% control over Amaszonas. Nella announced a strategic partnership with Boeing on July 29, 2021, expecting the delivery of a Boeing 737-500 in August, but it never happened.

On August 8, 2023, Amaszonas temporarily suspended its operations after a dispute with its aircraft's lessor and the Bolivian government. By the following month, Nella ended up selling the airline to businessman Luis Divino.

On November 19, 2023, the General Directorate of Civil Aeronautics announced that Amaszonas' air operator's certificate was suspended, effectively ending their ability to operate and earn revenue.

== Destinations ==
By August 2023, Amaszonas offered scheduled flights to the following destinations:

City	Country	Airport	Status
Argentina	Buenos Aires	Aeroparque Jorge Newbery	Terminated
Bolivia	Cochabamba	Jorge Wilstermann International Airport	
Bolivia	La Paz	El Alto International Airport	Hub
Bolivia	Oruro	Juan Mendoza Airport	Terminated
Bolivia	Rurrenabaque	Rurrenabaque Airport	Terminated
Bolivia	Santa Cruz de la Sierra	Viru Viru International Airport	Focus city
Bolivia	Sucre	Alcantarí Airport	
Bolivia	Sucre	Juana Azurduy de Padilla International Airport	Terminated
Bolivia	Tarija	Capitán Oriel Lea Plaza Airport	Terminated
Bolivia	Trinidad	Teniente Jorge Henrich Arauz Airport	Terminated
Bolivia	Uyuni	Uyuni Airport	Terminated
Bolivia	Yacuiba	Yacuiba Airport	Terminated
Bolivia	Cobija	Captain Aníbal Arab Airport	Terminated
Bolivia	Santa Ana del Yacuma	Santa Ana del Yacuma Airport	Terminated
Chile	Iquique	Diego Aracena International Airport	
Paraguay	Asunción	Silvio Pettirossi International Airport	
Paraguay	Ciudad del Este	Guaraní International Airport	Terminated
Peru	Arequipa	Rodriguez Ballon International Airport	Terminated
Peru	Cusco	Alejandro Velasco Astete International Airport	Terminated
Uruguay	Montevideo	Carrasco International Airport	Terminated
Uruguay	Punta del Este	Capitán de Corbeta Carlos A. Curbelo International Airport	Terminated

=== Interline agreements ===
As of April 2014, Amaszonas had interline agreement with the following airlines:

- Air Europa
- Gol Linhas Aéreas Inteligentes

By January 2022, only Air Europa maintained an E-Ticket interlineal agreement which allowed the airlines to use the KIU System (Amadeus) to generate reservations in the domestic destination served by Amaszonas.

== Fleet ==
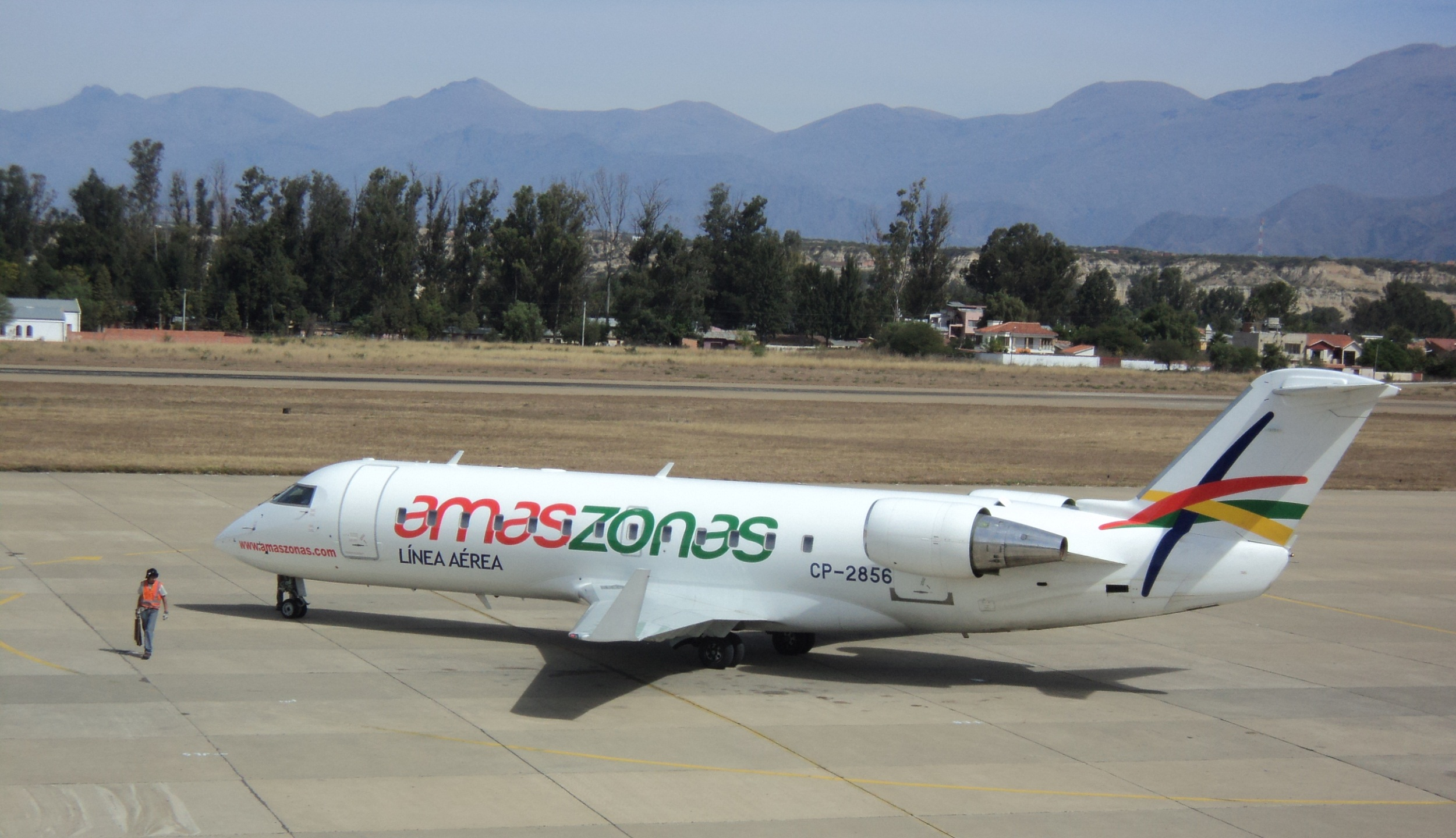
Amaszonas Bombardier CRJ200 at Capitán Oriel Lea Plaza Airport in 2014

The airline's fleet previously operated the following aircraft:

Aircraft	Total	Introduced	Retired	Notes
Bombardier CRJ-100LR	1	2015	2016	
Bombardier CRJ-200LR	8	2012	2022	
Cessna 208B Grand Caravan	3	2000	2008	
De Havilland Canada Dash 8-200	2	2017	2023	
Embraer 190	6	2019	2023	
Fairchild Swearingen Metroliner	3	2004	2018	

== Incidents ==
- On July 10, 2001, at 16:47 local time, the two pilots of an Amaszonas Cessna 208 Caravan (registered CP-2395) carrying eleven passengers had to execute an emergency landing on a hill near Viacha, six minutes into a flight from La Paz to Rurrenabaque, due to an engine problem. When hitting the ground, the aircraft turned over and was destroyed, but all persons on board survived.
- On January 21, 2005, at around 10:00 local time, another Amaszonas Caravan (registered CP-2412) crash-landed, this time near Colquiri. The aircraft with two pilots and ten passengers on board had been on a chartered flight from La Paz to Sucre, when it encountered atmospheric icing conditions, thus being unable to maintain height. There were no fatalities, but as a consequence, Amaszonas was stripped of the allowance to operate Caravans on passenger flights. One of the survivors of the crash was Bolivian businessman and politician Samuel Doria Medina.
- On February 27, 2011, at 15:10 local time, an Amaszonas Fairchild Metro 23 (registered CP-2473) was substantially damaged when the left landing gear collapsed upon landing at El Alto International Airport. The aircraft carrying six passengers and two crew members had been on a scheduled flight from San Borja to Rurrenabaque when problems with the undercarriage occurred, leading the pilots to divert to La Paz. All persons on board survived the ensuing crash landing.
- On March 29, 2018, at 09:20 local time, an Amaszonas Fairchild Metro 23 (registered CP-2459) carrying 12 passengers and 2 crew suffered a bird strike on the right engine during takeoff at Riberalta Airport, causing the crew to abort takeoff resulting in a runway excursion. The flight was bound for Trinidad, Bolivia. There were no fatalities and only minor injuries. At the time, the executive director of Bolivia's Directorate General of Civil Aeronautics stated that Amaszonas had previously reported 11 incidents in their history.

== See also ==
- List of defunct airlines of Bolivia
