= Amaszonas Uruguay =

IATA	ICAO	Call sign
Z7	AUZ	URUGUAYO
- Founded: April 2015
- Commenced operations: June 2016; 9 years ago
- Ceased operations: 21 January 2021; 5 years ago
- Hubs: Carrasco International Airport
- Focus cities: Capitán de Corbeta Carlos A. Curbelo International Airport
- Frequent-flyer program: Jet Class Miles
- Fleet size: 1
- Destinations: 6
- Parent company: Línea Aérea Amaszonas
- Headquarters: Montevideo, Uruguay
- Key people: Sergio de Urioste (Manager)
- Website: amaszonas.com

Amaszonas Uruguay was the flag carrier airline of Uruguay. The airline operated commercial passenger services out of its hubs at Carrasco International Airport and Laguna del Sauce International Airport to most major South American destinations, as well as several secondary destinations in the Southern Cone.

== History ==
In April 2015, the Bolivian airline Línea Aérea Amaszonas reached an agreement with the Uruguayan company BQB Lineas Aereas, thus obtaining the transfer of its permits to enter the aforementioned airline's airspace and changing its name to Amaszonas Uruguay in exchange for maintaining 30 employees of this airline. The airline announced the suspension of operations on November 19, 2020. The airline officially ceased all operations on January 21, 2021.

== Destinations ==
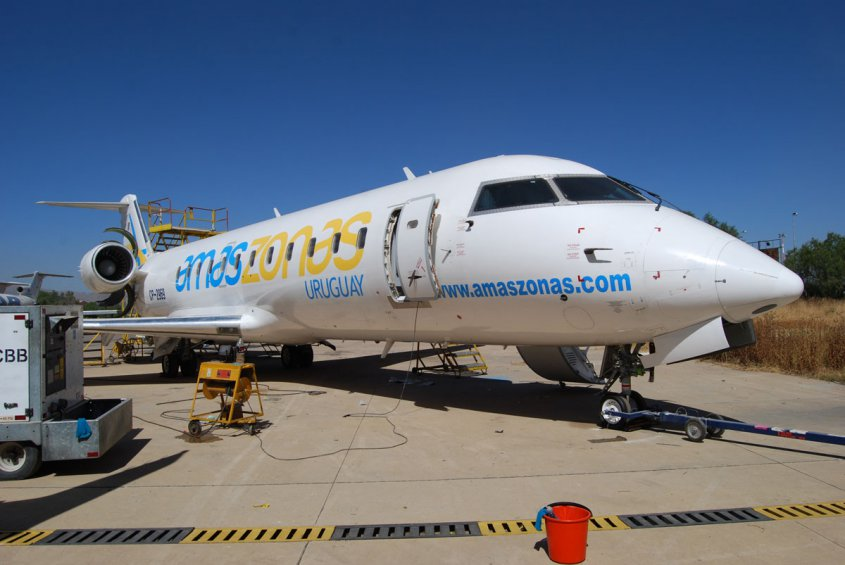
An Amaszonas Uruguay Bombardier CRJ200ER in the former livery in 2016

Amaszonas Uruguay flew to the following destinations:

Country	City	Airport	Notes
Argentina	Buenos Aires	Aeroparque Jorge Newbery	
Bolivia	Santa Cruz de la Sierra	Viru Viru International Airport	
Brazil	São Paulo	São Paulo-Guarulhos International Airport	
Paraguay	Asunción	Silvio Pettirossi International Airport	
Uruguay	Montevideo	Carrasco International Airport	Hub
Uruguay	Punta del Este	Capitán de Corbeta Carlos A. Curbelo International Airport	Focus city

=== Codeshare agreements ===
- Aerolíneas Argentinas
- Air Europa
- Copa Airlines
- Gol Linhas Aéreas Inteligentes

== Fleet ==
=== Current fleet ===
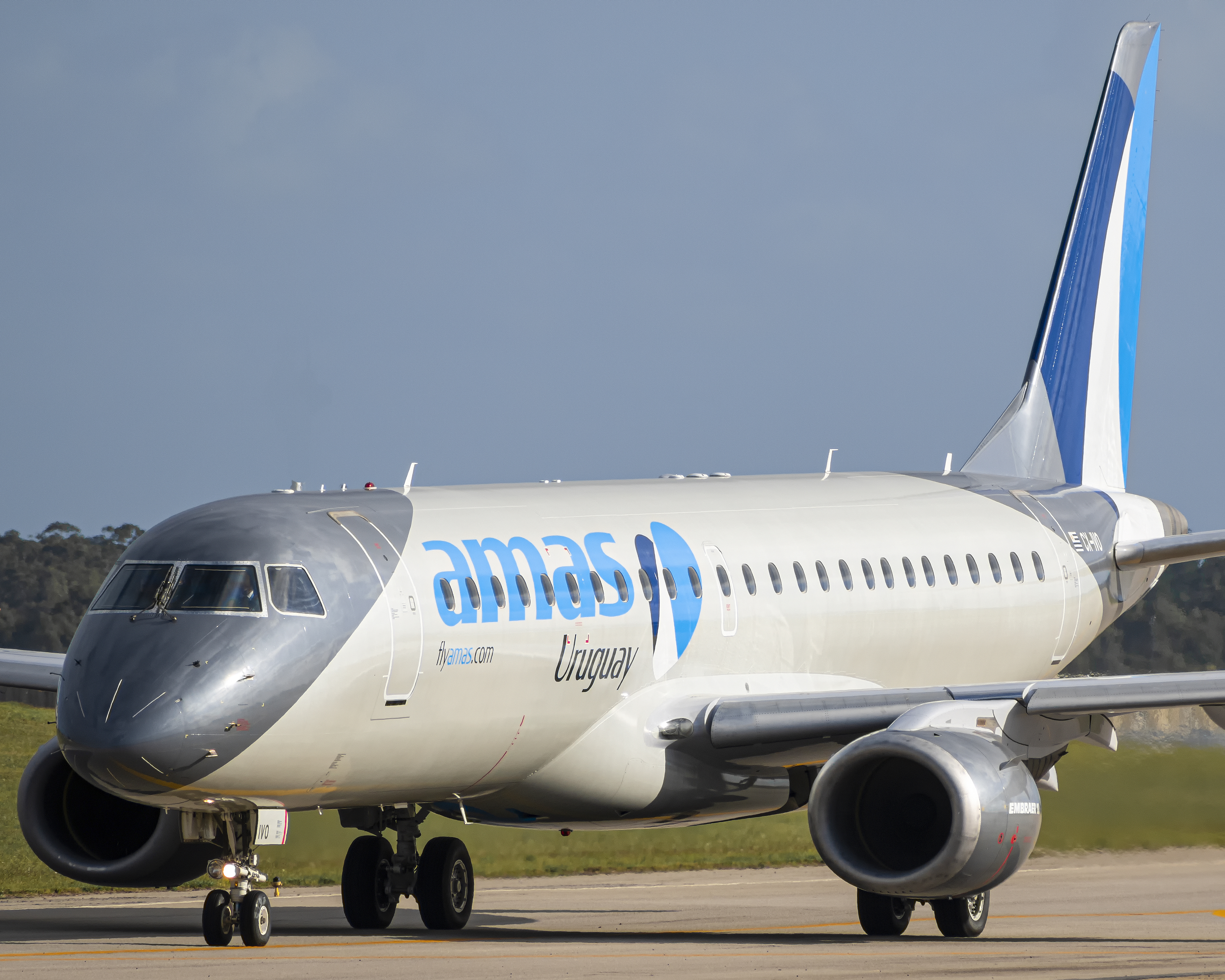
An Amaszonas Uruguay Embraer 190 in the new livery in 2020

As of January 2021, Amaszonas Uruguay's fleet consisted of the following aircraft:

Aircraft	In service	Orders	Passengers	Notes
Embraer 190	1	1	110	
Total	1	1		

=== Former fleet ===
Amaszonas Uruguay formerly operated the following aircraft:

Aircraft	Total	Introduced	Retired	Notes
Bombardier CRJ100LR	1	2016	2020	
Bombardier CRJ200ER	1	2017	2020	

== Incidents ==
On November 9, 2017, a Bombardier CRJ-200ER (registered CX-SDU) was operating Flight 749 from Asunción, Paraguay to Montevideo, Uruguay. It suffered a tire explosion at the gate, damaging another aircraft and seriously injuring a ground worker. The worker was taken to a military hospital where he had both legs amputated. The airline postponed all operations on November 10 and reestablished services the next day.

== See also ==
- List of defunct airlines of Uruguay
