= Uair =

Airline based in Uruguay

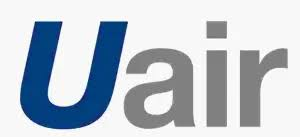
IATA	ICAO	Call sign
UE	-	-
- Founded: September 2002
- Commenced operations: 29 December 2003
- Ceased operations: 8 April 2005
- Hubs: Carrasco International Airport
- Fleet size: 2
- Destinations: 12
- Headquarters: Montevideo, Uruguay
- Key people: Antonio Rama Toscano (Founder and CEO)
- Website: www.uair.com

Uair (legally Air Euroamerica SA) was a low-cost airline based in Montevideo, Uruguay. It operated scheduled regional services to Argentina and Brazil.

== History ==
The airline was established in September 2002 and started operations on 29 December 2003, using two Fokker 100 leased from TAM Linhas Aéreas. The airline suspended its operations on 8 April 2005, after facing financial difficulties, and its aircraft were later returned to TAM.

== Destinations ==
Uair operated to over ten destinations from its base in Montevideo, including:

Argentina

- Buenos Aires - Aeroparque Jorge Newbery
- Córdoba - Ingeniero Aeronáutico Ambrosio L.V. Taravella International Airport
- Mendoza - Governor Francisco Gabrielli International Airport
- Rosario - Islas Malvinas International Airport

Brazil

- Curitiba - Afonso Pena International Airport
- Florianópolis - Hercílio Luz International Airport
- Porto Alegre - Salgado Filho Porto Alegre International Airport
- Porto Seguro - Porto Seguro Airport
- Rio de Janeiro - Rio de Janeiro/Galeão International Airport
- São Paulo - São Paulo/Guarulhos International Airport

Chile

- Santiago - Arturo Merino Benítez International Airport

Uruguay

- Montevideo - Carrasco International Airport Hub
- Punta del Este - Capitán de Corbeta Carlos A. Curbelo International Airport

== See also ==
- List of defunct airlines of Uruguay
