= List of defunct airlines of the Americas =

This is a list of defunct airlines of North and South America.

== Bermuda ==
Defunct airlines of Bermuda include:

Airline	Image	IATA	ICAO	Callsign	Commenced operations	Ceased operations	Notes
ARCO Bermuda					1968	1971	

== Dominica ==
Airline	image	year founded	ceased operations	notes
Cardinal Airlines		1998	1998	
Nature Island Express		1992	1992	Operated Beechcraft 99
Sisserou Airways		2008	?	

== Falkland Islands ==
The Falkland Islands has no listed defunct airlines.

== French Guiana ==
French Guiana Guyane air express June 1 2002 to August 2 2023

== Guadeloupe ==
Defunct airlines of Guadeloupe include:

Airline	Image	IATA	ICAO	Callsign	Commenced operations	Ceased operations	Notes
Air Guadeloupe		OG	AGU	Air Guadeloupe	1969	2000	Merged with Air Martinique, Air Saint Barthélémy, and Air Saint Martin to form Air Caraïbes
Antilles Air Service					1954	1964	Renamed/merged to Air Antilles

== Martinique ==
Defunct airlines of Martinique include:

Airline	Image	IATA	ICAO	Callsign	Commenced operations	Ceased operations	Notes
Air Martinique		NN	MTQ	Martinique	1974	2000	Merged with Air Guadeloupe, Air Saint Barthélémy, and Air Saint Martinn to form Air Caraïbes

== Saint Barthélemy ==
Saint Barthélemy has no listed defunct airlines.

== Saint Kitts and Nevis ==
Defunct airlines of Saint Kitts and Nevis include:

Airline	Image	IATA	ICAO	Callsign	Commenced operations	Ceased operations	Notes
Liberty Airlines		L7			1992	1995	
Nevis Express		VF			1993	2003	

== Saint Lucia ==
Defunct airlines of Saint Lucia include:

Airline	Image	IATA	ICAO	Callsign	Commenced operations	Ceased operations	Notes
Eagle Wings St Lucia				Eagle Air Services	1988	2001	
St. Lucia Airways		SX			1974	1987	

== Saint Martin ==
Saint Martin has no listed defunct airlines.

== Saint Pierre and Miquelon ==
Saint Pierre and Miquelon has no listed defunct airlines.

== Saint Vincent and the Grenadines ==
Saint Vincent and the Grenadines has no listed defunct airlines.

== South Georgia and the South Sandwich Islands ==
South Georgia and the South Sandwich Islands has no listed defunct airlines.

== See also ==
- List of airlines of North America
- List of airlines of South America
