= Alas Uruguay =

Urugyayan airline (2013-2016)

IATA	ICAO	Call sign
YZ	ALY	—
- Founded: October 2013
- Commenced operations: January 21, 2016 (Scheduled)
- Ceased operations: October 24, 2016
- Hubs: Carrasco International Airport; Capitán de Corbeta Carlos A. Curbelo International Airport
- Fleet size: 3
- Destinations: 4
- Headquarters: Montevideo, Uruguay
- Website: www.alasuruguay.com.uy

Alas Uruguay (Spanish for Wings Uruguay) was an airline from Uruguay. It was founded by former employees of the defunct Uruguayan flag carrier, PLUNA, which closed in 2012. PLUNA had been a state-owned enterprise most of its life, and a mixed-ownership enterprise in later years, but Alas Uruguay was started as a private company, owned and managed by its own workers. Its bases were Carrasco International Airport in Montevideo and Capitán de Corbeta Carlos A. Curbelo International Airport in Punta del Este. The company first adopted the name Alas-U, but in October 2013 was renamed Alas Uruguay. It started operations in January 2016 but, mired in debt, it stopped flying in October the same year and was eventually declared bankrupt.

== History ==
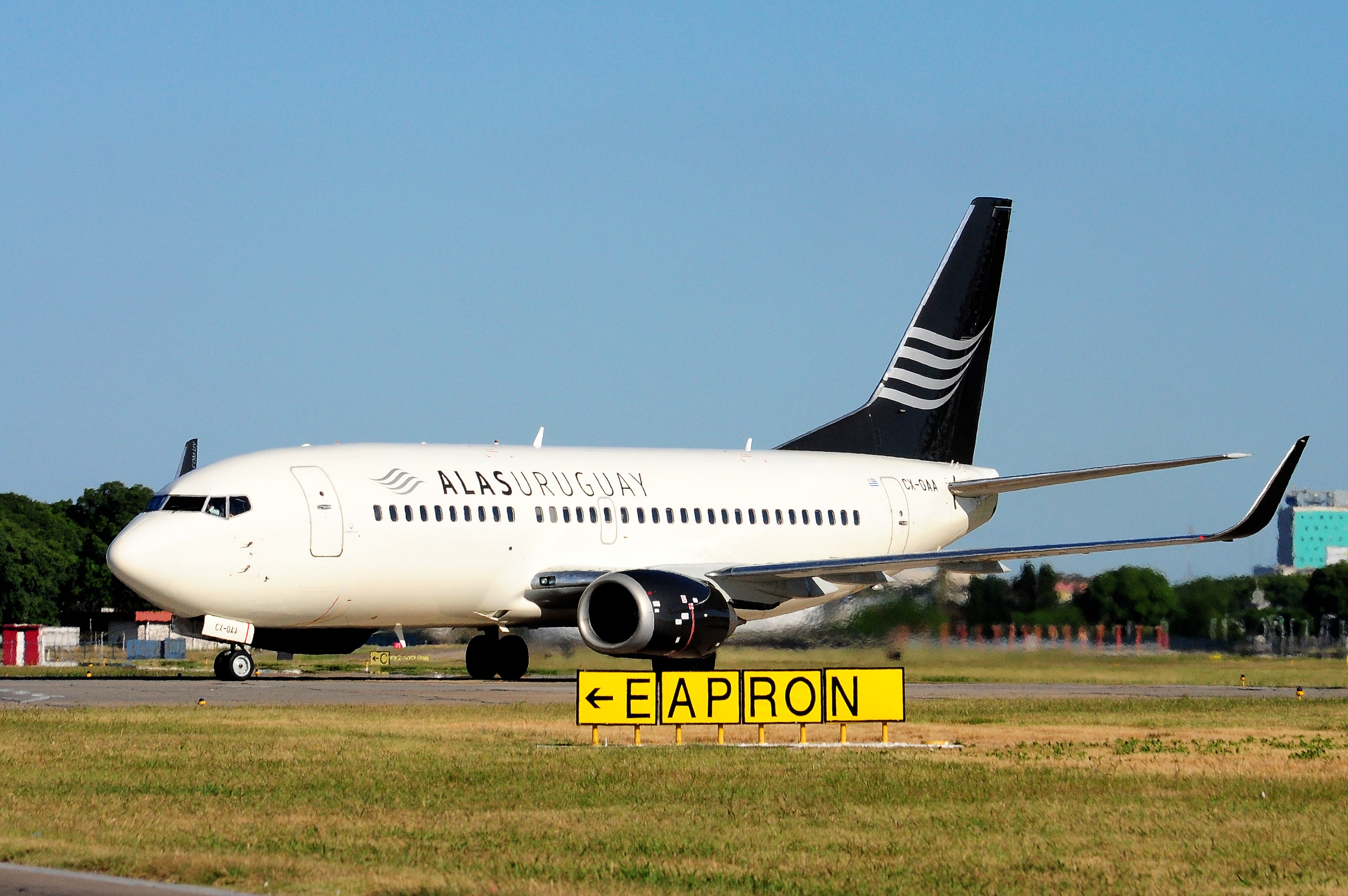
Alas Uruguay Boeing 737-300 at Aeroparque Jorge Newbery in Buenos Aires, Argentina, January 2016.

Alas Uruguay was founded in 2013 on the initiative of a group of former PLUNA employees, but several difficulties led to it starting operations only almost three years later. It had a fleet of three leased Boeing 737-300 aircraft. The first aircraft was delivered to the airline in January 2015. She had previously operated for Ukraine International Airlines (UIA). Later in 2015, a second aircraft, also previously from UIA, and a third one, previously from Southwest Airlines, were delivered. All had blended winglets.

After several postponements, Alas Uruguay commenced operations on 21 January 2016, with a flight from Montevideo to Asunción, Paraguay, followed by Buenos Aires, Argentina six days later on the 27th. The Asunción route was discontinued on 12 October 2016, as it was not profitable. Plans to fly to Brazil and Chile never materialized.

The airline operated for only nine months, struggling with financial difficulties, and suspended its operations on 24 October 2016. That day, its last remaining plane was repossessed by the lessor and Alas Uruguay filed a request to the Uruguayan authorities for a 60-day suspension of its activities, but operations never resumed and the airline lost its air operator's certificate (AOC) at the end of that period.

The company was heavily indebted, owing U.S.$15 million to the Uruguayan government for a loan granted for the start of its operations and a further U.S.$4.9 million to suppliers. Negotiations with Chilean airline Latin American Wings to take over the company failed and Alas Uruguay was declared bankrupt, but as of 2017 Azul Brazilian Airlines was negotiating with the Uruguayan government to establish a subsidiary in the country, taking up some of Alas Uruguay's routes and staff.

== Destinations ==
City	Country	Airport	Notes
Asunción	Paraguay	Silvio Pettirossi International Airport	
Buenos Aires	Argentina	Aeroparque Jorge Newbery	
Montevideo	Uruguay	Carrasco International Airport	Main hub
Punta del Este	Uruguay	Capitán de Corbeta Carlos A. Curbelo International Airport	Secondary hub

== Fleet ==
Alas Uruguay fleet
Aircraft	In Service	Orders	Passengers			Notes
Aircraft	In Service	Orders	J	Y	Total	Notes
Boeing 737-300	3			132	132	
Total	3					
