= National Directorate of Civil Aviation and Aeronautical Infrastructure =

Logo

The National Civil Aviation and Aviation Infrastructure Directorate (Spanish: Dirección Nacional de Aviación Civil e Infraestructura Aeronáutica, DINACIA) is an agency of the government of Uruguay with its headquarters located in Canelones. It serves as the country's civil aviation authority.

The Aviation Accident and Incident Investigation and Prevention Office (Spanish: Oficina de Investigación y Prevención de Accidentes e Incidentes de Aviación, OIPAIA) is part of DINACIA and is responsible for investigating aviation accidents and incidents. Its head office is located at Carrasco International Airport.

== See also ==
- Austral Líneas Aéreas Flight 2553
