= Nevis Express =

IATA	ICAO	Call sign
VF	none	none
- Founded: 1993 (as Daystar Airways AK)
- Commenced operations: 1993
- Ceased operations: 2003
- Hubs: 1
- Secondary hubs: 1
- Frequent-flyer program: Non
- Alliance: US Airways
- Fleet size: 5
- Parent company: privately held
- Headquarters: Newcastle Airport, Nevis
- Key people: Allen Haddadi, Bret Gladden, Sean Henville
- Website: www.nevisexpress.com

Nevis Express was a charter airline which operated from St Kitts and Nevis, West Indies, based at Newcastle Airport on Nevis. The fleet consisted of three BN-2A aircraft seating nine passengers, and two Beech 1900C-1 aircraft seating 19 passengers.
