= Aeromás =

Uruguayan airline

IATA	ICAO	Call sign
—	MSM	—
- Founded: 1983; 42 years ago
- Hubs: Carrasco International Airport
- Fleet size: 3
- Destinations: Uruguay, Argentina, Brazil, Paraguay
- Headquarters: Montevideo, Uruguay
- Key people: Daniel Dalmás (Founder & CEO)
- Employees: 22
- Website: www.aeromas.com

Aeromás is a cargo and private jet charter airline based in Carrasco International Airport, Montevideo, Uruguay. It is a company in the commercial air transport market with main presence in Uruguay and Mercosur. It has conducted commercial aviation activity since 1983 with a banner towing service, since expanding into providing air transport services for passengers and cargo in 1988.

It is the longest running company in the commercial air transport in Uruguay, and the first certified as a 135 Operator (135-001) in the country, also being the first one certified for business jet operation under the Uruguayan flag.

Its founder and CEO, Daniel Dalmás, is a pilot with fifty years' experience in aviation who has more than 13,000 hours of experience as Airline Captain on intercontinental operations. He currently chairs the National Association of Commercial Air Transport Companies (A.N.E.P.A.) as well as, since its formation, the Chamber of Aeronautical Operators of Uruguay (C.O.P.A.U.).

Aeromás has long experience in the transfer of executives, politicians, entertainers and top-level athletes. It has also operated, for more than 20 years, as a Flight School and currently as an authorized Civil Aviation Instruction Center (C.I.A.C.) with its Aeromás Training Center.

== History ==
The company was founded by actual Director Daniel Dalmás in 1983 as a banner towing business. It evolved into public transport in 1988 becoming Uruguay's largest air taxi company. It is partly owned by Southern Cross Aviation Inc., Fort Lauderdale, Florida

== Fleet ==
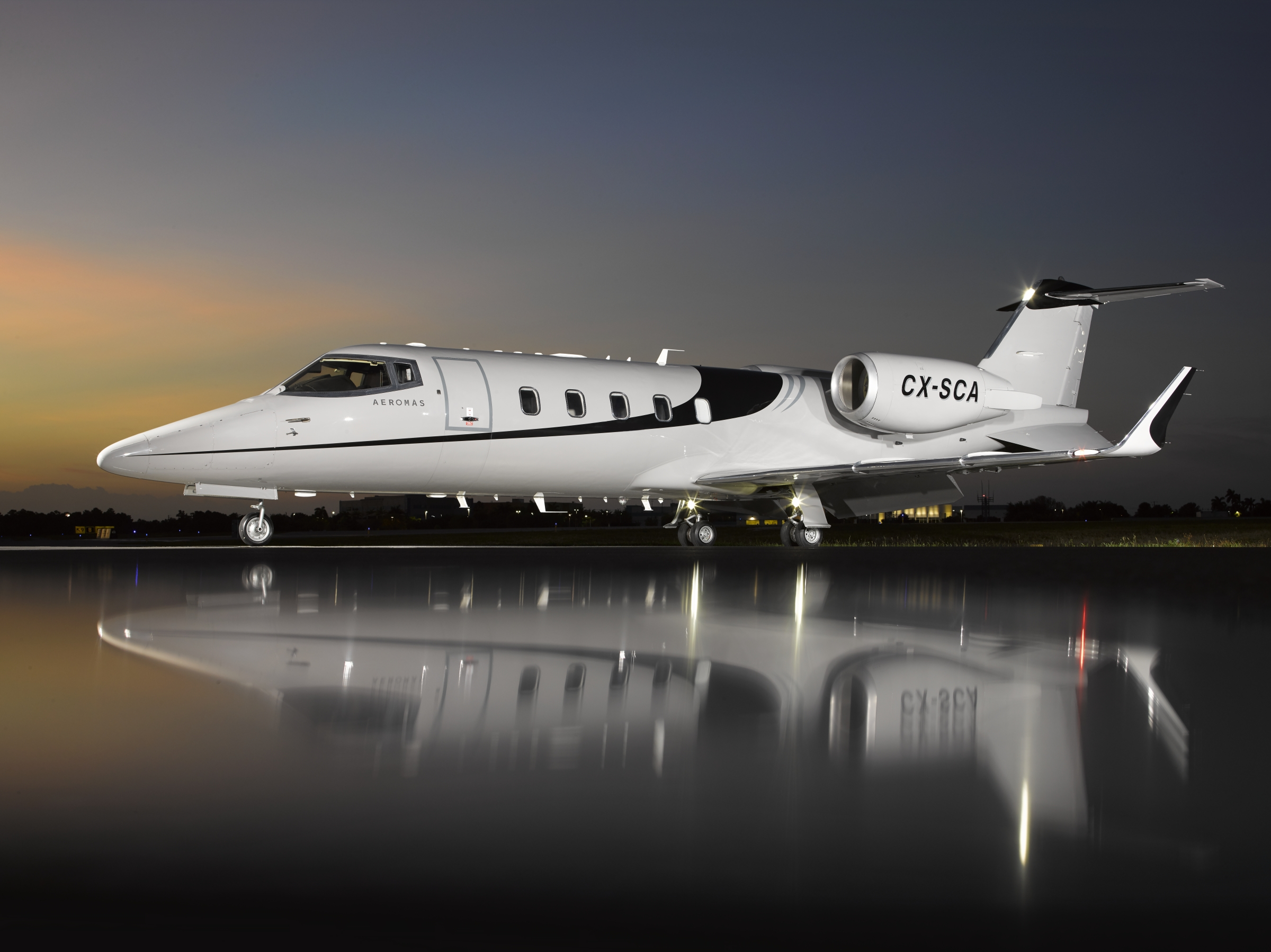
Aeromas Learjet 60

The Aeromás fleet includes the following aircraft (as of February 2023):

- 1 Embraer EMB 110P1 Bandeirante CX-MAS
- 1 Learjet 60 CX-SCA
- 1 Piper PA-38 Tomahawk CX-BKC

== Accidents & incidents ==
- On the 16th of February 2023, in the early morning, an Aeromás Cessna 208 registered CX-MAX was destroyed in a forced landing incident at Berisso, Argentina. There were no casualties.

== See also ==
- List of airlines of Uruguay
