= Eugenio Martínez Thedy =

Uruguayan diplomat (1885–1967)

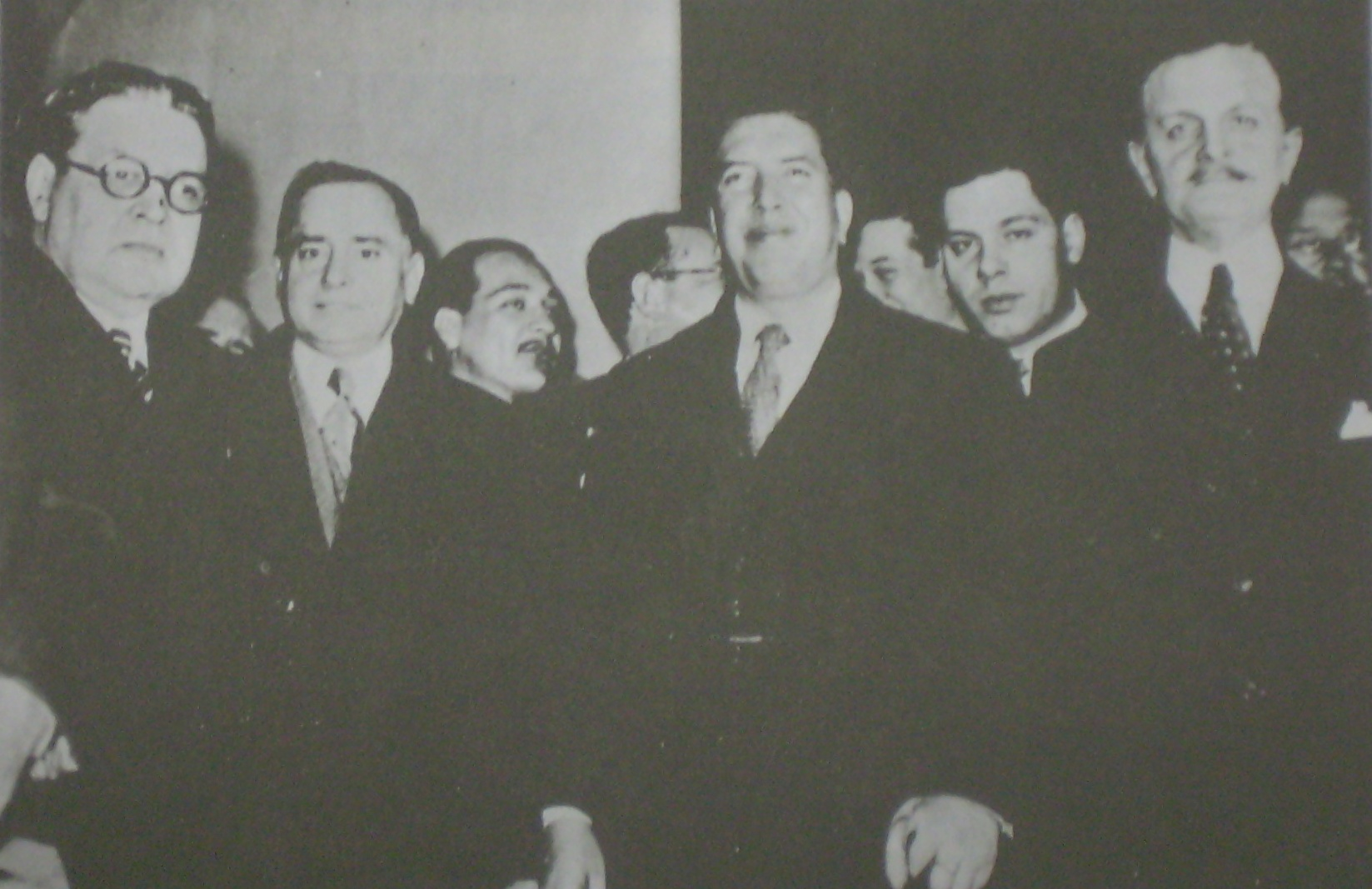
Eugenio Martínez Thedy (Uruguay), Luis A. Riart (Paraguay), Tomás M. Elío (Bolivia), and Carlos Saavedra Lamas (Argentina), brokering peace for the Chaco War.

Eugenio Martínez Thedy (8 August 1885 in Salto – 1 January 1967) was a Uruguayan diplomat and politician.

He served in several political offices, including Parliament and the Municipality of Montevideo.

He took part in the negotiation of a peace agreement that ended the Chaco War between Paraguay and Bolivia. Further, he was ambassador to Peru, Argentina, and Chile.

A street in Montevideo bears his name.
