= Air Class Líneas Aéreas =

Uruguayan cargo airline

IATA	ICAO	Call sign
VZ	QCL	ACLA
- Founded: 1996; 30 years ago
- Commenced operations: 1997; 29 years ago
- Hubs: Carrasco International Airport
- Fleet size: 4
- Destinations: 5
- Headquarters: Montevideo, Uruguay
- Key people: Daniel Hernandez (CEO)
- Employees: 40 (2025)
- Website: www.airclasscargo.com

Air Class Líneas Aéreas is a cargo airline based in Montevideo, Uruguay. It operates freight and scheduled/charter passenger services. Its main base is Carrasco International Airport in Montevideo.

== History ==
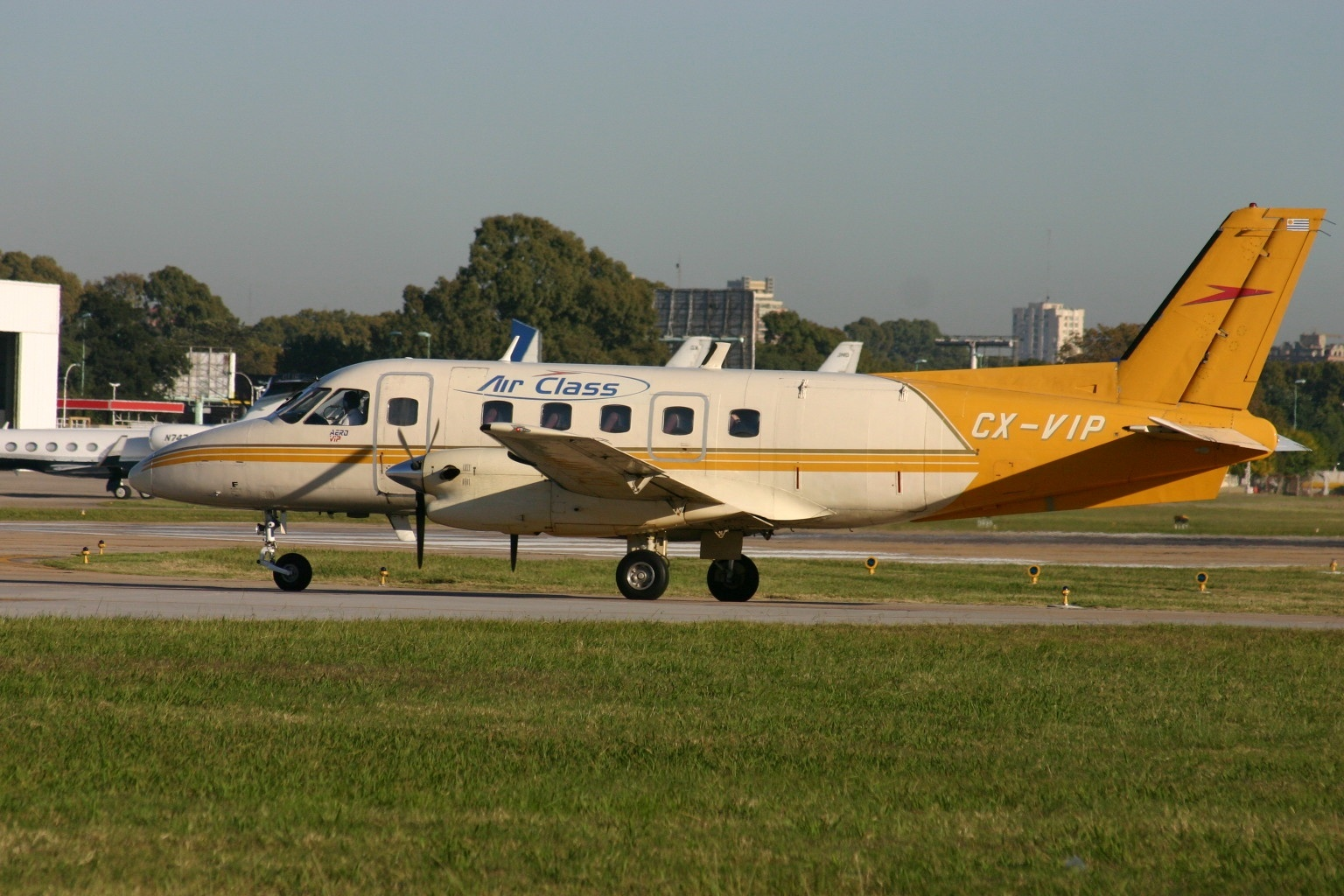
A former Air Class Embraer EMB 110P1 Bandeirante at Carrasco International Airport in 2012

The airline was established as an air taxi service in 1996 and began operating in 1997 between Montevideo and Buenos Aires, with further destinations added later.

== Destinations ==
As of March 2007, Air Class operated passenger and freight services between Montevideo and Buenos Aires, as well as charter flights to Brazil, Paraguay and Chile. Additionally, the company had a contract with DHL and some of their aircraft carried the DHL logo on the side.

Country	City	Airport	Notes
Argentina	Buenos Aires	Ministro Pistarini International Airport	
Brazil	São Paulo	São Paulo/Guarulhos International Airport	Charter
Chile	Santiago	Arturo Merino Benítez International Airport	Charter
Paraguay	Asunción	Silvio Pettirossi International Airport	
Uruguay	Montevideo	Carrasco International Airport	Hub

== Partners ==
Air Class operates flights on behalf of other airlines:

- Air Europa (Madrid via Buenos Aires)
- Kalitta Air (Miami via Santiago)

== Fleet ==
=== Current ===
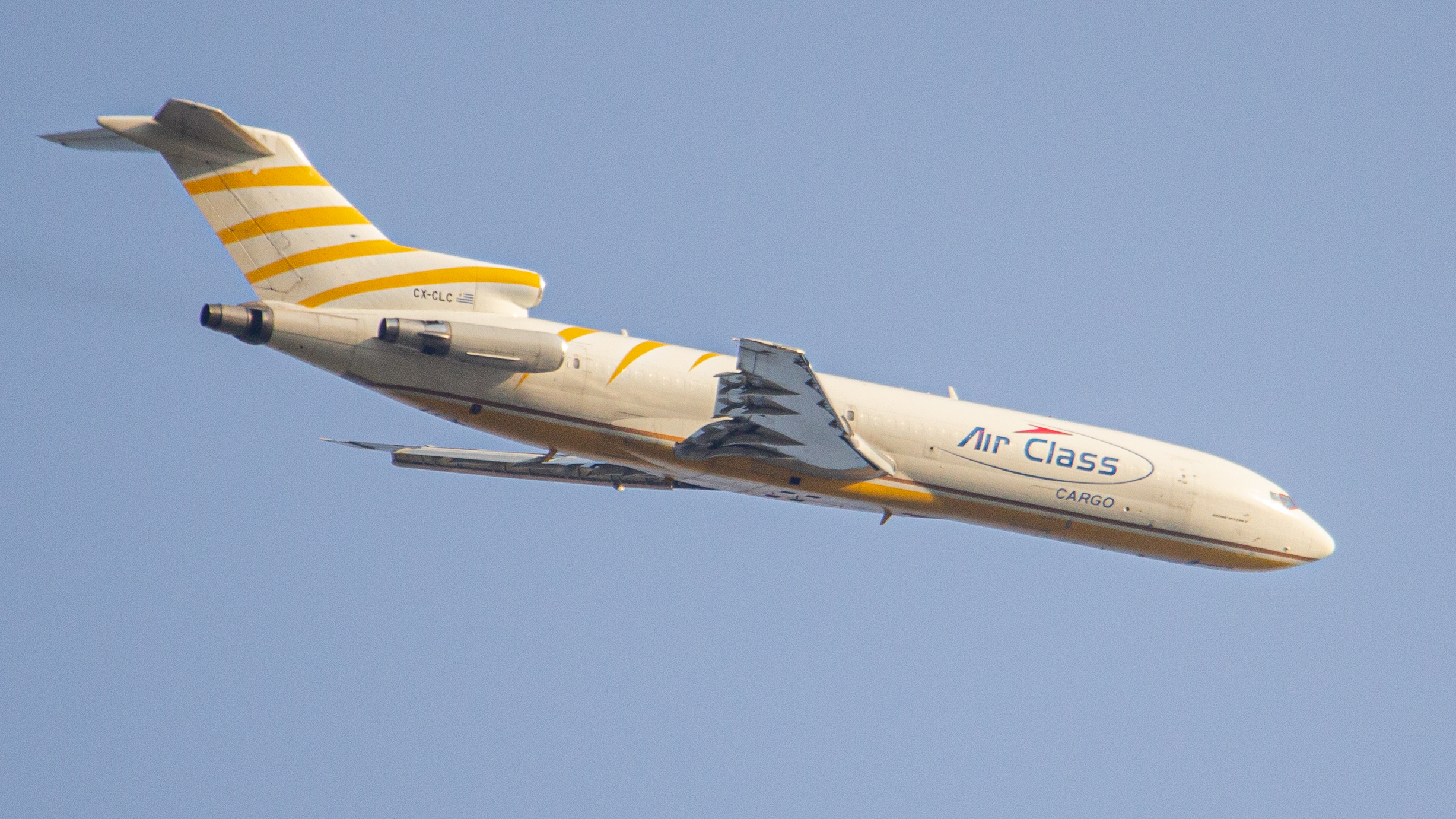
An Air Class Boeing 727-200F, 2023

As of March 2025, Air Class Líneas Aéreas consists of the following aircraft.

Air Class Líneas Aéreas fleet
Aircraft	In service	Orders	Notes
Boeing 727-200F	2	—	
Fairchild SA227AC Metro III	2	—	
Total	4	—	

=== Former ===
The carrier also operated the following aircraft types throughout its history:

- 1 Embraer EMB 110P1 Bandeirante

== Accidents and incidents ==
- On June 6, 2012, a Fairchild SA227AC Metro III (registered CX-LAS) performing a freight flight on behalf of DHL from Montevideo to Buenos Aires, disappeared south of the Isla de Flores. Parts of the aircraft were located by a scuba diver approximately 1 nautical mile (1.9 km) south of Isla de Flores on July 20, 2012, with the discovery confirmed by the National Navy of Uruguay. Parts of the nose gear were located, with priority then given to locating the remains of the two crew members. On August 2, 2012, the Navy of Uruguay reported that the cockpit voice recorder had been recovered from the aircraft, along with the remains of an engine, the tailcone, and some other portions of the aircraft. Both occupants died.

== See also ==
- List of airlines of Uruguay
