= Capitán de Corbeta Carlos A. Curbelo International Airport =

Capitán de Corbeta Carlos A. Curbelo International Airport Laguna del Sauce International Airport
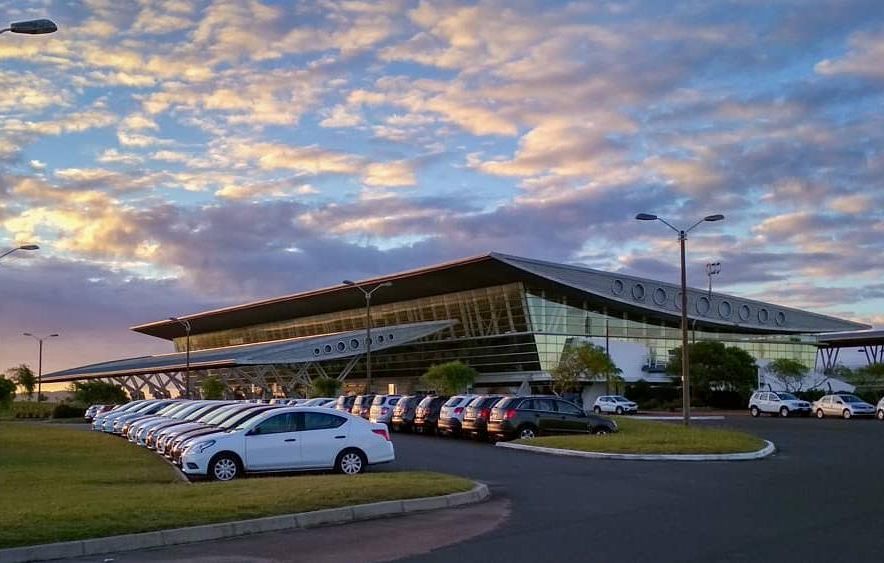
- IATA: PDP; ICAO: SULS

Summary
- Airport type: Public and Military
- Operator: Aeropuertos Uruguay
- Serves: Punta del Este
- Location: Piriápolis, Maldonado, Uruguay
- Elevation AMSL: 95 ft (29 m)
- Coordinates: 34°51′20″S 55°05′40″W
- Website: puntadeleste.aero

Map
- Location in Uruguay

Runways
Direction	Length		Surface
Direction	m	ft	Surface
01/19	1,606	5,269	Asphalt
08/26	2,130	6,988	Asphalt

Statistics (2018)
- Passengers: 165.960
- Sources: WAD

Capitán de Corbeta Carlos A. Curbelo International Airport (Spanish: Aeropuerto Internacional Capitán de Corbeta Carlos A. Curbelo) (IATA: PDP, ICAO: SULS), also known by its former official name of Laguna del Sauce International Airport, and as Punta del Este International Airport, is an airport serving Punta del Este, Uruguay, located in the adjoining municipality of Maldonado. It is operated by Consorcio Aeropuertos Internacionales S.A. (CAISA). The airport is 14 kilometres (8.7 mi) northwest of Maldonado.

The terminal building, designed by architect Carlos Ott, was inaugurated in 1997. Gabriel Gurméndez Armand-Ugon, former Uruguayan Minister of Transport and Public Works, has served as General Manager of the airport.

The airport is both civil and military. The National Navy of Uruguay has its main (and only) base here for the naval aviation arm.

== Traffic ==
The airport mainly serves passengers traveling to neighbouring Punta del Este, although it also serves cities surrounding the Maldonado area.

The airport typically sees a growth in passenger numbers during the southern hemisphere summer months. Most of the passengers who fly to the airport come from Buenos Aires. International service is available from Argentina, Brazil, Chile and Paraguay as well.

The airport can handle many types of aircraft including wide-bodies, although usually mid-size jets like the Boeing 737 and Airbus A320, and turbo-props like the ATR 42 are used in this airport.

== Airlines and destinations ==
Airlines	Destinations
Aerolíneas Argentinas	Buenos Aires–Aeroparque; Seasonal: Córdoba (AR), Porto Alegre, São Paulo–Guarulhos
Azul Brazilian Airlines	São Paulo–Guarulhos; Seasonal: Belo Horizonte–Confins (begins 14 December 2026), Campinas, Porto Alegre (resumes 12 December 2026)
Gol Linhas Aéreas	Seasonal: Buenos Aires–Aeroparque, Porto Alegre (begins 21 December 2026), São Paulo–Guarulhos
Paranair	Seasonal: Asunción

== Statistics ==
The airport is currently the second busiest airport in Uruguay, both in passenger service and scheduled flights.

Traffic	2008	2007	2006	2005	2004	2003	2002	2001	2000
Passengers	n.d.	210,988	217,006	228,401	230,649	174,167	150,394	210,671	225,968
Cargo (tons)	n.d.	n.d.	285	361	n.d.	n.d.	n.d.	11	13

In addition to scheduled flights, multiple private aircraft use its runways. In 2025, records were broken in this regard.

== See also ==
- Transport in Uruguay
- List of airports in Uruguay
