= Carrasco International Airport =

Uruguayan airport serving Montevideo

Carrasco/General Cesáreo L. Berisso International Airport Aeropuerto Internacional de Carrasco/General Cesáreo L. Berisso
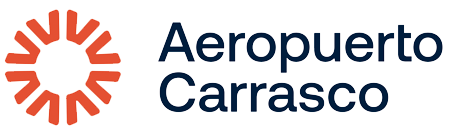

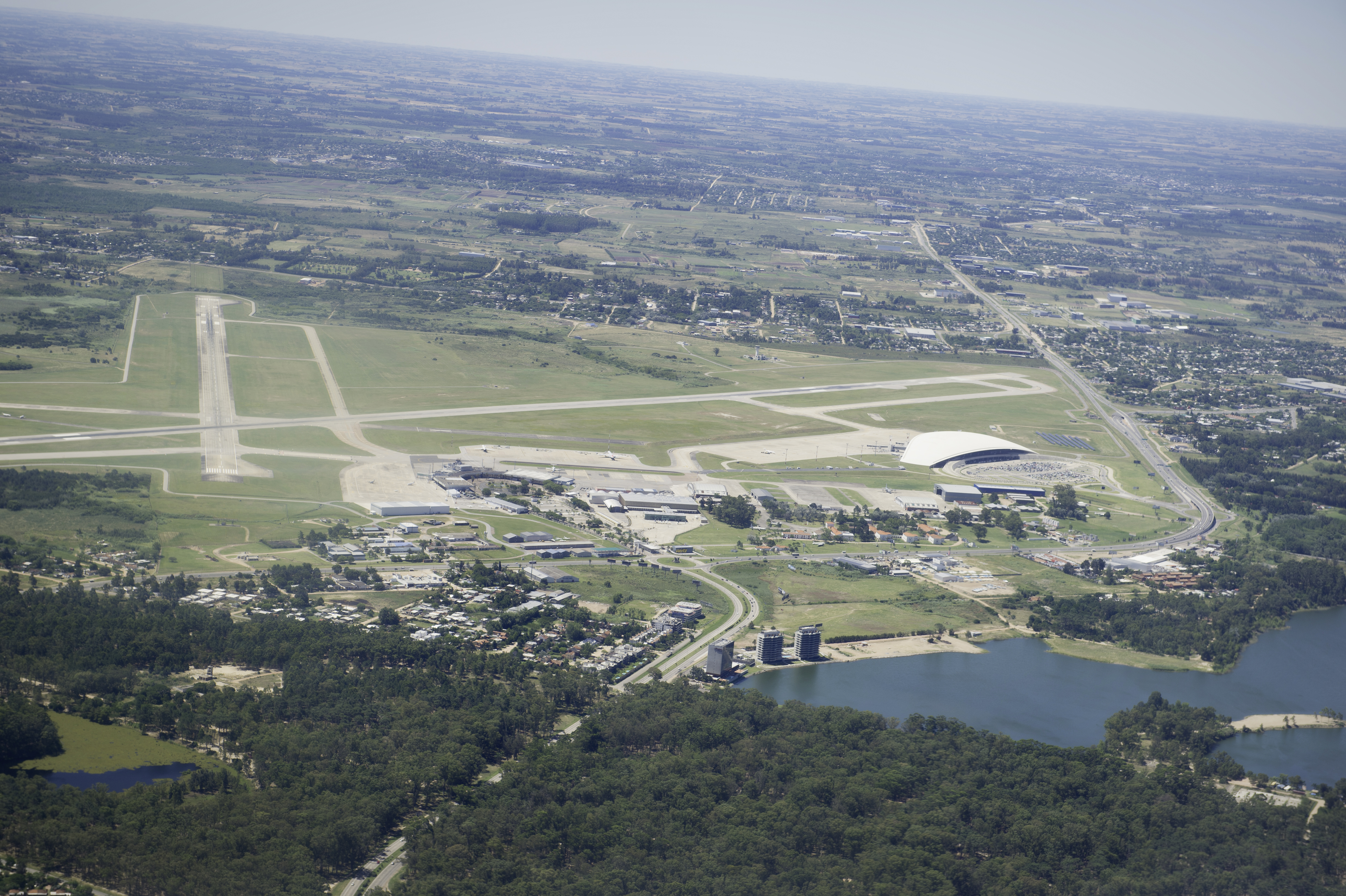
- IATA: MVD; ICAO: SUMU

Summary
- Airport type: Public / Military
- Operator: Aeropuertos Uruguay
- Serves: Montevideo
- Location: Ciudad de la Costa, Canelones
- Opened: 1947
- Hub for: Air Class Líneas Aéreas
- Elevation AMSL: 105 ft (32 m)
- Coordinates: 34°50′18″S 56°01′51″W
- Website: www.aeropuertodecarrasco.com.uy

Map
- Location in the city of Montevideo MVD (Uruguay)

Runways
Direction	Length		Surface
Direction	m	ft	Surface
01/19	2,250	7,382	Asphalt
07/25	3,200	10,499	Asphalt

Statistics (2025)
- Passengers: 2,084,836
- Aircraft Operations: 15,291
- Metric tonnes of cargo: 28,946
- Sources: Airport Website, SkyVector, Google Maps, DINACIA

Carrasco/General Cesáreo L. Berisso International Airport (IATA: MVD, ICAO: SUMU) is the main international airport of Uruguay. It is the country's largest airport and is located in the Carrasco neighborhood of Montevideo. It has been cited as one of the most efficient and traveler-friendly airports in Latin America.

The airport is named after Cesáreo L. Berisso, a pioneer of Uruguayan aviation, and it also hosts an air base of the Uruguayan Air Force.

== History ==
The original passenger terminal was inaugurated in 1947. In 2003 the Uruguayan government transferred the administration, operation and maintenance of the airport to the private investment group Puerta del Sur S.A, which since then invested in several upgrades of the airport.

On 3 February 2007, construction began on a new terminal parallel to Runway 06/24. Runway 01/19 was lengthened to 2,250 metres (7,382 ft) and the former Runway 10/28 was permanently closed because the new terminal cuts across it. The new terminal, designed by Uruguayan architect Rafael Viñoly, has the capacity to handle 3 million passengers a year, including a much larger parking area built for over 1200 vehicles. This new terminal building has four jetways, separate floors for arrivals and departures and a large viewing area on the top floor. The terminal has room for expansion for two additional jetways and a maximum capacity of 6 million passengers per year before the building would need actual enlargement. The new terminal was inaugurated on 5 October 2009 with official operations beginning on 29 December 2009. A new US$15 million cargo terminal was also constructed.

Regular passenger flights were suspended in mid-March 2020 due to the COVID-19 pandemic. Regular flights to Spain were resumed in July, and to São Paulo and Santiago in August.

The airport serves as the main operational hub of cargo and charter passenger airline Air Class Líneas Aéreas.

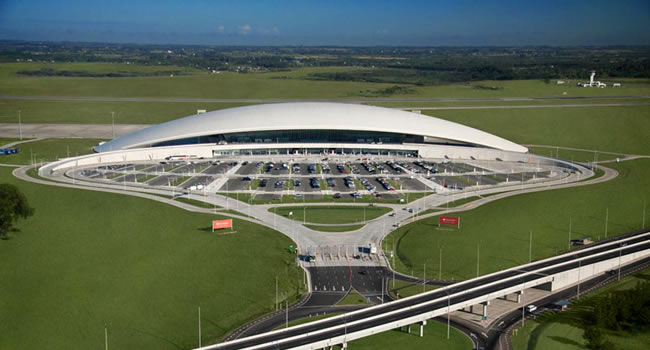
View towards the terminal

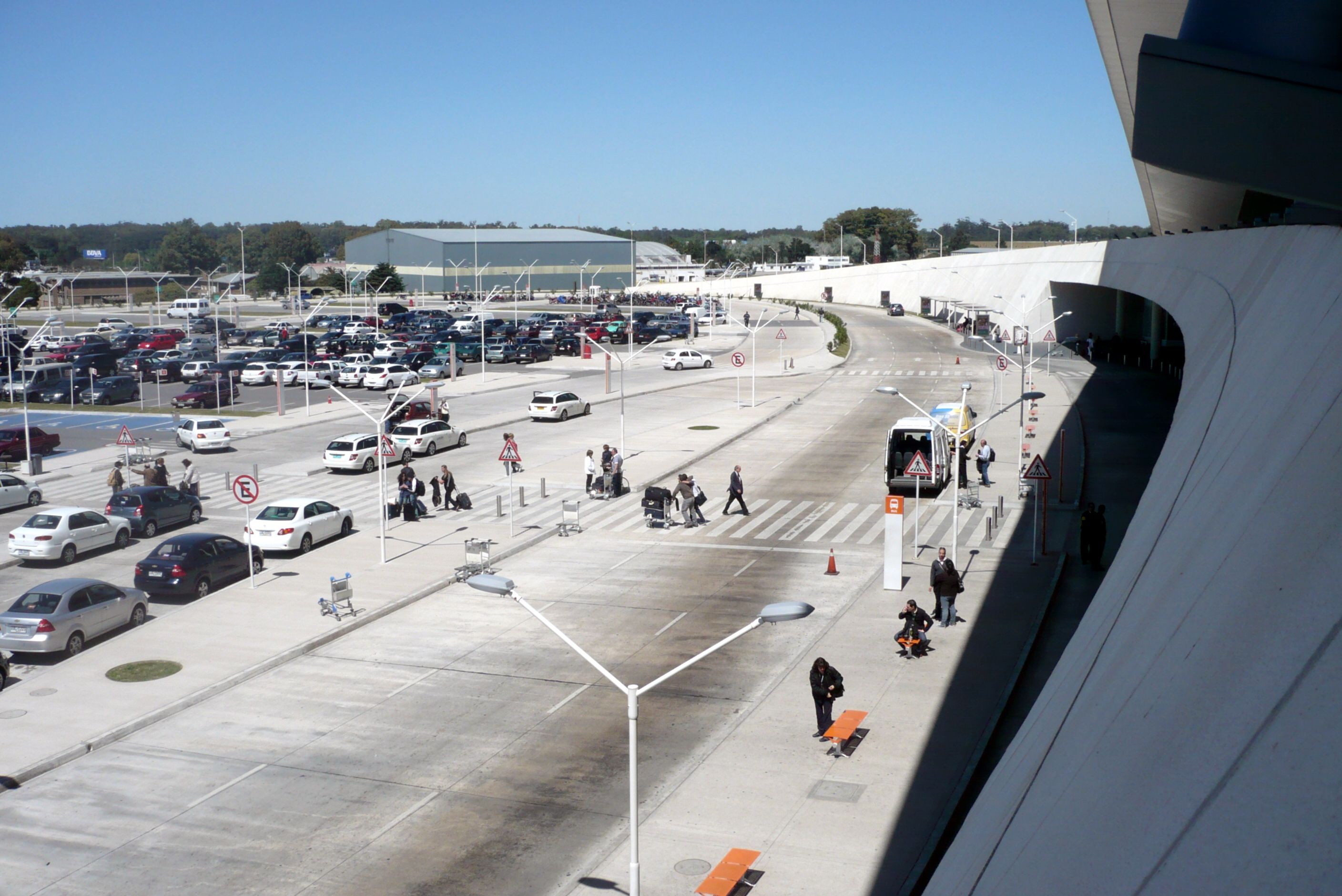
Terminal exterior

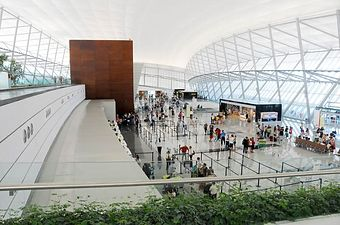
Check-in hall

== Airlines and destinations ==
=== Passenger ===
Airlines	Destinations
Aerolíneas Argentinas	Buenos Aires–Aeroparque
Air Europa	Madrid
American Airlines	Seasonal: Miami
Arajet	Punta Cana (begins 3 March 2027)
Avianca	Bogotá
Azul Brazilian Airlines	Belo Horizonte-Confins, Porto Alegre (resumes 14 December 2026), Recife
Copa Airlines	Panama City–Tocumen
Gol Linhas Aéreas	Fortaleza (ends 5 December 2026), Rio de Janeiro–Galeão (ends 26 January 2027), São Paulo–Guarulhos; Seasonal: Natal
Iberia	Madrid
JetSmart Chile	Rio de Janeiro–Galeão, Santiago de Chile; Seasonal: Recife
LATAM Brasil	São Paulo–Guarulhos
LATAM Chile	Santiago de Chile
LATAM Paraguay	Asunción (begins 28 December 2026)
LATAM Perú	Lima
Paranair	Asunción
Sky Airline	São Paulo–Guarulhos, Salvador da Bahia, Santiago de Chile
Sky Airline Peru	Seasonal: Florianópolis, Lima

== Statistics ==
Traffic	2025	2024	2023	2022	2021	2020	2019	2018	2017
Passengers	2,084,836	2,097,237	1,763,352	1,221,151	423,997	508,203	1,987,389	2,071,724	2,102,516
Cargo (tons)	28,946	25,042	26,924	33,262	23,827	18,750	26,062	26,134	26,038

== Ground transportation ==
The airport is located 19 km (12 mi) from downtown Montevideo. The airport is served by public transit and a private taxi service which connect to Montevideo and Punta del Este.

== Other facilities ==
The Oficina de Investigación y Prevención de Accidentes e Incidentes de Aviación (OIPAIA) of the National Civil Aviation and Aviation Infrastructure Direction (DINACIA) has its head office on the airport property.

== Accidents and incidents ==
- 18 September 1957: a Real Transportes Aéreos Convair 440-62 registration PP-AQE belonging to Transportes Aéreos Nacional, flying from Porto Alegre to Montevideo had an accident during touch down operations in Montevideo. While on a night landing procedure under fog, the aircraft undershot the runway by 1,030m, causing the left and middle gear to hit an earth bank bordering a highway. The right wing touched the ground and further on the aircraft lost both propellers. The right wing then broke off. One crew member died.
- 20 October, 2009: Centurion Air Cargo Flight 431, a McDonnell Douglas MD-11F (registered N701GC) sustained damage on landing at Carrasco International Airport. The right hand main landing gear leg was bent sideways during landing on runway 24. The crew managed to stop on taxiway A where the airplane had to be offloaded.
- 6 June 2012: an Air Class Líneas Aéreas Fairchild SA227AC Metro III, registered CX-LAS, performing a freight flight on behalf of DHL from Montevideo to Buenos Aires disappeared south of Isla de Flores. Parts of the aircraft were located by a scuba diver approximately 1 nautical mile (1.9 km) south of Isla de Flores on 20 July 2012.

== General Cesáreo Berisso Air Force Base ==
The General Cesareo Berisso Air Force Base is a base of the Uruguayan Air Force. It shares runways with the Carrasco International Airport. Most of its facilities are located just east of the old civilian terminal. It is named in honor of Cesáreo L. Berisso, a pioneer of Uruguayan aviation.

=== Air Brigade I ===
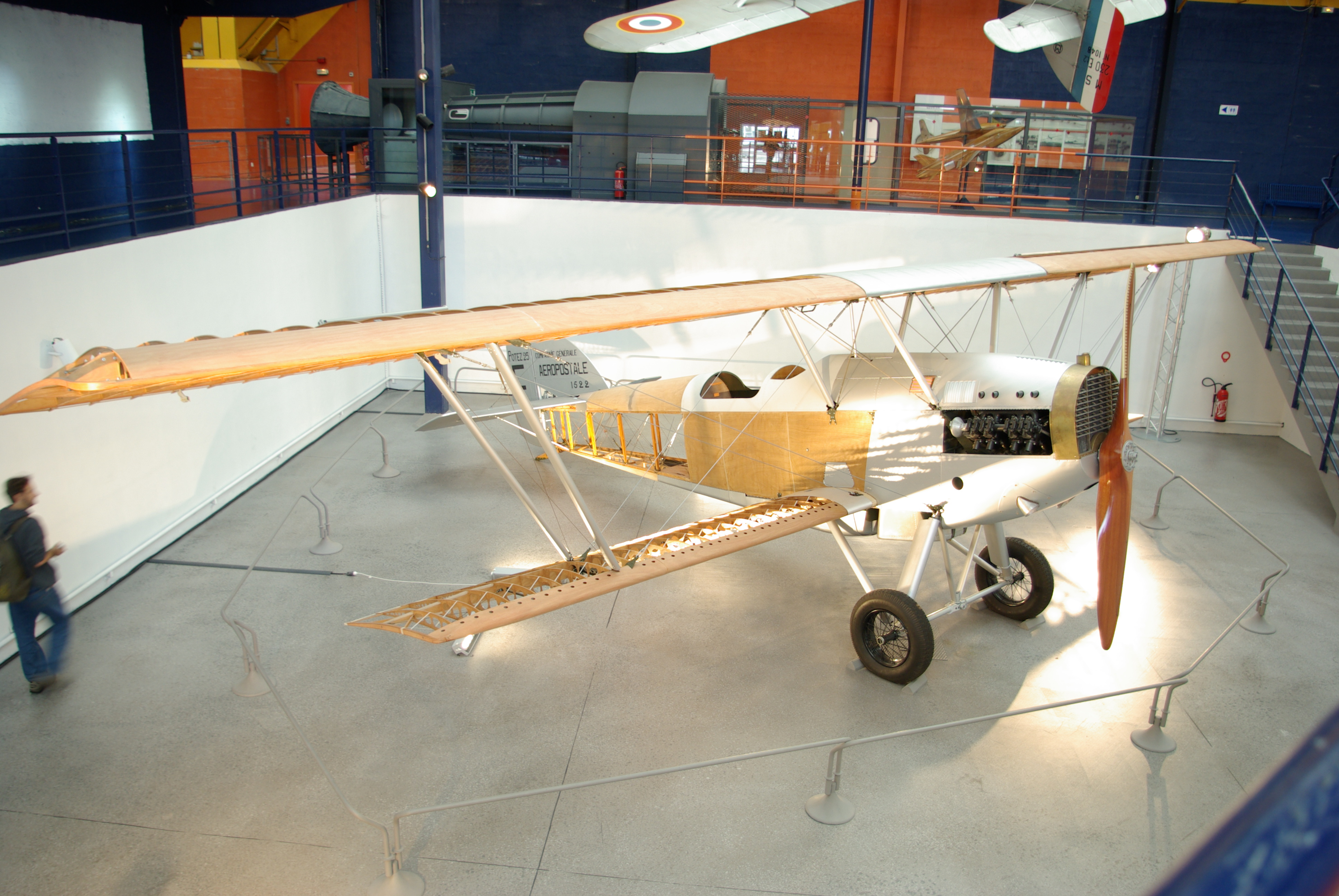
Potez 25 aircraft

Air Brigade I, one of the three brigades of the Uruguayan Air Force, is stationed at the base. It was created as Aeronáutica n.º 1 in April 1936, when it was assigned 8 Potez 25 fighter aircraft.

Air Brigade I comprises three units:

- The Central Office of Assistance and the Carrasco Rescue Coordination Center.
- No. 3 Squadron (Transportation)
- No. 5 Squadron (Helicopters)

=== No.3 Squadron (Transportation) ===
No. 3 Squadron operates 4 aircraft types:

- Lockheed C-130 Hercules - Military transport (2)
- Embraer C-95 Bandeirante - Light military transport (3)
- Embraer EMB 120 Brasilia - Short distance VIP transport (1)
- CASA C-212 Aviocar - Tactical transport (4)

=== No.5 Squadron (Helicopters) ===
No.5 Squadron operates 3 helicopter types:

- UH-1H Iroquois - Utility (6)
- Bell 212 - Utility (2)
- AS-365 Dauphin - VIP transport (1)

=== Colonel Jaime Meregalli Aeronautical Museum ===
Also on the base is the Colonel Jaime Meregalli Aeronautical Museum, with a hangar for static aircraft display, in addition to a building that exhibits historical aviation material.

== See also ==
- Transport in Uruguay
- Punta del Este International Airport
- List of airports in Uruguay
