= Aeroportos do Paraná (SEIL) =

SEIL
- Type: State company
- Industry: Aviation
- Products: Airports administration

Aeroportos do Paraná (English: Airports of Paraná) is the department of airports infrastructure of the state of Paraná in Brazil. Aeroportos do Paraná was originally part of the Secretaria de Estado de Transportes do Estado do Paraná (English: Transportation Secretariat of the State of Paraná), but state law 16,841/2011 created the Secretaria de Infraestrutura e Logística (English: Infrastructure and Logistics Secretariat), which became then responsible for the operational support of 35 public airports within the state, in partnership with the Municipalities where they are located, and in accordance to directives from the National Civil Aviation Agency of Brazil (ANAC).

== List of airports supported by SEIL ==
The following airports are operated directly or indirectly by their local municipalities with the support of Aeroportos do Paraná – SEIL:

- Andirá
- Apucarana – Capt. João Busse Airport
- Arapongas – Alberto Bertelli Airport
- Arapoti – Avelino Vieira Airport
- Bandeirantes
- Campo Mourão – Cel. Geraldo Guias de Aquino Airport
- Cascavel – Adalberto Mendes da Silva Airport
- Castro
- Centenário do Sul
- Cianorte – Gastão de Mesquita Filho Airport
- Cornélio Procópio – Francisco Lacerda Junior Airport
- Francisco Beltrão – Paulo Abdala Airport
- Goioerê
- Guaíra – Walter Martins de Oliveira Airport
- Guarapuava – Tancredo Thomas de Farias Airport
- Guaratuba
- Ibaiti
- Loanda
- Manoel Ribas
- Marechal Cândido Rondon - Balduino Helmuth Jope
- Maringá – Sílvio Name Júnior Regional Airport
- Medianeira
- Palmas
- Palotina
- Paranaguá – Santos Dumont Airport
- Pato Branco – Juvenal Loureiro Cardoso Airport
- Ponta Grossa – Comte. Antonio Amilton Beraldo Airport
- Realeza
- Sertanópolis
- Siqueira Campos
- Telêmaco Borba – Telêmaco Borba Airport
- Toledo – Luiz dal Canalle Filho Airport
- União da Vitória – José Cleto Airport

== List of airports once managed by SEIL ==
The following airport was once managed by SEIL:

- Paranavaí – Edu Chaves Airport

== Top 5 ==
In 2011 those were the top 5 airports according to number of transported passengers and number of aircraft operations:

=== Number of transported passengers ===
- 1 - Maringá – Sílvio Name Júnior Regional Airport – 677,264
- 2 - Cascavel – Adalberto Mendes da Silva Airport – 50,651
- 3 - Umuarama – Orlando de Carvalho Airport – 4,691
- 4 - Pato Branco – Juvenal Loureiro Cardoso Airport – 3,087
- 5 - Telêmaco Borba – Telêmaco Borba Airport – 2,718

=== Number of aircraft operations ===
- 1 - Maringá – Sílvio Name Júnior Regional Airport – 16,726
- 2 - Cascavel – Adalberto Mendes da Silva Airport – 5,430
- 3 - Ponta Grossa – Comte. Antonio Amilton Beraldo Airport – 3,657
- 4 - Umuarama – Orlando de Carvalho Airport – 3,011
- 5 - Guarapuava – Tancredo Thomas de Farias Airport – 2,805

== See also ==
- List of airports in Brazil
- List of the busiest airports in Brazil
