= Helisul Linhas Aéreas =

Brazilian airline

- Founded: 1994
- Ceased operations: 1998
- Operating bases: Curitiba-Bacacheri
- Parent company: TAM Transportes Aéreos Regionais
- Headquarters: Curitiba, Brazil
- Key people: Eloy Biesuz; Rolim Amaro

Helisul Linhas Aéreas S/A was a Brazilian airline founded in 1994. In 1996, it was sold to TAM Transportes Aéreos Regionais, which incorporated the airline in 1998.

== History ==
On October 5, 1972, Tropical Táxi Aéreo was founded in Foz do Iguaçu. It was a subsidiary of Tropical Hotéis, a company part of the same holding that owned Varig. This was later bought by Eloy Biesuz and the name changed to Helisul Táxi Aéreo Ltda.

As part of its growing activities, Helisul Taxi Aéreo founded on May 16, 1994 Helisul Linhas Aéreas, as a charter airline operating regular flights and with operations concentrated at Curitiba-Bacacheri Airport linking Curitiba to other cities in Paraná state. On January 1, 1995 its license was updated to one of a regional carrier.

On July 1, 1996 Helisul was sold to TAM Airlines and it began operating feeder services to TAM. Later, in December of the same year, as Brasil Central Linhas Aéreas was rebranded as TAM-Meridional, Helisul was also rebranded as TAM Express and received the entire Caravan fleet of Brasil Central to operate its former network. In 1998 it was completely incorporated by TAM.

Helisul Táxi Aéreo still operates helicopter flights in Rio de Janeiro and Foz do Iguaçu and has certified maintenance plants at Curitiba-Bacacheri Airport.

== Destinations ==
Helisul served the following cities:

- Blumenau – Quero-quero Airport
- Campo Mourão – Cel. Geraldo Guias de Aquino Airport
- Cascavel – Adalberto Mendes da Silva Airport
- Chapecó – Serafin Enoss Bertaso Airport
- Concórdia – Olavo Cecco Rigon Airport
- Curitiba – Bacacheri Airport
- Francisco Beltrão – Paulo Abdala Airport
- Guarapuava – Tancredo Thomas de Faria Airport
- Joaçaba – Santa Terezinha Airport
- Pato Branco – Juvenal Loureiro Cardoso Airport
- São Miguel do Oeste – Hélio Wasum Airport
- São Paulo – Congonhas Airport

== Fleet ==
Helisul and TAM Express fleets
Aircraft	Total	Years of operation	Notes
Embraer EMB 110 Bandeirante	4	1994-1996	
Cessna 208 Caravan	38	1996-1998	

== Accidents and incidents ==
- 13 September 1996: an Embraer EMB 110 Bandeirante registration PT-WAV operating a cargo flight from Porto Alegre to Joinville collided with a hill and crashed during final approach to land at Joinville. The crew of two died.

== See also ==
- TAM - Transportes Aéreos Regionais
- List of defunct airlines of Brazil
