= Guaira =

Guaira may refer to:

- Guayrá, a former region of the Spanish Empire in what is now modern Paraguay and Brazil
- Guaíra Falls, former waterfalls on the Paraná River along the border between Brazil and Paraguay

== Brazil ==
- Guaíra, Paraná
  - Guaíra Airport
- Guaíra, São Paulo

== Paraguay ==
- Guairá Department
- Salto del Guairá, Canindeyú Department

== Venezuela ==
- La Guaira State
  - La Guaira, its capital city

== See also ==
- Guiara, a rodent
