= União da Vitória Airport =

José Cleto Airport Aeroporto José Cleto
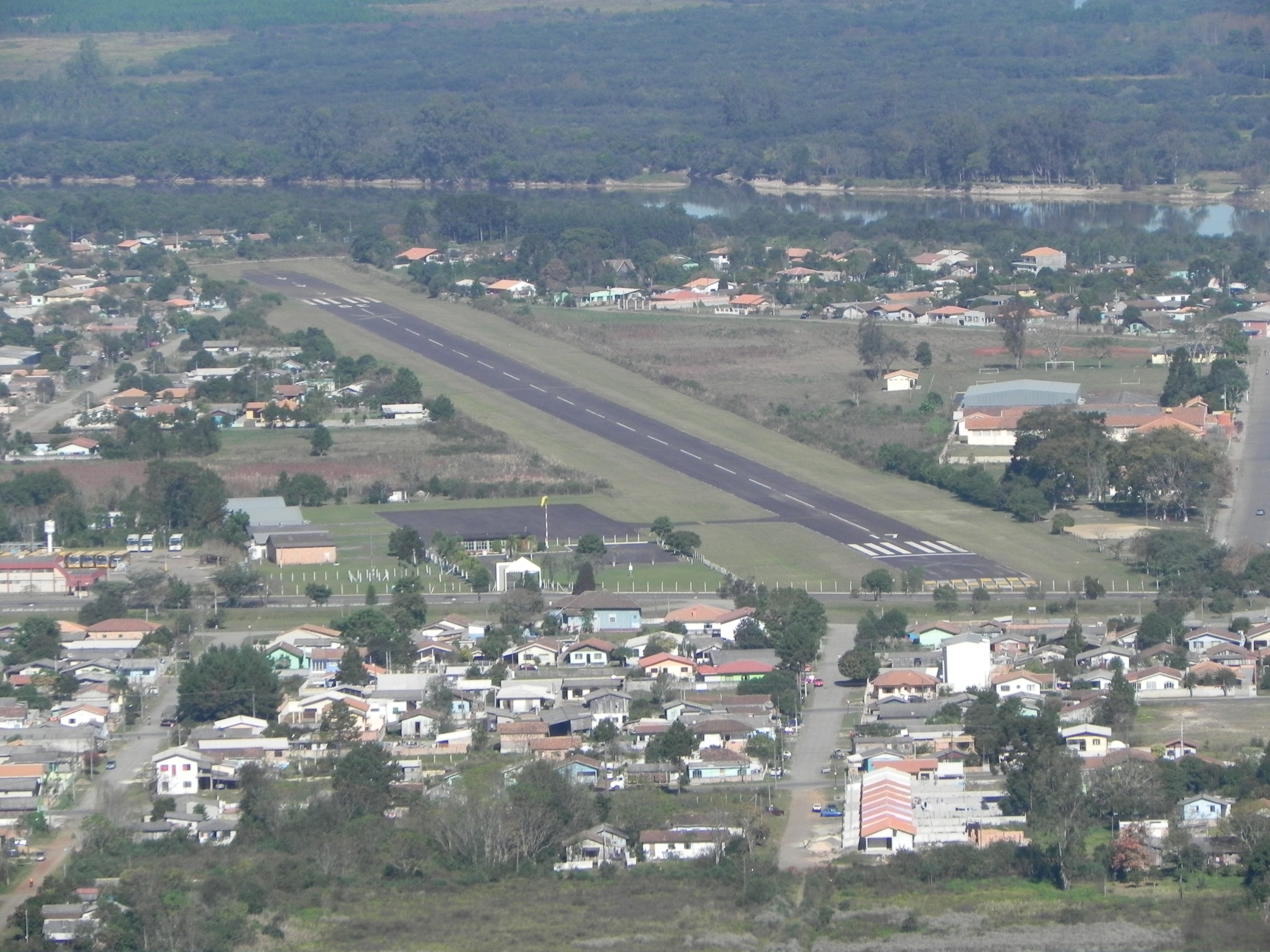
- IATA: UVI; ICAO: SSUV; LID: PR0034

Summary
- Airport type: Public
- Operator: União da Vitória; SEIL
- Serves: União da Vitória
- Time zone: BRT (UTC−03:00)
- Elevation AMSL: 750 m (2,460 ft)
- Coordinates: 26°13′55″S 051°04′03″W

Map
- Location in Brazil UVI (Brazil)

Runways
Direction	Length		Surface
Direction	m	ft	Surface
17/35	755	2,477	Asphalt

Statistics (2011)
- Passengers: 333 ▼38%
- Aircraft Operations: 663 ▲10%
- Statistics: SEIL; Sources: ANAC, DECEA

José Cleto Airport (IATA: UVI, ICAO: SSUV) is the airport serving União da Vitória, Brazil. It is named after José Cleto (1901-1960), a local entrepreneur, politician and film producer and director.

It is operated by the Municipality of União da Vitória under the supervision of Aeroportos do Paraná (SEIL).

== History ==
Between 1912 and 1916, the region around União da Vitória was the site of the Contestado War. At that time, Lieutenant Ricardo João Kirk, a Brazilian aviator, made a demonstration of the use of aircraft in battles to representatives of the Brazilian Army. Convinced by Kirk's demonstration, the Brazilian Government ordered the Army to open airfields in União da Vitória, Canoinhas and Rio Negro, to send aircraft to those cities, and to attack the rebels by dropping bombs.

The aircraft had difficulties to reach their destination, particularly because the train that was carrying the aircraft and troops was attacked by the rebels. As a result, Kirk decided to go himself to União da Vitória equipped with new aircraft and troops.

On March 1, 1915, during his second flight, the one in which he would start destroying villages and other settlements, he crashed in a forest 44 km from União da Vitória while attempting an emergency landing. This crash was the first documented aircraft accident in Brazil.

== Airlines and destinations ==
Airlines	Destinations
Azul Conecta	Curitiba

== Access ==
The airport is located 1 km (1 mi) east from downtown União da Vitória.

== See also ==
- List of airports in Brazil
