= Gastão Mesquita Airport =

Engenheiro Gastão de Mesquita Filho Airport Aeroporto Engenheiro Gastão Mesquita Filho
- IATA: GGH; ICAO: SSCT; LID: PR0025

Summary
- Airport type: Public
- Operator: Cianorte; SEIL
- Serves: Cianorte
- Time zone: BRT (UTC−03:00)
- Elevation AMSL: 540 m (1,770 ft)
- Coordinates: 23°41′30″S 052°38′32″W

Map
- Location in Brazil GGH (Brazil)

Runways
Direction	Length		Surface
Direction	m	ft	Surface
04/22	1,220	4,003	Asphalt

Statistics (2011)
- Passengers: 464 ▼28%
- Aircraft Operations: 226 ▼28%
- Statistics: SEIL; Sources: ANAC, DECEA

Engenheiro Gastão Mesquita Airport (IATA: GGH, ICAO: SSCT) is the airport serving Cianorte, Brazil.

It is operated by the Municipality of Cianorte under the supervision of Aeroportos do Paraná (SEIL).

== Access ==
The airport is located 5 km (3 mi) from downtown Cianorte.

== See also ==
- List of airports in Brazil
