= Ponta Grossa Airport =

Comte. Antonio Amilton Beraldo Airport Aeroporto Comte. Antonio Amilton Beraldo
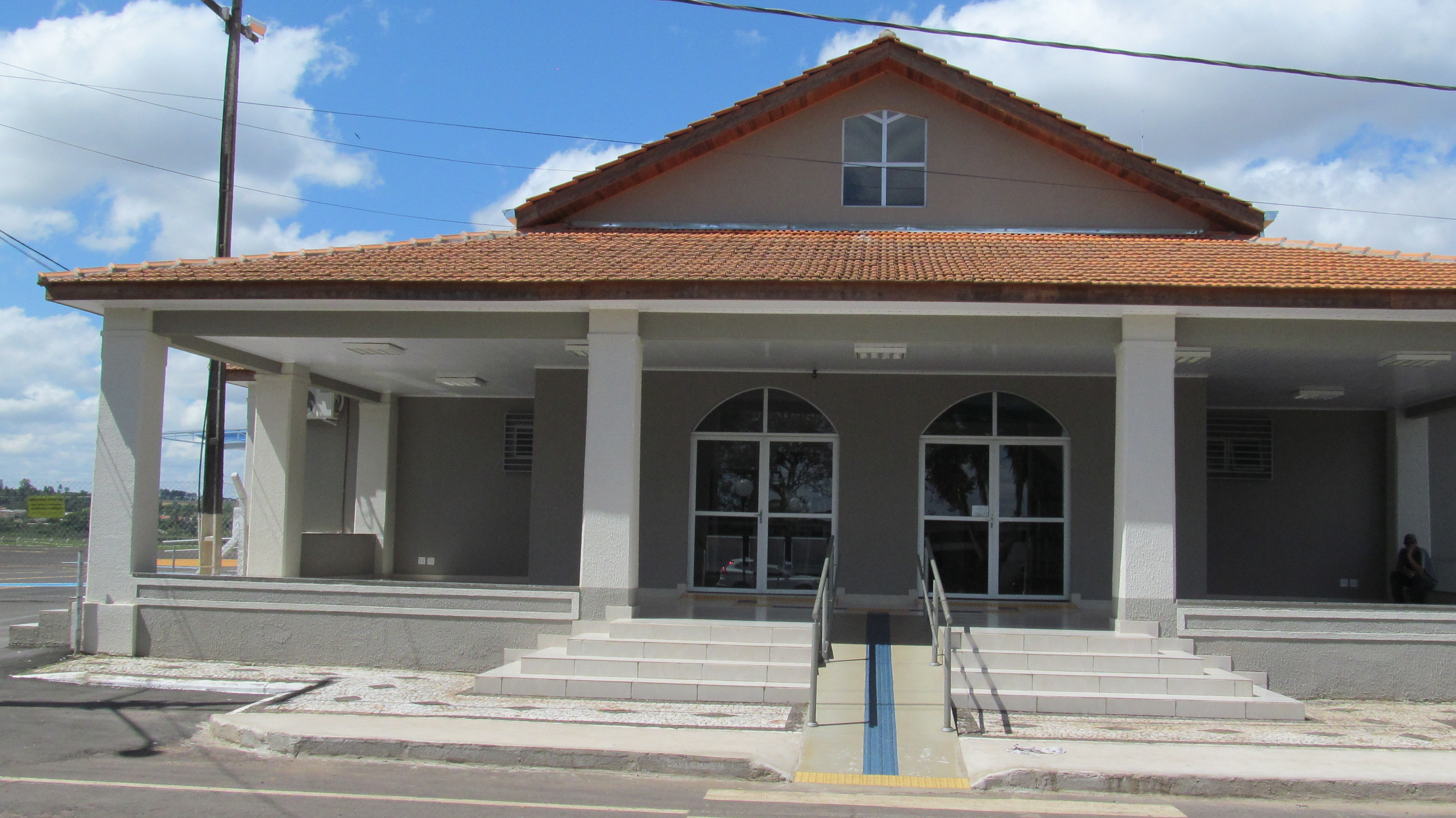
- IATA: PGZ; ICAO: SBPG; LID: PR0012

Summary
- Airport type: Public
- Operator: Ponta Grossa; SEIL
- Serves: Ponta Grossa
- Time zone: BRT (UTC−03:00)
- Elevation AMSL: 789 m / 2,588 ft
- Coordinates: 25°11′04″S 050°08′38″W

Map
- Location in Brazil PGZ (Brazil)

Runways
Direction	Length		Surface
Direction	m	ft	Surface
08/26	1,430	4,692	Asphalt

Statistics (2011)
- Passengers: 1,979 ▼51%
- Aircraft Operations: 3,657 ▲52%
- Statistics: SEIL; Sources: ANAC, DECEA

Comte. Antonio Amilton Beraldo Airport (IATA: PGZ, ICAO: SBPG), formerly SSZW and called Sant'Ana Airport, is the airport serving Ponta Grossa, Brazil.

It is operated by the Municipality of Ponta Grossa under the supervision of Aeroportos do Paraná (SEIL).

== Airlines and destinations ==
No scheduled flights operate at this airport.

== Accidents and incidents ==
- 15 March 1961: a Aeronorte Douglas DC-3 registration PP-YQS operating a flight from São Paulo had to divert to Ponta Grossa because of bad weather at the intended destination. The aircraft crashed into a hill while approaching the runway. Three crew members died.

== Access ==
The airport is located 10 km (6 mi) south from downtown Ponta Grossa.

== See also ==
- List of airports in Brazil
