= Avelino Vieira Airport =

Avelino Vieira Airport Aeroporto Avelino Vieira
- IATA: AAG; ICAO: SSYA

Summary
- Airport type: Public
- Operator: Arapoti; SEIL
- Serves: Arapoti
- Closed: 2020
- Time zone: BRT (UTC−03:00)
- Elevation AMSL: 805 m (2,641 ft)
- Coordinates: 24°06′15″S 049°47′26″W

Map
- Location in Brazil AAG (Brazil)

Runways
Direction	Length		Surface
Direction	m	ft	Surface
05/23	1,400	4,593	Asphalt

Statistics (2011)
- Passengers: 0 ▼100%
- Aircraft Operations: 0 ▼100%
- Statistics: SEIL; Sources: ANAC

Avelino Vieira Airport (IATA: AAG, ICAO: SSYA) is the airport serving Arapoti, Brazil.

It is operated by the Municipality of Arapoti under the supervision of Aeroportos do Paraná (SEIL). It was closed in 2020.

== History ==
On July 13, 2020 the operational license of the facility was revoked. The municipality intends to start a process of re-certification.

== Access ==
The airport is located 6 km (4 mi) northeast from downtown Arapoti.

== See also ==
- List of airports in Brazil
