= Paranavaí Airport =

Edu Chaves Airport Aeroporto Edu Chaves
- IATA: PVI; ICAO: SSPI; LID: PR0010

Summary
- Airport type: Public
- Operator: SEIL (?–2024); Infraero (2024–present)
- Serves: Paranavaí
- Opened: 14 March 1976
- Time zone: BRT (UTC−03:00)
- Elevation AMSL: 474 m (1,555 ft)
- Coordinates: 23°05′24″S 052°29′19″W
- Website: www4.infraero.gov.br/aeroporto-paranavai/

Map
- Location in Brazil PVI (Brazil)

Runways
Direction	Length		Surface
Direction	m	ft	Surface
13/31	1,500	4,921	Asphalt

Statistics (2025)
- Passengers: 1,763
- Aircraft Operations: 1,192
- Statistics: Infraero; Sources: Airport Website, ANAC, DECEA

Edu Chaves Airport (IATA: PVI, ICAO: SSPI) is the airport serving Paranavaí, Brazil.

It is operated by Infraero.

== History ==
On January 18, 2024, the city of Paranavaí signed a contract of operation with Infraero. Previously the airport was operated by Aeroportos do Paraná (SEIL).

== Access ==
The airport is located 4 km (2 mi) from downtown Paranavaí.

== See also ==
- List of airports in Brazil
