= Saint Nicholas Garden Canyon =

Canyon in Paraná, Brazil

Saint Nicholas Garden Canyon (Portuguese: Cânion do Horto São Nicolau) is a canyon in Arapoti, Paraná, Brazil. The canyon has been carved by Rincon Creek, a tributary of the Ash River. The canyon is 6 km (3.7 mi) long and has an average depth of 40 m (130 ft). A Riparian forest flanks the canyon.
