= Umuarama =

- Municipality
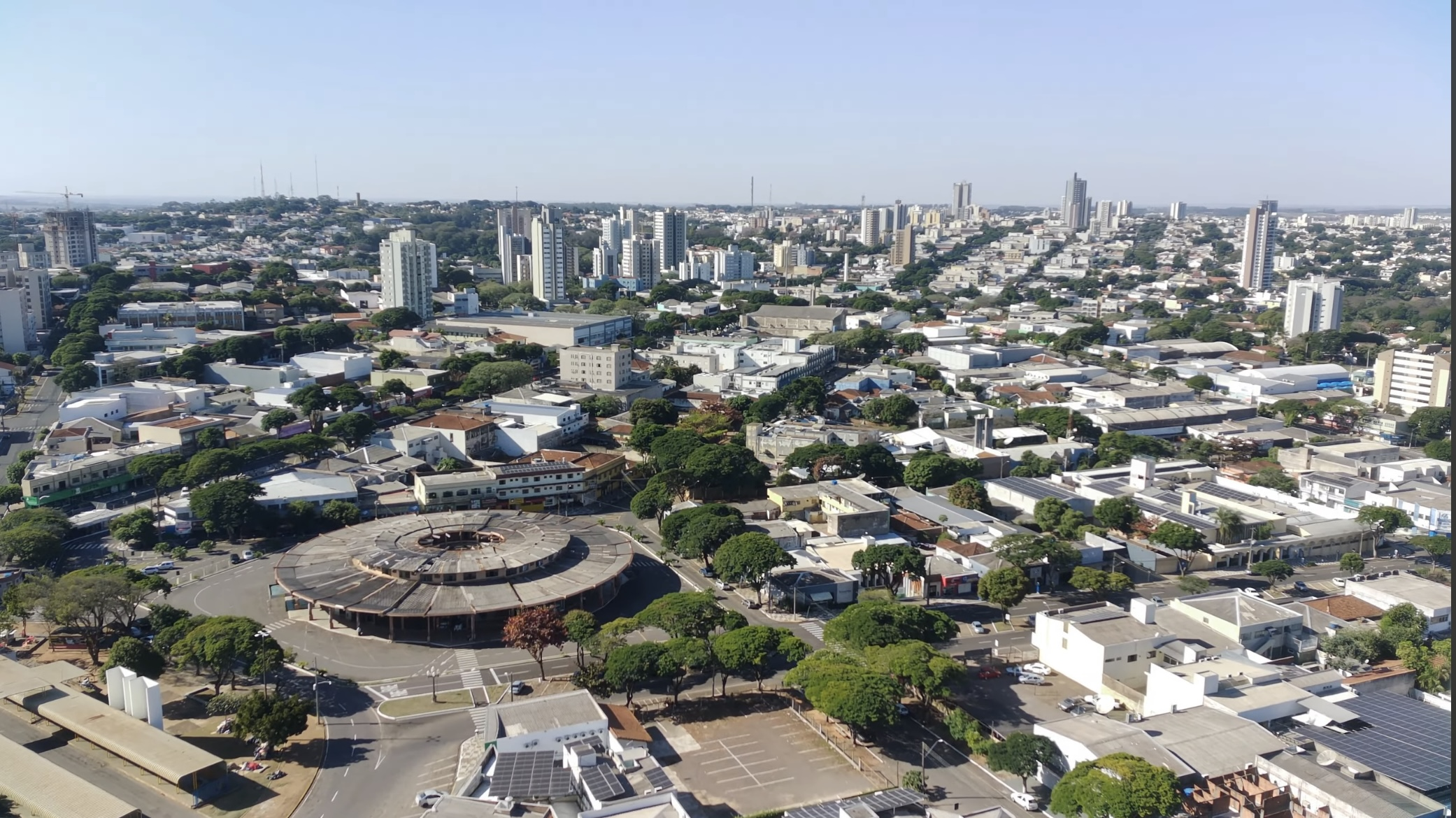

- Flag Coat of arms
- Nickname: Capital da Amizade (Capital of Friendship)

- Location of Umuarama
- Coordinates: 23°45′57″S 53°19′30″W
- Country: Brazil
- Region: South
- State: Paraná
- Founded: July 4, 1955

Government
  - Mayor: Fernando Scanavaca (Republicanos)

Area
  - Total: 1,227.425 km^{2} (473.911 sq mi)
- Elevation: 430 m (1,410 ft)

Population (2022 Census)
  - Total: 117,095
  - Estimate (2025): 123,059
  - Density: 95.3989/km^{2} (247.082/sq mi)
- Time zone: UTC-3
- Postal Code: 87500-000
- HDI (2000): 0.800–high
- Website: www.umuarama.pr.gov.br

Umuarama is a municipality in the state of Paraná in Brazil. Its population was 117,095 inhabitants in 2022 Census. Umuarama is one of the most important cities in Paraná, one of the three states of southern Brazil. The city elevation is 430 m (1,300 feet) above sea level and the rainfall is about 1600mm/year (63 inches/yr). Umuarama is known as "The Capital of Friendship".

== History ==
The municipality was founded in 1955, and colonized by Companhia Melhoramentos Norte do Paraná, a company that settled an important number of cities in Northern Paraná.

== Tourism ==
There are a lot of places to visit in Umuarama, the most important are:

- Expo Umuarama
- Aratimbó Lake
- Uirapuru Park
- Park of Xetas (also known as Indian's Park)
- Streetmarkets
- The replica of Eiffel Tower at the Estância Paris
- Tucuruvi Lake

Umuarama is served by Orlando de Carvalho Airport.

== Numbers ==
- 618 Industries
- 20 Bank agencies
- 7 Hospitals
- 4 Universities (State University of Maringá, Unipar, FGU and Alfa)
- 58 Graduation Courses
- 10 Radio Stations
- 50,569 Vehicles (1.97 inhabitants per vehicle)
- 100,000 Trees

== Climate ==
Climate data for Umuarama, elevation 480 m (1,570 ft), (1972–2020)
Month	Jan	Feb	Mar	Apr	May	Jun	Jul	Aug	Sep	Oct	Nov	Dec	Year
Record high °C (°F)	38.1 (100.6)	38.4 (101.1)	39.8 (103.6)	36.6 (97.9)	34.0 (93.2)	31.8 (89.2)	32.6 (90.7)	36.3 (97.3)	40.1 (104.2)	41.7 (107.1)	39.3 (102.7)	38.8 (101.8)	41.7 (107.1)
Mean daily maximum °C (°F)	30.8 (87.4)	30.7 (87.3)	30.4 (86.7)	28.5 (83.3)	24.9 (76.8)	23.7 (74.7)	24.2 (75.6)	26.1 (79.0)	27.1 (80.8)	28.8 (83.8)	29.9 (85.8)	30.5 (86.9)	28.0 (82.3)
Daily mean °C (°F)	25.2 (77.4)	25.1 (77.2)	24.7 (76.5)	22.7 (72.9)	19.4 (66.9)	18.2 (64.8)	18.2 (64.8)	19.9 (67.8)	21.2 (70.2)	23.2 (73.8)	24.2 (75.6)	24.9 (76.8)	22.2 (72.1)
Mean daily minimum °C (°F)	21.2 (70.2)	21.1 (70.0)	20.5 (68.9)	18.4 (65.1)	15.5 (59.9)	14.3 (57.7)	13.9 (57.0)	15.2 (59.4)	16.6 (61.9)	18.5 (65.3)	19.5 (67.1)	20.6 (69.1)	17.9 (64.3)
Record low °C (°F)	12.1 (53.8)	12.5 (54.5)	8.5 (47.3)	5.1 (41.2)	2.5 (36.5)	0.9 (33.6)	−1.4 (29.5)	0.5 (32.9)	3.2 (37.8)	8.2 (46.8)	9.5 (49.1)	11.5 (52.7)	−1.4 (29.5)
Average precipitation mm (inches)	178.9 (7.04)	164.0 (6.46)	123.7 (4.87)	119.5 (4.70)	150.5 (5.93)	112.4 (4.43)	75.0 (2.95)	77.7 (3.06)	128.0 (5.04)	182.0 (7.17)	166.3 (6.55)	179.8 (7.08)	1,657.8 (65.28)
Average precipitation days (≥ 1.0 mm)	13	12	10	8	9	8	6	7	9	11	10	13	116
Average relative humidity (%)	73	73	70	68	71	70	64	59	61	65	64	72	68
Mean monthly sunshine hours	220.0	200.9	233.2	229.1	204.3	193.4	218.5	226.4	200.4	219.5	235.4	230.8	2,611.9
Source: IDR-Paraná

== Notable people ==
- Haniel Langaro (born 1995), handball player, silver medalist at the Pan American Games
- Rafael Araújo (born 1991), volleyball player, silver medalist at the Pan American Games and at the 2014 World League
