= Arapongas Airport =

Alberto Bertelli Airport Aeroporto Alberto Bertelli
- IATA: APX; ICAO: SSOG; LID: PR0027

Summary
- Airport type: Public
- Operator: Arapongas; SEIL
- Serves: Arapongas
- Time zone: BRT (UTC−03:00)
- Elevation AMSL: 794 m (2,605 ft)
- Coordinates: 23°21′10″S 051°29′30″W

Map
- Location in Brazil APX (Brazil)

Runways
Direction	Length		Surface
Direction	m	ft	Surface
16/34	1,200	3,937	Asphalt

Statistics (2011)
- Passengers: 2,263 ▼11%
- Aircraft Operations: 2,474 ▼10%
- Statistics: SEIL; Sources: ANAC, DECEA

Alberto Bertelli Airport (IATA: APX, ICAO: SSOG) is the airport serving Arapongas, Brazil.

It is operated by the Municipality of Arapongas under the supervision of Aeroportos do Paraná (SEIL).

== Access ==
The airport is located 5 km (3 mi) northwest from downtown Arapongas.

== See also ==
- List of airports in Brazil
