= Telêmaco Borba Airport =

Monte Alegre Airport Aeroporto Monte Alegre
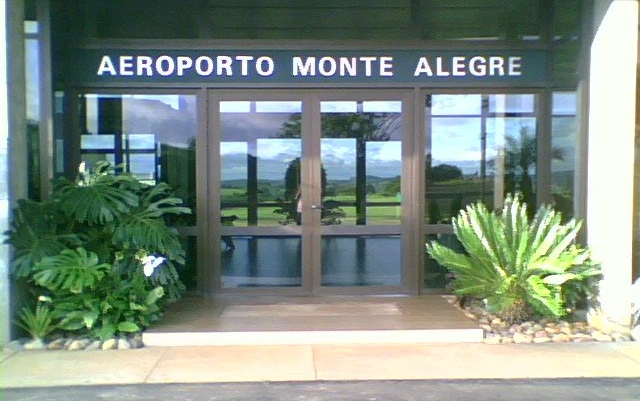
- Monte Alegre Airport
- IATA: TEC; ICAO: SSVL; LID: PR0007

Summary
- Airport type: Public
- Operator: Indústrias Klabin S/A; SEIL
- Serves: Telêmaco Borba
- Time zone: BRT (UTC−03:00)
- Elevation AMSL: 796 m (2,612 ft)
- Coordinates: 24°18′59″S 050°39′08″W

Map
- Location in Brazil TEC (Brazil)

Runways
Direction	Length		Surface
Direction	m	ft	Surface
02/20	1,800	5,906	Asphalt

Statistics (2011)
- Passengers: 2,718 ▲9%
- Aircraft Operations: 1,109 ▲15%
- Statistics: SEIL; Sources: ANAC, DECEA

Telêmaco Borba Airport - Monte Alegre Airport (IATA: TEC, ICAO: SSVL), formerly SBTL is the airport serving Telêmaco Borba, Brazil.

It is operated by Indústrias Klabin S/A under the supervision of Aeroportos do Paraná (SEIL).

== Access ==
The airport is located 3 km (2 mi) northwest from downtown Telêmaco Borba.

== See also ==
- List of airports in Brazil
