= Paranaguá Airport =

Airport serving Paranaguá, Brazil

Santos Dumont Airport Aeroporto Santos Dumont
- IATA: PNG; ICAO: SSPG; LID: PR0004

Summary
- Airport type: Public
- Operator: Paranaguá; SEIL
- Serves: Paranaguá
- Time zone: BRT (UTC−03:00)
- Elevation AMSL: 11 m (36 ft)
- Coordinates: 25°32′25″S 048°31′52″W

Map
- Location in Brazil PNG (Brazil)

Runways
Direction	Length		Surface
Direction	m	ft	Surface
06/24	1,458	4,783	Asphalt

Statistics (2011)
- Passengers: 96 ▲638%
- Aircraft Operations: 331 ▲771%
- Statistics: SEIL; Sources: ANAC, DECEA

Santos Dumont Airport (IATA: PNG, ICAO: SSPG) is the airport serving Paranaguá, Brazil. Like the airport in Rio de Janeiro, it is named after the Brazilian aviation pioneer Alberto Santos Dumont (1873–1932).

It is operated by the Municipality of Paranaguá under the supervision of Aeroportos do Paraná (SEIL).

== Access ==
The airport is located 2 km (1 mi) from downtown Paranaguá.

== See also ==
- List of airports in Brazil
