= Umuarama Airport =

Orlando de Carvalho Airport Aeroporto Orlando de Carvalho
- IATA: UMU; ICAO: SSUM; LID: PR0019

Summary
- Airport type: Public
- Operator: Umuarama SEIL (?–2022); Infracea (2022–present)
- Serves: Umuarama
- Time zone: BRT (UTC−03:00)
- Elevation AMSL: 473 m (1,552 ft)
- Coordinates: 23°47′57″S 053°18′50″W

Map
- Location in Brazil UMU (Brazil)

Runways
Direction	Length		Surface
Direction	m	ft	Surface
04/22	1,430	4,692	Asphalt

Statistics (2011)
- Passengers: 4,691 ▲65%
- Aircraft Operations: 3,011 ▲21%
- Statistics: SEIL; Sources: ANAC, DECEA

Orlando de Carvalho Airport (IATA: UMU, ICAO: SSUM) is the airport serving Umuarama, Brazil.

It is operated by Infracea.

== History ==
On January 25, 2022 Infracea won de concession to operate the airport.

== Access ==
The airport is located 5 km (3 mi) from downtown Umuarama.

== See also ==
- List of airports in Brazil
