= Toledo Airport (Brazil) =

Airport in Brazil

Luiz dal Canalle Filho Airport Aeroporto Luiz dal Canalle Filho
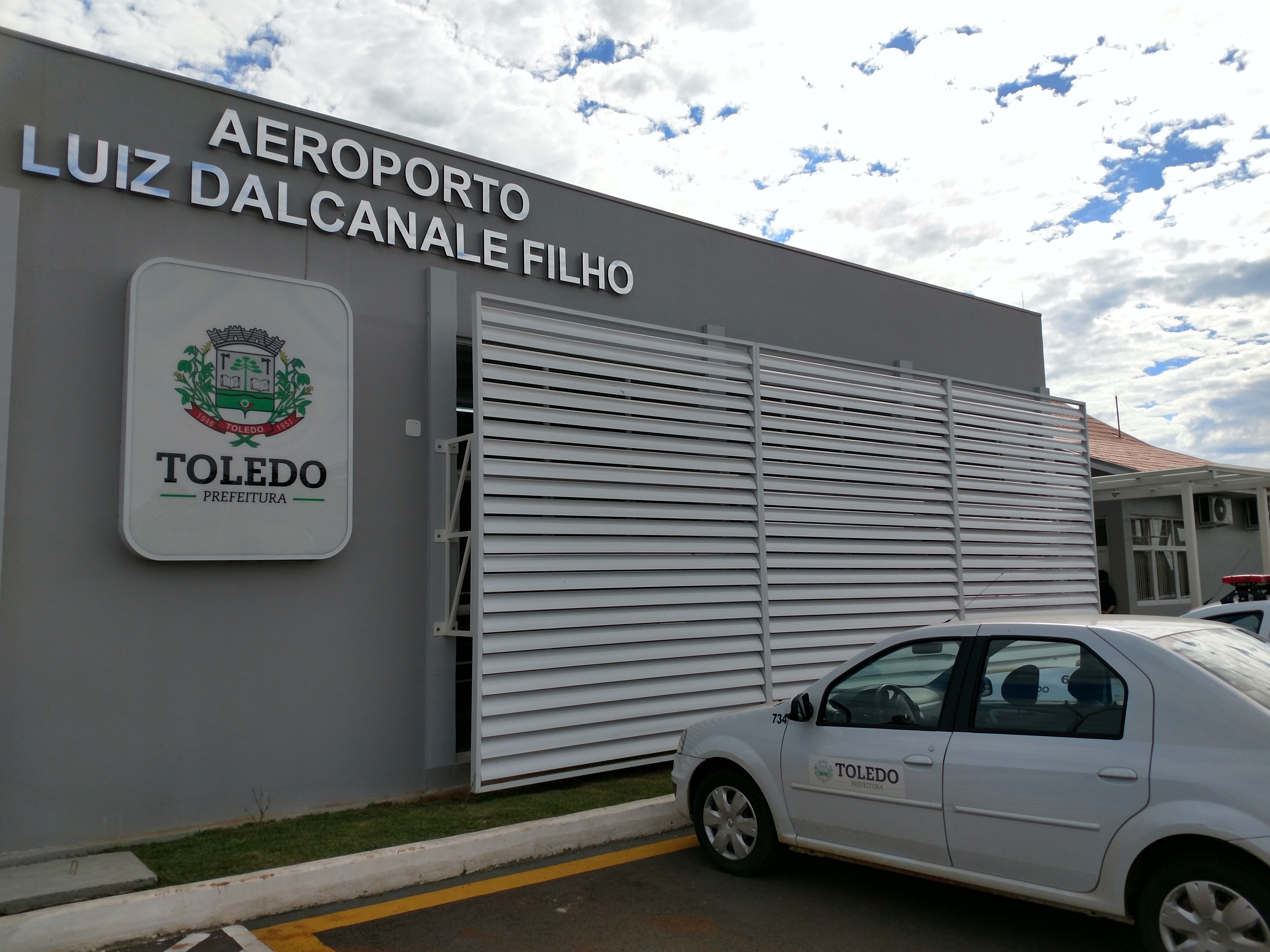
- IATA: TOW; ICAO: SBTD; LID: PR0008

Summary
- Airport type: Public
- Operator: Toledo; SEIL
- Serves: Toledo
- Opened: January 24, 1954
- Time zone: BRT (UTC−03:00)
- Elevation AMSL: 561 m (1,841 ft)
- Coordinates: 24°41′07″S 053°41′47″W

Map
- Location in Brazil TOW (Brazil)

Runways
Direction	Length		Surface
Direction	m	ft	Surface
02/20	1,670	5,479	Asphalt

Statistics (2009)
- Passengers: 719 ▼75%
- Aircraft Operations: 349 ▼75%
- Statistics: SEIL; Sources: ANAC, DECEA

Luiz dal Canalle Filho Airport (IATA: TOW, ICAO: SBTD) is the airport serving Toledo, Brazil.

It is operated by the Municipality of Toledo under the supervision of Aeroportos do Paraná (SEIL).

== History ==
The airport was commissioned on January 24, 1954.

== Access ==
The airport is located 6 km (4 mi) northeast from downtown Toledo.

== See also ==
- List of airports in Brazil
