= Cornélio Procópio Airport =

Francisco Lacerda Junior Airport Aeroporto Francisco Lacerda Junior
- IATA: CKO; ICAO: SSCP; LID: PR0015

Summary
- Airport type: Public
- Operator: Cornélio Procópio; SEIL
- Serves: Cornélio Procópio
- Time zone: BRT (UTC−03:00)
- Elevation AMSL: 567 m (1,860 ft)
- Coordinates: 23°09′09″S 050°36′09″W

Map
- Location in Brazil CKO (Brazil)

Runways
Direction	Length		Surface
Direction	m	ft	Surface
06/24	1,400	4,593	Asphalt

Statistics (2011)
- Passengers: 186 ▼49%
- Aircraft Operations: 177 ▼10%
- Statistics: SEIL; Sources: ANAC, DECEA

Francisco Lacerda Junior Airport (IATA: CKO, ICAO: SSCP) is the airport serving Cornélio Procópio, Brazil.

It is operated by the Municipality of Cornélio Procópio under the supervision of Aeroportos do Paraná (SEIL).

== Access ==
The airport is located 6 km (4 mi) from downtown Cornélio Procópio.

== See also ==
- List of airports in Brazil
