= Maringá Regional Airport =

Sílvio Name Júnior Regional Airport Aeroporto Regional Sílvio Name Júnior
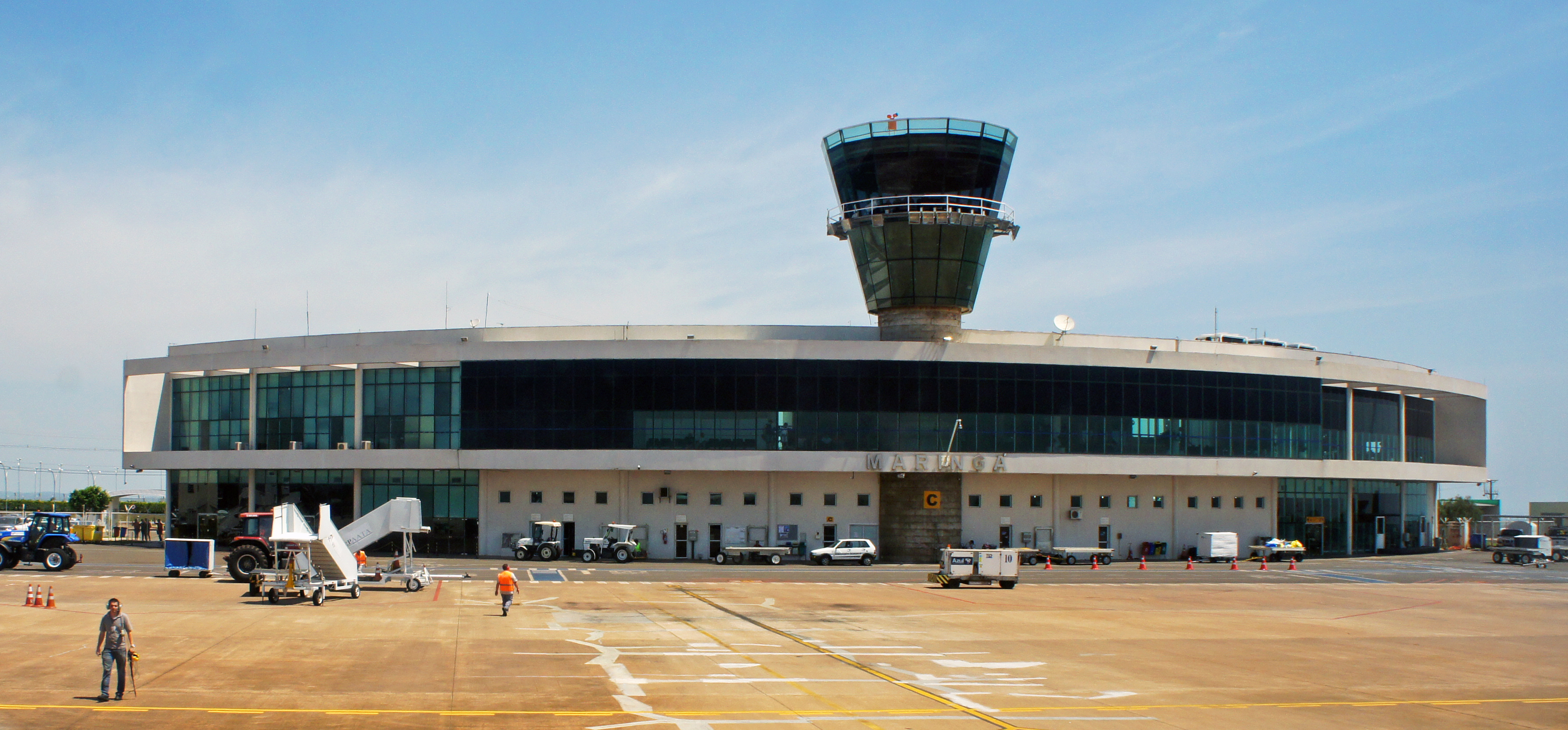
- IATA: MGF; ICAO: SBMG; LID: PR0004

Summary
- Airport type: Public
- Operator: Terminais Aéreos de Maringá – SBMG S.A. SEIL
- Serves: Maringá
- Opened: 25 April 2001; 25 years ago
- Time zone: BRT (UTC−03:00)
- Elevation AMSL: 549 m (1,801 ft)
- Coordinates: 23°28′35″S 052°01′04″W
- Website: aeroportomaringa.com.br

Map
- Location in Brazil MGF (Brazil)

Runways
Direction	Length		Surface
Direction	m	ft	Surface
10/28	2,380	7,808	Asphalt

Statistics (2011)
- Passengers: 677,264 ▲33%
- Aircraft Operations: 16,726 ▲10%
- Statistics: SEIL; Sources: Airport Website, ANAC, DECEA

Sílvio Name Júnior Regional Airport (IATA: MGF, ICAO: SBMG), is the airport serving Maringá, Brazil. It is named after Sílvio Name Júnior (1967-2000), a local businessman and politician who died in a plane crash.

It is operated by Terminais Aéreos de Maringá – SBMG, a semi-independent Transportation Authority of Maringá, indirectly related to the Municipality of Maringá, and under the supervision of Aeroportos do Paraná (SEIL).

== History ==
The airport was built as a replacement to Dr. Gastão Vidigal Regional Airport, which was closed.

The facility was built between October, 1994 and September 16, 2000. It began operating on April 25, 2001.

Its terminal is designed to handle more than 430,000 passengers per year.

== Airlines and destinations ==
Airlines	Destinations
Azul Brazilian Airlines	Campinas, Curitiba; Seasonal: Maceió
Gol Linhas Aéreas	Curitiba, São Paulo–Congonhas, São Paulo–Guarulhos
LATAM Brasil	São Paulo–Congonhas, São Paulo–Guarulhos

== Access ==
The airport is located 12 km (7 mi) from downtown Maringá.

== See also ==
- List of airports in Brazil

== Gallery ==
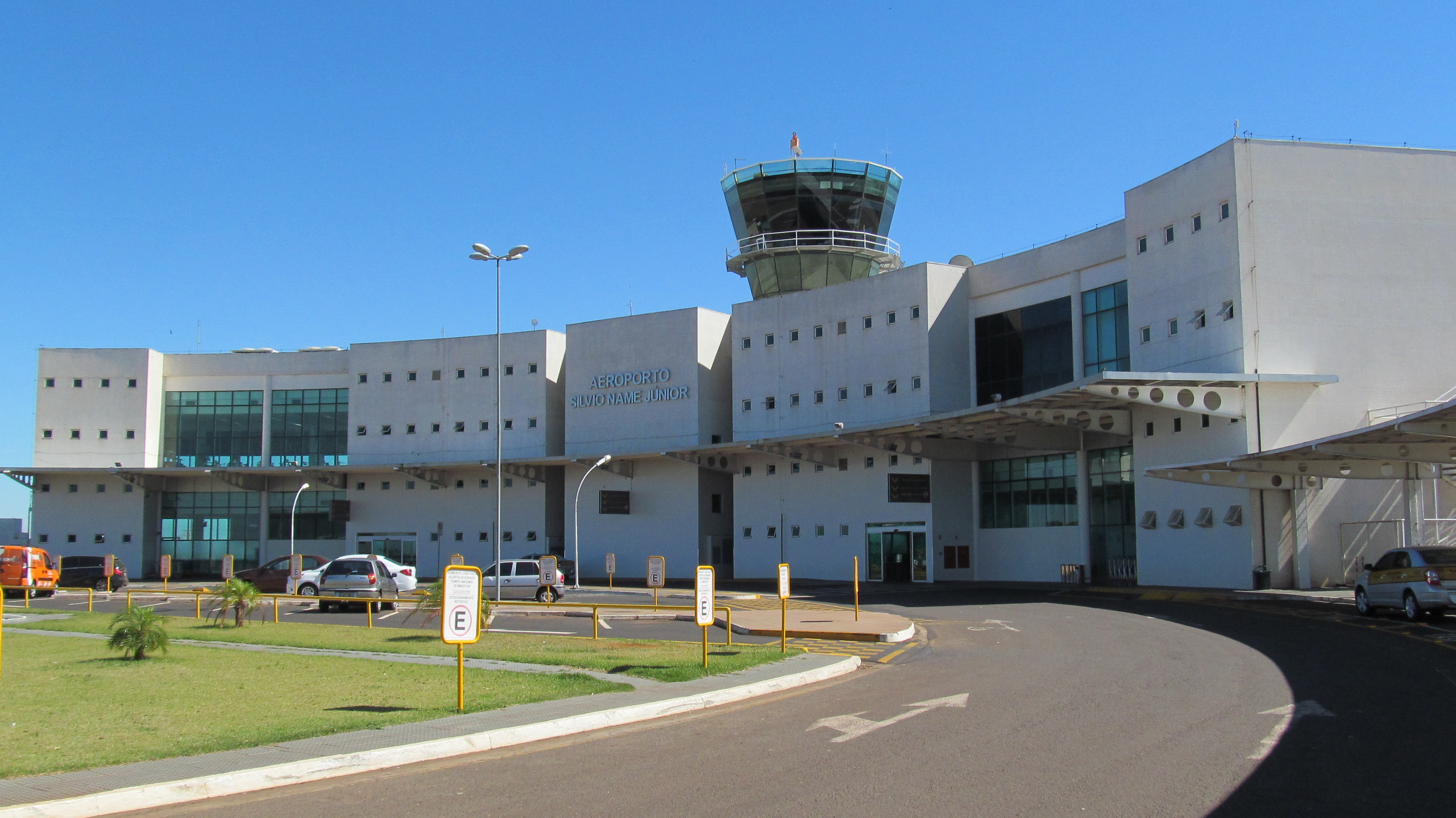
Airport landside

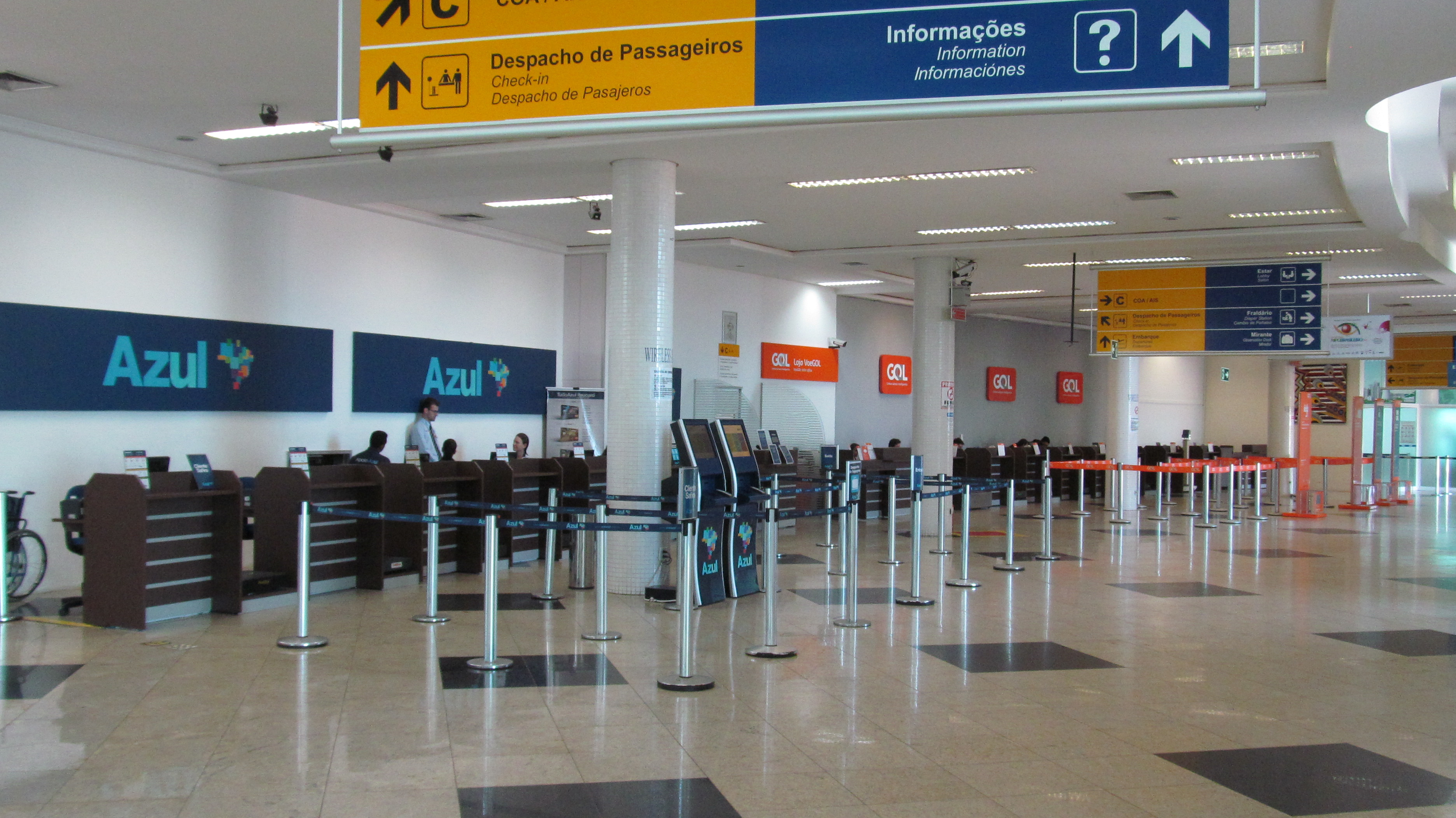
Check-in area
