= União da Vitória =

- city
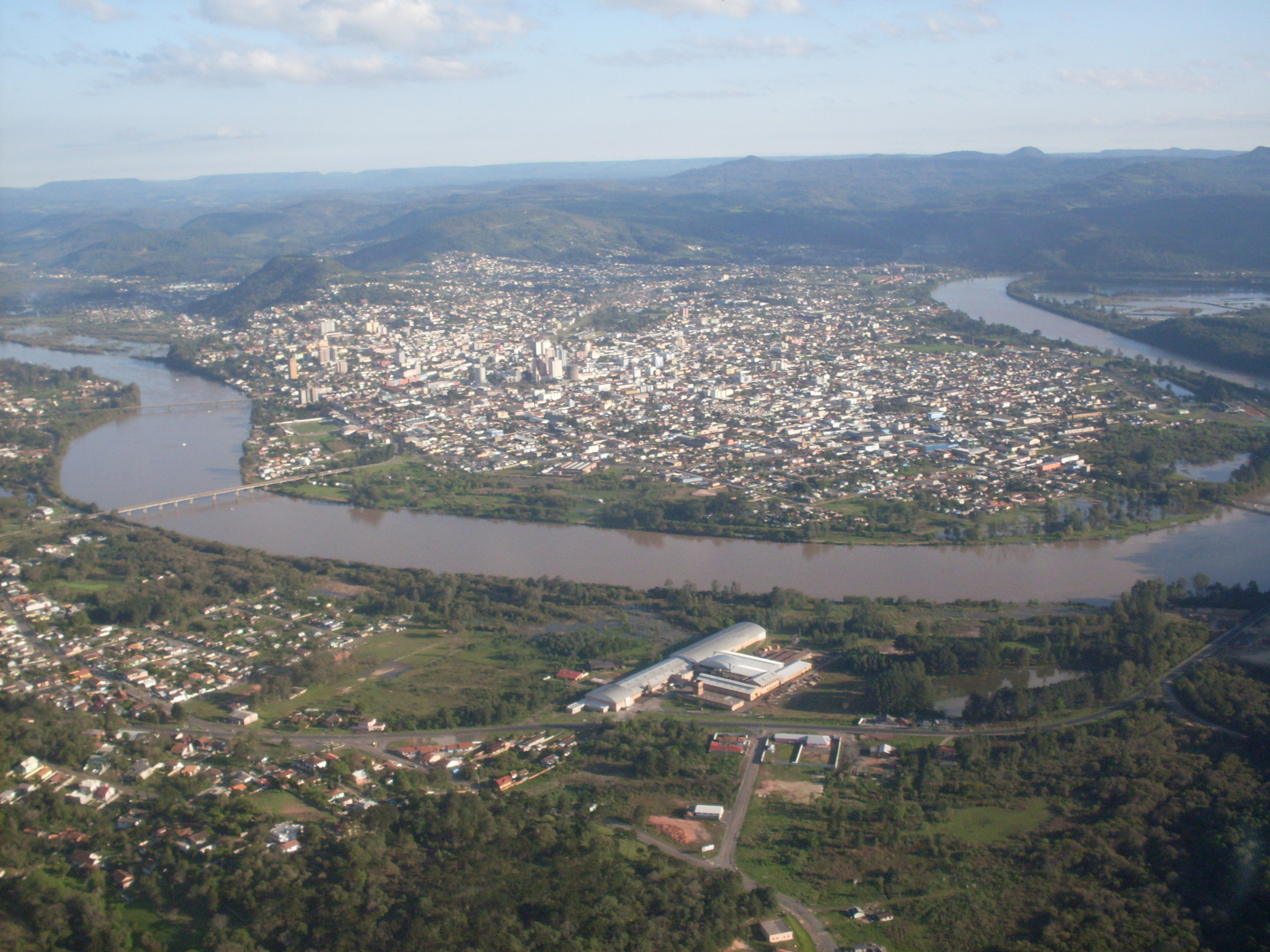
- União da Vitória downtown

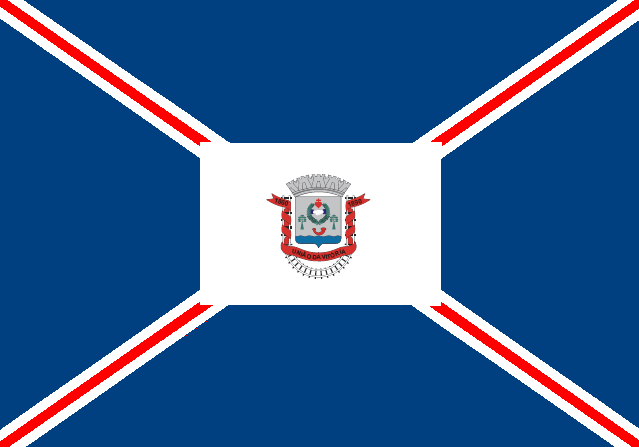
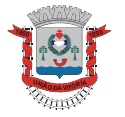
- Flag Coat of arms

- Location in Paraná, Brazil

- Location within Brazil
- Coordinates: 26°13′S 51°05′W
- Country: Brazil
- Region: South
- State: Paraná

Government
  - Mayor: Bachir Abbas (Progressistas, 2021-2024)

Area
  - Total: 720 km^{2} (280 sq mi)
- Elevation: 752 m (2,467 ft)

Population (2020)
  - Total: 57,913
  - Density: 72/km^{2} (190/sq mi)
- Time zone: UTC-3 (UTC-3)
  - Summer (DST): UTC-2 (UTC-2)
- Website: Prefeitura de União da Vitória

União da Vitória is a municipality in the state of Paraná in Brazil. Its population was about 57,913 people in 2020. In the economic area, União da Vitória's GDP (Gross Domestic Product) is US$115,364,648.65.

== History ==
The colonization of the region begun in the end of the 19th century with the troops that usually came from the central villages of Rio Grande do Sul in order to sell their bovines in the Southeast Region larger cities, such as Sorocaba, due to the discovery of a shallow passage in the middle of Iguazu River called "Vau do Iguaçu". Years later, on March 27, 1890, dismembered of Palmas, the city of União da Vitória was founded.

After that, European immigrants, such as Ukrainians, Poles, Germans and Italians settled with their families in the region, attracted mainly by the similar climate, topography, vegetation and opportunity of having a better quality of life.

In the early 20th century, the Contestado War, a conflict that Paraná, Santa Catarina and Argentina contested the region rich in "erva mate" and crossed by an important railway. Due to the war, the area had been completely destroyed; so that, the existent city of União da Vitória, at the Iguazu Valley, started its renovation and development.

In the 1950s, the city was getting larger and the economy increasing by wood and yerba mate production and the beginning of this products exportation; but its golden age did not last long.

Nowadays, the latest immigrations were mainly Lebanese Arabs and Jews.

== Development ==
União da Vitória's HDI is of 0.793, classified as medium at this kind of measure.

Its quality of life is one of the best in Paraná. The literacy rate, number of houses with water, sewage treatment and electricity are all over 90% of application in the city.

== Economy ==
Mainly based in the wood industry, internationally known for its wooden furniture, which is exported all over the world including the United States and Europe.

The tourist attractions are also explored; its waterfalls (more than eighty documented) are organized in a guided route with boat and car trip, kayak and trekking, called "Rota das Cachoeiras" (Route of the Waterfalls) visited by many people from the country.

The city is widely known for its universities in the Southern Region of Brazil, gathering a large quantity of students from the south of Paraná and the north of Santa Catarina.

== Geography ==
União da Vitória lies on the south bank of Iguazu River and at 752 meters above the sea level. The city borders its interstate neighbour Porto União, Santa Catarina; both are known as "Gêmeas do Iguaçu" (Iguazu Twins).

The city is 238 kilometers far from Curitiba, the capital of Paraná State and the municipality's area is of 720 square kilometers and the population density is of 72 people per square kilometer.

Being located between the Second and the Third Plateaus, the city's topography is characterized by extrusive igneous mountains origined in the Paraná Flood Basalt; making this region full of waterfalls and creeks nationally known.

=== Climate ===
União da Vitória has a subtropical Cfa-type with hot summers and rainy months

Climate data for Porto União
Month	Jan	Feb	Mar	Apr	May	Jun	Jul	Aug	Sep	Oct	Nov	Dec	Year
Mean daily maximum °C (°F)	25.8 (78.4)	25.7 (78.3)	24.8 (76.6)	22.8 (73.0)	19.0 (66.2)	18.2 (64.8)	18.2 (64.8)	20.4 (68.7)	21.7 (71.1)	23.1 (73.6)	23.9 (75.0)	25.5 (77.9)	22.4 (72.3)
Daily mean °C (°F)	22.3 (72.1)	22.2 (72.0)	21.3 (70.3)	19.1 (66.4)	15.5 (59.9)	14.4 (57.9)	14.0 (57.2)	15.5 (59.9)	17.2 (63.0)	19.1 (66.4)	20.0 (68.0)	21.6 (70.9)	18.5 (65.3)
Mean daily minimum °C (°F)	18.7 (65.7)	18.7 (65.7)	17.8 (64.0)	15.4 (59.7)	11.9 (53.4)	10.5 (50.9)	9.7 (49.5)	10.6 (51.1)	12.6 (54.7)	15.1 (59.2)	16.1 (61.0)	17.7 (63.9)	14.5 (58.1)
Average rainfall mm (inches)	171.0 (6.73)	157.0 (6.18)	111.0 (4.37)	89.0 (3.50)	101.0 (3.98)	100.0 (3.94)	90.0 (3.54)	79.0 (3.11)	149.0 (5.87)	160.0 (6.30)	124.0 (4.88)	143.0 (5.63)	1,474 (58.03)
Average relative humidity (%)	83.0	85.0	84.0	83.0	84.0	86.0	83.0	80.0	79.0	82.0	81.0	81.0	82.6
Source 1: Instituto Nacional de Meteorologia (temperature records: 1975 to 1984 and 1993 to 2013).
Source 2: Climate Data (Precipitation and temperature average) and Departamento de Ciências Atmosféricas (relative humidity).

== Transportation ==
The city is served by José Cleto Airport.

== See also ==
- Roman Catholic Diocese of União da Vitória
