= Centenário do Sul =

Coordinates: 22°48′S 51°37′W

- Municipality
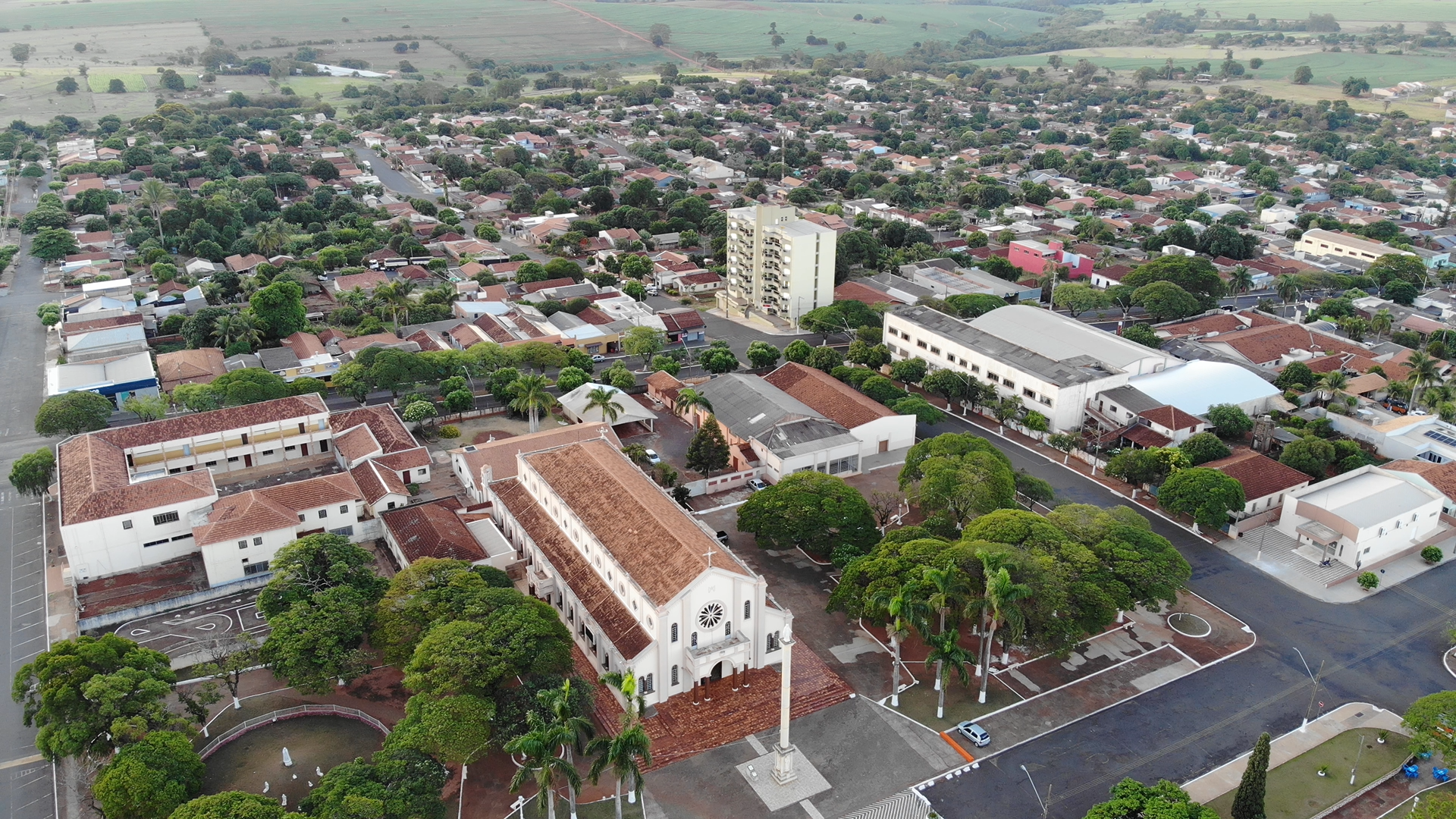

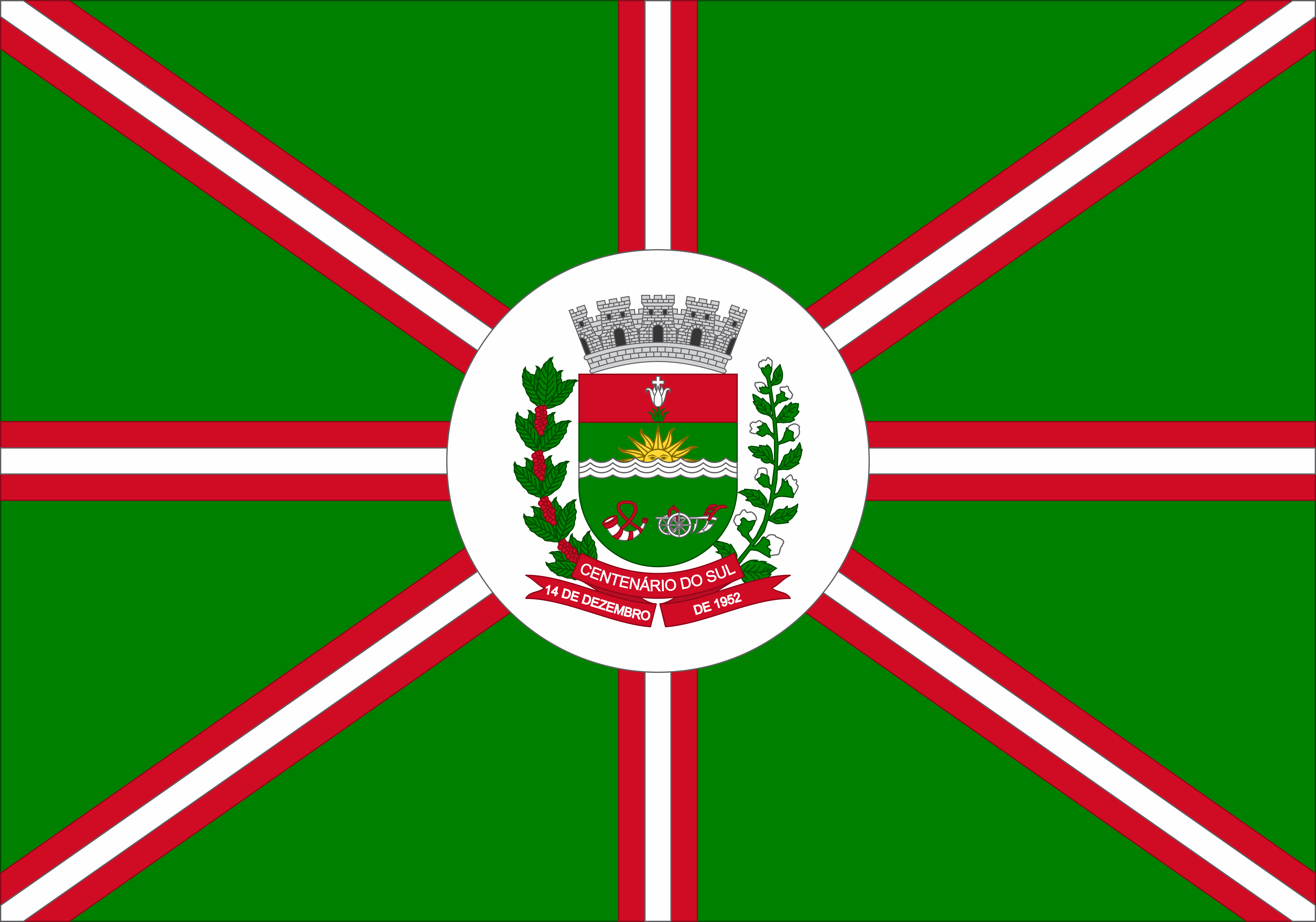
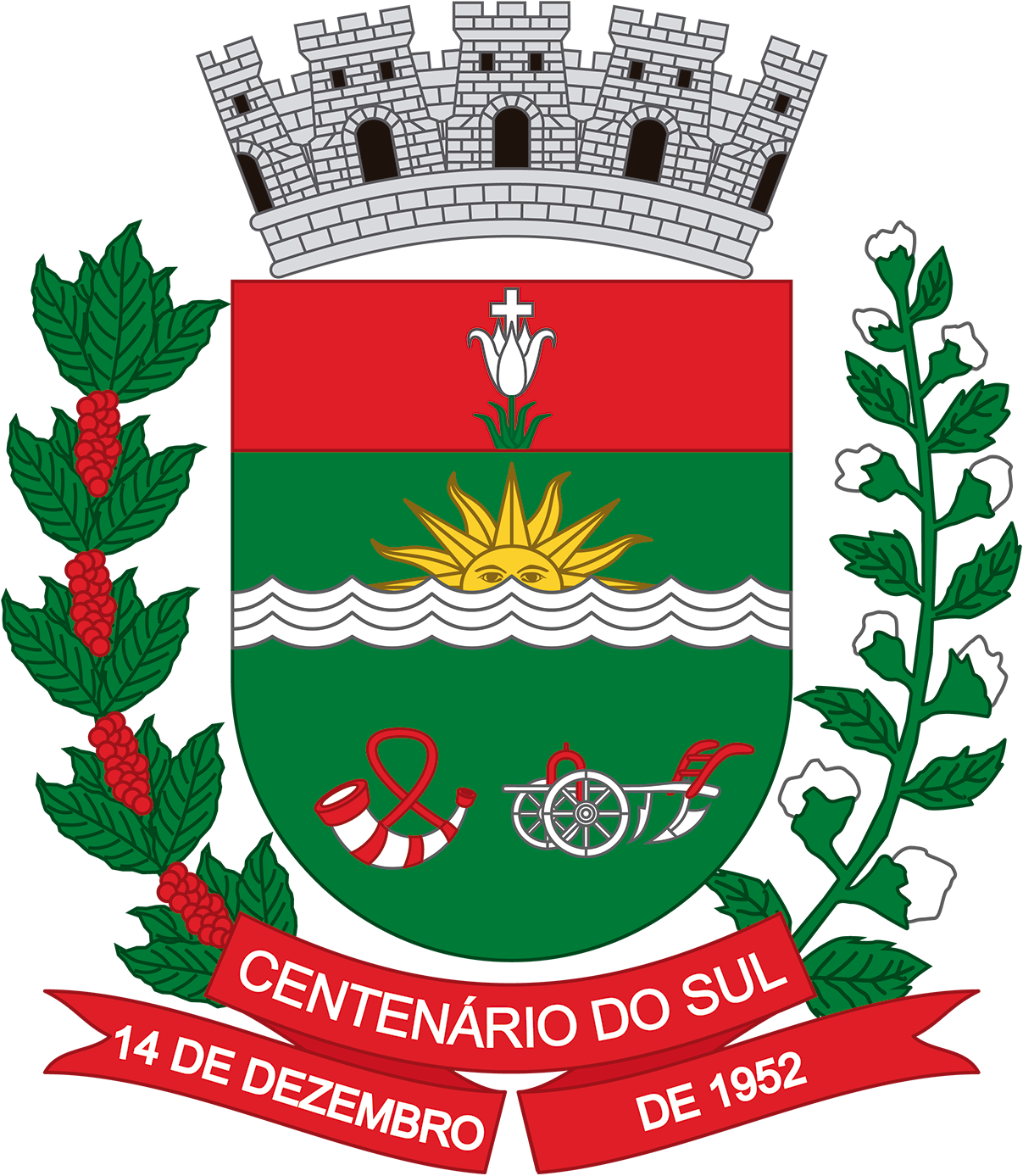
- Flag Coat of arms

- Country: Brazil
- Region: Southern
- State: Paraná
- Mesoregion: Noroeste Paranaense

Population (2020)
  - Total: 10,764
- Time zone: UTC−3 (BRT)

Centenário do Sul is a municipality in the state of Paraná in the Southern Region of Brazil.

== See also ==
- List of municipalities in Paraná
