= Arapongas =

Arapongas, Paraná, Brazil
- Municipality
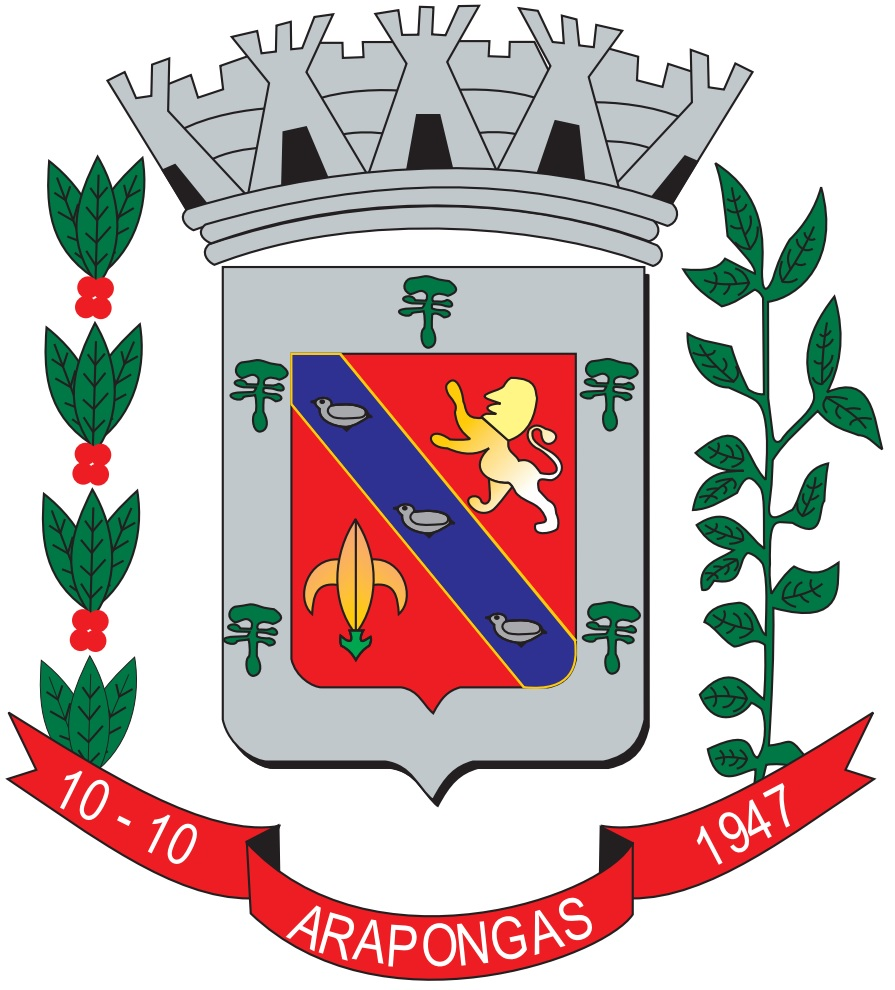
- Flag Coat of arms

- Location in Paraná

- Location in Brazil
- Coordinates: 23°25′08″S 51°25′26″W
- Country: Brazil
- State: Paraná
- Mesoregion: Central North Paranaense
- Microregion: Apucarana
- Founded: October 10, 1947

Government
  - Mayor: Sérgio Onofre da Silva (PSC)

Area
  - Total: 381.091 km^{2} (147.140 sq mi)
- Elevation: 816 m (2,677 ft)

Population (2022 Census)
  - Total: 119,138
  - Estimate (2025): 124,838
  - Density: 272.49/km^{2} (705.7/sq mi)
- Demonym: araponguense

GDP
  - Year: 2013 estimate
  - Total: R$ 3 821 175 mil
  - Per capita: R$ 34 057,43

HDI
  - Year: 2010
  - Category: 0,748 – high
- Time zone: UTC-3 (BRT)
  - Summer (DST): UTC-2 (BRST)
- Postal Code: 86000-000
- Area code: +55 43
- Website: Official website

Arapongas is a municipality within the state of Paraná, South Region, Brazil. It is located in the Metropolitan area of Londrina, Microregion Apucarana and Mesoregion North Central Paranaense, being located at a distance of 386 km from the state capital, Curitiba. It occupies an area of approximately 382 km^{2}. In 2022 Census, its population was estimated by the Brazilian Institute of Geography and Statistics in 119,138 inhabitants, the sixteenth-most populous city of Paraná, and second-most populous metropolitan area of Londrina.

== Geography ==
=== Climate ===
The climate is subtropical humid mesothermal, hot summers with rain falling mostly trend (average temperature above 22 °C), winters with little frequent frosts (average temperature below 18 °C) without a defined dry season.

=== Relief ===
- Relief predominantly flat with slight elevations
- Rivers: Ribeirão Pirapó, Lageado Stream, Stream Tres Bocas, Stream of Tight, Basin dos Bandeirantes

== Demography ==
Between 2000 and 2010, the population of Arapongas grew at an annual average rate of 2.00%, while Brazil's population growth was 1.17% in the same period. In this decade, the city's urbanization rate increased from 95.74% to 97.79%. In 2010, 104,150 people lived in the city.

Between 1991 and 2000, the city's population grew at an annual average rate of 3.16%. At UF, this rate was 1.39%, while Brazil's population growth was 1.63% in the same period. In the decade, the city's urbanization rate increased from 92.98% to 95.74%.

Between 2000 and 2010, the dependency ratio in the city rose from 47.22% to 41.23% and the rate of aging, from 6.16% to 8.09%.

- Economically active population of Arapongas: 57,754 (55.45%) (IBGE – Demographic Census 2010).

Ethnicity	Percentage
White	75,6%
Parda	19,9%
Black	2,92%
Yellow	1,35%
Native	0,09%
Fonte: IPARDES 2010

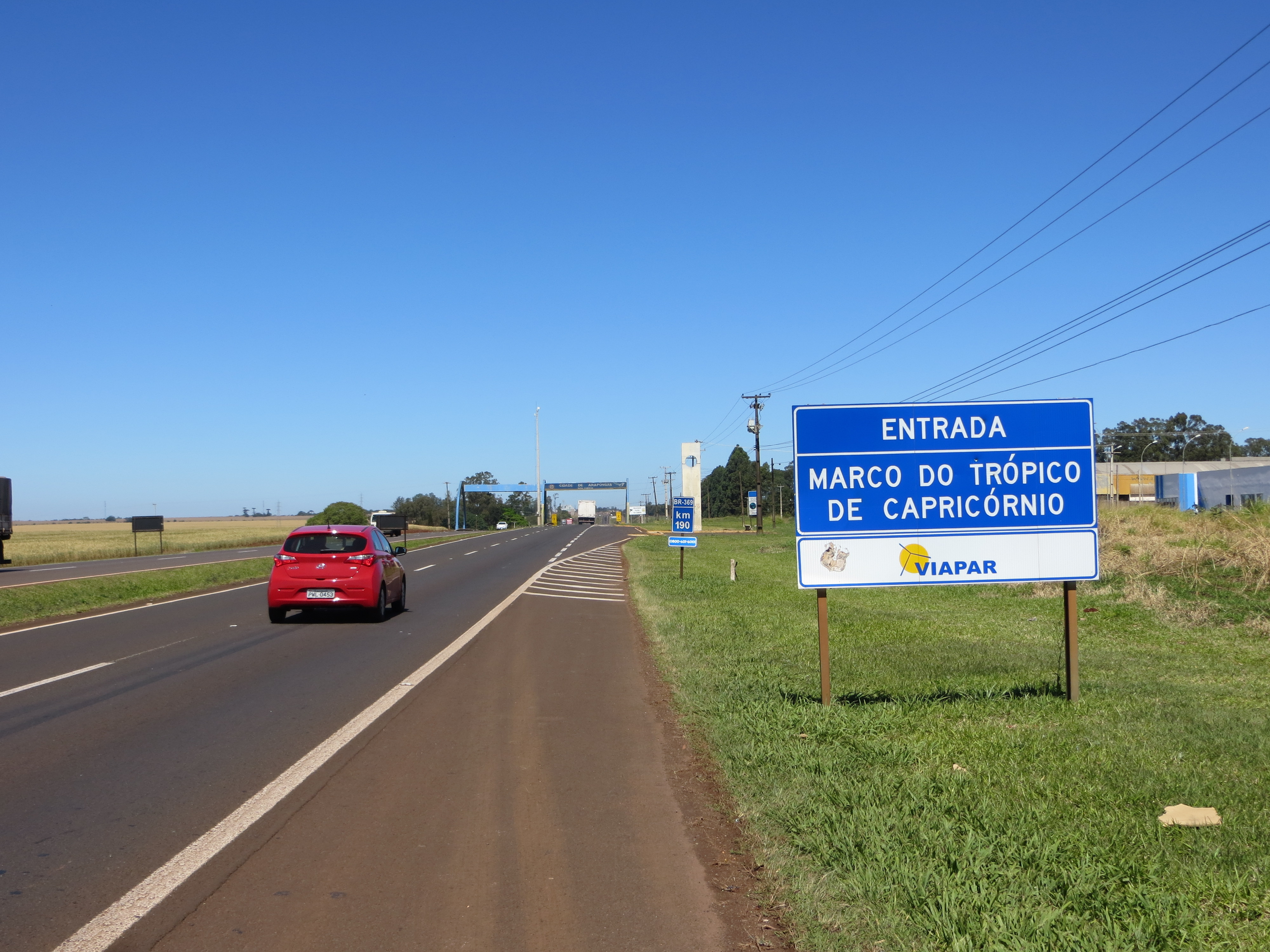
Tropic of Capricorn

=== Tropic of Capricorn ===
The Tropic of Capricorn is a parallel situated south of the equator and the imaginary line crosses the territory of Arapongas, in BR-369, exit to Apucarana. On site there is a composite structure of shoulders and a landmark, where travelers usually stop to register their year here, through photos and videos, or out of curiosity.

== Education ==
Currently, the city has a total of 25 municipal schools, 14 state schools, 16 children's educational centers, 12 private teaching centers, and five universities.

According to the ENEM 1500, the College Prisma is the county's school better positioned to Note 25.83, and the 758 in the overall standings of Paraná.

=== First school ===
The School Group Caravelas Marquis, former School of Arapongas Group, was founded in 1943, even before the city of Arapongas was created in the government of Mayor Miguel Blasi, of Londrina and the governor of the state Moysés Lupion. It was built thanks to the efforts of the pioneers: Antonio Garcez Novaes, Deodato Antero France and others who organized raising materials, as well as work done by villagers.

=== Special education ===
CAE "Service Center and expertise to the Visually Impaired and Hearing" works within the Caravelas Marquis State College one Expertise Center students with Hearing Impairment and Visual. There they develop projects for inclusion and overcoming limits.

=== Higher education ===
Spies has five schools: one public and four private.

- UAB – Open University of Brazil
- Unopar – North Paraná University
- Cesumar – University Center of Maringa
- Unipar – University Paranaense
- Rhema School Education – Rhema Group Education

== Transport ==
=== Road ===
Highways passing Arapongas
PR-218	Sabáudia » Arapongas
BR-369	Apucarana » Arapongas » Londrina
PR-444	Toll Plaza Arapongas » Toll Plaza Mandaguari

=== Airway ===
Alberto Bertelli Airport, known as Arapongas Airport (IATA: APX – ICAO: SSOG) is a public airport administered by the city of Arapongas, with up to 200 takeoffs and landings per month.

The airport is located 5 km northwest from downtown Arapongas. There are currently no scheduled flights operating out of this airport.

=== Fleet ===
In 2015 Arapongas' fleet was the first state's largest tenth with 76,262 vehicles (October 2015 position).

== Culture ==
=== Theatres ===
The most important theaters are:

- Cine Teatro Maua
- Teatro Vianinha
- Teatro Hideo Mihara – Colégio Marquês de Caravelas

=== Cinemas ===
The most important are:

- Cine Mauá
- Cine Gracher (a 3D room and two rooms in digital format stadium) – Havan Arapongas

=== Museums ===
The Museum of Art and History of Arapongas (MAHRA), located in a historic building, which housed from 1955 to 2010, the municipal administration, the MAHRA tells the story of Arapongas through photos and documents that are part of a rich historical collection that is now accessible to the population. The museum will also be a venue for major exhibitions by local artists and guests from other regions.

== Sports ==
The Municipal Stadium José Luis Chiapin is a football stadium with a capacity of 10,440 people. Known as the Stadium of Birds due to the huge flow of birds in the city, and the city itself have the Bird City nickname, is the home of Arapongas Esporte Clube and Grêmio Sports Araponguense, underwent a refurbishment in April 2009 to Arapongas games in the Access Division of the Paranaense Football Championship.

The city of Arapongas has two clubs in the Campeonato Paranaense, the Arapongas Esporte Clube and Grêmio Araponguense. In the past there were others too, like Arapongas Football Club and the Athletic Association Arapongas.

== Tourism ==
=== Parque dos Pássaros ===
The Parque dos Pássaros was created in 2000 by the city of Arapongas. When created, several schools helped with their students to plant trees.

The name was given by a child in a municipal contest schools, integrated to decide the park's name, in which various names were mentioned and Bird Park was chosen.

It offers a variety of entertainment such as: walking inside the park, football field inside the park, skate park, biking, and fishing (when released for public employees).

In 2014, was made major reforms in the park, from paintings, exchange picket fences, lighting, species management, fruit tree planting, maintenance of flora and fauna, cleaning malls, among others.

=== Praça Mauá ===
Dr. Julio Square Junqueira was the first to be built in Arapongas. It was named after Dr. Julio Junqueira, the first mayor of Arapongas.

Located in the city center, the square is popularly called Praça Mauá. It also contains a children's playground.

=== Expoara ===
The Arapongas Exhibition Pavilion – Expoara – is the largest complex in southern Brazil in area for large trade shows and events. Headquartered in the city of Arapongas (northern Parana) – the second-largest furniture hub in Brazil – and the BR 369 which is the main highway to the south, the Expoara is in the Mercosur route, covering a radius of 100 km – between the cities of Londrina and Maringa – a population of 2 million.

Built in 1997, the pavilion was built to accomplish great fair for the furniture sector as Movelpar – Fair of the State of Paraná Furniture – event that is among the three largest trade fairs in the country, and the FIQ International Fair of Quality in Machines, Raw Materials and Accessories for the Furniture Industry, biannual events that attract exhibitors and visitors from the furniture sector nationwide.

Designed on a flat area, Expoara can be divided into various sizes, meeting the need for different formats of events. The pavilion has 44 000 m2, designed on a plot of 150 000 m2, as well as complete infrastructure for events – electricity, hydro, sewer and telephone in all stands – offers a food court with restaurants for 600 people, sound system, equipped auditorium for 300 seats and 5,000 parking spaces.

== Economy ==
Its economy is one of the fastest growing in the state, due mainly in agriculture and furniture sector, as the city is the second-largest center of these activities in the country.

Spies attracted new businesses and companies in other industries for their economy, several companies took interest in the city, an example is the Havan, the store is located in BR 369, s / n, received investment of R $35 million and generated 200 jobs direct in the city and region; Location was done in a cinema with a 3D room and two rooms in digital format Stadium by the company Cine Gracher. The city received two fast-food franchise Subway network; Havan one inside the store and another in the center. Madero Container settled attached Arapongas the Havan and all invested R $1.5 million in the unit that serves 5,000 people per month.

Arapongas had a strong economy in 2007, growing by 10.3%, while Brazil has grown at an average of 5%. This colossal development comes mainly from agriculture and its polo furniture which is the second-largest in Brazil. The forecast is that Arapongas reaches the level that today is its neighbor city Apucarana in 2015 and Londrina in 2028. Its rapid growth makes it one of the fastest-growing cities in the state.

== Notable people ==
- Luciano Pagliarini – Brazilian cyclist
- Ademar Aparecido Xavier Júnior – Brazilian footballer
- Wilson Aparecido Xavier Júnior – Brazilian footballer
