= Francisco Beltrão Airport =

Paulo Abdala Airport Aeroporto Paulo Abdala
- IATA: FBE; ICAO: SSFB; LID: PR0021

Summary
- Airport type: Public
- Operator: Francisco Beltrão; SEIL
- Serves: Francisco Beltrão
- Opened: November 9, 2010
- Time zone: BRT (UTC−03:00)
- Elevation AMSL: 644 m (2,113 ft)
- Coordinates: 26°03′32″S 053°03′48″W

Map
- Location in Brazil FBE (Brazil)

Runways
Direction	Length		Surface
Direction	m	ft	Surface
07/25	1,390	4,560	Asphalt

Statistics (2011)
- Passengers: 1,516 ▲279%
- Aircraft Operations: 730 ▲92%
- Statistics: SEIL; Sources: ANAC, DECEA

Paulo Abdala Airport (IATA: FBE, ICAO: SSFB) is the airport serving Francisco Beltrão, Brazil.

It is operated by the Municipality of Francisco Beltrão under the supervision of Aeroportos do Paraná (SEIL).

== History ==
The new passenger terminal was commissioned on November 9, 2010.

== Access ==
The airport is located 2 km (1 mi) from downtown Francisco Beltrão.

== See also ==
- List of airports in Brazil
