= Campo Mourão Airport =

Coronel Geraldo Guias de Aquino Airport Aeroporto Coronel Guias de Aquino
- IATA: CBW; ICAO: SSKM; LID: PR0017

Summary
- Airport type: Public
- Operator: Campo Mourão; SEIL
- Serves: Campo Mourão
- Time zone: BRT (UTC−03:00)
- Elevation AMSL: 574 m (1,883 ft)
- Coordinates: 24°00′09″S 052°21′25″W

Map
- Location in Brazil CBW (Brazil)

Runways
Direction	Length		Surface
Direction	m	ft	Surface
02/20	1,370	4,495	Asphalt

Statistics (2011)
- Passengers: 1,314 ▲55%
- Aircraft Operations: 2,457 ▲298%
- Statistics: SEIL; Sources: ANAC, DECEA

Coronel Geraldo Guias de Aquino Airport (IATA: CBW, ICAO: SSKM) is the airport serving Campo Mourão, Brazil.

It is operated by the Municipality of Acampo Mourão under the supervision of Aeroportos do Paraná (SEIL).

== Access ==
The airport is located 5 km (3 mi) from downtown Campo Mourão.

== See also ==
- List of airports in Brazil
