= Guarapuava Airport =

Tancredo Thomas de Faria Airport Aeroporto Tancredo Thomas de Faria
- IATA: GPB; ICAO: SSGG; LID: PR0009

Summary
- Airport type: Public
- Operator: Guarapuava; SEIL
- Serves: Guarapuava
- Time zone: BRT (UTC−03:00)
- Elevation AMSL: 1,065 m / 3,494 ft
- Coordinates: 25°23′17″S 051°31′18″W

Map
- Location in Brazil GPB (Brazil)

Runways
Direction	Length		Surface
Direction	m	ft	Surface
08/26	1,365	4,478	Asphalt

Statistics (2011)
- Passengers: 916 ▼24%
- Aircraft Operations: 2,805 ▼3%
- Statistics: SEIL; Sources: ANAC, DECEA

Tancredo Thomas de Faria Airport (IATA: GPB, ICAO: SSGG) formerly SBGU, is the airport that serves Guarapuava, Brazil.

It is operated by the Municipality of Guarapuava under the supervision of Aeroportos do Paraná (SEIL).

== Airlines and destinations ==
No scheduled flights operate at this airport.

== Access ==
The airport is located 6 km (4 mi) west from downtown Guarapuava.

== See also ==
- List of airports in Brazil
