= Pato Branco Airport =

Prof. Juvenal Loureiro Cardoso Airport Aeroporto Prof. Juvenal Loureiro Cardoso
- IATA: PTO; ICAO: SBPO; LID: PR0018

Summary
- Airport type: Public
- Operator: Pato Branco; SEIL
- Serves: Pato Branco
- Time zone: BRT (UTC−03:00)
- Elevation AMSL: 823 m (2,700 ft)
- Coordinates: 26°13′02″S 052°41′40″W

Map
- Location in Brazil PTO (Brazil)

Runways
| Direction | Length | | Surface |
| Direction | m | ft | Surface |
|---|---|---|---|
| 07/25 | 1,621 | 5,318 | Asphalt |

Statistics (2011)
- Passengers: 3,087 ▲3%
- Aircraft Operations: 2,414 ▲5%
- Statistics: SEIL; Sources: ANAC, DECEA

Prof. Juvenal Loureiro Cardoso Regional Airport (IATA: PTO, ICAO: SBPO) formerly SSPB, is the airport serving Pato Branco, Brazil.

It is operated by the Municipality of Pato Branco under the supervision of Aeroportos do Paraná (SEIL).

== Airlines and destinations ==
| Airlines | Destinations |
|---|---|
| Azul Brazilian Airlines | Campinas, Curitiba |

== Access ==
The airport is located 4 km (2 mi) from downtown Pato Branco.

== See also ==
- List of airports in Brazil
