= Guaíra Airport =

Airport in Brazil

Walter Martins de Oliveira Municipal Airport Aeroporto Municipal Walter Martins de Oliveira
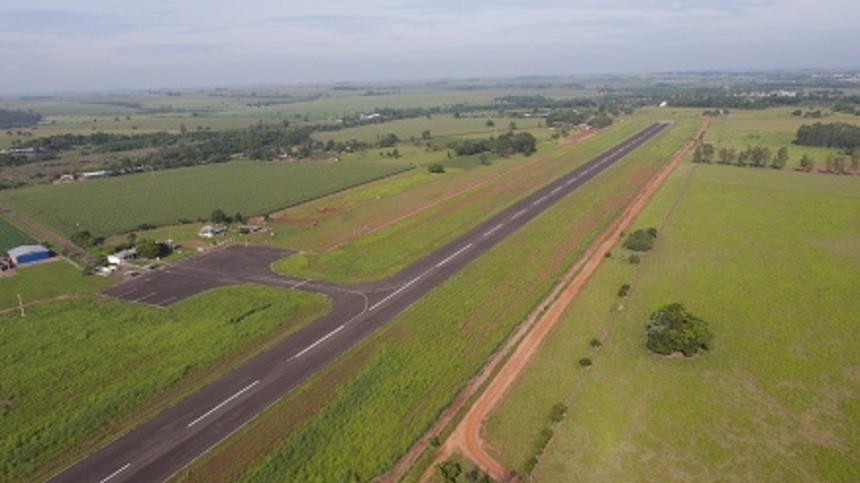
- IATA: GGJ; ICAO: SSGY; LID: PR0023

Summary
- Airport type: Public
- Operator: Guaíra; SEIL
- Serves: Guaíra
- Opened: 14 November 1977; 48 years ago
- Time zone: BRT (UTC−03:00)
- Elevation AMSL: 271 m (889 ft)
- Coordinates: 24°04′47″S 054°11′17″W

Map
- Location in Brazil GGJ (Brazil)

Runways
Direction	Length		Surface
Direction	m	ft	Surface
08/26	1,300	4,265	Asphalt

Statistics (2009)
- Passengers: 274 ▲10%
- Aircraft Operations: 324 ▲1%
- Metric tonnes of cargo: 0
- Statistics: SEIL; Sources: ANAC, DECEA

Walter Martins de Oliveira Municipal Airport (IATA: GGJ, ICAO: SSGY) is the airport serving Guaíra, Brazil. It is named after Walter Martins de Oliveira (1920–1983), a local entrepreneur and aviation pioneer in the region of Guaíra.

It is operated by the Municipality of Guaíra under the supervision of Aeroportos do Paraná (SEIL).

== History ==
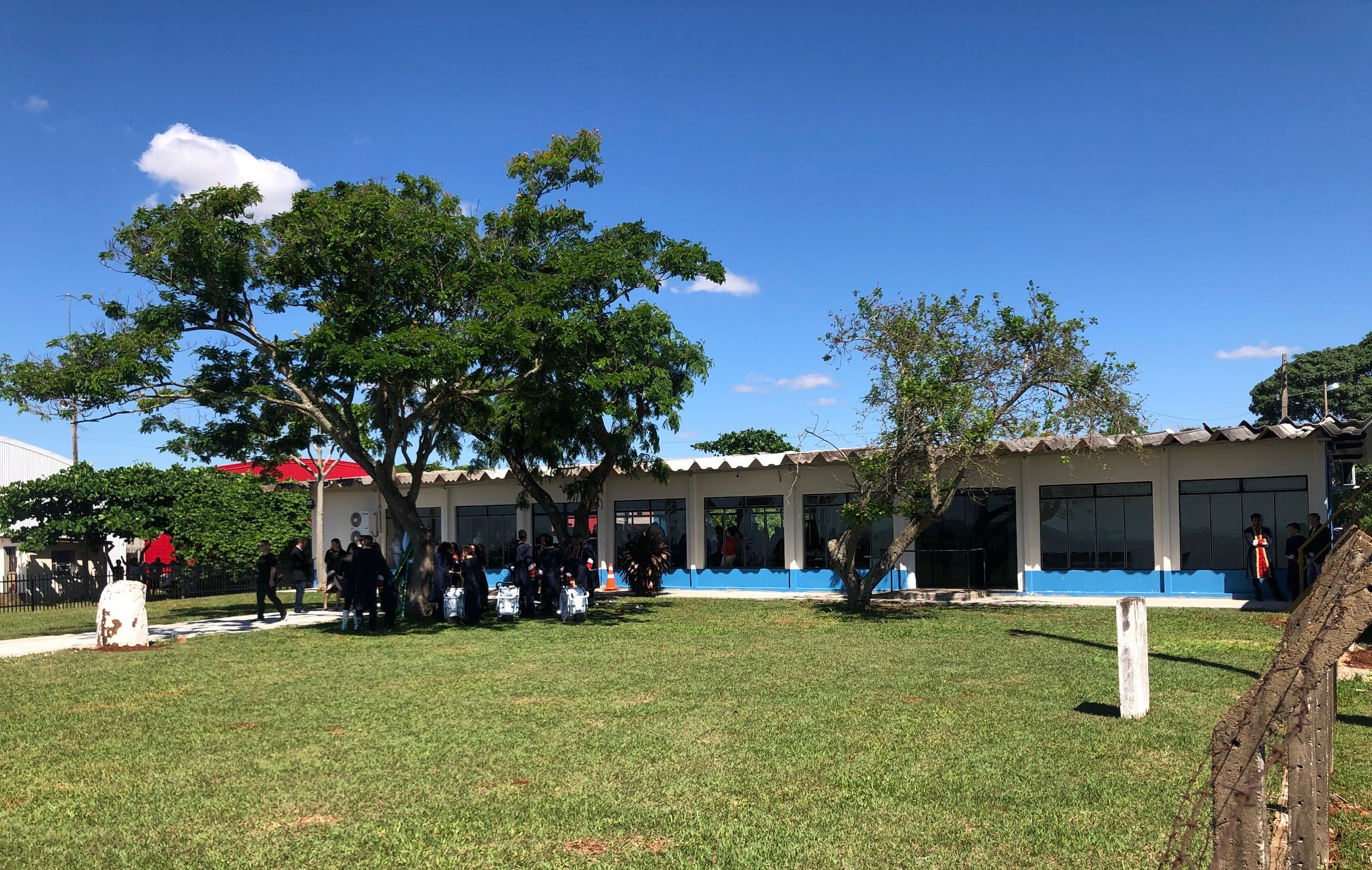
Terminal building as seen from the apron

The airport was commissioned on November 14, 1977, replacing a former facility located closer to the city.

The airport was closed for renovation between 2010 and 2014.

== Airlines and destinations ==
Airlines	Destinations
Azul Conecta	Curitiba

== Access ==
The airport is located 10 km (6 mi) east from downtown Guaíra.

== See also ==
- List of airports in Brazil
