= Cornélio Procópio =

Coordinates: 23°08′S 50°39′W

The Municipality of Cornélio Procópio Procopense
- City
- Flag Coat of arms
- Nickname: Capital do Norte Pioneiro; North Pioneer Capital
- Interactive map of The Municipality of Cornélio Procópio
- Country: Brazil
- Region: Southern
- State: Paraná
- Mesoregion: Norte Pioneiro Paranaense
- Created: February 15, 1938

Government
  - Mayor: Rafael Sampaio(2025 – )

Area
  - Total: 245,200 sq mi (635,100 km^{2})

Population (2020)
  - Total: 47,842
- Demonym: Procopense
- Time zone: UTC −3
- Postal Code (CEP): 86300-000
- Area code: 43
- Website: cornelioprocopio.pr.gov.br/portal/index.php

Cornélio Procópio is a municipality in the state of Paraná in the Southern Region of Brazil.

The city is served by Francisco Lacerda Junior Airport.

== History ==
It was thus named in honor of Colonel Cornélio Procópio de Araújo Carvalho, a prominent figure in the Brazilian Empire during the late 19th century. The colonel was the patron of the railway station at km 125, which is the landmark of the entire economic expansion of the region in which the city is located.

Colonel Procópio, who died in 1909, left nine children, including Maria Balbina Procópio Junqueira, married to his second cousin, Francisco da Cunha Junqueira, owner of Gleba Laranjinha, who named the town of Santa Mariana, which until then was just a farm. With the same sentiment, she gave her father-in-law's name to the urban agglomeration located at km 125, along with the expansion of the railroad.

Francisco Junqueira was a politician from São Paulo and as such he became involved in the Constitutionalist Revolution of 1932, alongside his State. As they were defeated, Francisco Junqueira ended up being deported to Portugal by the government of Getúlio Vargas. In financial difficulties, he sold his lands in Paraná to the allotment company formed by Colonel Francisco Moreira da Costa and Antônio de Paiva. Before that, however, Junqueira planned the subdivision of properties and the establishment of two urban centers, called Santa Mariana, in honor of his wife, Mariana, and Cornélio Procópio, in honor of his father-in-law.

In the interval between the sale of the land by Junqueira and ownership by the company Paiva & Moreira, some streets began to be occupied without obeying any planning, that is, some rustic buildings were erected, fleeing the previously established urban pattern. The new owners reorganized the urban occupation and with the movement of the railroad, the city began to grow and develop. It is worth remembering that the first urban lots were sold around Praça Brasil, and there, at the intersection of Rua Quintino Bocaiúva and Av. XV de Novembro, is the starting point of the city.

The railroad is closely linked with the colonization, emergence and development of the city. With it arrived immigrants, in addition to pioneers from São Paulo and Minas Gerais in the majority, but the trails were also opened by many others.

The Companhia Ferroviária Noroeste do Paraná was created in 1920 by a group of farmers eradicated in the region of Jacarezinho and Cambará. The construction of this railroad began in 1923, and in 1924 the name was changed to Companhia Ferroviária São Paulo-Paraná, when on June 12, the first stretch between Ourinhos and Leoflora was inaugurated. The city of Cornélio Procópio emerged and developed on the banks of km 125 of the railroad, and the station of Cornélio Procópio was founded in 1930.

The Companhia Ferroviária São Paulo-Paraná had the objective of providing the outflow of the crop from the centers that emerged in the north of Paraná, but after 1925 when the railroad reached Cambará, financial difficulties did not allow the railroad to advance further. It was only with the arrival of English capital through Paraná Plantations in 1928 that the works were able to advance.

The railroad would not be limited only to the North of Paraná, since it would cross the entire State diagonally to Guaíra, on the banks of the Paraná River. Its beginning is in the city of Ourinhos (SP). According to the original projects and ideas, from Guaíra the railroad would extend to Asunción, capital of Paraguay. It was a grand and expensive project. Overcoming the sertão was not the main difficulty, but convincing investors and raising capital was.

For the construction of the railroad, there was a need for authorization or concession from the Federal Government, a factor that was not a problem, since it was influenced by São Paulo and Minas Gerais, within what was conventionally called "coffee with milk policy".

Who obtained the concession was the economic group led by Antônio Barbosa Ferraz, who built the first section of the railroad linking Ourinhos to Cambará, up to an important farm of the group. Due to lack of capital, construction was parked in that location for a long time.

The solution for the construction would come through the sale of railroad shares to English businessmen, attracted by the fertility and availability of land in northern Paraná. By the way, the possibility of good profits was the best argument.

On the morning of December 1, 1930, the Maria Smoke inaugurated the journey between Cornélio Procópio, Santa Mariana, Bandeirantes and Cambará. In March 1931, the city received a visit from the Prince of Wales (future King Edward VIII). A grand reception was held to honor him.

An employee of the Companhia de Terras Norte do Paraná, Gordon Fox Rule, explained the reasons for the prince's visit: "An interesting episode that occurred during the English phase in the company was the visit made to us by the Prince of Wales, who would later come to be King Edward VIII of England. It is said that he was a major shareholder in the company Paraná Plantation

== Religion ==
The city is the seat of the Roman Catholic Diocese of Cornélio Procópio.

== See also ==
- List of municipalities in Paraná
