= Arapoti =

City in Brazil

Coordinates: 24°10′S 49°40′W

- Municipality
- Flag Coat of arms
- Interactive map of Arapoti
- Country: Brazil
- Time zone: UTC−3 (BRT)

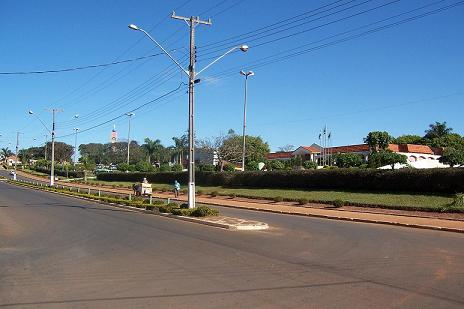

Arapoti is a municipality in the state of Paraná in Brazil served by Avelino Vieira Airport. As of 2020, the estimated population was 28,300.

== See also ==
- List of municipalities in Paraná
- Saint Nicholas Garden Canyon
