= Cianorte =

Coordinates: 23°37′S 52°37′W

City of Cianorte
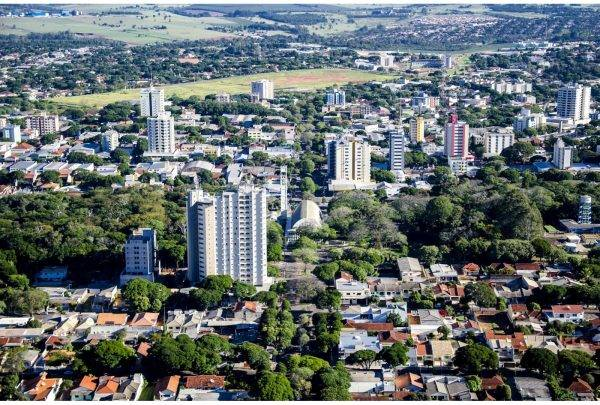

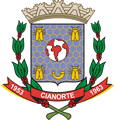
- Flag Coat of arms
- Nickname: Capital of the National Clothing
- Interactive map of City of Cianorte
- Country: Brazil
- Region: South
- State: Paraná
- Founded: July 26, 1955

Area
  - City: 811.7 km^{2} (313.4 sq mi)
- Elevation: 490 m (1,610 ft)

Population (2020)
  - City: 83,816
  - Density: 79.4/km^{2} (206/sq mi)
  - Metro: 134,426
- Time zone: UTC-3
- HDI (2000): 0.818 – high
- Website: Cianorte, Paraná

Cianorte is a municipality in the state of Paraná in Brazil, with an estimated population of 83,816, according to the Brazilian Institute of Geography and Statistics in 2020.

== History ==
The city was planned as a "garden city" and founded by the Company for the Improvement of the North of Paraná (Companhia Melhoramentos Norte do Paraná), a British company for which it was named. In the beginning of the 20th century the region was dominated by a subtropical forest and totally wild, except for the Road of Peabiru, used by the Portuguese to connect the Guaira region, further west, to the coast. The road existed from the 17th century, but the first reported contact with the natives of the region, the Xetas, was in the 1930s. The Xetas, a group of three or four hundred, had their own language, and were early Iron Age in culture. The group vanished after they were contacted by the British in controversial and unexplained circumstances.

In the 1940s the English company drew the city plan and split the region into very small farms. At this time, the city was redivided and part of the city and the areas around were sold to immigrants, mainly Italian-Brazilians and Japanese-Brazilians of second or third generation from São Paulo. Those immigrants were primarily poor ordinary workers in the huge coffee farms of São Paulo, and perceived the inexpensive land in Cianorte as their big opportunity in life. They built houses and schools, temples and businesses. The city become a municipality, which, under Brazilian laws, allows the area to extend its political structure.

The Municipality of Cianorte was created through the State Law no. 2.412 of July 26, 1955. Cianorte then had around 11,000 inhabitants, mostly in the countryside. The economy was based on coffee. A disastrous frost in the winter of 1975, in which temperatures dropped below zero for the first time in recorded weather, destroyed the coffee plantations. Coffee trees take around five years to start producing, and so the economy went through a terrible crisis. Population fell and businesses closed.

The disaster transformed the city. People opened clothing factories and shops in their garages and back yards. By the time agriculture began to recover, some of the mini-factories had grown to medium-sized companies, and the work force was already devoted to those. During the next decades some of those garage enterprises turned into huge factories that today sell clothes to the entire country, and export a significant portion to several countries. Shop owners from several states of Brazil visit Cianorte in the beginning of every season to purchase clothing, so hotels and restaurants are opened specially for them.

Local agriculture is now significantly diversified — coffee is only 5% of the farmland now — and other farmers plant soy, sugar cane and corn. Beef and chicken are also produced in a fairly large scale. With the factories and the agriculture doing so well, in the turn of the century the city attracted more and more immigrants from all over the country, and today the city population, business and infrastructure is growing quickly, turning Cianorte into the regional hub of part of Ivai River Valley, which includes ten smaller cities.

== Climate ==
Humid Subtropical climate, hot summers with frequent and heavy rain (average temperatures ranging from 20 °C to 27 °C), mild winters with frequent frosts (average temperatures ranging from 14 °C to 23 °C).

Climate data for Cianorte, elevation 530 m (1,740 ft), (1976–2005 normals, extremes 1972–2001)
Month	Jan	Feb	Mar	Apr	May	Jun	Jul	Aug	Sep	Oct	Nov	Dec	Year
Record high °C (°F)	35.9 (96.6)	36.4 (97.5)	35.4 (95.7)	33.6 (92.5)	32.2 (90.0)	30.4 (86.7)	31.4 (88.5)	35.5 (95.9)	37.4 (99.3)	35.6 (96.1)	39.0 (102.2)	38.0 (100.4)	39.0 (102.2)
Mean daily maximum °C (°F)	30.3 (86.5)	30.1 (86.2)	30.1 (86.2)	28.1 (82.6)	24.6 (76.3)	23.0 (73.4)	23.7 (74.7)	25.6 (78.1)	26.2 (79.2)	28.3 (82.9)	29.5 (85.1)	29.8 (85.6)	27.4 (81.4)
Daily mean °C (°F)	24.7 (76.5)	24.5 (76.1)	24.2 (75.6)	22.1 (71.8)	19.0 (66.2)	17.3 (63.1)	17.5 (63.5)	19.3 (66.7)	20.3 (68.5)	22.3 (72.1)	23.7 (74.7)	24.3 (75.7)	21.6 (70.9)
Mean daily minimum °C (°F)	20.6 (69.1)	20.6 (69.1)	20.0 (68.0)	17.8 (64.0)	15.0 (59.0)	13.4 (56.1)	13.2 (55.8)	14.6 (58.3)	15.7 (60.3)	17.5 (63.5)	18.8 (65.8)	20.0 (68.0)	17.3 (63.1)
Record low °C (°F)	11.3 (52.3)	13.0 (55.4)	8.8 (47.8)	4.3 (39.7)	2.2 (36.0)	0.0 (32.0)	−2.4 (27.7)	1.0 (33.8)	3.2 (37.8)	7.9 (46.2)	9.4 (48.9)	11.9 (53.4)	−2.4 (27.7)
Average precipitation mm (inches)	216.3 (8.52)	172.2 (6.78)	141.5 (5.57)	133.4 (5.25)	138.0 (5.43)	123.1 (4.85)	67.5 (2.66)	76.4 (3.01)	136.4 (5.37)	158.9 (6.26)	135.8 (5.35)	191.3 (7.53)	1,690.8 (66.58)
Average precipitation days (≥ 1.0 mm)	14	14	11	8	8	8	5	7	10	11	10	14	120
Average relative humidity (%)	75	76	72	70	73	74	67	62	65	66	65	72	70
Mean monthly sunshine hours	219.9	191.1	228.5	224.1	207.6	197.9	226.3	219.5	188.5	222.1	232.9	222.4	2,580.8
Source 1: Empresa Brasileira de Pesquisa Agropecuária (EMBRAPA)
Source 2: IDR-Paraná (precipitation days and sun 1972–2001)

== Economy ==
Main economical activities are:

- Agriculture - Soy, corn, coffee, wheat, sugarcane, cotton, beef and chicken
- Manufacturing - Clothing, footwear and leather

Cianorte is served by Gastão Mesquita Airport.

The municipality contains part of the 8,716 hectares (21,540 acres) Perobas Biological Reserve, a strictly protected conservation unit created in 2006.

== Clothes ==
Cianorte is the largest producer of clothing in southern Brazil. There are 300 clothing manufacturers in the industrial and commercial districts, which employ 8,000 people. The production focuses on informal clothing such as jeans and athletic wear, men's and women's fashion, infants' and toddlers' clothing.

Throughout the year consumers and distributors come to Cianorte seeking clothing products. The city hosts Expovest, an annual and the largest clothing fair in southern Brazil, in the city's central park. During the fair the city welcomes 5.500 visitors a month.

== Education ==
Has elementary schools, high schools, and two Universities.

== Culture ==
The cultural expressions of Cianorte are very diverse, including plays, movies, painting, plastic arts, music, etc. An old train station was transformed into the Casa da Cultura, with painting exhibitions, plastic arts, old pictures of the city, musical presentations, etc.

== Tourist attractions ==
- Cachoeira do Rio Ligeiro - A 2-meter-tall (6.6 ft) waterfall of clean water, at the end of the municipal district, attracting local residents seeking bathing and contact with nature.
- Cinturão Verde - Green area surrounding most of city, has a modern track.
- Bosque da Matriz - The mother church is surrounded by a green area, with bathrooms, parks, animals and a public library.
- Parque do Manduí - public park located in the neighborhoods of the Labor Villa and Villa 7.
- Expovest - Every year the city hosts Expovest, the largest clothing fair in the South of the country, in the city's exhibition park. In that period the city receives about 5,500 tourists a month.
