= Manoel Ribas =

- Municipality
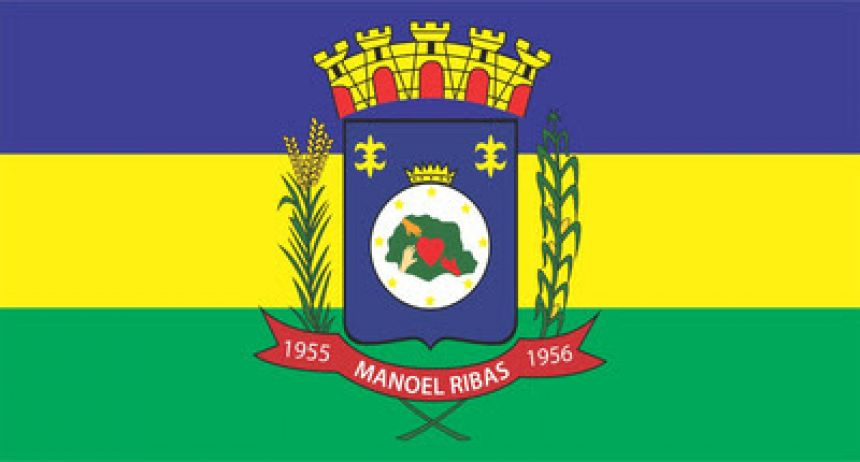
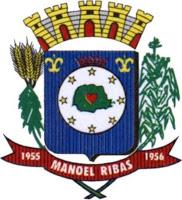
- Flag Coat of arms

- Location in Brazil
- Coordinates: 24°30′57″S 51°40′4″W
- Country: Brazil
- Region: Southern
- State: Paraná
- Mesoregion: Norte Central Paranaense

Population (2020)
  - Total: 13,510
- Time zone: UTC−3 (BRT)

Manoel Ribas is a municipality in the state of Paraná in the Southern Region of Brazil.

== See also ==
- List of municipalities in Paraná
