= Guaíra, Paraná =

Guaíra
- Municipality
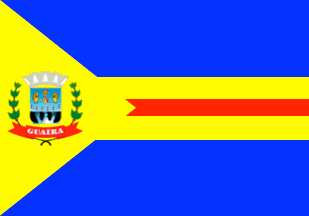
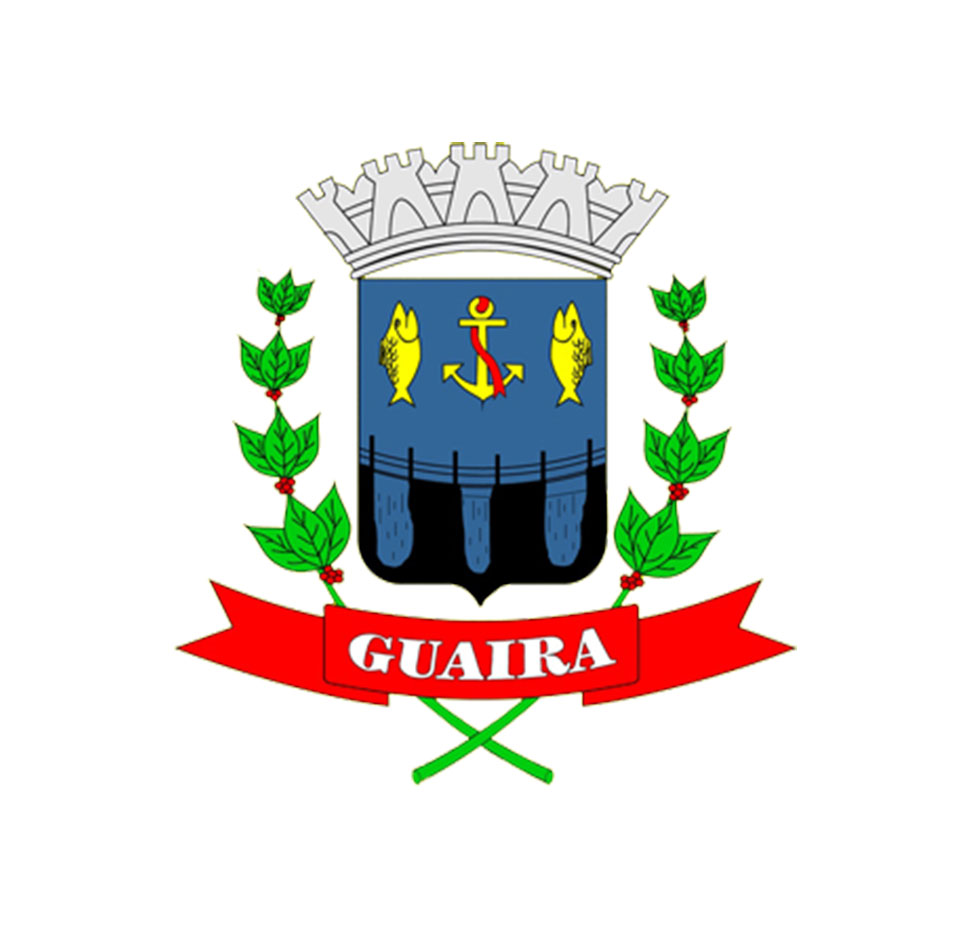
- Flag Coat of arms

- Location in Paraná state

- Location in Brazil
- Coordinates: 24°4′48″S 54°15′21″W
- Country: Brazil
- Region: South
- State: Paraná
- Mesoregion: Oeste Paranaense

Area
  - Total: 560 km^{2} (220 sq mi)

Population (2020)
  - Total: 33,310
  - Density: 59/km^{2} (150/sq mi)
- Time zone: UTC−3 (BRT)

Guaíra (Brazilian Portuguese pronunciation: [ɡwaˈiɾɐ]) is a municipality in the state of Paraná in the Southern Region of Brazil. The population is 33,310 (2020 est.) in an area of 560 km^{2}. The elevation is 517 m. This place name comes from the Tupi language and means "place difficult to access". It borders the Paraguayan city of Salto del Guairá, across the Paraná River, which marks the border between Brazil and Paraguay. Just like its Paraguayan twin city, it is named after the Guaíra Falls, which was located on the border with Paraguay. The falls was submerged after the construction of the Itaipu Dam in 1982.

== History ==
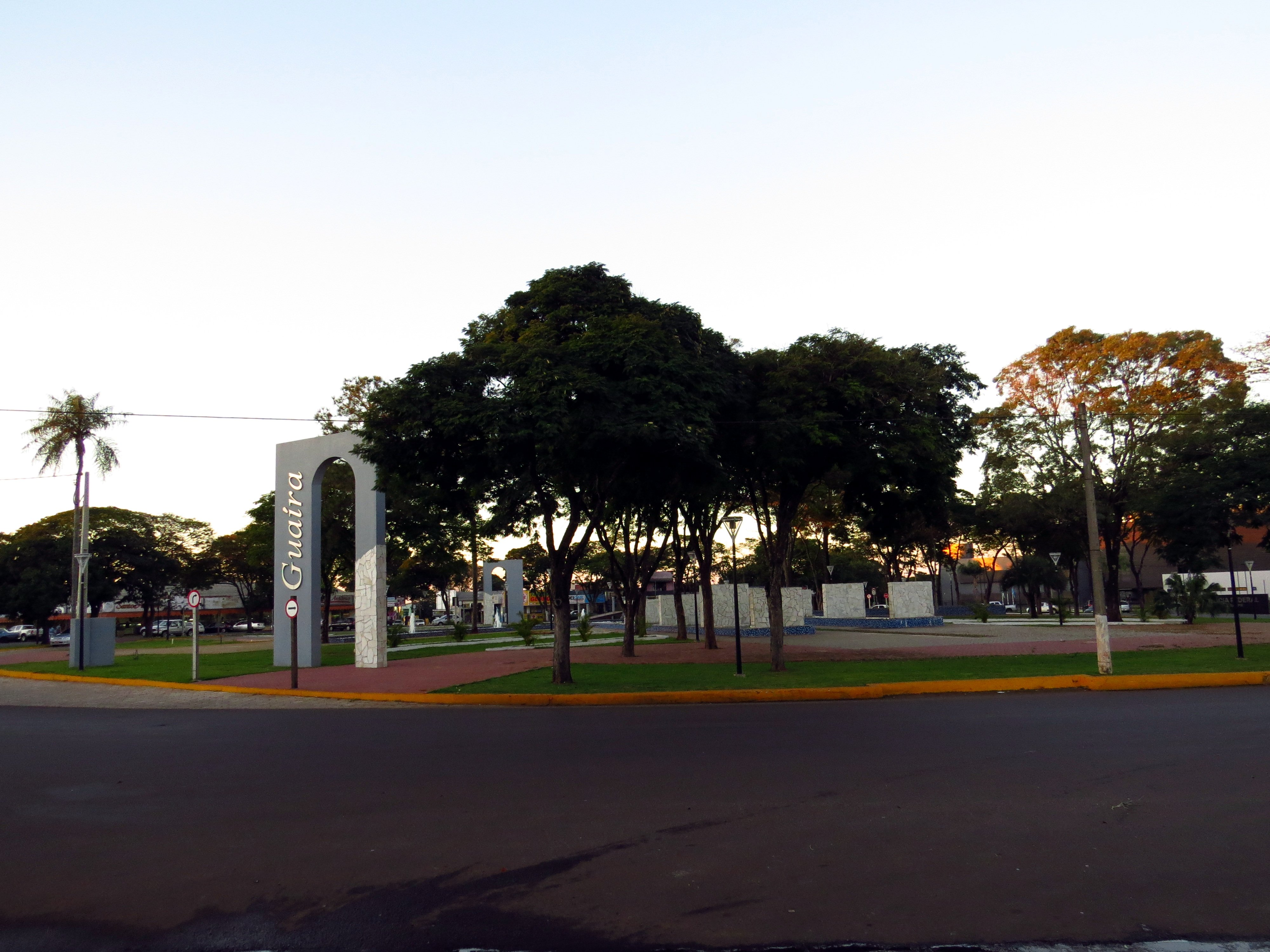
Castelo Branco Square

The foundation of Guaíra is closely linked to Companhia Matte Larangeira, also responsible for the founding of the city of Porto Murtinho. In historical times, it belonged to the indigenous people; in 1556 it was occupied by the Spanish. At that time, the Jesuit Missions took place, which aimed to catechize the Indians, based on the precepts of the Catholic Church. The Missions took place in the territories now geographically demarcated in the States of Rio Grande do Sul, Paraná and Paraguay. In 1620, the territory of Guaíra was virtually in the hands of the Portuguese, as the São Paulo bandeirantes periodically ravaged the region, destroying the Spanish people and enslaving the catechized Indians of the Jesuit reductions.

It was only in 1872, with the Limits Treaty, that the territorial limits between Brazil and Paraguay were demarcated, leaving Guaíra in Brazilian territory. The search for wealth, or for slave labor, led the Bandeirantes Paulistas to enter this territory, decimating the Spanish groups and enslaving the Indians. These lands remained without economic and population development for a period.

After complaints from the Superintendent, Antonio Corrêa da Costa and losses caused by the transport of Matte Larangeira's production, Banco Rio Branco declared bankruptcy in 1902 and Thomaz Larangeira acquired his estate, while Cia Matte Larangeira was sold to the Argentine company Francisco Mendes & Cia, changing its name to Larangeira Mendes e Companhia. A new lease contract was signed with the state government, along the same lines as the previous one, which would remain in force until 1916. In 1910, the main focus of exploration of erva mate was transferred to the Paraná River, reducing its strategic importance for the company, with its monopoly being broken in 1916.

The Company's headquarters were transferred in 1918 from Porto Murtinho to Campanário Farm, near the municipality of Caarapó. The herb began to be exported via the Paraná River, with only the production from nearby ranches being exported via Porto Murtinho. Since 1902, the Company had been established in Guaíra, initially called Porto Monjoli, beginning the construction of a railroad from the Guaíra to Porto Mendes Railway in 1911, which would cross the Sete Quedas rapids.

In territorial divisions dated July 31, 1936 and July 31, 1937, the district of Guaíra appears in the municipality of Foz de Iguassú. By state decree-law No. 7573, of October 20, 1938, the district of Guaíra was extinct, with its territory being annexed to the district headquarters of the municipality of Foz do Iguassú.

The dominance of Companhia Matte Larangeira continued until 1943, when Getúlio Vargas assumed power, creating the Federal Territory of Ponta Porã and the Federal Territory of Iguaçu, and annulling the concession. On April 17, 1944, Decree No. 6,428 was signed, by Getúlio Vargas incorporating the Plata Basin Navigation Service (SNBP), the District of Guaíra, the Guaíra to Porto Mendes Railway, as well as material and fixed installations, port facilities and all floating installations and material.

Guaíra was elevated to the category of municipality with this name by state law no. 790, of November 14, 1951, separated from Foz do Iguassú, being installed on December 14, 1952.

== Transportation ==
The city is served by Walter Martins de Oliveira Airport.

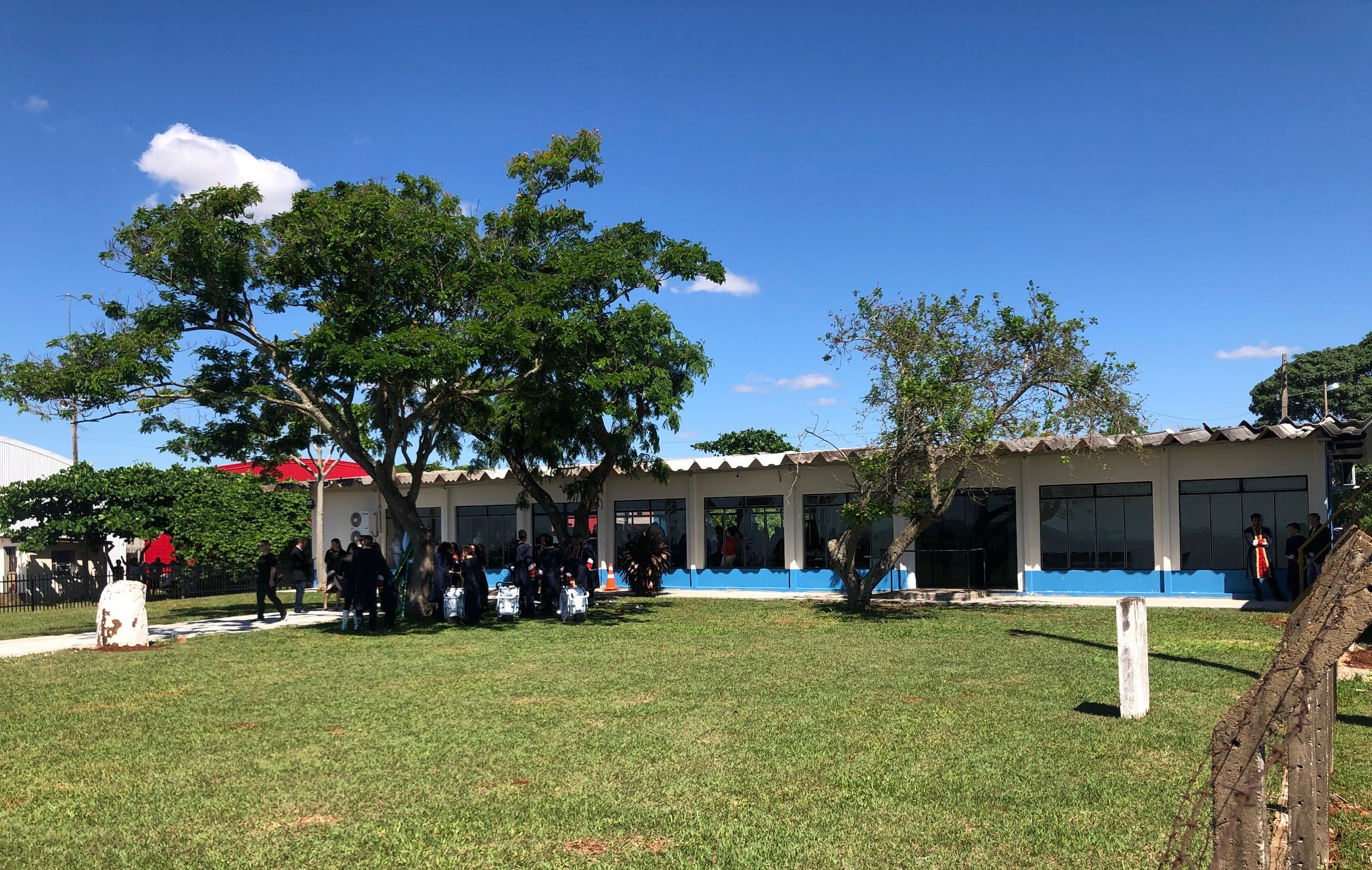
Terminal building as seen from the apron in 2019

== Consular representation ==
Paraguay has a Consulate in Guaíra.

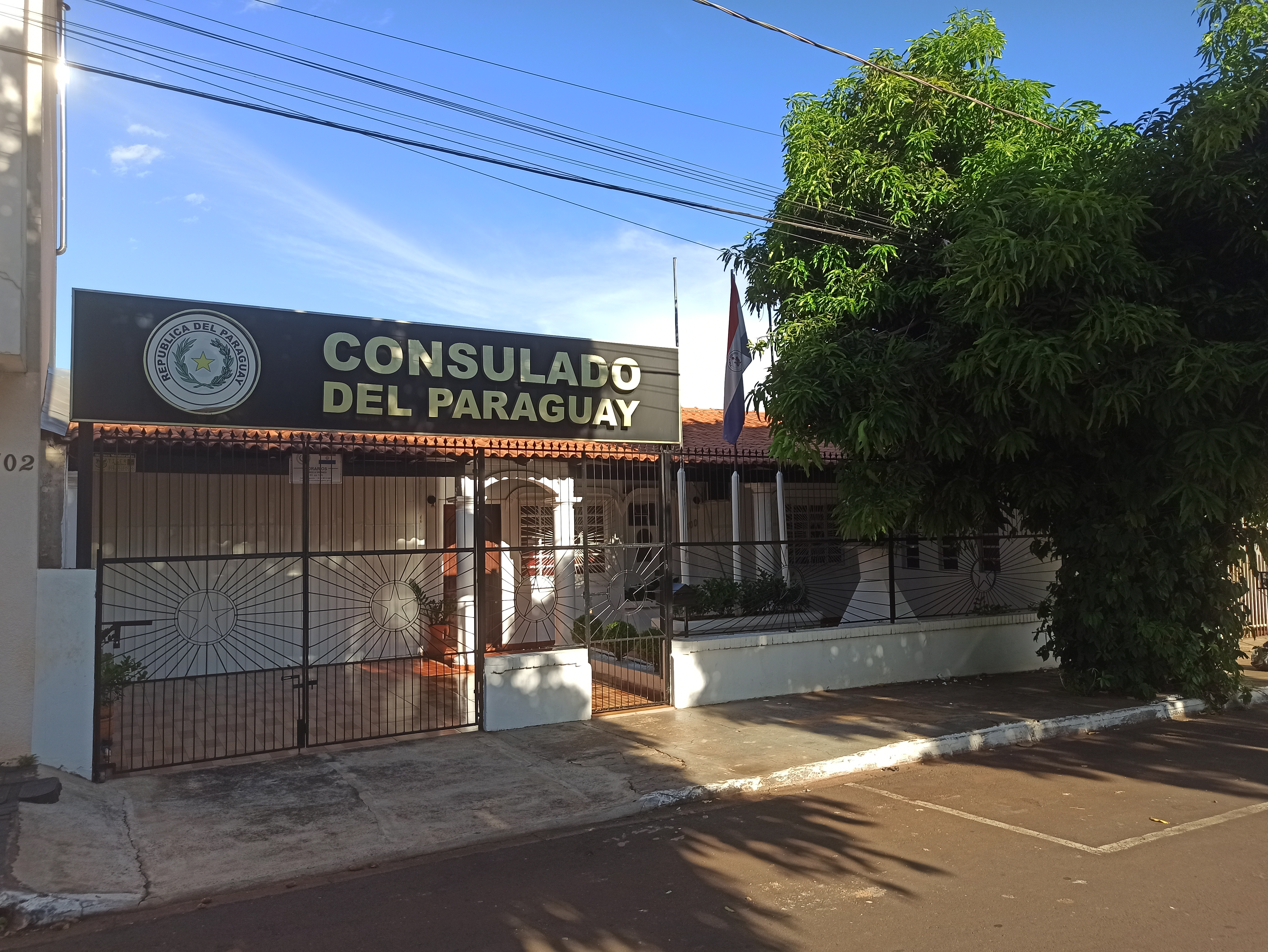
Consulate of Paraguay

== Climate ==
Climate data for Guaíra, Paraná (1981–2010)
Month	Jan	Feb	Mar	Apr	May	Jun	Jul	Aug	Sep	Oct	Nov	Dec	Year
Mean daily maximum °C (°F)	32.5 (90.5)	31.9 (89.4)	31.3 (88.3)	28.8 (83.8)	25.1 (77.2)	23.4 (74.1)	23.9 (75.0)	25.9 (78.6)	26.9 (80.4)	29.2 (84.6)	31.2 (88.2)	32.0 (89.6)	28.5 (83.3)
Daily mean °C (°F)	26.4 (79.5)	25.9 (78.6)	25.0 (77.0)	22.7 (72.9)	19.3 (66.7)	17.5 (63.5)	17.3 (63.1)	19.0 (66.2)	20.6 (69.1)	23.1 (73.6)	24.9 (76.8)	25.9 (78.6)	22.3 (72.1)
Mean daily minimum °C (°F)	21.9 (71.4)	21.6 (70.9)	20.5 (68.9)	18.3 (64.9)	15.0 (59.0)	13.1 (55.6)	12.4 (54.3)	13.6 (56.5)	15.5 (59.9)	18.1 (64.6)	19.7 (67.5)	21.1 (70.0)	17.6 (63.7)
Average precipitation mm (inches)	168.9 (6.65)	134.9 (5.31)	135.2 (5.32)	167.7 (6.60)	202.4 (7.97)	106.2 (4.18)	81.9 (3.22)	76.3 (3.00)	124.8 (4.91)	165.4 (6.51)	135.1 (5.32)	166.0 (6.54)	1,664.8 (65.54)
Average relative humidity (%)	76.4	77.9	78.7	80.7	83.8	82.9	77.0	72.5	71.9	73.6	71.3	73.3	76.7
Mean monthly sunshine hours	219.8	193.5	213.8	190.2	173.6	157.1	188.9	173.2	151.3	195.2	225.5	220.8	2,302.9
Source: Instituto Nacional de Meteorologia
