= Cascavel Airport =

Airport in Paraná, Brazil

Regional do Oeste-Cel. Adalberto Mendes da Silva Airport Aeroporto Regional do Oeste-Cel. Adalberto Mendes da Silva
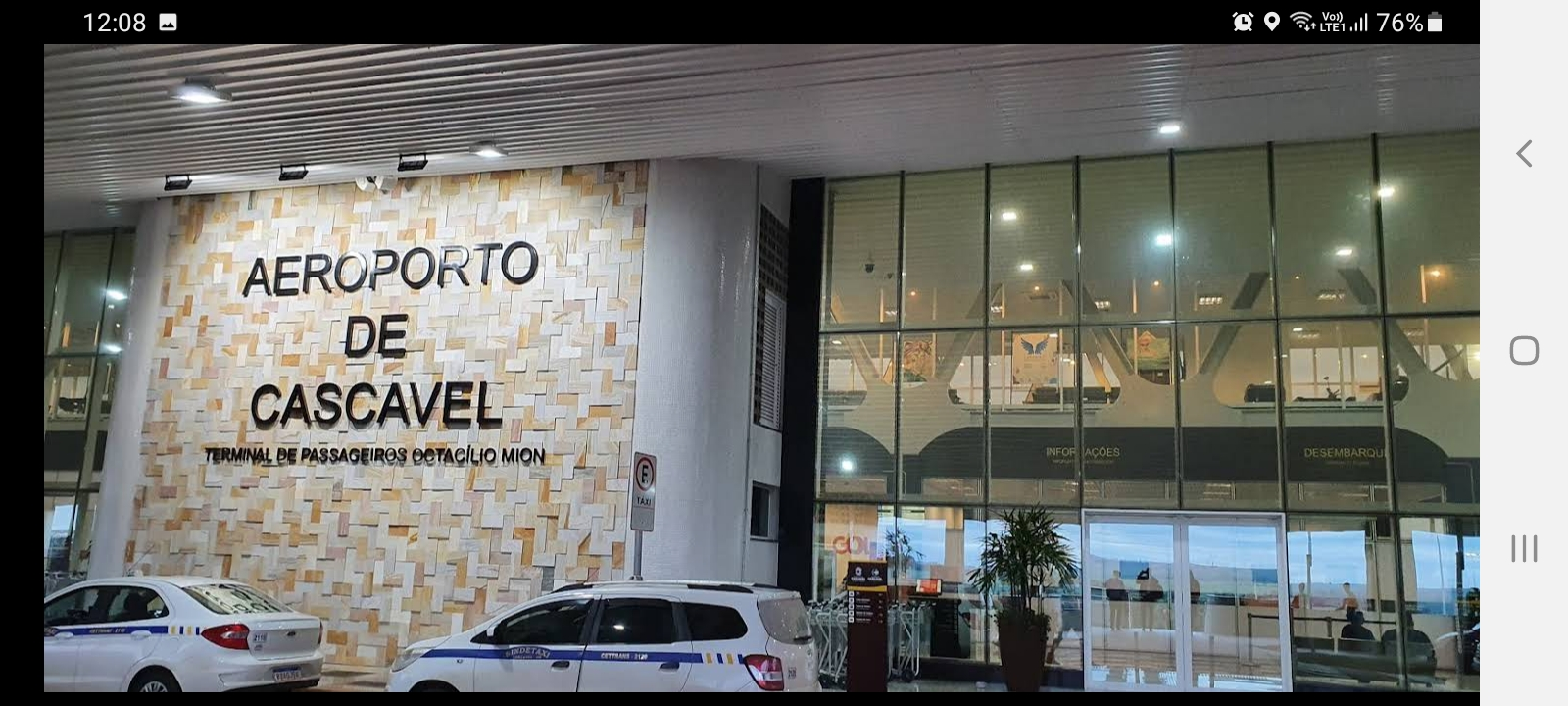
- IATA: CAC; ICAO: SBCA; LID: PR0005

Summary
- Airport type: Public
- Operator: Cascavel
- Serves: Cascavel
- Opened: November 12, 1977
- Time zone: BRT (UTC−03:00)
- Elevation AMSL: 759 m (2,490 ft)
- Coordinates: 25°00′08″S 053°30′07″W

Map
- Location in Brazil CAC (Brazil)

Runways
Direction	Length		Surface
Direction	m	ft	Surface
15/33	1,771	5,810	Asphalt

Statistics (2025)
- Passengers: 469,296 ▲15%
- Statistics: Transitar; Sources: ANAC, DECEA

Regional do Oeste-Cel. Adalberto Mendes da Silva Airport, (IATA: CAC, ICAO: SBCA), is the airport serving Cascavel, Brazil.

It is operated by Transitar, the semi-independent transportation authority of Cascavel, indirectly related to the Municipality of Cascavel.

== History ==
The airport was commissioned on November 12, 1977.

Since January 29, 2013, the airport has operated with a 1,780m × 45m runway. The expansion from its previous 1,615m × 30m size to the current dimensions was necessary due to the steady increase in the airport's traffic.

Ongoing projects at the airport are the installation of the precision approach path indicator as well as a new improved fire station, which will raise the safety category to CAT 5.

A new passenger terminal with 6.018,38 m^{2} opened in 2020.

As of the beginning of 2023, the official name of the airport was changed to Regional do Oeste-Coronel Adalberto Mendes da Silva Airport.

Cascavel Airport airside

Cascavel Airport landside

Cascavel Airport landside

== Airlines and destinations ==
Airlines	Destinations
Azul Brazilian Airlines	Campinas, Curitiba
Gol Linhas Aéreas	São Paulo–Guarulhos
LATAM Brasil	São Paulo–Guarulhos

== Access ==
The airport is located 8 km (5 mi) southwest of downtown Cascavel.

== See also ==
- List of airports in Brazil
