= List of football clubs in Brazil =

This is a list of football clubs located in Brazil. The list is sorted alphabetically by state and includes both active and inactive clubs. These football clubs are all associated with the Brazilian Football Confederation. As with many other football leagues, the structure has changed frequently, including its implementation of the same configuration of European leagues in 2003.

== List of clubs sorted by state ==
=== Acre ===
State championship: Campeonato Acreano

Club	Foundation	Location	Ref.
ADESG	26/01/1982	Senador Guiomard	
Alto Acre		Epitaciolândia	
Andirá	01/11/1964	Rio Branco	
Atlético Acreano	27/04/1952	Rio Branco	
Galvez	03/07/2011	Rio Branco	
Humaitá	15/03/2003	Porto Acre	
Independência	02/08/1946	Rio Branco	
Juventus (AC)		Rio Branco	
Náuas	19/10/1923	Cruzeiro do Sul	
Plácido de Castro	03/11/1979	Plácido de Castro	
Rio Branco (AC)	08/06/1919	Rio Branco	
Santa Cruz (AC)	01/11/2022	Rio Branco	
São Francisco (AC)	10/04/1967	Rio Branco	
Vasco da Gama (AC)	28/06/1952	Rio Branco	

=== Alagoas ===
State championship: Campeonato Alagoano

Club	Location
América (AL)	São Luís do Quitunde
ASA	Arapiraca
Bandeirante (AL)	Maceió
Bom Jesus	Matriz de Camaragibe
Capelense	Capela
CEO	Olho d'Água das Flores
Comercial (AL)	Viçosa
Corinthians Alagoano	Maceió
Coruripe	Coruripe
CRB	Maceió
CSA	Maceió
CSE	Palmeira dos Índios
Ferroviário (AL)	Maceió
Igreja Nova	Igreja Nova
Ipanema	Santana do Ipanema
Jacyobá	Pão de Açúcar
Murici	Murici
Penedense	Penedo
Santa Rita	Boca da Mata
São Domingos	Maceió
São Sebastião	Porto Calvo
Sport (AL)	Atalaia
Zumbi	União dos Palmares

==== Defunct clubs ====
Club	Location
Barroso	Maceió

=== Amapá ===
State championship: Campeonato Amapaense

Club	Foundation	Location
ADEC	29/03/2010	Calçoene
Baré (AP)	06/08/2010	Macapá
Canário	14/10/1990	Macapá
Aliança		Santana
Amapá		Macapá
Cristal	15/11/1969	Macapá
Cruzeiro (AP)	15/11/1967	Macapá
Independente (AP)	19/01/1962	Santana
Lagoa EC	24/06/1971	Macapá
Latitude Zero	19/12/1953	Macapá
Macapá	07/09/1941	Macapá
Mazagão	23/01/1979	Mazagão
Oratório	15/08/1969	Macapá
Portuguesa - AP	19/04/1994	Macapá
Renovação	24/02/1996	Macapá
Santana	25/09/1955	Santana
Santos (AP)	11/05/1973	Macapá
São José (AP)	26/08/1946	Macapá
São Paulo (AP)	03/02/1988	Macapá
Trem	01/01/1947	Macapá
Ypiranga	15/05/1963	Macapá

=== Amazonas ===
State championship: Campeonato Amazonense

Club	Location
Amazonas	Manaus
Clíper	Manaus
Fast	Manaus
Grêmio Coariense	Coari
Holanda	Rio Preto da Eva
Iranduba	Iranduba
Libermorro	Manaus
Manaus	Manaus
Manaus Compensão	Manaus
Manicoré	Manicoré
Nacional (AM)	Manaus
Olímpico	Manaus
Operário (AM)	Manacapuru
Penarol	Itacoatiara
Princesa do Solimões	Manacapuru
Rio Negro	Manaus
São Raimundo	Manaus
Sul América	Manaus
Tarumã	Manaus

==== Defunct clubs ====
Club	Location		
Manaos Athletic	Manaus		
AA Rodoviária	Manaus	América (AM)	Manaus

=== Bahia ===
State championship: Campeonato Baiano

Club	Location
Astro	Feira de Santana
Atlanta	Jequié
Atlético de Alagoinhas	Alagoinhas
Atlético Coiteense	Conceição do Coité
Avenida	Ipiaú
Bahia	Salvador
Bahia de Feira	Feira de Santana
Barreiras	Barreiras
Botafogo de Salvador	Salvador
Botafogo de Santo Amaro	Santo Amaro
Camaçariense	Camaçari
Camaçari	Camaçari
Catuense	Catu
Colo Colo	Ilhéus
Comercial (BA)	Serrinha
Cruzeiro de Cruz das Almas	Cruz das Almas
Dendê Futebol Clube	Salvador
Eunápolis	Eunápolis
Feirense	Feira de Santana
Fluminense de Feira	Feira de Santana
Galícia	Salvador
Grapiúna	Itabuna
Guanambi	Guanambi
Ilhéus	Ilhéus
Ilhota	Vera Cruz
Ipitanga	Senhor do Bonfim
Itabuna	Itabuna
Jacuipense	Riachão do Jacuípe
Jequié	Jequié
Juazeirense	Juazeiro
Juazeiro	Juazeiro
Leônico	Salvador
Madre de Deus	Madre de Deus
Monte Rey	Vera Cruz
Nazaré	Nazaré das Farinhas
Paulo Afonso	Paulo Afonso
Poções	Poções
Ratrans	São Sebastião do Passé
São José-BA	Amargosa
Senzala	Camamu
Serrano	Vitória da Conquista
Serrinha	Serrinha
UNIRB	Alagoinhas
Vitória	Salvador
Vitória da Conquista	Vitória da Conquista
Ypiranga de Valença	Valença

==== Defunct clubs ====
Club	Location
Palmeiras Nordeste	Feira de Santana
Santos Dumont	Salvador
Ypiranga	Salvador

=== Ceará ===
State championship: Campeonato Cearense

Club	Location
América (CE)	Fortaleza
Atlético Cearense	Fortaleza
Barbalha	Barbalha
Boa Viagem	Boa Viagem
Calouros do Ar	Fortaleza
Caucaia	Caucaia
Ceará	Fortaleza
Crateús	Crateús
Crato	Crato
Ferroviário (CE)	Fortaleza
Fortaleza	Fortaleza
Floresta	Fortaleza
Guarani de Juazeiro	Juazeiro do Norte
Guarany de Sobral	Sobral
Horizonte	Horizonte
Icasa	Juazeiro do Norte
Itapipoca	Itapipoca
Limoeiro	Limoeiro do Norte
Maguary	Fortaleza
Maracanã	Maracanaú
Maranguape	Maranguape
Pacajus	Pacajus
Quixadá	Quixadá
São Benedito	São Benedito
Terra e Mar	Fortaleza
Tiradentes (CE)	Fortaleza
Trairiense	Trairi

=== Distrito Federal ===
State championship: Campeonato Brasiliense

Club	Location
Bandeirante	Núcleo Bandeirante
Botafogo (DF)	Guará
Brasília	Brasília
Brasiliense	Taguatinga
Brazlândia	Brazlândia
Capital	Brasília
Ceilandense	Ceilândia
Ceilândia	Ceilândia
CFZ	Brasília
Formosa	Formosa
Gama	Gama
Guará	Guará
Legião	Brasília
Luziânia	Luziânia
Paranoá	Paranoá
Planaltina	Planaltina
Real Brasília	Núcleo Bandeirante
Sobradinho	Sobradinho
Taguatinga	Taguatinga
Unaí	Unaí

==== Defunct clubs ====
Club	Location
CEUB	Brasília
Defelê F.C.	Brasília
Tiradentes	Brasília

=== Espírito Santo ===
State championship: Campeonato Capixaba

Club	Location
Alegrense	Alegre
Aracruz	Aracruz
Desportiva Ferroviária	Cariacica
Cachoeiro	Cachoeiro de Itapemirim
Castelo	Castelo
Colatina SE	Colatina
Colatinense	Colatina
Conilon	Jaguaré
CTE Colatina	Colatina
Espírito Santo FC	Anchieta
Estrela do Norte	Cachoeiro de Itapemirim
Jaguaré	Jaguaré
Linhares FC	Linhares
Nova Venécia	Nova Venécia
Real Noroeste	Águia Branca
Rio Bananal	Rio Bananal
Rio Branco AC	Vitória
Rio Branco FC	Venda Nova do Imigrante
São Mateus	São Mateus
Serra	Serra
Tupy	Vila Velha
Vilavelhense	Vila Velha
Vitória	Vitória

==== Defunct clubs ====
Club	Location
AA Colatina	Colatina
Guarapari	Guarapari
Linhares EC	Linhares
Muniz Freire	Muniz Freire
AA Nova Venécia	Nova Venécia

=== Goiás ===
State championship: Campeonato Goiano

Club	Location
América (GO)	Morrinhos
Anapolina	Anápolis
Anápolis	Anápolis
Aparecidense	Aparecida de Goiânia
Atlético Goianiense	Goiânia
Canedense	Senador Canedo
CRAC	Catalão
Goianésia	Goianésia
Goiânia	Goiânia
Goiás	Goiânia
Goiatuba	Goiatuba
Grêmio Anápolis	Anápolis
Iporá	Iporá
Itumbiara	Itumbiara
Jataí	Jataí
Jataiense	Jataí
Mineiros	Mineiros
Morrinhos	Morrinhos
Novo Horizonte	Ipameri
Rio Verde	Rio Verde
Rioverdense	Rio Verde
Santa Helena	Santa Helena de Goiás
Trindade	Trindade
Vila Nova	Goiânia

==== Defunct clubs ====
Club	Location
Ferroviário	Goiânia
Grêmio Inhumense	Inhumas

=== Maranhão ===
State championship: Campeonato Maranhense

Club	Location
Americano (MA)	Bacabal
Bacabal	Bacabal
Boa Vontade	São Luís
Caxiense	Caxias
Chapadinha	Chapadinha
Comerciário	São Luís
Cordino	Barra do Corda
Ferroviário (MA)	São Luís
IAPE	São Luís
Imperatriz	Imperatriz
JV Lideral	Imperatriz
Juventude Samas	São Mateus do Maranhão
Maranhão	São Luís
Marília (MA)	Imperatriz
Moto Club	São Luís
Nacional (MA)	Santa Inês
Sabiá	Caxias
Sampaio Corrêa	São Luís
Santa Inês	Santa Inês
Santa Quitéria	Santa Quitéria do Maranhão
São Bento (MA)	São Bento
São José (MA)	São José de Ribamar
Tocantins (MA)	Imperatriz
Viana	Viana
Deportivo Carú FC	Carutapera

=== Mato Grosso ===
State championship: Campeonato Mato-Grossense

Club	Location
Araguaia	Alto Araguaia
Arsenal	Sorriso
Atlético (MT)	Cuiabá
Barra do Garças	Barra do Garças
Cacerense	Cáceres
CEOV	Várzea Grande
Cuiabá	Cuiabá
Dom Bosco	Cuiabá
Jaciara	Jaciara
Juventude (MT)	Primavera do Leste
Luverdense	Lucas do Rio Verde
Mixto	Cuiabá
Nova Xavantina	Nova Xavantina
Primavera	Primavera do Leste
Rondonópolis	Rondonópolis
Santa Cruz (MT)	Barra do Bugres
Sinop	Sinop
Sorriso	Sorriso
Tangará	Tangará da Serra
União	Rondonópolis
Vila Aurora	Rondonópolis

==== Defunct clubs ====
Club	Location
Berga	Cuiabá
CRAC (MT)	Campo Verde
AA Sinop	Sinop

=== Mato Grosso do Sul ===
State championship: Campeonato Sul-Mato-Grossense

Club	Location
Águia Negra	Rio Brilhante
Aquidauanense	Aquidauana
Campo Grande	Campo Grande
Cassilandense	Cassilândia
CENA	Nova Andradina
CENE	Campo Grande
Colorado (MS)	Caarapó
Comercial (MS)	Campo Grande
Costa Rica (MS)	Costa Rica
Corumbaense	Corumbá
Coxim	Coxim
Itaporã	Itaporã
Ivinhema	Ivinhema
Maracaju	Maracaju
Misto	Três Lagoas
Moreninhas	Campo Grande
Naviraiense	Naviraí
Novoperário	Campo Grande
Operário (MS)	Campo Grande
Operário de Dourados	Dourados
Pantanal	Corumbá
Pontaporanense	Ponta Porã
Ponta Porã	Ponta Porã
Rio Verde (MT)	Rio Verde de Mato Grosso
Sete de Setembro	Dourados
SERC	Chapadão do Sul
Taveirópolis	Campo Grande
URSO	Mundo Novo

==== Defunct clubs ====
Club	Location
Corinthians (MS)	Bataguassu
Nova Andradina	Nova Andradina
Paranaibense	Paranaíba
Saad	Campo Grande
Ubiratan	Dourados

=== Minas Gerais ===
State championship: Campeonato Mineiro

Club	Location
América Mineiro	Belo Horizonte
América de Teófilo Otoni	Teófilo Otoni
Araxá	Araxá
Arsenal	Santa Luzia
Athletic Club (MG)	São João del-Rei
Atlético Mineiro	Belo Horizonte
Boa Esporte	Varginha
Caldense	Poços de Caldas
CAP Uberlândia	Uberlândia
Coimbra	Itaúna
Cruzeiro	Belo Horizonte
Democrata (GV)	Governador Valadares
Democrata (SL)	Sete Lagoas
Esportivo	Passos
Fabril	Lavras
Fluminense (MG)	Araguari
Formiga	Formiga
Funorte	Montes Claros
Guarani (MG)	Divinópolis
Ipatinga	Ipatinga
Jacutinga	Jacutinga
Mamoré	Patos de Minas
Nacional de Muriaé	Muriaé
Nacional de Nova Serrana	Nova Serrana
Nacional de Uberaba	Uberaba
Olympic	Barbacena
Passense	Passos
Patrocinense	Patrocínio
Poços de Caldas	Poços de Caldas
Pouso Alegre	Pouso Alegre
Rio Branco de Andradas	Andradas
Siderúrgica	Sabará
Social	Coronel Fabriciano
Tombense	Tombos
Tricordiano	Três Corações
Tupi	Juiz de Fora
Tupynambás	Juiz de Fora
Uberaba	Uberaba
Uberlândia	Uberlândia
URT	Patos de Minas
Valeriodoce	Itabira
Villa Nova	Nova Lima

==== Defunct clubs ====
Club	Location
Flamengo (MG)	Varginha
Yale	Belo Horizonte

=== Pará ===
State championship: Campeonato Paraense

Club	Location
Abaeté	Abaetetuba
Águia de Marabá	Marabá
Ananindeua	Ananindeua
Bragantino (PA)	Bragança
Cametá	Cametá
Castanhal	Castanhal
Gavião Kyikatejê	Bom Jesus do Tocantins
Independente (PA)	Tucuruí
Izabelense	Santa Isabel do Pará
Paragominas	Paragominas
Parauapebas	Parauapebas
Paysandu	Belém
Remo	Belém
Santa Cruz (PA)	Salinópolis
Santa Rosa	Icoaraci, Belém
São Francisco	Santarém
São Raimundo (PA)	Santarém
Sport Belém	Belém
Tapajós	Santarém
Time Negra	Belém
Tuna Luso	Belém
Vila Rica	Belém

==== Defunct clubs ====
Club	Location
Tiradentes	Belém
União Esportiva	Belém

=== Paraíba ===
State championship: Campeonato Paraibano

Club	Location
América de Caaporã	Caaporã
Atlético Cajazeirense	Cajazeiras
Auto Esporte	João Pessoa
Botafogo (PB)	João Pessoa
Campinense	Campina Grande
Cruzeiro (PB)	Itaporanga
CSP	João Pessoa
Esporte	Patos
Flamengo Paraibano	João Pessoa
Desportiva Guarabira	Guarabira
Miramar	Cabedelo
Nacional de Cabedelo	Cabedelo
Nacional de Patos	Patos
Paraíba	Cajazeiras
Perilima	Campina Grande
Santa Cruz (PB)	Santa Rita
Santos (PB)	João Pessoa
Sousa	Sousa
Treze	Campina Grande

==== Defunct clubs ====
Club	Location
Confiança (PB)	Sapé

=== Paraná ===
State championship: Campeonato Paranaense

Club	Location
Adap Galo	Maringá
Arapongas	Arapongas
Athletico Paranaense	Curitiba
Azuriz	Marmeleiro
Batel	Guarapuava
Cascavel CR	Cascavel
FC Cascavel	Cascavel
Cianorte	Cianorte
Comercial (PR)	Cornélio Procópio
Coritiba	Curitiba
Engenheiro Beltrão	Engenheiro Beltrão
Foz do Iguaçu	Foz do Iguaçu
Francisco Beltrão	Francisco Beltrão
Hawaí	Campo Mourão
Iguaçu	União da Vitória
Iraty	Irati
Londrina	Londrina
Maringá	Maringá
Nacional de Rolândia	Rolândia
Operário (PR)	Ponta Grossa
Paraná	Curitiba
Paranavaí	Paranavaí
Pato Branco	Pato Branco
Pitanguense	Pitanga
Portuguesa (PR)	Londrina
Prudentópolis EC	Prudentópolis
Prudentópolis FC	Prudentópolis
PSTC	Londrina
Real Brasil	Curitiba
Rio Branco (PR)	Paranaguá
Rolândia	Rolândia
Toledo	Toledo
Umuarama	Umuarama

==== Defunct clubs ====
Club	Location
ADAP	Campo Mourão
América (PR)	Curitiba
Apucarana	Apucarana
Britânia	Curitiba
Cambaraense	Cambará
Cascavel	Cascavel
Colorado	Curitiba
Ferroviário (PR)	Curitiba
Galo Maringá	Maringá
Grêmio Maringá	Maringá
Internacional (PR)	Curitiba
J. Malucelli	Curitiba
Matsubara	Cambará
Monte Alegre	Telêmaco Borba
Palestra Itália (PR)	Curitiba
Pinheiros (PR)	Curitiba
Ponta Grossa	Ponta Grossa
Roma	Apucarana
União Bandeirante	Bandeirantes

=== Pernambuco ===
State championship: Campeonato Pernambucano

Club	Location
1º de Maio	Petrolina
Afogados	Afogados da Ingazeira
América (PE)	Paulista
Araripina	Araripina
Belo Jardim	Belo Jardim
Cabense	Cabo de Santo Agostinho
Central	Caruaru
Centro Limoeirense	Limoeiro
Decisão	Bonito
Estudantes	Timbaúba
Ferroviário (PE)	Serra Talhada
Ferroviário do Recife	Recife
Flamengo de Arcoverde	Arcoverde
Íbis	Olinda
Itacuruba	Itacuruba
Manchete	Recife
Náutico	Recife
Paulistano	Paulista
Petrolina	Petrolina
Porto (PE)	Caruaru
Retrô	Camaragibe
Salgueiro	Salgueiro
Santa Cruz	Recife
Serrano (PE)	Serra Talhada
Sete de Setembro	Garanhuns
Sport	Recife
Timbaúba	Timbaúba
Vera Cruz	Vitória de Santo Antão
Vitória (PE)	Vitória de Santo Antão
Ypiranga	Santa Cruz do Capibaribe
Unibol	Paulista
Vitória das Tabocas	Vitória de Santo Antão

==== Defunct clubs ====
Club	Location
Flamengo (PE)	Recife
Torre	Recife
Tramways	Recife

=== Piauí ===
State championship: Campeonato Piauiense

Club	Location
4 de Julho	Piripiri
Altos	Altos
Auto Esporte (PI)	Teresina
Barras	Barras
Caiçara	Campo Maior
Comercial (PI)	Campo Maior
Cori-Sabbá	Floriano
Flamengo (PI)	Teresina
Fluminense (PI)	Teresina
Parnahyba	Parnaíba
Piauí	Teresina
Picos	Picos
Princesa do Sul	Altos, Piauí state
Ríver	Teresina
Tiradentes	Teresina

==== Defunct clubs ====
Club	Location
Botafogo (PI)	Teresina

=== Rio de Janeiro ===
State championship: Campeonato Carioca

Club	Location
America	Rio de Janeiro
América (TR)	Três Rios
Americano	Campos dos Goytacazes
Angra dos Reis	Angra dos Reis
Aperibeense	Aperibé
Artsul	Nova Iguaçu
Audax Rio de Janeiro	São João de Meriti
Bangu	Rio de Janeiro
Barcelona	Rio de Janeiro
Barra Mansa	Barra Mansa
Barra da Tijuca	Rio de Janeiro
Bela Vista	Niterói
Boavista	Saquarema
Bonsucesso	Rio de Janeiro
Botafogo	Rio de Janeiro
Bréscia	Magé
Cabofriense	Cabo Frio
Campo Grande	Rio de Janeiro
Campos	Campos dos Goytacazes
Carapebus	Carapebus
Cardoso Moreira	Cardoso Moreira
Casimiro de Abreu	Casimiro de Abreu
Castelo Branco	Rio de Janeiro
Ceres	Rio de Janeiro
CFZ do Rio	Rio de Janeiro
Duque de Caxias	Duque de Caxias
Duquecaxiense	Duque de Caxias
Entrerriense	Três Rios
Faissal	Itaboraí
Fênix	Barra Mansa
Flamengo	Rio de Janeiro
Fluminense	Rio de Janeiro
Fonseca	Niterói
Friburguense	Nova Friburgo
Futuro Bem Próximo	Rio de Janeiro
Goytacaz	Campos dos Goytacazes
Grêmio Mangaratibense	Mangaratiba
Guanabara	Araruama
Imperial	Petrópolis
Itaboraí	Itaboraí
Itaperuna	Itaperuna
Juventus (RJ)	Rio de Janeiro
La Coruña	Rio de Janeiro
Macaé	Macaé
Madureira	Rio de Janeiro
Mesquita	Mesquita
Nilópolis	Nilópolis
Nova Cidade	Nilópolis
Nova Iguaçu	Nova Iguaçu
Olaria	Rio de Janeiro
Portuguesa (RJ)	Rio de Janeiro
Quissamã	Quissamã
Resende	Resende
Rio Bonito	Rio Bonito
Rio Branco (RJ)	Campos dos Goytacazes
Rubro Social	Araruama
Sampaio Corrêa (RJ)	Saquarema
Santa Cruz (RJ)	Rio de Janeiro
São Cristóvão	Rio de Janeiro
São João da Barra	São João da Barra
Serra Macaense	Macaé
Serrano	Petrópolis
Teresópolis	Teresópolis
Tigres do Brasil	Rio de Janeiro
Tio Sam	Niterói
Tomazinho	São João de Meriti
União Central	Rio de Janeiro
União de Marechal Hermes	Rio de Janeiro
Vasco da Gama	Rio de Janeiro
Villa Rio	Rio de Janeiro
Volta Redonda	Volta Redonda

==== Defunct clubs ====
Club	Location
Barra (RJ)	Teresópolis
Bayer	Belford Roxo
Eletrovapo	Niterói
Football and Athletic	Rio de Janeiro
Mangueira	Rio de Janeiro
Manufatora	Niterói
Paissandu	Rio de Janeiro
Rio Cricket	Rio de Janeiro
Rodoviário	Piraí

=== Rio Grande do Norte ===
State championship: Campeonato Potiguar

Club	Location
ABC	Natal
Alecrim	Natal
América de Natal	Natal
ASSU	Assu
Baraúnas	Mossoró
Centenário Pauferrense	Pau dos Ferros
Coríntians	Caicó
Força e Luz	Natal
Globo	Ceará-Mirim
Macau	Macau
Palmeira	Goianinha
Pauferrense	Pau dos Ferros
Potiguar	Mossoró
Potiguar de Parnamirim	Parnamirim
Potyguar de Currais Novos	Currais Novos
Santa Cruz (RN)	Santa Cruz
Santa Cruz de Natal	Natal
São Gonçalo	São Gonçalo do Amarante

=== Rio Grande do Sul ===
State championship: Campeonato Gaúcho

Club	Location
14 de Julho	Santana do Livramento
15 de Novembro	Campo Bom
Aimoré	São Leopoldo
Atlético Carazinho	Carazinho
Avenida	Santa Cruz do Sul
Bagé	Bagé
Brasil de Farroupilha	Farroupilha
Brasil de Pelotas	Pelotas
Canoas	Canoas
Canoas	Canoas
Caxias	Caxias do Sul
Cerâmica	Gravataí
Cruzeiro (RS)	Porto Alegre
Esportivo	Bento Gonçalves
Farroupilha	Pelotas
Garibaldi	Garibaldi
Gaúcho	Passo Fundo
Glória	Vacaria
Grêmio	Porto Alegre
Grêmio Santanense	Santana do Livramento
Guarani	Venâncio Aires
Guarany de Bagé	Bagé
Guarany de Camaquã	Camaquã
Guarany de Cruz Alta	Cruz Alta, Rio Grande do Sul
Igrejinha	Igrejinha
Internacional	Porto Alegre
Internacional (SM)	Santa Maria
Juventude	Caxias do Sul
Juventus (RS)	Santa Rosa
Lajeadense	Lajeado
Milan	Júlio de Castilhos
Mundo Novo	Três Coroas
Nacional (RS)	Cruz Alta
Nova Prata	Nova Prata
Novo Hamburgo	Novo Hamburgo
Panambi	Panambi
Passo Fundo	Passo Fundo
Pedrabranca	Alvorada
Pelotas	Pelotas
Porto Alegre	Porto Alegre
Rio Grande	Rio Grande
Riograndense	Santa Maria
Riopardense	Rio Pardo
Santa Cruz (RS)	Santa Cruz do Sul
Santo Ângelo	Santo Ângelo
São Borja	São Borja
São Gabriel	São Gabriel
São José de Porto Alegre	Porto Alegre
São Luiz	Ijuí
São Paulo (RS)	Rio Grande
Sapucaiense	Sapucaia do Sul
Três Passos	Três Passos
Tupy	Crissiumal
União Frederiquense	Frederico Westphalen
Uruguaiana	Uruguaiana
Veranópolis	Veranópolis
Ypiranga	Erechim

==== Defunct clubs ====
Club	Location
Americano de Porto Alegre	Porto Alegre
Força e Luz	Porto Alegre
Renner	Porto Alegre

=== Rondônia ===
State championship: Campeonato Rondoniense

Club	Location
Ajax	Vilhena
Ariquemes	Ariquemes
Barcelona (RO)	Vilhena
CFA	Porto Velho
Cruzeiro (RO)	Porto Velho
Espigão	Espigão d'Oeste
Genus	Porto Velho
Grêmio Recreativo	Espigão d'Oeste
Guajará	Guajará-Mirim
Guaporé	Rolim de Moura
Ji-Paraná	Ji-Paraná
Moto Clube	Porto Velho
Pimentense	Pimenta Bueno
Porto Velho	Porto Velho
Real Ariquemes	Ariquemes
Rolim de Moura	Rolim de Moura
Rondoniense	Porto Velho
Shallon	Porto Velho
União Cacoalense	Cacoal
Vilhena	Vilhena
Vilhenense	Vilhena

==== Defunct clubs ====
Club	Location
Ariquemes	Ariquemes
Ferroviário (RO)	Porto Velho
Flamengo	Porto Velho
Ulbra Ji-Paraná	Ji-Paraná

=== Roraima ===
State championship: Campeonato Roraimense

Club	Location
Atlético Roraima	Boa Vista
Baré	Boa Vista
GAS	Boa Vista
Náutico (RR)	Boa Vista
Progresso	Mucajaí
Real	São Luiz do Anauá
Rio Negro (RR)	Boa Vista
River (RR)	Boa Vista
São Raimundo (RR)	Boa Vista

=== Santa Catarina ===
State championship: Campeonato Catarinense

Club	Location
Almirante Barroso	Itajaí
Atlético Tubarão	Tubarão
Avaí	Florianópolis
Barra (SC)	Itajaí
Blumenau	Blumenau
Brusque	Brusque
Caçador	Caçador
Camboriú	Camboriú
Carlos Renaux	Brusque
Caxias (SC)	Joinville
Chapecoense	Chapecó
Concórdia AC	Concórdia
Criciúma	Criciúma
Figueirense	Florianópolis
Fluminense (SC)	Joinville
Guarani de Palhoça	Palhoça
Hercílio Luz	Tubarão
Hermann Aichinger	Ibirama
Imbituba	Imbituba
Inter de Lages	Lages
Joinville	Joinville
Juventus de Jaraguá	Jaraguá do Sul
Juventus de Seara	Seara
Marcílio Dias	Itajaí
Metropolitano	Blumenau
Operários Mafrenses	Mafra
Porto (SC)	Porto União
Próspera	Criciúma
Tubarão	Tubarão
Xanxerense	Xanxerê

==== Defunct clubs ====
Club	Location
Alto Vale	Rio do Sul
América (SC)	Joinville
Concórdia FC	Concórdia
Lauro Müller	Itajaí
Metropol	Criciúma
Olímpico	Blumenau
Paula Ramos	Florianópolis
Paysandu (SC)	Brusque

=== Sergipe ===
State championship: Campeonato Sergipano

Club	Location
Amadense	Tobias Barreto
América (SE)	Propriá
Boca Júnior	Cristinápolis
Boquinhense	Boquim
Confiança	Aracaju
Coritiba (SE)	Itabaiana
Cotinguiba	Aracaju
Estanciano	Estância
Gararu	Gararu
Guarany (SE)	Porto da Folha
Itabaiana	Itabaiana
Lagartense	Lagarto
Lagarto	Lagarto
Laranjeiras	Laranjeiras
Maruinense	Maruim
Olímpico	Itabaianinha
Pirambu	Pirambu
Propriá	Propriá
Riachuelo	Riachuelo
River Plate	Carmópolis
São Domingos	São Domingos
Sergipe	Aracaju
Sete de Junho	Tobias Barreto
Socorrense	Nossa Senhora do Socorro
Vasco-SE	Aracaju

=== Tocantins ===
State championship: Campeonato Tocantinense

Club	Location
Araguaína	Araguaína
Alvorada	Alvorada
Colinas	Colinas do Tocantins
Guaraí	Guaraí
Gurupi	Gurupi
Intercap	Paraíso do Tocantins
Interporto	Porto Nacional
Kaburé	Colinas do Tocantins
Palmas	Palmas
São José (TO)	Palmas
Sparta	Araguaína
Tocantinópolis	Tocantinópolis
Tocantins	Palmas
Tocantins de Miracema	Miracema do Tocantins

== See also ==
- List of women's football clubs in Brazil
