= 2013 Campeonato Sul-Mato-Grossense =

Campeonato Sul-Mato-Grossense de Futebol
- Season: 2013
- Champions: CENE
- Relegated: SERC; Corumbaense
- Copa do Brasil: CENE; Naviraiense
- Matches played: 98
- Goals scored: 312 (3.18 per match)
- Top goalscorer: Careca (CENE) - 19 goals

The 2013 Campeonato Sul-Mato-Grossense de Futebol was the 35th edition of the Mato Grosso do Sul's top professional football league. The competition began on January 19, and ended on May 5. CENE won the championship by the 5th time, while SERC and Corumbaense were relegated.

== Format ==
In the initial stage, teams are divided into two groups, playing each other twice. The last-placed team from each group is relegated, and the top four teams advance to the quarterfinals. The playoffs consist of two-legged matches.

=== Qualifications ===
The champion and the runner-up qualify to the 2014 Copa do Brasil.

== Participating teams ==
Club	Home city	2012 result
Águia Negra	Rio Brilhante	1st
Aquidauanense	Aquidauana	6th
CENE	Campo Grande	8th
Comercial	Campo Grande	10th
Corumbaense	Corumbá	2nd (2nd division)
Itaporã	Itaporã	11th
Ivinhema	Ivinhema	5th
Maracaju	Maracaju	9th
Misto	Três Lagoas	4th
Naviraiense	Naviraí	2nd
Novoperário	Campo Grande	1st (2nd division)
SERC	Chapadão do Sul	3rd
Sete de Setembro	Dourados	7th
URSO	Mundo Novo	12th

== First stage ==
=== Standings ===
==== Group A ====
Pos	Team	Pld	W	D	L	GF	GA	GD	Pts	Qualification or relegation
1	CENE	12	9	1	2	32	14	+18	28	Advanced to the Quarterfinals
2	Aquidauanense	12	6	3	3	18	12	+6	21	Advanced to the Quarterfinals
3	Novoperário	12	5	2	5	18	21	−3	17	Advanced to the Quarterfinals
4	Misto	12	4	5	3	22	22	0	17	Advanced to the Quarterfinals
5	Comercial-MS	12	3	3	6	17	22	−5	12	
6	Maracaju	12	3	3	6	14	22	−8	12	
7	SERC (R)	12	2	3	7	20	28	−8	9	Relegated

(R) Relegated

==== Group B ====
Pos	Team	Pld	W	D	L	GF	GA	GD	Pts	Qualification or relegation
1	Ivinhema	12	7	4	1	21	12	+9	25	Advanced to the Quarterfinals
2	Naviraiense	12	5	4	3	20	16	+4	19	Advanced to the Quarterfinals
3	Itaporã	12	5	3	4	22	16	+6	18	Advanced to the Quarterfinals
4	Sete de Setembro	12	5	3	4	18	15	+3	18	Advanced to the Quarterfinals
5	Águia Negra	12	4	4	4	22	20	+2	16	
6	URSO	12	3	3	6	13	22	−9	12	
7	Corumbaense (R)	12	1	3	8	12	27	−15	6	Relegated

Rules for classification: 1) points; 2) goal difference; 3) number of goals scored.
(R) Relegated

=== Results ===
==== Group A ====
Home \ Away	AQU	CENE	ECC	MJU	MIS	NOP	SERC
Aquidauanense		0–0	1–0	1–0	3–0	1–2	1–0
CENE	2–1		2–1	4–1	3–2	3–1	3–1
Comercial-MS	3–1	0–5		1–1	2–2	1–1	5–1
Maracaju	1–4	1–3	2–1		1–1	2–1	1–2
Misto	2–2	2–1	3–0	1–0		3–3	2–2
Novoperário	0–1	0–5	2–1	1–2	2–0		2–0
SERC	2–2	4–1	1–2	2–2	3–4	2–3	

Legend: Blue = home team win; Yellow = draw; Red = away team win.

==== Group B ====
Home \ Away	AGN	COB	IPR	IVI	NAV	SET	URSO
Águia Negra		1–0	1–2	2–3	2–1	1–2	2–2
Corumbaense	1–3		2–2	1–2	1–2	2–1	2–3
Itaporã	2–1	6–0		1–2	1–2	1–0	3–0
Ivinhema	2–4	0–0	3–0		1–1	1–1	2–0
Naviraiense	2–2	2–2	2–2	0–1		1–2	3–0
Sete de Setembro	1–1	4–1	1–1	1–3	1–2		2–0
URSO	2–2	1–0	2–1	1–1	1–2	1–2	

Legend: Blue = home team win; Yellow = draw; Red = away team win.

== Final stage ==
Quarterfinals
1A	CENE	3	3	6
4B	Sete de Setembro	0	0	0
1B	Ivinhema	2	3	5
4A	Misto	4	1	5
2B	Naviraiense	2	2	4
3A	Novoperário	2	2	4
2A	Aquidauanense	1	1	2
3B	Itaporã	1	2	3

Semifinals
1A	CENE	1	2
1B	Ivinhema	0	0	0
2B	Naviraiense	1	1	2
3B	Itaporã	0	2	2

Final
1A	CENE	2	4	6
2B	Naviraiense	1	0	1

CENE won the 2013 Campeonato Sul-Mato-Grossense.
