= 2023 Campeonato Sul-Mato-Grossense =

Campeonato Sul-Mato-Grossense
- Season: 2023
- Champions: Costa Rica
- Relegated: Comercial; Operário de Caarapó
- Série D: Costa Rica
- Copa do Brasil: Costa Rica; Operário
- Copa Verde: Costa Rica
- Matches played: 40
- Goals scored: 101 (2.53 per match)
- Biggest home win: Dourados 6–0 Coxim (2 April 2023)
- Biggest away win: Coxim 1–4 Operário (8 February 2023)
- Highest scoring: Novo 4–4 Operário de Caarapó (26 February 2023)

The 2023 Campeonato Sul-Mato-Grossense was the 45th edition of Mato Grosso do Sul's top professional football league. The competition started on 22 January and ended on 30 April. Costa Rica won the championship for the 2nd time.

== Participating teams ==
Team	City	2022 result
Aquidauanense	Aquidauana	6th
Chapadão	Chapadão do Sul	5th
Comercial	Campo Grande	8th
Costa Rica	Costa Rica	3rd
Coxim	Coxim	7th
Dourados	Dourados	4th
Ivinhema	Ivinhema	3rd (Série B)
Novo	Campo Grande	2nd (Série B)
Operário de Caarapó	Caarapó	1st (Série B)
Operário	Campo Grande	1st

Note

- Naviraiense (2nd in 2022) withdrew from the tournament and was replaced by Ivinhema.

== Group stage ==
=== Group A ===
Pos	Team	Pld	W	D	L	GF	GA	GD	Pts	Qualification or relegation
1	Costa Rica (A)	8	6	1	1	15	6	+9	19	Advance to the Final stage
2	Operário (A)	8	5	0	3	13	8	+5	15	Advance to the Final stage
3	SERC (A)	8	4	1	3	11	10	+1	13	Advance to the Final stage
4	Coxim (A)	8	2	2	4	4	11	−7	8	Advance to the Final stage
5	Comercial (R)	8	0	2	6	4	12	−8	2	2024 Campeonato Sul-Mato-Grossense Série B

Source: Globo Esporte
(A) Advance to a further round; (R) Relegated

=== Group B ===
Pos	Team	Pld	W	D	L	GF	GA	GD	Pts	Qualification or relegation
1	Dourados (A)	8	6	1	1	11	5	+6	19	Advance to the Final stage
2	Ivinhema (A)	8	3	2	3	14	9	+5	11	Advance to the Final stage
3	Novo (A)	8	3	2	3	11	10	+1	11	Advance to the Final stage
4	Aquidauanense (A)	8	3	1	4	9	15	−6	10	Advance to the Final stage
5	Operário de Caarapó (R)	8	1	2	5	9	15	−6	5	2024 Campeonato Sul-Mato-Grossense Série B

Source: Globo Esporte
(A) Advance to a further round; (R) Relegated

== Final stage ==
=== Quarter-finals ===
Team 1	Agg.	Team 2	1st leg	2nd leg
Aquidauanense	1–2	Costa Rica	1–0	0–2
SERC	4–5	Ivinhema	0–3	4–2
Coxim	0–8	Dourados	0–2	0–6
Novo	3–4	Operário	2–0	1–4

=== Semi-finals ===
Team 1	Agg.	Team 2	1st leg	2nd leg
Ivinhema	1–1	Costa Rica	0–1	1–0
Operário	2–1	Dourados	2–1	0–0

=== Finals ===
Team 1	Agg.	Team 2	1st leg	2nd leg
Operário	1–1	Costa Rica	0–0	1–1
