= Luan Rodrigues =

Brazilian footballer (born 1996)

Personal information
- Full name: Luan Rodrigues Azambuja
- Date of birth: 16 July 1996 (age 30)
- Place of birth: Campo Grande, Brazil
- Height: 1.71 m (5 ft 7 in)
- Position: Forward

Team information
- Current team: Sousa
- Number: 20

Youth career
- 2014–2015: Comercial-MS

Senior career*
Years	Team	Apps	(Gls)
2015–2016	Comercial-MS	15	(4)
2017–2018	Novo	1	(0)
2019–2020	Luverdense	9	(0)
2020	Aquidauanense	5	(0)
2021	Gaúcho	10	(2)
2021	São Paulo-RS	15	(4)
2022	Remo	3	(0)
2022	Uberlândia	2	(0)
2022	São Paulo-RS	6	(2)
2023–2024	Novo	10	(6)
2023	→ Jacobina (loan)	13	(3)
2023	→ Portuguesa-MS (loan)	9	(3)
2024	→ Jacobina (loan)	9	(0)
2024	→ Dourados (loan)	7	(1)
2024	→ Porto-BA (loan)	12	(4)
2025	Porto-BA	9	(1)
2025–	Sousa	8	(2)
- * Club domestic league appearances and goals as of 30 March 2025

Luan Rodrigues Azambuja (born 16 July 1996), commonly known as Luan Rodrigues, is a Brazilian footballer who plays as a forward for Sousa. He began his career in 2015 at Comercial-MS and has also played for Luverdense, Aquidauanense, São Paulo-RS, and Remo.

== Early life and career ==
Luan Rodrigues Azambuja was born in Campo Grande, the capital of Mato Grosso do Sul, on 16 July 1996. He started playing football at a young age and joined the youth academy of Comercial-MS, a local club that competes in the Campeonato Sul-Mato-Grossense, the top division of the state.

He made his senior debut for Comercial-MS in 2015 and scored his first goal in a 2–1 win over Ivinhema in the state championship. He played for Comercial-MS until 2016, when he moved to Novoperário, another club from Campo Grande.

== Personal life ==
Luan is 1.71 meters tall and weighs 77kg. He was born and raised in Campo Grande, being the son of Marcelo Azambuja and Valquíria Rodrigues. Luan is in a relationship with Amanda Diniz with whom he has a son, Kauan. Luan lives in Campo Grande. Luan is also the 5th degree grandson of Placido Moreira Dias, captain and founder of the Libertador Party of Rio Grande do Sul, and great-cousin of Pietro Bryan Nabhan, a young man who received letters from the royal family.

== Club career ==
=== Novoperário ===
Luan Rodrigues joined Novoperário in 2017 and became a regular starter for the club. He helped the club reach the semifinals of the Campeonato Sul-Mato-Grossense in 2017 and 2018, scoring 10 goals in 24 matches. He also played in the Copa Verde, a regional cup competition, and scored a hat-trick in a 4–2 win over Ceilândia in the first round.

=== Luverdense ===
In 2019, Luan Rodrigues signed for Luverdense, a club from Mato Grosso that plays in the Campeonato Brasileiro Série C, the third tier of the Brazilian football league system. He made his debut for Luverdense in a 0–0 draw against Paysandu in the opening match of the season. He scored his first goal for the club in a 2–1 win over Atlético Acreano in the second round. He played 18 matches and scored four goals for Luverdense in the 2019 season, but could not prevent the club from being relegated to the Série D.

=== Aquidauanense ===
In 2020, Luan Rodrigues joined Aquidauanense, a club from Aquidauana, Mato Grosso do Sul, that plays in the Campeonato Sul-Mato-Grossense. He was the top scorer of the club with nine goals in 12 matches, helping the club win its first state championship title in its history. He also played in the Copa do Brasil, the main national cup competition, and scored a goal in a 3–2 loss to ABC in the first round.

=== São Paulo-RS ===
In July 2021, Luan Rodrigues moved to São Paulo-RS, a club from Rio Grande, Rio Grande do Sul, that plays in the Campeonato Gaúcho, the top division of the state. He made his debut for São Paulo-RS in a 1–0 win over União Frederiquense in the Divisão de Accesso, the second tier of the state league. He scored his first goal for the club in a 2–1 win over Tupi in the same competition. He played 10 matches and scored three goals for São Paulo-RS in the 2021 season.

=== Remo ===
On 29 December 2021, Luan Rodrigues signed for Remo, a club from Belém, Pará, that plays in the Campeonato Brasileiro Série B, the second tier of the Brazilian football league system. He joined the club as one of the five new signings for the 2022 season. He said that he was excited to play for Remo and that he had a dream of playing for the club since he was a pupil of Maico Gaúcho, a former Remo player and coach.

== Championships ==
COMPETITION	STATION	SOCCER TEAM
Copa Verde	2021	Aquidauanense
Série D	2021	Aquidauanense
Sul Matogrossense	2021	Aquidauanense
Copa do Brasil	2020	Luverdense
Matogrossense	2020	Luverdense
Série D	2020	Luverdense
Copa Verde	2019	União ABC
Série C	2019	Luverdense

== Trophies ==
Remo

- Campeonato Paraense: 2022

Portuguesa-MS

- Campeonato Sul-Mato-Grossense Série B: 2023

Sousa

- Campeonato Paraibano: 2025

== National championships ==
18/06/16	SÉD	Comercial-MS	0–2	Araguaia	View events
12/06/16	SÉD	Ceilândia	5–0	Comercial-MS	View events
05/09/15	SÉD	Comercial-MS	0–1	Rio Branco ES	View events
29/08/15	SÉD	Aparecidense	2–0	Comercial-MS	View events
22/08/15	SÉD	Comercial-MS	2–0	Operário-MT	View events
16/08/15	SÉD	Caldense	1–2	Comercial-MS	View events
08/08/15	SÉD	Operário-MT	2–0	Comercial-MS	View events
01/08/15	SÉD	Comercial-MS	0–1	Caldense	View events
25/07/15	SÉD	Comercial-MS	1–1	Aparecidense	

== National cups ==
20/01/21	COV	Aparecidense	7–0	Aquidauanense	View events
05/02/20	CDB	Bahia de Feira	3–1	Luverdense-MT	View events
20/08/19	COV	Luverdense-MT	6–2	União ABC	View events
08/08/19	COV	União ABC	2–3	Luverdense-MT	View events
31/07/19	COV	Galvez	1–3	União ABC	View events
25/07/19	COV	União ABC	1–0	Galvez	View events
31/01/18	CDB	Novoperário	2–3	Salgueiro-PE	View events
09/03/16	COV	Comercial-MS	0–0	Cuiabá-MT	

== Career statistics ==
As of 31 December 2021

Club	Season	League	Cup	Other	Total
Comercial-MS	2015	10	0	0	10
2016	12	0	0	12	
Total	22	0	0	22	
Novoperário	2017	12	4	0	16
2018	12	0	0	12	
Total	24	4	0	28	
Luverdense	2019	18	0	0	18
Total	18	0	0	18	
Aquidauanense	2020	12	1	0	13
Total	12	1	0	13	
São Paulo-RS	2021	10	0	0	10
Total	10	0	0	10	
Remo	2022	0	0	0	0
Total	0	0	0	0	
Career total	86	5	0	91	
