= Campeonato Sul-Mato-Grossense Série B =

Football league in Mato Grosso do Sul, Brazil

- Organising body: FFMS
- Founded: 1987; 39 years ago
- Country: Brazil
- State: Mato Grosso do Sul
- Level on pyramid: 2
- Promotion to: Campeonato Sul-Mato-Grossense
- Current champions: Aquidauanense (2nd title) (2026)
- Most championships: CE Naviraiense (3 titles each)
- Website: FFMS Official website

The Campeonato Sul-Mato-Grossense Série B is the second tier of the professional state football league in the Brazilian state of Mato Grosso do Sul. It is run by the Mato Grosso do Sul Football Federation (FFMS).

== List of champions ==
Season	Champions	Runners-up
1987	EASA (1)	Gianini
1988	SE Naviraiense (1)	Sidrolândia
1989	Angivi (1)	Nova Andradina
1990–2000	Not held	
2001	Águia Negra (1)	Coxim
2002–2003	Not held	
2004	Maracaju (1)	Rio Verde
2005	Sete de Setembro (1)	Coxim
2006	Corumbaense (1)	Paranaibense
2007	CE Naviraiense (1)	Comercial
2008	Itaporã (1)	Nova Andradina
2009	Chapadão (1)	Mundo Novo
2010	Ponta Porã (1)	Maracaju
2011	Misto (1)	Colorado
2012	Novoperário (1)	Corumbaense
2013	Ubiratan (1)	Costa Rica
2014	Chapadão (2)	Corumbaense
2015	Itaporã (2)	Operário
2016	URSO (1)	União
2017	Operário AC (1)	Nova Andradina
2018	Aquidauanense (1)	Corumbaense
2019	Pontaporanense (1)	Maracaju
2020	Dourados (1)	Três Lagoas
2021	CE Naviraiense (2)	Coxim
2022	Operário AC (2)	Novo
2023	Portuguesa (1)	Corumbaense
2024	CE Naviraiense (3)	Águia Negra
2025	Bataguassu (1)	CR Aquidauana
2026	Aquidauanense (2)	Misto

Notes

- Novo and Novoperário are the same club.
- Operário AC as moved from Dourados to Caarapó.
- SE Naviraiense and CE Naviraiense are not the same team.
- Portuguesa was renamed to Pantanal

== Titles by team ==
Teams in bold stills active.

Rank	Club	Winners	Winning years
1	**CE Naviraiense**	3	2007, 2021, 2024
2	**Aquidauanense**	2	2018, 2026
2	**Chapadão**	2	2009, 2014
2	Itaporã	2	2008, 2015
2	**Operário AC**	2	2017, 2022
6	**Águia Negra**	1	2001
6	Angivi	1	1989
6	**Bataguassu**	1	2025
6	**Corumbaense**	1	2006
6	**Dourados**	1	2020
6	EASA	1	1987
6	**Maracaju**	1	2004
6	Misto	1	2011
6	SE Naviraiense	1	1988
6	**Novo**	1	2012
6	Ponta Porã	1	2010
6	Pontaporanense	1	2019
6	**Portuguesa**	1	2023
6	Sete de Setembro	1	2005
6	Ubiratan	1	2013
6	**URSO**	1	2016

=== By city ===
City	Championships	Clubs
Dourados	4	Dourados (1), Operário AC (1), Sete de Setembro (1), Ubiratan (1)
Naviraí	4	CE Naviraiense (3), SE Naviraiense (1)
Aquidauana	2	Aquidauanense (2)
Campo Grande	2	Novo (1), Portuguesa (1)
Chapadão do Sul	2	Chapadão (2)
Corumbá	2	Corumbaense (1), EASA (1)
Itaporã	2	Itaporã (2)
Ponta Porã	2	Ponta Porã (1), Pontaporanense (1)
Bataguassu	1	Bataguassu (1)
Caarapó	1	Operário AC (1)
Ivinhema	1	Angivi (1)
Maracaju	1	Maracaju (1)
Mundo Novo	1	URSO (1)
Rio Brilhante	1	Águia Negra (1)
Três Lagoas	1	Misto (1)

== 2008 Campeonato Sul-Mato-Grossense Série C ==
The Campeonato Sul-Mato-Grossense Série C was the third level of football league of the state of Mato Grosso do Sul, Brazil. It was played only once, in 2008, and had the participation of teams from the amateur level in addition to affiliates who were not up to date with the federation fees.

40 clubs divided in 10 groups of 4. The 10 groups champions and the 6 better second places advanced to the Round of 16. The final phase was played in two legs with the away goal rule.

=== Champions ===
Season	Champions	Runners-up
2008	Itaporã	Miranda
