= Alex Cruz (footballer, born 1985) =

Brazilian footballer

Personal information
- Full name: Alex José da Cruz
- Date of birth: January 11, 1985 (age 41)
- Place of birth: Fátima do Sul (MS), Brazil
- Height: 1.77 m (5 ft 9 1/2 in)
- Position: Attacking midfielder

Team information
- Current team: Ivinhema

Senior career*
Years	Team	Apps	(Gls)
2007	CENE		
2007	Americano		
2007	Comercial		
2008	Naviraiense		
2008–2009	Nova Andradina		
2009	Ivinhema		
2009	Flamengo		
2010	Guarani		
2010	Corumbaense		
2011	Ferroviária		
2012	Cascavel		
2013	Ivinhema		
2013–2014	Ubiratan		
2014	Itaporã		
2017–	Ivinhema		
- * Club domestic league appearances and goals as of May 19, 2011 ‡ National team caps and goals as of May 19, 2011

Alex José da Cruz (born January 11, 1985) simply known as Alex Cruz a Brazilian attacking midfielder. He currently plays for Ferroviária.

== Career statistics ==
(Correct as of May 19, 2011)

Club	Season	State League		Brazilian Série A		Copa do Brasil		Copa Libertadores		Copa Sudamericana		Total	
Club	Season	Apps	Goals	Apps	Goals	Apps	Goals	Apps	Goals	Apps	Goals	Apps	Goals
Flamengo	2009	0	0	2	0	0	0	-	-	0	0	0	0
Total		0	0	2	0	0	0	-	-	0	0	0	0
Career total		0	0	2	0	0	0	-	-	0	0	0	0

== Honours ==
Ivinhema

- Campeonato Sul-Mato-Grossense: 2008

Flamengo

- Campeonato Brasileiro Série A: 2009
