= Gabriel Affonso =

Brazilian footballer

Personal information
- Full name: Gabriel Affonso de Jesus
- Date of birth: 15 November 1998 (age 28)
- Place of birth: São Paulo, Brazil
- Height: 1.95 m (6 ft 5 in)
- Position: Goalkeeper

Team information
- Current team: São José-SP

Youth career
- 2016: São José dos Campos
- 2016: Juventus-SP
- 2017–2018: Taboão da Serra

Senior career*
Years	Team	Apps	(Gls)
2019	Taboão da Serra	2	(0)
2019	VOCEM	13	(0)
2020	Paulista	0	(0)
2020	Francana	1	(0)
2021–2023	Portuguesa Santista	0	(0)
2021	→ Paulista (loan)	3	(0)
2022	→ Ivinhema (loan)	5	(0)
2024	Juazeirense	0	(0)
2024	Naviraiense	8	(0)
2025	Sertãozinho	20	(0)
2025–	São José-SP	15	(0)
2026	→ Noroeste (loan)	9	(0)
2026	→ Maringá (loan)	0	(0)
- * Club domestic league appearances and goals as of 13:45, 31 August 2026 (UTC)

Gabriel Affonso de Jesus (born 15 November 1998), known as Gabriel Affonso, is a Brazilian footballer who plays as a goalkeeper for São José-SP.

== Career ==
Born in São Paulo, Gabriel Affonso played for São José dos Campos, Juventus-SP and Taboão da Serra as a youth, before making his senior debut with the club in the 2019 Campeonato Paulista Série A3. In April of that year, he moved to VOCEM in the Campeonato Paulista Segunda Divisão, where he was a regular starter.

In the 2020 season, Gabriel Affonso represented Paulista and Francana, but only featured in one match for the latter, and signed for Portuguesa Santista on 27 January 2021. A backup option, he subsequently returned to Paulista on loan, and also played for Ivinhema also in a temporary deal.

Back to Briosa for the 2023 season, Gabriel Affonso was again a second-choice, and moved to Juazeirense on 3 January 2024. Again rarely used, he was presented in the squad of Naviraiense for the year's Campeonato Sul-Mato-Grossense Série B in September.

In December 2024, Gabriel Affonso joined Sertãozinho for the upcoming season. An undisputed first-choice as the club lifted the Campeonato Paulista Série A3 title, he was also named the best goalkeeper of the competition.

On 16 April 2025, São José-SP announced the signing of Gabriel Affonso. Roughly one year later, he was loaned to Noroeste until the end of the Série D.

Regularly used by Norusca, Gabriel Affonso joined Série C side Maringá also on loan on 30 July 2026.

== Career statistics ==
As of 31 August 2026

Club	Season	League			State League		Cup		Continental		Other		Total	
Club	Season	Division	Apps	Goals	Apps	Goals	Apps	Goals	Apps	Goals	Apps	Goals	Apps	Goals
Taboão da Serra	2019	Paulista A3	—		2	0	—		—		—		2	0
VOCEM	2019	Paulista 2ª Divisão	—		13	0	—		—		—		13	0
Paulista	2020	Paulista A3	—		0	0	—		—		—		0	0
Francana	2020	Paulista 2ª Divisão	—		1	0	—		—		—		1	0
Portuguesa Santista	2021	Paulista A2	—		0	0	—		—		—		0	0
Portuguesa Santista	2022	Paulista A2	—		0	0	—		—		—		0	0
Portuguesa Santista	2023	Paulista A2	—		0	0	—		—		3 (Note: Appearance(s) in Copa Paulista)	0	3	0
Portuguesa Santista	Total		—		0	0	—		—		3	0	3	0
Paulista (loan)	2021	Paulista 2ª Divisão	—		3	0	—		—		—		3	0
Ivinhema (loan)	2022	Sul-Mato-Grossense Série B	—		5	0	—		—		—		5	0
Juazeirense	2024	Série D	0	0	0	0	—		—		2 (Note: Appearance(s) in Copa do Nordeste)	0	2	0
Naviraiense	2024	Sul-Mato-Grossense Série B	—		8	0	—		—		—		8	0
Sertãozinho	2025	Paulista A3	—		20	0	—		—		—		20	0
São José-SP	2025	Paulista A2	—		—		—		—		13	0	13	0
São José-SP	2026	Paulista A2	—		15	0	—		—		—		15	0
São José-SP	Total		—		15	0	—		—		13	0	28	0
Noroeste (loan)	2026	Série D	9	0	—		—		—		—		9	0
Maringá (loan)	2026	Série C	0	0	—		—		—		—		0	0
Career total			9	0	67	0	0	0	0	0	17	0	93	0

== Honours ==
Naviraiense

- Campeonato Sul-Mato-Grossense Série B: 2024

Sertãozinho

- Campeonato Paulista Série A3: 2025

Maringá

- Campeonato Brasileiro Série C: 2026

Individual

- Campeonato Paulista Série A3 Best XI: 2025
