= Operário =

Operário may refer to:

== Football clubs ==
=== in Brazil ===
- Operário Futebol Clube (MS) - from Campo Grande, Mato Grosso do Sul.
- Operário Futebol Clube (Várzea Grande) - from Várzea Grande, Mato Grosso.
- Operário Ferroviário Esporte Clube - from Ponta Grossa, Paraná.
- Operário Atlético Clube - from Dourados, Mato Grosso do Sul.
- Operário Esporte Clube - from Manacapuru, Amazonas.
- Sociedade Esportiva e Recreativa Operários Mafrenses - from Joinville, Santa Catarina.
- Novoperário Futebol Clube - from Campo Grande, Mato Grosso do Sul.

=== in Portugal ===
- CD Operário - from Lagoa, Azores.
- Clube Desportivo Operário Meiaviense - from Torres Novas, Santarém

=== in São Tomé and Príncipe ===
- GD Os Operários - from the island of Príncipe.

== Other ==
- Portuguese term for proletarian.
