= Willian Ribeiro =

Brazilian footballer (born 1991)

Personal information
- Full name: Willian Cavalheiro Ribeiro
- Date of birth: 7 January 1991 (age 35)
- Place of birth: Pelotas, Brazil
- Height: 1.73 m (5 ft 8 in)
- Positions: Midfielder; winger; forward

Youth career
- –2010: Internacional

Senior career*
Years	Team	Apps	(Gls)
2011	Desportivo Brasil		
2012	Brasil de Pelotas		
2012	Atlético Tubarão		
2012	Joinville		
2013	Avenida		
2013	Campinense		
2014	Ypiranga-RS		
2014	Guarani-VA		
2015	Veranópolis		
2015	Ypiranga-RS		
2016	Esportivo		
2017	Avenida		
2017	São Paulo		
2017	Brasil de Pelotas		
2018	Ypiranga-RS		
2019	Corumbaense		
2019	São Paulo-RS		
2019	Bagé		
2020	São Paulo-RS		
2020	Águia Negra		
2021	Grêmio Sorriso		
2021	Gaúcho		
2021	São Paulo-RS		
- * Club domestic league appearances and goals as of 2 November 2023

Willian Cavalheiro Ribeiro (born 7 January 1991), better known as Willian Ribeiro, is a Brazilian former professional footballer. He played as a midfielder, winger and forward.

== Career ==
Revealed in Internacional's youth categories, Willian Ribeiro played for several clubs, winning titles at Joinville, Ypiranga and Águia Negra-MS. He also had spells in Brasil de Pelotas and São Paulo de Rio Grande.

On 4 October 2021, in the match of São Paulo vs. Guarani-VA, valid for 2021 Campeonato Gaúcho Série A2, the player attacked referee Rodrigo Crivellaro after receiving a yellow card, even kicking him in the head, leaving him unconscious in the field. Willian was accused of attempted murder in a popular jury and subsequently sentenced to 2 years and 8 months in prison. Due to Brazilian legislation, the player can serve his sentence in a semi-open regime. After the repercussions, the athlete was no longer able to practice as a professional player, even without a formal sporting ban.

In July 2022, playing an amateur match in the city of Pelotas, he was accused by Jones Belém, who was refereeing the game, of also being attacked. The forensic examination, however, was not conclusive.

== Honours ==
Joinville

- Copa Santa Catarina: 2012

Ypiranga

- Campeonato Gaúcho Série A2: 2014

Águia Negra

- Campeonato Sul-Mato-Grossense: 2020
