= Cláudio Mineiro =

Brazilian footballer (born 1952)

Personal information
- Full name: Cláudio Antônio do Nascimento
- Date of birth: 18 July 1952 (age 74)
- Place of birth: Belo Horizonte, Brazil
- Position: Defender

Youth career
- América Mineiro

Senior career*
Years	Team	Apps	(Gls)
1970–1971	América Mineiro		
1972–1975	Atlético Mineiro	205	(12)
1975–1977	Sport Recife		
1977–1979	Corinthians	112	(10)
1979–1980	Internacional		
1981–1982	Cruzeiro		
1982	São José-RS		
1983	XV de Piracicaba		
1983	Ponte Preta		
1984	XV de Piracicaba		
1984–1985	Náutico		
1986	Treze		
1986	Novorizontino		
1987	Corumbaense		
1987	Treze		

Managerial career
- 2005–2006: Corumbaense
- 2007–2008: Pantanal
- 2010: Corumbaense
- 2011: Itaporã
- 2011: Mundo Novo
- * Club domestic league appearances and goals as of 19 February 2024

Cláudio Antônio do Nascimento (born 18 July 1952), better known as Cláudio Mineiro, is a Brazilian former professional footballer and manager, who played as a defender.

== Career ==
Able to play in several defensive positions, Cláudio Mineiro began his career at América Mineiro. In 1972 he transferred to Atlético Mineiro, where he made 205 appearances and scored 12 goals. In 1975, he was part of the state champion squad for Sport, and in 1977, he was a reserve in the Corinthians team that ended the Campeonato Paulista title drought. He was Brazilian champion in 1979 with Internacional and twice state champion with Náutico. He also played for the São Paulo state football team, including scoring a goal against Brazil. After retiring, he became a coach for teams in the state of Mato Grosso do Sul.

== Honours ==
América Mineiro

- Campeonato Mineiro: 1971

Atlético Mineiro

- Taça Belo Horizonte: 1972
- Taça Minas Gerais: 1975

Sport

- Campeonato Pernambucano: 1975

Corinthians

- Campeonato Paulista: 1977

Internacional

- Campeonato Brasileiro: 1979

Náutico

- Campeonato Pernambucano: 1984, 1985
