= Associação Atlética Bataguassu =

Football club in Mato Grosso do Sul, Brazil

Bataguassu
- Full name: Associação Atlética Bataguassu
- Nickname: AAB
- Founded: 26 January 2006; 20 years ago
- Ground: Pereirão
- Capacity: 5,000
- President: Adão da Silva
- Head Coach: Diego Souza
- League: Campeonato Sul-Mato-Grossense
- 2025: Sul-Mato-Grossense Série B, 1st of 6 (champions)
- Website: aabataguassu.com.br
Home colours	Away colours

Associação Atlética Bataguassu, known as Bataguassu, is a Brazilian football team based in Bataguassu, Mato Grosso do Sul. Founded in 2006, they won the Campeonato Sul-Mato-Grossense Série B once.

== History ==
Founded on 26 January 2006, nearly four years after the last appearance of the last club in the city, Corinthians de Bataguassu, the club played in the 2006 and 2007 editions of the Campeonato Sul-Mato-Grossense Série B, but switched to an amateur status after failing to achieve promotion. In April 2025, the club returned to professional football after confirming their place in the year's second division.

With Marquinhos Cambalhota in their squad, Bataguassu achieved a first-ever promotion to the Campeonato Sul-Mato-Grossense as champions; the club scored 27 goals in the tournament, being the best attack. In March 2026, the club reached the Sul-Mato-Grossense finals against Operário, qualifying to the Série D and the Copa do Brasil for the first time ever.

== Honours ==
=== State ===
- Campeonato Sul-Mato-Grossense Série B
  - Winners (1): 2025
