= Preto (footballer, born July 1986) =

Brazilian footballer (1986–2024)

Personal information
- Full name: Jonathan Antenor de Moura Almeida
- Date of birth: 9 July 1986
- Place of birth: Volta Redonda, Brazil
- Date of death: 29 March 2024 (aged 37)
- Place of death: Volta Redonda, Brazil
- Height: 1.81 m (5 ft 11 1/2 in)
- Position: Centre forward

Senior career*
Years	Team	Apps	(Gls)
2009–2012	Ceará	21	(7)
2010	→ Ipatinga (loan)	22	(5)
2011	→ Icasa (loan)	29	(10)
2012	→ Mirassol (loan)		
2012	CRB	13	(2)
2012	Cuiabá		
2013	São José		
2013	Guarany de Sobral		
2013–2014	Volta Redonda		
2015	Águia Negra		
2015	Treze		
2016–2017	Atlético Cearense		
2017	Atlético de Alagoinhas		
2017	Águia Negra		
2017	Anapolina		
2017	Iporá		
2018–2019	Goianésia		
2020	Águia Negra		
2020	Três Lagoas		
2021	Aquidauanense		
- * Club domestic league appearances and goals as of July 11, 2012

Jonathan Antenor de Moura Almeida (9 July 1986 – 29 March 2024), better known as Preto, was a Brazilian footballer who played as a striker. He retired from playing in 2021, and died at the age of 37 in March 2024.
