= Maracaju =

Maracaju may refer to:

- Maracaju, Mato Grosso do Sul, Brazil
- Maracaju Mountain Range, Mato Grosso do Sul, Brazil
- Maracaju Atlético Clube, football club
