= Associação Esportiva Colorado =

Colorado
- Full name: Associação Esportiva Colorado
- Founded: 1978
- Dissolved: 2020; 5 years ago
- Ground: Carecão
- Capacity: 4,000
- 2012: Sul-Mato-Grossense, 13th of 14 (relegated)
Home colors	Away colors

Associação Esportiva Colorado, commonly known as Colorado, was a Brazilian football club based in Caarapó, Mato Grosso do Sul state.

== History ==
The club was founded in 1978. Colorado competed in the Campeonato Sul-Mato-Grossense Second Level in 2010, when they finished in the third position in their group in the First Stage, thus failing to qualify to the Second Stage, but finishing in the fifth place overall. They finished in the second position in the Campeonato Sul-Mato-Grossense Second Level in 2011, after being defeated in the final by Misto and thus achieving promotion to the 2012 Campeonato Sul-Mato-Grossense.

== Stadium ==
Associação Esportiva Colorado played their home games at Estádio Municipal de Caarapó, nicknamed Carecão. The stadium has a maximum capacity of 4,000 people.
