= Dieguinho (footballer, born 1989) =

Brazilian footballer

Personal information
- Full name: Diego Evangelista dos Santos
- Date of birth: September 29, 1989 (age 37)
- Place of birth: Caarapó, Brazil
- Height: 1.69 m (5 ft 6 1/2 in)
- Position: Left back

Youth career
- Fluminense

Senior career*
Years	Team	Apps	(Gls)
2008–2011	Fluminense	23	(0)
2008	→ Paulista (loan)	0	(0)
2010	→ Brasiliense (loan)	12	(1)
2011	→ Bragantino (loan)	3	(0)
2011–2012	Bonsucesso	10	(0)
2013	Tupi	5	(0)
2014	Nacional de Uberaba		
2014	Duque de Caxias	13	(0)
2015	Mogi Mirim	17	(0)
2016	Macaé	13	(0)
2017	Tupi	3	(0)
2017	Volta Redonda	0	(0)
2018	Cabofriense	3	(0)
2018	Sampaio Corrêa-RJ	10	(0)
2020	Pinheiro		
- * Club domestic league appearances and goals

Diego Evangelista dos Santos, better known as Dieguinho (September 29, 1989 in Caarapó) is a Brazilian former footballer.
