= 2014 Campeonato Brasileiro Série D =

Campeonato Brasileiro Série D
- Season: 2014
- Champions: Tombense
- Promoted: Brasil de Pelotas; Londrina; Tombense; Confiança
- Biggest home win: River 7-1 Guarany de Sobral (September 21)
- Biggest away win: São Raimundo-RR 0-6 Rio Branco-AC (September 20); Boavista 0-6 Metropolitano (September 21)

The 2014 Campeonato Brasileiro Série D, was the sixth edition of the Campeonato Brasileiro Serie D, the fourth division of the Brazilian League.

Contested by 40 teams, the season began on July 27, 2014, and ended on November 16, 2014 with the finals, which was won by Tombense.

== Teams 2014 ==
Group A1	Atlético Acreano	Genus	Princesa do Solimões	Rio Branco	Santos-AP	São Raimundo-RR
Group A2	Guarany de Sobral	Interporto	Moto Club	Remo	Ríver-PI	
Group A3	Baraúnas	Campinense	Central	Coruripe	Jacuipense	
Group A4	Betim	Confiança	Globo	Porto	Vitória da Conquista	
Group A5	Anapolina	Brasiliense	Estrela do Norte	Itaporã	Villa Nova	
Group A6	Goianésia	Grêmio Barueri	Luziânia	CEOV	Tombense	
Group A7	Brasil de Pelotas	Cabofriense	Guarani de Palhoça	Ituano	Maringá	
Group A8	Boavista	Londrina	Metropolitano	Pelotas	Penapolense	

== First stage ==
Key to colours in group tables
Group winners, runners-up advance to the Round of 16
Teams which can no longer advance to the Round of 16

=== Group 1 (AC-AP-AM-RO-RR) ===
Team	Pld	W	D	L	GF	GA	GD	Pts
(Acre (state)) Rio Branco	10	6	2	2	18	7	+11	20
(Amapá) Santos-AP	10	5	1	4	16	12	+4	16
(Amazonas (Brazilian state)) Princesa do Solimões	10	5	1	4	15	14	+1	16
(Acre (state)) Atlético Acreano	10	4	2	4	15	14	+1	14
(Rondônia) Genus	10	4	1	5	9	12	−3	13
(Roraima) São Raimundo-RR	10	2	1	7	10	24	−14	7

=== Group 2 (CE-MA-PA-PI-TO) ===
Team	Pld	W	D	L	GF	GA	GD	Pts
(Maranhão) Moto Club	8	4	4	0	15	9	+6	16
(Pará) Remo	8	4	2	2	15	10	+5	14
(Piauí) River	8	3	4	1	16	9	+7	9
(Ceará) Guarany de Sobral	8	2	0	6	9	20	-11	6
(Tocantins) Interporto	8	1	2	5	9	16	−7	5

=== Group 3 (AL-BA-PB-PE-RN) ===
Team	Pld	W	D	L	GF	GA	GD	Pts
(Bahia) Jacuipense	8	4	2	2	14	10	+4	14
(Pernambuco) Central	8	3	3	2	12	6	+6	12
(Alagoas) Coruripe	8	2	4	2	7	8	-1	10
(Paraíba) Campinense	8	2	3	3	7	10	−3	9
(Rio Grande do Norte) Baraúnas	8	2	2	4	8	14	−6	8

=== Group 4 (BA-MG-PE-RN-SE) ===
Team	Pld	W	D	L	GF	GA	GD	Pts
(Sergipe) Confiança	8	5	3	0	16	5	+11	18
(Rio Grande do Norte) Globo	8	5	1	2	15	9	+6	16
(Pernambuco) Porto	8	4	3	1	10	5	+5	15
(Bahia) Vitória da Conquista	8	0	3	5	4	16	−2	3
(Minas Gerais) Betim	8	0	2	6	8	18	−10	2

=== Group 5 (DF-ES-GO-MS-MG) ===
Team	Pld	W	D	L	GF	GA	GD	Pts
(Federal District (Brazil)) Brasiliense	8	4	4	0	14	5	+9	16
(Goiás) Anapolina	8	3	4	1	12	8	+4	13
(Espírito Santo) Estrela do Norte	8	3	3	2	11	11	0	12
(Mato Grosso do Sul) Itaporã	8	2	1	5	5	16	−11	7
(Minas Gerais) Villa Nova	8	1	2	5	11	13	−2	-9

=== Group 6 (DF-GO-MT-MG-SP) ===
Team	Pld	W	D	L	GF	GA	GD	Pts
(Minas Gerais) Tombense	8	6	0	2	15	6	+9	18
(Mato Grosso) CEOV	8	5	1	2	12	6	+6	16
(Federal District (Brazil)) Luziânia	8	4	2	2	11	7	+4	14
(Goiás) Goianésia	8	2	1	5	8	16	−8	7
(São Paulo (state)) Grêmio Barueri	8	1	0	7	4	15	−11	3

=== Group 7 (PR-RJ-RS-SC-SP) ===
Team	Pld	W	D	L	GF	GA	GD	Pts
(Rio Grande do Sul) Brasil de Pelotas	8	5	1	2	8	4	+4	16
(São Paulo (state)) Ituano	8	4	1	3	10	8	+2	13
(Rio de Janeiro (state)) Cabofriense	8	4	0	4	13	16	−3	12
(Paraná (state)) Maringá	8	3	2	3	11	8	+3	11
(Santa Catarina (state)) Guarani de Palhoça	8	1	2	5	8	14	−3	5

=== Group 8 (PR-RJ-RS-SC-SP) ===
Team	Pld	W	D	L	GF	GA	GD	Pts
(Paraná (state)) Londrina	8	5	3	0	11	4	+7	18
(Santa Catarina (state)) Metropolitano	8	3	3	2	16	10	+6	12
(São Paulo (state)) Penapolense	8	3	3	2	11	6	+5	12
(Rio Grande do Sul) Pelotas	8	1	4	3	10	16	−6	7
(Rio de Janeiro (state)) Boavista	8	0	3	5	6	18	−12	3

== Round of 16 ==
Team 1	Agg.	Team 2	1st leg	2nd leg
Central	1–2	Confiança	0–1	1–1
Metropolitano	1–2	Tombense	1–1	0–1
Santos-AP	0–6	Londrina	0–1	0–5
Ituano	1–1 (1–3 p)	Moto Club	1–0	0–1
Anapolina	2–2 (13–12 p)	Rio Branco-AC	1–1	1–1
Remo	2–3	Brasiliense	1–2	1–1
CEOV	0–4	Brasil de Pelotas	0–0	0–4
Globo	3–3 (a)	Jacuipense	1–3	2–0

== Quarterfinals ==
Team 1	Agg.	Team 2	1st leg	2nd leg
Brasil de Pelotas	3–3 (4–3 p)	Brasiliense	2–1	1–2
Anapolina	0–2	Londrina	0–2	0–0
Jacuipense	0–2	Confiança	0–2	0–0
Moto Club	2–4	Tombense	2–2	0–2

== Semifinals ==
Team 1	Agg.	Team 2	1st leg	2nd leg
Brasil de Pelotas	5–3	Londrina	3–1	2–2
Tombense	2–1	Confiança	1–0	1–1

== Finals ==
Team 1	Agg.	Team 2	1st leg	2nd leg
Brasil de Pelotas	0–0 (2–4 p)	Tombense	0–0	0–0
