= 2009 Copa do Brasil =

Copa do Brasil 2009

Tournament details
- Country: Brazil
- Dates: March 14 - July 1
- Teams: 64

Final positions
- Champions: Corinthians (SP)
- Runners-up: Internacional (RS)

Tournament statistics
- Matches played: 115
- Goals scored: 315 (2.74 per match)
- Top goal scorer: Taison (7 goals)

The 2009 Copa do Brasil was the 21st edition of the Copa do Brasil. It began on February 18 and ended on July 1.

== Format ==
The tournament is played in six stages, with two teams playing a two-legged tie in each stage. In the first two rounds, if the away team wins the first match by at least a 2-goal difference, it will move towards next round. The away goals rule is also used in the Copa do Brasil. The winner will qualify to the 2010 Copa Libertadores, which prevents them from participating in next year's Copa do Brasil.

== Qualified teams ==
The 2009 edition was contested by 64 teams. 54 clubs qualified through their respective state championship or some other competition. The number of berth given to each state (one, two, or three) is determined through CBF's state ranking. Criteria may vary, but usually state federations indicate clubs with best records in the state championships or other special competitions organized by such institutions. The remaining ten clubs qualified through CBF's club ranking. Clubs that participated in the 2009 Copa Libertadores did not take part in the competition because of scheduling conflicts.

=== Qualified by state championships and other competitions ===
State	Team	City	Qualification criteria
São Paulo	Ponte Preta	Campinas	2008 State Championship runners-up
São Paulo	Guaratinguetá	Guaratinguetá	2008 State Championship 3rd place^{1}
São Paulo	Atlético Sorocaba	Sorocaba	2008 Copa Paulista de Futebol winners
Rio de Janeiro	Flamengo	Rio de Janeiro	2008 State Championship winners
Rio de Janeiro	Botafogo	Rio de Janeiro	2008 State Championship runners-up
Rio de Janeiro	Americano	Campos dos Goytacazes	2008 Copa Rio runners-up^{2}
Rio Grande do Sul	Internacional	Porto Alegre	2008 State Championship winners
Rio Grande do Sul	Juventude	Caxias do Sul	2008 State Championship runners-up
Rio Grande do Sul	Caxias	Caxias do Sul	2007 Copa FGF winners
Minas Gerais	Atlético Mineiro	Belo Horizonte	2008 State Championship runners-up
Minas Gerais	Tupi	Juiz de Fora	2008 State Championship 3rd place^{3}
Minas Gerais	América Mineiro	Belo Horizonte	Taça Minas Gerais runners-up^{4}
Paraná	Coritiba	Curitiba	2008 State Championship winners
Paraná	Atlético Paranaense	Curitiba	2008 State Championship runners-up
Paraná	J. Malucelli	Curitiba	2008 Copa Paraná winners
Pernambuco	Náutico	Recife	2008 State Championship runners-up
Pernambuco	Central	Caruaru	2008 State Championship 3rd place^{5}
Bahia	Vitória	Salvador	2008 State Championship winners
Bahia	Bahia	Salvador	2008 State Championship runners-up
Goiás	Itumbiara	Itumbiara	2008 State Championship winners
Goiás	Goiás	Goiânia	2008 State Championship runners-up
Santa Catarina	Figueirense	Florianópolis	2008 State Championship winners
Santa Catarina	Criciúma	Criciúma	2008 State Championship runners-up
Ceará	Fortaleza	Fortaleza	2008 State Championship winners
Ceará	Icasa	Juazeiro do Norte	2008 State Championship runners-up
Pará	Remo	Belém	2008 State Championship winners
Pará	Águia de Marabá	Marabá	2008 State Championship runners-up
Rio Grande do Norte	ABC	Natal	2008 State Championship winners
Rio Grande do Norte	Potiguar	Mossoró	2008 State Championship runners-up
Alagoas	CSA	Maceió	2008 State Championship winners
Alagoas	ASA	Arapiraca	2008 State Championship runners-up
Distrito Federal	Brasiliense	Brasília	2008 State Championship winners
Distrito Federal	Dom Pedro II	Brasília	2008 State Championship runners-up
Espírito Santo	Serra	Serra	2008 State Championship winners
Espírito Santo	Desportiva	Vitória	2008 Copa Espírito Santo winners
Maranhão	Moto Club	São Luís	2008 State Championship 1st stage winners
Maranhão	Sampaio Corrêa	São Luís	2008 State Championship 2nd stage winners
Paraíba	Campinense	Campina Grande	2008 State Championship winners
Paraíba	Nacional	Patos	2008 Copa Paraíba winners
Mato Grosso do Sul	Ivinhema	Ivinhema	State Championship winners
Mato Grosso do Sul	Misto	Três Lagoas	State Championship runners-up
Amazonas	Holanda	Rio Preto da Eva	2008 State Championship winners
Amazonas	Fast Clube	Manaus	2008 State Championship runners-up
Sergipe	Confiança	Aracaju	2008 State Championship winners
Sergipe	Itabaiana	Itabaiana	2008 Copa Governador João Alves runners-up^{6}
Piauí	Barras	Barras	2008 State Championship winners
Piauí	Flamengo	Teresina	2008 Copa Piauí winners
Mato Grosso	Mixto	Cuiabá	2008 State Championship winners
Mato Grosso	União	Rondonópolis	2008 State Championship runners-up
Acre	Rio Branco	Rio Branco	2008 State Championship winners
Rondônia	Vilhena	Vilhena	2009 State Championship runners-up^{7}
Tocantins	Tocantins	Palmas	2008 State Championship winners
Amapá	Cristal	Macapá	2008 State Championship winners
Roraima	Atlético Roraima	Boa Vista	2008 State Championship winners

^{1} 2008 State Championship winners Palmeiras qualified to 2009 Copa Libertadores
^{2} 2008 Copa Rio winners Nova Iguaçu withdrew.
^{3} 2008 State Championship winners Cruzeiro qualified to 2009 Copa Libertadores.
^{4} 2008 Taça Minas Gerais winners Tupi qualified via State Championship.
^{5} 2008 State Championship winners Sport qualified to 2009 Copa Libertadores.
^{6} 2008 Copa Governador João Alves winners Confiança already qualified via State Championship.
^{7} 2008 State Championship winners Ulbra Ji-Paraná is now defunct.

=== Qualified by CBF club ranking ===
Pos	Team	City	State	Points
2	Corinthians	São Paulo	São Paulo	1,938
3	Vasco	Rio de Janeiro	Rio de Janeiro	1,928
10	Santos	Santos	São Paulo	1,649
11	Fluminense	Rio de Janeiro	Rio de Janeiro	1,561
13	Guarani	Campinas	São Paulo	1,409
17	Portuguesa	São Paulo	São Paulo	1,284
21	Santa Cruz	Recife	Pernambuco	1,132
23	Paraná	Curitiba	Paraná	978
25	Ceará	Fortaleza	Ceará	936
30	América de Natal	Natal	Rio Grande do Norte	651

== Stages 1–4 ==
Teams that play in their home stadium in the first leg are marked with †.

=== Section 1 ===
First Round
(Piauí) Flamengo-PI †	1	-	1
(Rio de Janeiro (state)) Vasco da Gama	4	-	4
(Pernambuco) Central † (a)	0	1	1
Ceará	0	1	1
(Ceará) Icasa † (p)	1	1	2 (4)
(São Paulo (state)) Portuguesa	1	1	2 (3)
(Sergipe) Confiança †	3	0	3
(Rio Grande do Norte) América de Natal	2	0	2
(Sergipe) Itabaiana †	0	-	0
(Minas Gerais) Atlético Mineiro	5	-	5
(São Paulo (state)) Guaratinguetá †	2	1	3
(Rio Grande do Sul) Caxias	0	2	2
(Alagoas) ASA †	1	1	1 (4)
(Bahia) Vitória (p)	1	1	1 (5)
(São Paulo (state)) Atlético Sorocaba †	1	0	1
(Rio Grande do Sul) Juventude	0	2	2

Second Round
(Rio de Janeiro (state)) Vasco da Gama	3	-	3
(Pernambuco) Central †	0	-	0
(Ceará) Icasa †	0	2	2
(Sergipe) Confiança	0	1	1
(Minas Gerais) Atlético Mineiro	2	2	4
(São Paulo (state)) Guaratinguetá †	2	0	2
(Bahia) Vitória	2	1	3
(Rio Grande do Sul) Juventude †	1	1	2

Round of 16
(Rio de Janeiro (state)) Vasco da Gama †	1	4	5
(Ceará) Icasa	1	1	2
(Minas Gerais) Atlético Mineiro	0	3	3 (4)
(Bahia) Vitória † (p)	3	0	3 (5)

Quarterfinals
(Rio de Janeiro (state)) Vasco da Gama †	4	1	5
(Bahia) Vitória	0	1	1

=== Section 2 ===
First Round
(Goiás) Itumbiara †	0	-	0
(São Paulo (state)) Corinthians	2	-	2
(Mato Grosso do Sul) Misto † (p)	1	1	1 (3)
(Paraíba) Campinense	1	1	1 (2)
Tocantins †	0	-	0
(Paraná (state)) Atlético Paranaense	3	-	3
(Amazonas (Brazilian state)) Fast Clube †	1	0	1
(Rio Grande do Norte) ABC	1	4	5
(Paraíba) Nacional †	0	0	0
(Rio de Janeiro (state)) Fluminense	1	3	4
(Pará) Águia de Marabá †	2	1	3
(Minas Gerais) América Mineiro	1	0	1
Atlético Roraima †	1	-	1
Goiás	3	-	3
(Amapá) Cristal †	1	1	2
(Federal District (Brazil)) Brasiliense	2	3	5

Second Round
(São Paulo (state)) Corinthians	2	-	2
(Mato Grosso do Sul) Misto †	0	-	0
(Paraná (state)) Atlético Paranaense	2	3	5
(Rio Grande do Norte) ABC †	2	1	3
(Rio de Janeiro (state)) Fluminense	1	3	4
(Pará) Águia de Marabá †	2	0	2
Goiás	1	4	5
(Federal District (Brazil)) Brasiliense †	0	1	1

Round of 16
(São Paulo (state)) Corinthians	2	2	4
(Paraná (state)) Atlético Paranaense †	3	0	3
(Rio de Janeiro (state)) Fluminense (a)	2	1	3
Goiás †	2	1	3

Quarterfinals
(São Paulo (state)) Corinthians †	1	2	3
(Rio de Janeiro (state)) Fluminense	0	2	2

=== Section 3 ===
First Round
(Federal District (Brazil)) Dom Pedro II †	0	-	0
(Rio de Janeiro (state)) Botafogo	2	-	2
(Rio de Janeiro (state)) Americano †	2	4	6
(Pernambuco) Santa Cruz	0	2	2
(Rondônia) Vilhena †	1	1	2
(São Paulo (state)) Ponte Preta	2	6	8
(Maranhão) Sampaio Corrêa †	3	1	4
(Santa Catarina (state)) Figueirense (a)	2	2	4
(Acre (state)) Rio Branco †	1	0	1
(São Paulo (state)) Santos	2	4	6
(Espírito Santo) Serra †	2	1	3
(Alagoas) CSA	3	3	6
(Amazonas (Brazilian state)) Holanda †	1	0	1
(Paraná (state)) Coritiba	2	3	5
(Rio Grande do Norte) Potiguar †	2	1	3
Bahia	2	6	8

Second Round
(Rio de Janeiro (state)) Botafogo	1	2	3 (4)
(Rio de Janeiro (state)) Americano † (p)	2	1	3 (5)
(São Paulo (state)) Ponte Preta (a)	2	0	2
(Santa Catarina (state)) Figueirense †	2	0	2
(São Paulo (state)) Santos	0	0	0
(Alagoas) CSA †	0	1	1
(Paraná (state)) Coritiba (a)	2	0	4
Bahia †	2	0	4

Round of 16
(Rio de Janeiro (state)) Americano †	0	1	1
(São Paulo (state)) Ponte Preta	0	2	2
(Alagoas) CSA †	0	0	0
(Paraná (state)) Coritiba	4	3	7

Quarterfinals
(São Paulo (state)) Ponte Preta †	2	0	2
(Paraná (state)) Coritiba	2	1	3

=== Section 4 ===
First Round
(Mato Grosso do Sul) Ivinhema †	0	-	0
(Rio de Janeiro (state)) Flamengo	5	-	5
(Piauí) Barras †	0	0	0
(Pará) Remo	1	2	3
(Mato Grosso) Mixto †	1	2	3 (2)
(Paraná (state)) Paraná (p)	2	1	3 (4)
(Espírito Santo) Desportiva †	1	0	1
(Ceará) Fortaleza	1	3	4
(Mato Grosso) União †	1	0	1
(Rio Grande do Sul) Internacional	0	2	2
(Paraná (state)) J. Malucelli †	0	-	0
(São Paulo (state)) Guarani	2	-	2
(Maranhão) Moto Club †	1	0	1
(Pernambuco) Náutico	1	2	3
(Minas Gerais) Tupi †	2	0	2
(Santa Catarina (state)) Criciúma	0	3	3

Second Round
(Rio de Janeiro (state)) Flamengo	2	-	2
(Pará) Remo †	0	-	0
(Paraná (state)) Paraná	1	1	2
(Ceará) Fortaleza †	2	1	3
(Rio Grande do Sul) Internacional	2	5	7
(São Paulo (state)) Guarani †	1	0	1
(Pernambuco) Náutico	2	3	5
(Santa Catarina (state)) Criciúma †	2	2	4

Round of 16
(Rio de Janeiro (state)) Flamengo †	0	3	3
(Ceará) Fortaleza	0	0	0
(Rio Grande do Sul) Internacional	3	2	5
(Pernambuco) Náutico †	0	0	0

Quarterfinals
(Rio de Janeiro (state)) Flamengo †	0	1	1
(Rio Grande do Sul) Internacional	0	2	2

== Stages 5 and 6 ==
Teams that play in their home stadium in the first leg are marked with †.

Corinthians starting 11

Semifinals
1	(Rio de Janeiro (state)) Vasco da Gama †	1	0	1
4	(São Paulo (state)) Corinthians	1	0	1
3	(Paraná (state)) Coritiba	1	1	2
2	(Rio Grande do Sul) Internacional †	3	0	3

Final
(São Paulo (state)) Corinthians †	2	2	4
(Rio Grande do Sul) Internacional	0	2	2

Copa do Brasil
2009 Champion

Corinthians
3rd Title
