= Faissal Futebol Clube =

Brazilian football club

Faissal
- Full name: Faissal Futebol Clube
- Founded: January 20, 2001
- Dissolved: 2018
- Ground: Alziro de Almeida
- Capacity: 3,000
| Home colours | Away colours |

Faissal Futebol Clube, usually known simply as Faissal, was a Brazilian football team from the city of Itaboraí, Rio de Janeiro state, founded on January 20, 2001.

== Stadium ==
The home stadium Alziro de Almeida has a capacity of 3,000 people.

== Colors ==
The official colors are yellow and black.

== Club kits ==
The home kit is a yellow and black striped jersey, black shorts and white socks. The away kit is white, with details in yellow and black, and black socks.
