= Ponta Porã Sociedade Esportiva =

Ponta Porã
- Full name: Ponta Porã Sociedade Esportiva
- Nickname(s): Águia da fronteira
- Founded: 6 March 1998; 27 years ago
- Ground: Aral Moreira
- Capacity: 4,000
- 2011: Sul-Mato-Grossense, 15th of 16 (relegated)
Home colors	Away colors

Ponta Porã Sociedade Esportiva, commonly referred to as Ponta Porã, is a Brazilian football club based in Ponta Porã, Mato Grosso do Sul.

== History ==
The club was founded on 2 March 1998. Ponta Porã won the Campeonato Sul-Mato-Grossense Second Level in 2010.

== Achievements ==
- Campeonato Sul-Mato-Grossense Second Level:
  - Winners (1): 2010

== Stadium ==
Ponta Porã Sociedade Esportiva play their home games at Estádio Municipal Aral Moreira. The stadium has a maximum capacity of 6,000 people.
