= Operário Atlético Clube =

Operário AC
- Full name: Operário Atlético Caarapoense
- Nickname: Tigre do Vale
- Founded: 1 May 1952; 73 years ago
- Ground: Carecão
- Capacity: 2,144
- League: Campeonato Sul-Mato-Grossense Série B
- 2019: Sul-Mato-Grossense, 12th of 12
Home colours	Away colours

Operário Atlético Caarapoense, commonly known as Operário AC, is a Brazilian football club based in Caarapó, Mato Grosso do Sul. The club competes in the Campeonato Sul-Mato-Grossense Série B, the second division in the Mato Grosso do Sul state football league system.

== History ==
The club was founded on 3 May 1952, adopting similar logo, team kits and colors as Operário Futebol Clube. Until 2022, they were known as Operário Atlético Clube and were based in Dourados.

== Stadium ==
Operário Atlético Clube play their home games at Estádio Francisco Chaves Filho, nicknamed Chavinha, and located in Itaporã. The stadium has a maximum capacity of 2,144 people.

Until 2009, Operário Atlético Clube played their home games at Estádio Fredis Saldivar, nicknamed Douradão. The stadium had a maximum capacity of 30,000 people.

== Honours ==
- Campeonato Sul-Mato-Grossense Série B
  - Winners (2): 2017, 2022
