= Clube Atlético Paranaibense =

Football club in Paranaíba, Brazil

Paranaibense
- Full name: Clube Atlético Paranaibense
- Founded: 7 September 1986; 38 years ago
- Ground: Jaimão
- Capacity: 5,000
- 2007: Sul-Mato-Grossense, 9th of 11
Home colours	Away colours

Clube Atlético Paranaibense, commonly known as Paranaibense, is a Brazilian football team based in Paranaíba, Mato Grosso do Sul.

== History ==
The club was founded on 7 September 1986. They finished in the second position in the Campeonato Sul-Mato-Grossense Second Level in 2006, losing the competition to Corumbaense.

== Stadium ==
Clube Atlético Paranaibense play their home games at Estádio Jaime Queiroz Carvalho, nicknamed Jaimão. The stadium has a maximum capacity of 5,000 people.
