= Tio Sam Esporte Clube =

Tio Sam
- Full name: Tio Sam Esporte Clube
- Founded: October 8, 1997
- Ground: Estádio Gragoatá, Niterói, Rio de Janeiro state, Brazil
- Capacity: 3,000
Home colors	Away colors

Tio Sam Esporte Clube, commonly known as Tio Sam (Brazilian Portuguese: [ˈtʃiw ˈsɐ̃], Uncle Sam), is a Brazilian football and futsal club based in Niterói, Rio de Janeiro state. They finished as Taça Brasil de Futsal runners-up once.

== History ==
The club was founded on March 18, 1990.

=== Football ===
They won the Campeonato Carioca Fourth Level in 1995, and the Campeonato Carioca Third Level in 1996.

=== Futsal ===
Tio Sam won the Rio de Janeiro city editions of the Campeonato Carioca de Futsal in 1993, 1996, and the Rio de Janeiro state versions of the competition in 1993, 1994, 1995, 1996, 1997 and in 2004. Tio Sam finished as runner-up in the 1998 edition of the Taça Brasil de Futsal.

== Achievements ==
=== Football ===
- Campeonato Carioca Third Level:
  - Winners (1): 1996
- Campeonato Carioca Fourth Level:
  - Winners (1): 1995

=== Futsal ===
- Campeonato Carioca de Futsal:
  - Winners (8): 1993 (state), 1993 (city), 1996 (city), 1994 (state), 1995 (state), 1996 (state), 1997 (state), 2004 (state)

== Stadium ==
The Tio Sam Esporte Clube football team play their home games at Estádio Gragoatá. The stadium has a maximum capacity of 3,000 people.
