= Esporte Clube Corinthians de Bataguassu =

Football club in Mato Grosso do Sul, Brazil

Corinthians
- Full name: Esporte Clube Corinthians de Bataguassu
- Founded: June 14, 1991
- Dissolved: 2001
- Ground: Estádio Municipal de Bataguassu, Bataguassu, Mato Grosso do Sul state, Brazil
- Capacity: 5,000
Home colours	Away colours

Esporte Clube Corinthians de Bataguassu, commonly known as Corinthians, was a Brazilian football team based in Bataguassu, Mato Grosso do Sul state.

== History ==
The club was founded on June 14, 1991. Corinthians reached the semifinals in the 2000 Campeonato Sul-Mato-Grossense, when they were eliminated by Ubiratan. They folded in 2001.

== Stadium ==
Esporte Clube Corinthians de Bataguassu played their home games at Estádio Municipal de Bataguassu. The stadium has a maximum capacity of 5,000 people.
