= Nilópolis Futebol Clube =

Nilópolis
- Full name: Nilópolis Futebol Clube
- Founded: November 11, 1977
- Ground: Estádio José Alvarenga, Nilópolis, Rio de Janeiro state, Brazil
- Capacity: 2,500
Home colours	Away colours

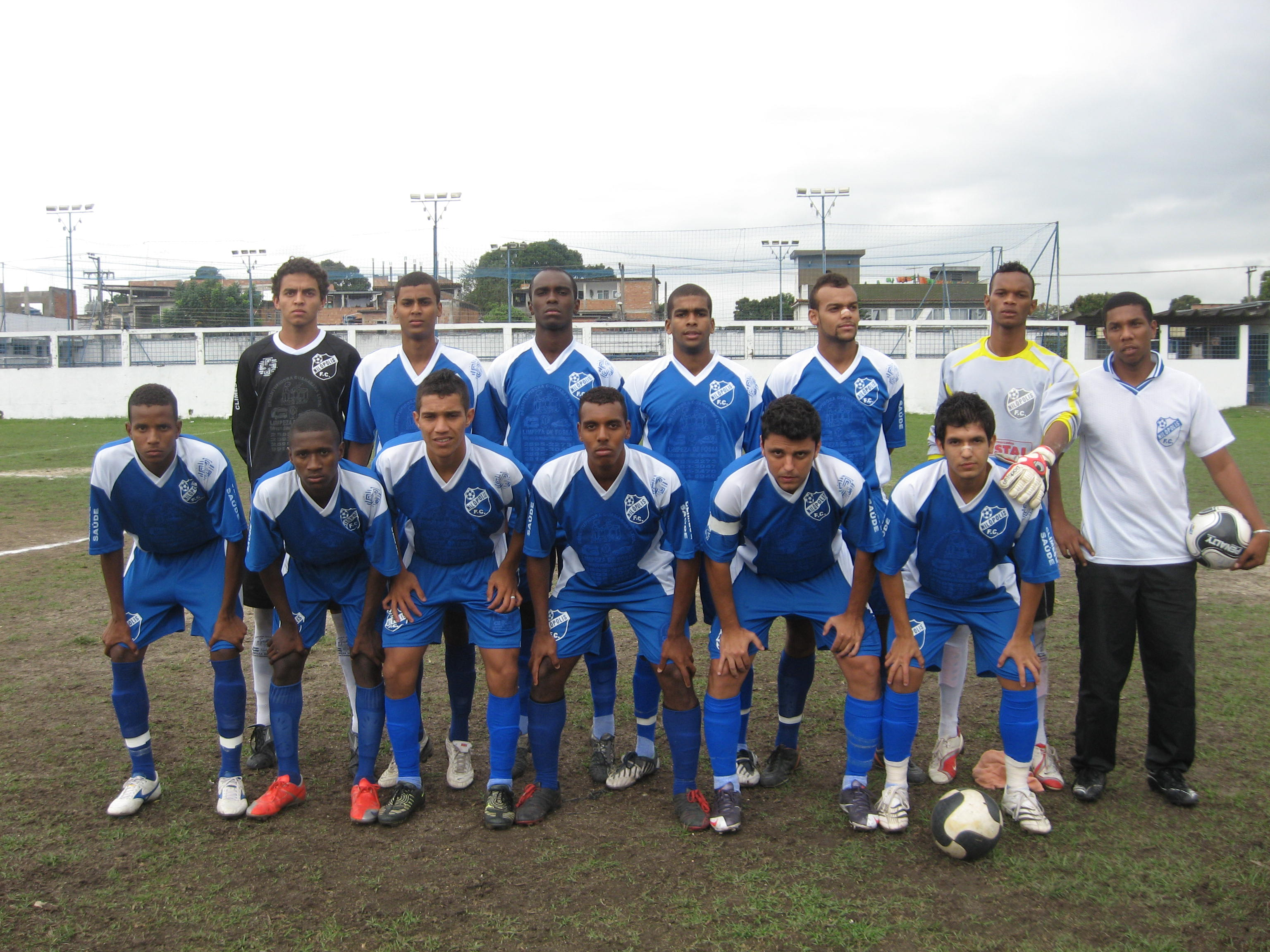
Team photo from the 2009 season

Nilópolis Futebol Clube, commonly known as Nilópolis, is a Brazilian football club based in Nilópolis, Rio de Janeiro state.

== History ==
The club was founded on November 11, 1977. Nilópois closed its football department in 1996, reopening it in 2004.

== Stadium ==
Nilópolis Futebol Clube play their home games at Estádio José Alvarenga. The stadium has a maximum capacity of 2,500 people.
