= Douradão =

Multi-use stadium in Dourados, Brazil

Coordinates: 22°14′39″S 54°46′55″W

- Interactive map of Douradão
- Full name: Estádio Fredis Saldívar
- Location: Dourados, Brazil
- Owner: Mato Grosso do Sul state government Dourados City Hall
- Capacity: 5,000
- Surface: Grass

Construction
- Built: 1986
- Opened: April 12, 1986

Tenants
- Clube Desportivo Sete de Setembro; Ubiratan Esporte Clube

Estádio Fredis Saldívar, commonly known as Douradão, is a multi-use stadium in Dourados, Brazil. It is currently used mostly for football matches. The stadium holds 5,000. It was built in 1986.

Douradão is owned by the Mato Grosso do Sul state government and by the Dourados City Hall. The stadium is named after Fredis Saldívar, who donated the ground plot where the stadium was built.

== History ==
In 1986, the works on Douradão were completed. The inaugural match was played on April 12 of that year, when Ubiratan beat Mixto 4–2. The first goal of the stadium was scored by Ubiratan's Ademir Patrício.

The stadium's attendance record currently stands at 18,780, set on July 17, 1988 when Ubiratan and Operário de Dourados drew 1-1.
