= Sociedade Esportiva e Cultural Terra e Mar Clube =

Terra e Mar
- Full name: Sociedade Esportiva e Cultural Terra e Mar Clube
- Nickname(s): Tricolor Praiano
- Founded: June 1, 1938
- Ground: Estádio Luiz Cesário, Fortaleza, Ceará state, Brazil
- Capacity: 3,500
| Home colors | Away colors |

Sociedade Esportiva e Cultural Terra e Mar Clube, commonly known as Terra e Mar, is a Brazilian football club based in Fortaleza, Ceará state.

== History ==
The club was founded on June 1, 1938. Terra e Mar was founded in Mucuripe neighborhood. The team won the Campeonato Cearense Third Level in 2009.

== Achievements ==
- Campeonato Cearense Third Level:
  - Winners (1): 2009

== Stadium ==
Sociedade Esportiva e Cultural Terra e Mar Clube play their home games at Estádio Luiz Cesário. The stadium has a maximum capacity of 3,500 people.
