= Princesa do Sul Futebol Clube =

Princesa do Sul
- Full name: Princesa do Sul Futebol Clube
- Founded: December 1, 2001 (23 years ago)
- Ground: Tiberão, Floriano, Piauí state, Brazil
- Capacity: 4,500
Home colors	Away colors

Princesa do Sul Futebol Clube, commonly known as Princesa do Sul, is a Brazilian football club based in Floriano, Piauí state.

== History ==
The club was founded on December 1, 2001.

== Stadium ==
Princesa do Sul Futebol Clube play their home games at Estádio Tibério Barbosa Nunes, nicknamed Tiberão. The stadium has a maximum capacity of 4,500 people.
