= Clube Atlético Cassilandense =

Cassilandense
- Full name: Clube Atlético Cassilandense
- Founded: 5 July 1986; 39 years ago
- Dissolved: 2008; 18 years ago
- Ground: Estádio Horácio Cesário
- Capacity: 5,000
- 1999: Sul-Mato-Grossense, 9th of 14
Home colours	Away colours

Clube Atlético Cassilandense, commonly known as Cassilandense, was a Brazilian football team based in Cassilândia, Mato Grosso do Sul state.

== History ==
The club was founded on 5 July 1986. Cassilandense finished in the second position in the Campeonato Sul-Mato-Grossense in 1995 and in 2001.

== Stadium ==
Clube Atlético Cassilandense played their home games at Estádio Horácio Cesário. The stadium had a maximum capacity of 5,000 people.
