= União de Marechal Hermes Futebol Clube =

União de Marechal
- Full name: União de Marechal Hermes Futebol Clube
- Founded: November 5, 1915
- Ground: Estádio Luso-Brasileiro, Rio de Janeiro, Rio de Janeiro state, Brazil
- Capacity: 5,994
Home colours	Away colours	colours

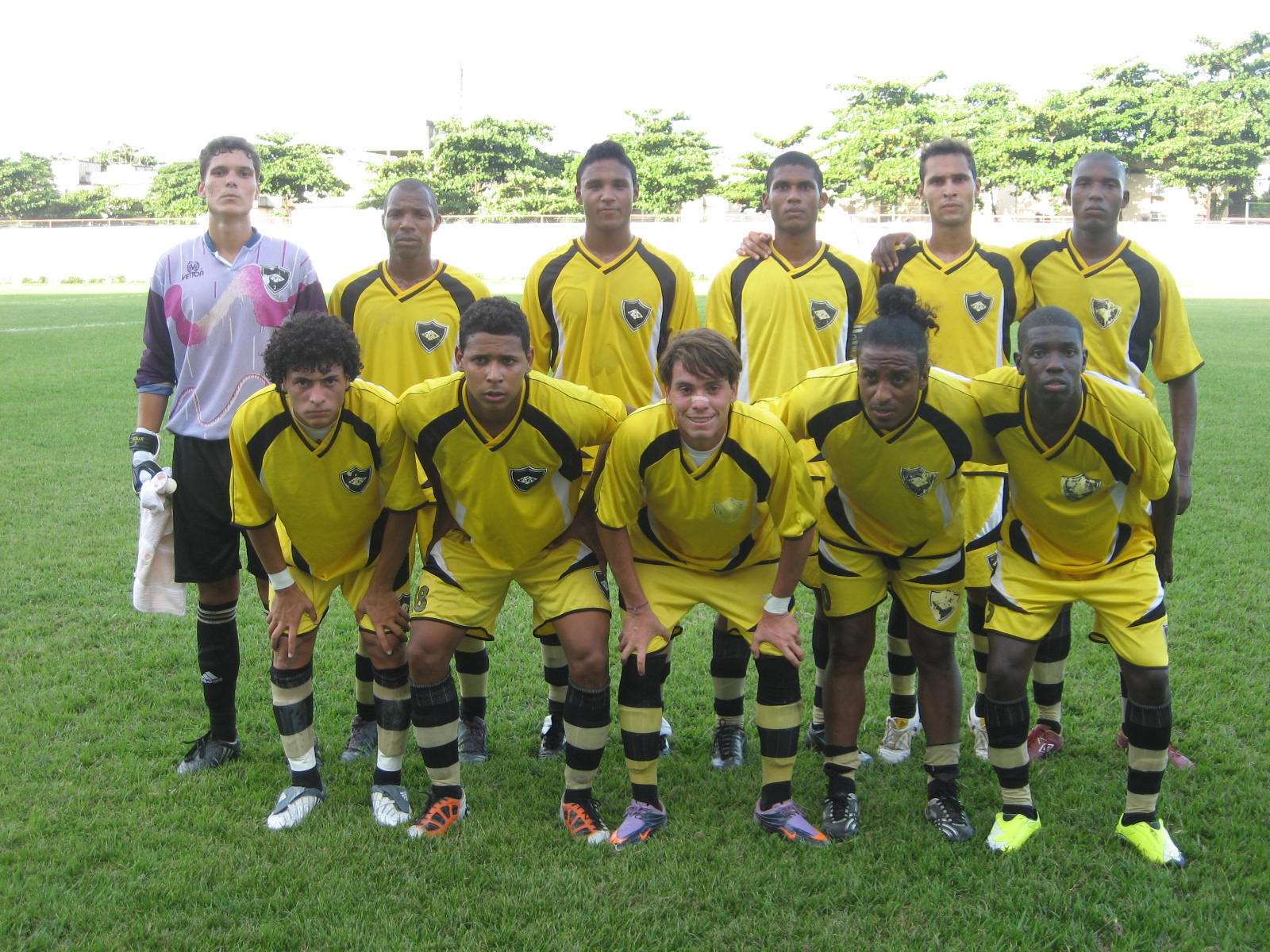
Team photo from the 2011 season

União de Marechal Hermes Futebol Clube, commonly known as União de Marechal Hermes, is a Brazilian football club based in Rio de Janeiro, Rio de Janeiro state. The club was formerly known as Sport Club União de Marechal Hermes.

== History ==
The club was founded on November 5, 1915, as Sport Club União de Marechal Hermes, being renamed to União de Marechal Hermes Futebol Clube on May 13, 2000. União is named after the neighborhood they are located in, Marechal Hermes.

== Stadium ==
União de Marechal Hermes Futebol Clube play their home games at Estádio Luso-Brasileiro. The stadium has a maximum capacity of 5,994 people.
