= Dourados Atlético Clube =

Brazilian association football club based in Dourados, Mato Grosso do Sul, Brazil

Dourados
- Full name: Dourados Atlético Clube
- Nickname: DAC
- Founded: 20 December 2020; 5 years ago
- Ground: Douradão
- Capacity: 5,000
- President: Marcos Araújo
- Head coach: Virgílio Ferreira
- League: Campeonato Sul-Mato-Grossense
- 2025: Sul-Mato-Grossense, 5th of 10
- Website: https://www.facebook.com/dacdourados/
Home colors	Away colors

Dourados Atlético Clube, commonly referred to as Dourados, is a Brazilian professional football club based in Dourados, Mato Grosso do Sul founded on 20 December 2020.

== Stadium ==
Dourados play their home games at Douradão. The stadium has a maximum capacity of 5,000 people.

== Honours ==
- Campeonato Sul-Mato-Grossense Série B

Winners (1): 2020
