= Clube Desportivo Sete de Setembro =

Brazilian football club

Sete de Dourados
- Full name: Clube Desportivo Sete de Setembro
- Nicknames: Tricolor; O Sete (The Seven)
- Founded: 7 September 1994; 31 years ago
- Ground: Douradão
- Capacity: 5,000
- President: Tony Montalvão
- 2019: Sul-Mato-Grossense, 3rd of 12
Home colors	Away colors

Clube Desportivo Sete de Setembro, or Sete de Dourados, as they are usually called, is a Brazilian football team from Dourados in Mato Grosso do Sul, founded on 7 September 1994.

Sete de Dourados is currently ranked sixth among Mato Grosso do Sul teams in CBF's national club ranking, at 216th place overall.

== History ==
The club was founded in 1994 but only made its first professional game in 2005, which was the year that the Sete de Dourados won the title of Campeonato Sul-Mato-Grossense Second Division.

In 2016, the club won in an unprecedented way the main division of Campeonato Sul-Mato-Grossense.

== Stadium ==
Sete de Dourados play their home games at Douradão. The stadium has a maximum capacity of 5,000 people.

== Honours ==
- Campeonato Sul-Mato-Grossense: 1

2016

- Campeonato Sul-Mato-Grossense Série B: 1

2005
