= Esporte Clube Taveirópolis =

Taveirópolis
- Full name: Esporte Clube Taveirópolis
- Nickname(s): Taveira
- Founded: July 30, 1938
- Ground: Estádio Elias Gadia, Campo Grande, Mato Grosso do Sul state, Brazil
- Capacity: 3,000
Home colours	Away colours

Esporte Clube Taveirópolis, commonly known as Taveirópolis, is Brazilian football club based in Campo Grande, Mato Grosso do Sul state. They competed in the Série C once.

== History ==
The club was founded on June 30, 1938, in Taveirópolis neighborhood. They competed in the Série C in 2003, when they were eliminated in the First Stage of the competition.

== Stadium ==
Esporte Clube Taveirópolis play their home games at Estádio Elias Gadia. The stadium has a maximum capacity of 3,000 people.
