= Sociedade Esportiva Nova Andradina =

Football club in Nova Andradina, Brazil

Nova Andradina
- Full name: Sociedade Esportiva Nova Andradina
- Nickname: SENA
- Founded: 19 May 1989; 36 years ago
- Dissolved: 2018; 7 years ago
- Ground: Mohamed Mustafá
- 2007: Sul-Mato-Grossense Série B, 16th of 16
Home colours	Away colours	colours

Sociedade Esportiva Nova Andradina was a football club from Nova Andradina, Mato Grosso do Sul, Brazil. They played in the Campeonato Sul-Matogrossense. Their colours were white and black.

== Honors ==
- Campeonato Sul-Matogrossense: 1
  - 1992
