= Sociedade Esportiva e Recreativa Chapadão =

Brazilian football club

Chapadão
- Full name: Sociedade Esportiva e Recreativa Chapadão
- Nickname(s): SERC; Tricolor
- Founded: 28 August 1981; 43 years ago
- Ground: SERC
- Capacity: 7,000
- League: Campeonato Sul-Mato-Grossense Série A
- 2022: Sul-Mato-Grossense, 5th of 10
Home colours	Away colours

The Sociedade Esportiva e Recreativa Chapadão, usually known as SERC, or simply as Chapadão, is a Brazilian football club based in Chapadão do Sul in the state of Mato Grosso do Sul. The club was established in 1981 and competed in the Campeonato Brasileiro Série C in 2003 and in 2004.

== Honours ==
=== State ===
- Campeonato Sul-Matogrossense
  - Winners (2): 1995, 2003
  - Runners-up (3): 1998, 2004, 2006
- Campeonato Sul-Mato-Grossense Série B
  - Winners (2): 2009, 2014

=== Women's Football ===
- Campeonato Sul-Mato-Grossense de Futebol Feminino
  - Winners (3): 2014, 2019, 2021
