= Esporte Clube Águia Negra =

Brazilian association football club based in Rio Brilhante, Mato Grosso do Sul

Águia Negra
- Full name: Esporte Clube Águia Negra
- Nickname: Águia (Eagle)
- Founded: 31 May 1972; 54 years ago
- Ground: Ninho da Águia
- Capacity: 1,500
- President: Iliê Vidal
- Head coach: Gelson Conte
- League: Campeonato Sul-Mato-Grossense Série B
- 2022: Sul-Mato-Grossense, 9th of 10 (relegated)
- Website: https://pt-br.facebook.com/aguianegrams/
Home colors	Away colors

Esporte Clube Águia Negra, usually known simply as Águia Negra or as Águia Negra de Rio Brilhante is a Brazilian football club from Rio Brilhante, Mato Grosso do Sul state.

As of 2022, Águia Negra is the top ranked team from Mato Grosso do Sul in CBF's national club ranking, being placed 95th overall.

== History ==
The club was founded on May 30, 1971.

In 2001, Águia Negra won its first title, which was the Mato Grosso do Sul State Championship Second Level, beating Coxim in the final.

In 2007, the club won its second title, which was the Mato Grosso do Sul State Championship. Águia Negra beat CENE in the final. In the same year, the club competed in the Brazilian Championship Third Level, but was eliminated in the second stage. They won the state championship again in 2012.

== Stadium ==
Águia Negra's stadium is Estádio Ninho da Águia, inaugurated in 2007, with a maximum capacity of 1,500 people.

== Current squad ==
Note: Flags indicate national team as defined under FIFA eligibility rules; some limited exceptions apply. Players may hold more than one non-FIFA nationality.

No.	Pos.	Nation	Player
—	GK	BRA	Augusto
—	GK	BRA	Cicero
—	DF	BRA	Gilson
—	DF	BRA	Tininho
—	DF	BRA	Adriano
—	DF	BRA	Diego
—	DF	BRA	Magno
—	DF	BRA	Renan
—	MF	BRA	Fábio Santos
—	MF	BRA	Gilberto

No.	Pos.	Nation	Player
—	MF	BRA	Wiliam
—	MF	BRA	Alex Franco
—	MF	BRA	Jhonatan
—	MF	BRA	Pericles
—	MF	BRA	Léo
—	MF	BRA	Nelmon
—	MF	BRA	Wellingthon
—	FW	BRA	Gefinho
—	FW	BRA	Murilo
—	FW	BRA	Tupanzinho

== Honours ==
- Campeonato Sul-Mato-Grossense
  - Winners (4): 2007, 2012, 2019, 2020
  - Runners-up (1): 2014
- Campeonato Sul-Mato-Grossense Série B
  - Winners (1): 2001
