= Novo Futebol Clube =

Football club in Campo Grande, Brazil

Novo
- Full name: Novo Futebol Clube
- Founded: 11 October 2010; 15 years ago
- Ground: Sotero Zarate
- Capacity: 1,200
- President: Basilio Amaral
- Head coach: Robert
- League: Campeonato Sul-Mato-Grossense Série B
- 2021: Sul-Mato-Grossense, 10th of 10 (relegated)
Home colors	Away colors

Novo Futebol Clube, commonly referred to as Novo, is a Brazilian football club based in Campo Grande, Mato Grosso do Sul. They competed in the Campeonato Sul-Mato-Grossense seven times.

Novo is currently ranked fifth among Mato Grosso do Sul teams in CBF's national club ranking, at 197th place overall.

== History ==
Novoperário Futebol Clube was founded on 11 October 2010 by former members of Operário Futebol Clube board of directors and ultra groups, and the new club was named after the club they left, Novoperário is a truncation of Novo Operário and means New Operário in Portuguese.

The club became a professional team in late 2011 to compete in the Campeonato Sul-Mato-Grossense Second Division. They won in the same day as the club's foundation its first professional title, which was the 2012 edition of that competition. Novoperário was eliminated by Naviraiense in the Quarterfinals of the 2013 Campeonato Sul-Matogrossense.

Ahead of the 2017 season, to avoid confusion with the supporters of Operário, the club changed name to Novo FC, but the move was made official only in 2020.

== Achievements ==
Novoperário Futebol Clube achievements
Achievement	No.	Years
Campeonato Sul-Mato-Grossense Série B	1	2012
