= Maracaju Atlético Clube =

Football club in Maracaju, Brazil

Maracaju
- Full name: Maracaju Atlético Clube
- Founded: 12 October 1986; 38 years ago
- Ground: Loucão
- Capacity: 6,000
- 2020: Sul-Mato-Grossense, 7th of 10
Home colors	Away colors

Maracaju Atlético Clube, commonly known as Maracaju, is a Brazilian football team based in Maracaju, Mato Grosso do Sul state.

== History ==
The club was founded on 12 October 1986. Maracaju won the Campeonato Sul-Mato-Grossense Second Level in 2004.

== Honours ==
- Campeonato Sul-Mato-Grossense Série B
  - Winners (1): 2004

== Stadium ==
Maracaju Atlético Clube play their home games at Estádio Luiz Gonzaga Braga, nicknamed Loucão. The stadium has a maximum capacity of 4,000 people.
