= Costa Rica Esporte Clube =

Brazilian association football club based in Costa Rica, Mato Grosso do Sul, Brazil

Costa Rica
- Full name: Costa Rica Esporte Clube
- Nicknames: CREC; Cobra do Norte (Northern Snake)
- Founded: 2 December 2004; 21 years ago
- Ground: Laertão
- Capacity: 3,000
- President: Melquior Luiz Battisti
- Head coach: Ito Roque
- League: Campeonato Sul-Mato-Grossense
- 2025: Sul-Mato-Grossense, 6th of 10
- Website: https://pt-br.facebook.com/costaricaesporteclube/
Home colors	Away colors

Costa Rica Esporte Clube, commonly referred to as Costa Rica, is a Brazilian professional football club based in Costa Rica, Mato Grosso do Sul founded on 2 December 2004.

== Stadium ==
Dourados play their home games at Laertão. The stadium has a maximum capacity of 3,000 people.

== Honours ==
- Campeonato Sul-Mato-Grossense
  - Winners (2): 2021, 2023
