= União Recreativo Social Olímpico =

URSO
- Full name: União Recreativo Social Olímpico
- Nickname: Tricolor do Conesul
- Founded: January 1, 1997
- Ground: Estádio Cacildo Cândido Pereira, Mundo Novo, Mato Grosso do Sul state, Brazil
- Capacity: 2,000
Home colors	Away colors

União Recreativo Social Olímpico, commonly known as URSO, is a Brazilian football team based in Mundo Novo, Mato Grosso do Sul state. The club was formerly known as Clube Atlético Mundo Novo,

== History ==
The club was founded on February 10, 2000, as União Recreativo Social Olímpico. The club was in 2010 renamed back to União Recreativo Social Olímpico, being known by the acronym URSO.

== Stadium ==
União Recreativo Social Olímpico play their home games at Estádio Municipal Cacildo Cândido Pereira, also known as Toca do Urso. The stadium has a maximum capacity of 2,000 people.
