= Misto Esporte Clube =

Football club in Três Lagoas, Brazil

Misto
- Full name: Misto Esporte Clube
- Nickname(s): Carcará da Fronteira
- Founded: 1 May 1987; 38 years ago
- Ground: Benedito Soares da Mota
- Capacity: 1,500
- 2017: Sul-Mato-Grossense Série B, 3rd of 3
Home colours	Away colours

Misto Esporte Clube, commonly known as Misto, is a Brazilian football team based in Três Lagoas, Mato Grosso do Sul state. They competed in the Copa do Brasil once.

== History ==
The club was founded on 1 May 1987. They competed in the Copa do Brasil in 2009, defeating Campinense in the First Round, but they were eliminated by Corinthians in the Second Round of the cup.

== Stadium ==
Misto Esporte Clube play their home games at Estádio Benedito Soares Mota, nicknamed Madrugadão. The stadium has a maximum capacity of 1,500 people.
