= Coxim Atlético Clube =

Brazilian football team

Coxim
- Full name: Coxim Atlético Clube
- Nickname(s): CAC; Jaús Furiosos
- Founded: 10 January 2002; 23 years ago
- Ground: André Borges
- Capacity: 900
- President: Márcio Pacífico
- Head Coach: Marcos Oliveira
- League: Campeonato Sul-Mato-Grossense Série A
- 2022: Sul-Mato-Grossense, 7th of 10
Home colours	Away colours

Coxim Atlético Clube, commonly known as Coxim, is a Brazilian football team based in Coxim, Mato Grosso do Sul state. They won the Campeonato Sul-Mato-Grossense once and competed in the Copa do Brasil once.

== History ==
The club was founded on January 20, 2002. Coxim won the Campeonato Sul-Mato-Grossense in 2006. They competed in the Copa do Brasil in 2007, when they were eliminated in the First Stage by Atlético Parananense.

== Achievements ==
- Campeonato Sul-Mato-Grossense:
  - Winners (1): 2006

== Stadium ==
Coxim Atlético Clube play their home games at Estádio André Borges. The stadium has a maximum capacity of 900 people.
