= Esporte Clube Comercial (MS) =

Comercial-MS
- Full name: Esporte Clube Comercial
- Nickname: Colorado
- Founded: 15 March 1943; 83 years ago
- Ground: Moreninhas
- Capacity: 3,500
- President: Marlon Brandt
- Head Coach: Vacant
- League: Campeonato Sul-Mato-Grossense Série B
- 2025: Sul-Mato-Grossense Série B, 4th of 6
Home colours	Away colours

Esporte Clube Comercial, usually known simply as Comercial, is a traditional Brazilian football club from Campo Grande, Mato Grosso do Sul state. The club competed several times in the Campeonato Brasileiro Série A.

Comercial is currently ranked seventh among Mato Grosso do Sul teams in CBF's national club ranking, at 222nd place overall.

== History ==
On March 15, 1943, Esporte Clube Comercial was founded by Etheócles Ferreira and other Colégio Dom Bosco (Dom Bosco School) students, who were sons of rich farmers and tradesmen. In 1948, Jamil Naglis was elected as the club's president. He changed the club's colors to the current ones. On September 12, 1967, in Campo Grande city, Comercial beat the powerful Santos of Pelé, Agustín Cejas, Clodoaldo and Carlos Alberto 1–0. The winning goal was scored by Gil.

In 1973, Comercial competed in the Campeonato Brasileiro Série A for the first time. The club finished in the 26th place, ahead of Atlético Paranaense. In 1975, EC Comercial won its only Campeonato Matogrossense title. In 1979, Comercial competed in the Campeonato Sul-Matogrossense state championship first edition. The club was defeated by Operário in the final.

In 1982, EC Comercial won its first Campeonato Sul-Matogrossense. In 1986, the club competed in the Campeonato Brasileiro Série A for the last time. The club finished in the 35th position. In 1994, Comercial competed in the Copa do Brasil for the first time. In the first round, the club eliminated Paysandu, in the second round, the club eliminated Kaburé of Tocantins state, and in the quarter-finals, Comercial was eliminated by Linhares of Espírito Santo state.

In 2002, Comercial reached Copa Centro-Oeste semifinals. The club was eliminated by Gama.

== Honours ==
=== Official tournaments ===
State
Competitions	Titles	Seasons
Campeonato Sul-Mato-Grossense	9	1982, 1985, 1987, 1993, 1994, 2000, 2001, 2010, 2015
Campeonato Mato-Grossense	1	1975

=== Others tournaments ===
==== State ====
- Torneio Incentivo (1): 1976
- Seletiva para Campeonato Brasileiro (1): 1972

==== City ====
- Liga Municipal de Campo Grande (9): 1948, 1951, 1956, 1957, 1959, 1964, 1965, 1967, 1971

=== Runners-up ===
- Campeonato Sul-Mato-Grossense (10): 1979, 1980, 1981, 1983, 1986, 1996, 1997, 1999, 2002, 2016
- Campeonato Mato-Grossense (3): 1970, 1972, 1977
- Campeonato Sul-Mato-Grossense Série B (1): 2007

=== Women's Football ===
- Campeonato Sul-Mato-Grossense de Futebol Feminino (5): 2010, 2011, 2013, 2015, 2017

== Stadium ==
Club play their home games at Estádio Jacques da Luz that seats 3,500 people.

Previously Esporte Clube Comercial's home stadium was Estádio Universitário Pedro Pedrossian, usually known as Morenão, inaugurated in 1977, with a maximum capacity of 45,000 people. The club also owns a training ground, called CT Vila Olímpica.

== Rival ==
Comercial's greatest rival is Operário. The derby between the clubs is known as Comerário, which is a portmanteau of the clubs names, Comercial and Operário. The traditional derby is over 50 years old. Comercial, alongside Operário, is one of the two Brazilian clubs which won two different state championships. Both clubs won the Campeonato Sul-Mato-Grossense and the Campeonato Mato-Grossense.

== Club colors ==
At the time of the club's foundation, its colors were red, green and black.

In 1948, the club's president, Jamil Naglis, changed the colors to its current ones, red and white.

== Nickname ==
Esporte Clube Comercial's nickname is Colorado, which is a reference to the club's colors, and meaning The Red. The club is also known as Saci, or Saci da Vila, after the Brazilian mythological creature.

== Mascot ==
Comercial's mascot is a Maned Wolf.

== Club name ==
The club's name, Comercial, is the Portuguese language word for commercial.
