= Itaporã Futebol Clube =

Itaporã
- Full name: Itaporã Futebol Clube
- Founded: 5 March 2008; 17 years ago
- Ground: Chavinha
- Capacity: 600
- President: Tony Montalvão
Home colours	Away colours

Itaporã Futebol Clube, commonly known as Itaporã, is a Brazilian football team based in Itaporã, Mato Grosso do Sul.

== History ==
The club was founded on March 5, 2008. Itaporã won the Campeonato Sul-Mato-Grossense Série C in 2008, being promoted in the same season to the Campeonato Sul-Mato-Grossense Série B, winning that competition as well.

== Achievements ==
- Campeonato Sul-Mato-Grossense Série B:
  - Winners (2): 2008, 2015
- Campeonato Sul-Mato-Grossense Série C:
  - Winners (1): 2008

== Stadium ==
Itaporã Futebol Clube play their home games at Estádio Francisco Chaves Filho, nicknamed Chavinha. The stadium has a maximum capacity of 600 people.
