= Aquidauana =

- Municipality
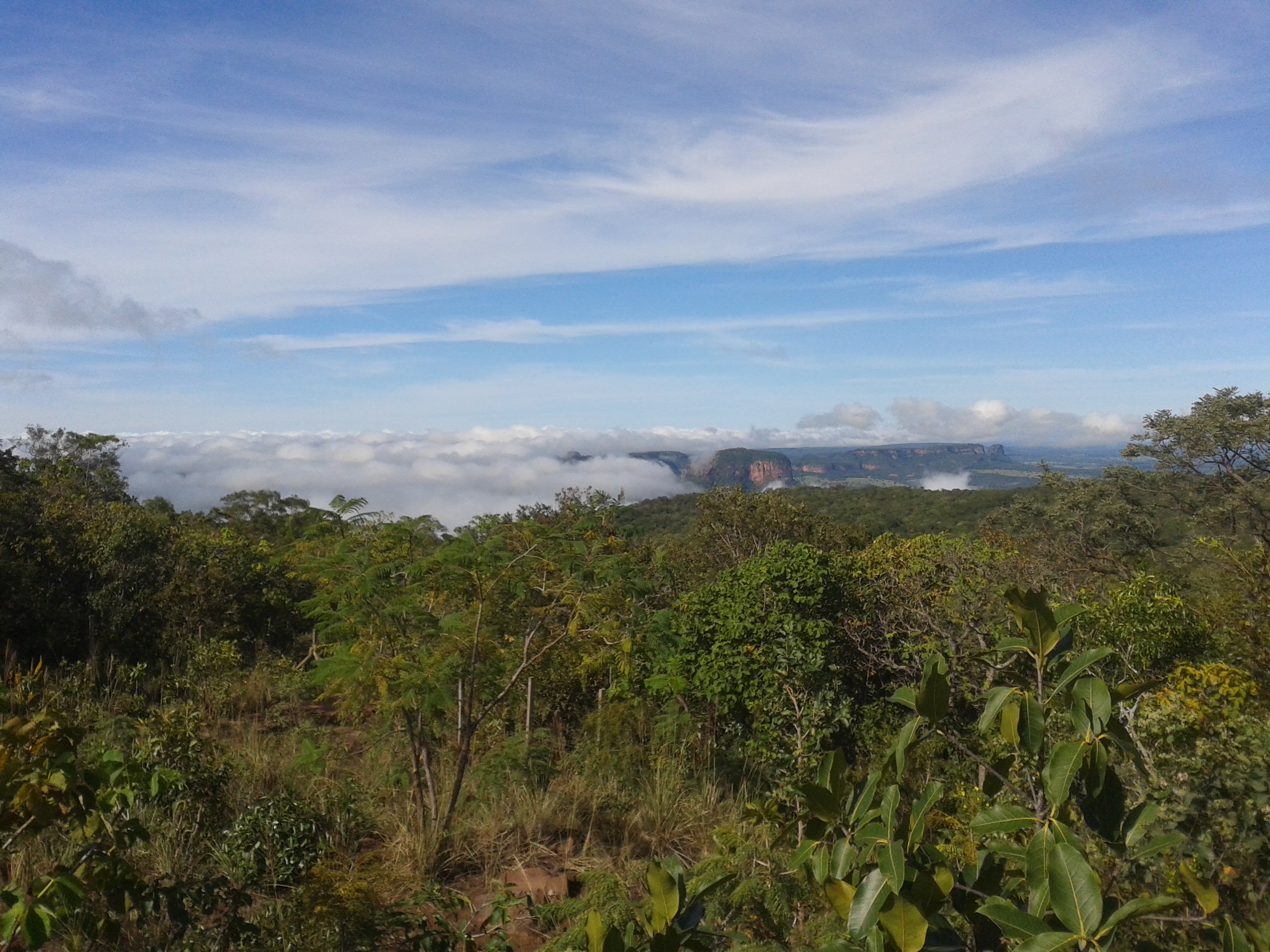

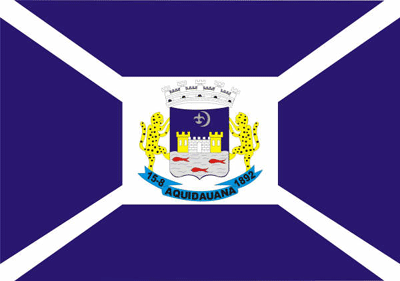
- Flag

- Location in Brazil
- Coordinates: 20°28′15″S 55°47′13″W
- Country: Brazil
- State: Mato Grosso do Sul
- Region: Center-West

Government
  - Mayor: Fauzi Suleiman

Area
  - Total: 16,958 km^{2} (6,548 sq mi)
- Elevation: 149 m (489 ft)

Population (2025)
  - Total: 48,689
  - Density: 2.8712/km^{2} (7.4363/sq mi)
- Demonym: Aquidauanses
- Time zone: UTC−4 (AMT)
- Area code: +55 67
- Website: Official website

Aquidauana is a municipality located in the Brazilian state of Mato Grosso do Sul. It takes its name from the river with which the name is shared.

The first European settlers were imperial soldiers who arrived during the Paraguayan War and were then settled on the lands they had occupied, between the Rivers Aquidauana and Negro, after the cessation of hostilities.

Aquidauana was founded on 15 August 1892 by a local committee including several leading colonels and farmers. The first teacher at the city's first school, opened in 1894, was a man called Teodoro Rondon. Aquidauana gained municipal status in 1918.

Aquidauanense Futebol Clube is the municipality association football club.
