= Clube Esportivo Naviraiense =

Football club in Naviraí, Brazil

Naviraiense
- Full name: Clube Esportivo Naviraiense
- Nickname(s): Jacaré do Cone Sul (Southern Cone's caiman)
- Founded: 25 November 2005; 19 years ago
- Ground: Virotão
- Capacity: 2,717
- President: Ronaldo Silva Botelho
- League: Campeonato Sul-Mato-Grossense Série A
- 2022: Sul-Mato-Grossense, 2nd of 10
Home colours	Away colours

Clube Esportivo Naviraiense, also known as Naviraiense, are a Brazilian football team from Naviraí, Mato Grosso do Sul. They competed in the Série D in 2009.

== History ==
Clube Esportivo Naviraiense were founded on 25 November 2005. They won the Campeonato Sul-Matogrossense Série B in 2007, and the Campeonato Sul-Matogrossense in 2009, when they beat Ivinhema in the final. Naviraiense competed in the Série D in 2009 when they were eliminated in the first stage of the competition.

In 2010, they played in the Brazil Cup. They faced Santos in the first phase. In the first game, at home, they lost by 1-0, forcing a second game in Vila Belmiro. However, back in the game, Santos won the game by 10-0, with 6-0 in the first half.

== Stadium ==
Naviraiense play their home games at Virotão. The stadium has a maximum capacity of 2,717 people.

== Honours ==
- Campeonato Sul-Mato-Grossense
  - Winners (1): 2009
- Campeonato Sul-Mato-Grossense Série B
  - Winners (3): 2007, 2021, 2024
