= Itaporã =

- Municipality
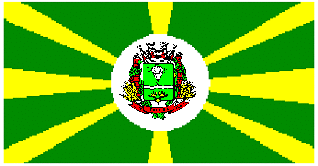
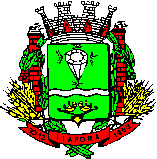
- Flag Coat of arms

- Location in Mato Grosso do Sul state

- Location in Brazil
- Coordinates: 22°04′44″S 54°47′20″W
- Country: Brazil
- Region: Central-West
- State: Mato Grosso do Sul

Area
  - Total: 1,322 km^{2} (510 sq mi)

Population (2020)
  - Total: 25,162
  - Density: 19.03/km^{2} (49.30/sq mi)
- Time zone: UTC−4 (AMT)

Itaporã is a municipality located in the Brazilian state of Mato Grosso do Sul. Its population was 25,162 in 2020 and its area is 1,322 square kilometres (510 sq mi).
