= Aquidauanense Futebol Clube =

Aquidauanense
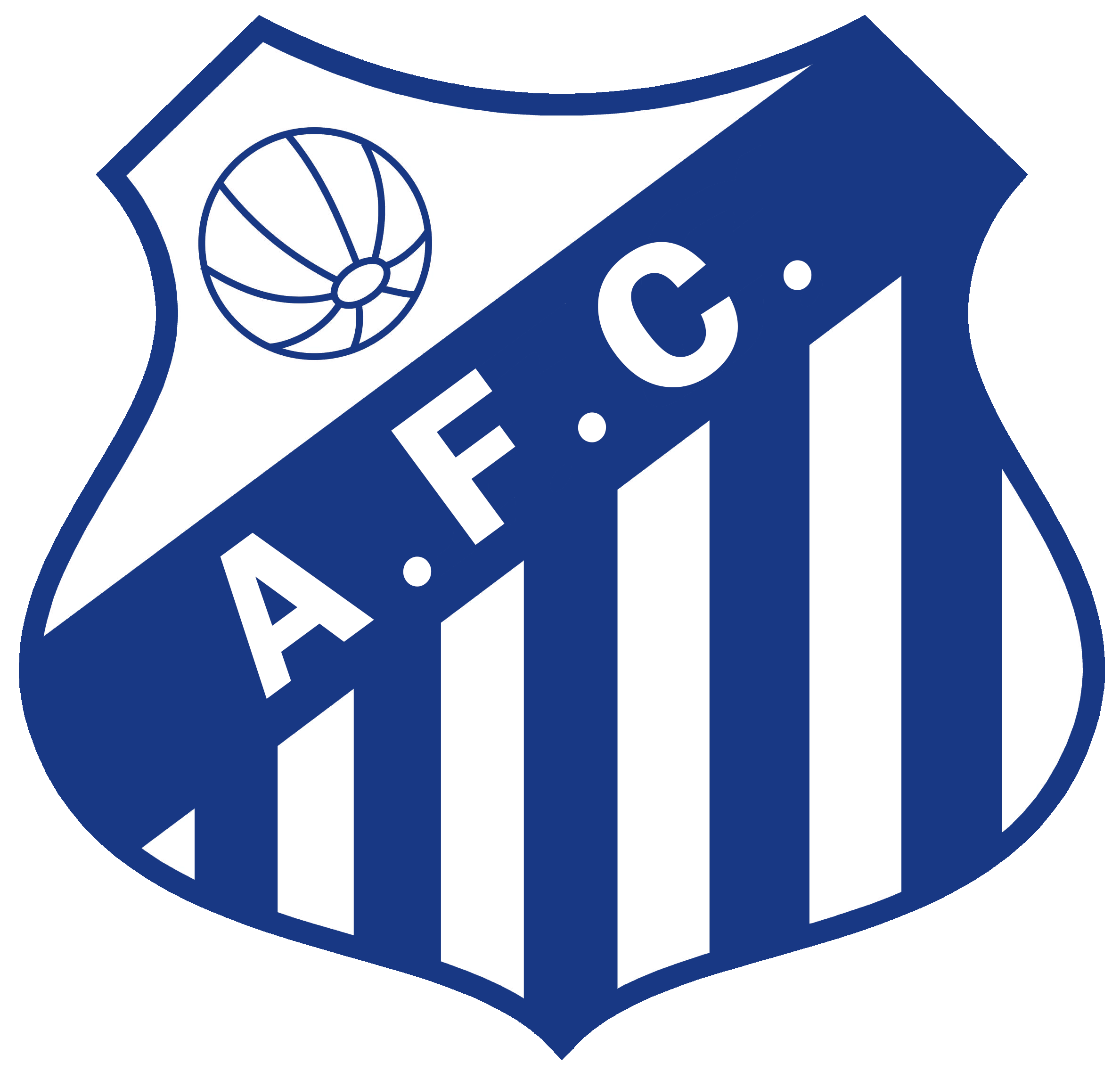
- Full name: Aquidauanense Futebol Clube
- Nickname: Azulão da Princesa (Big Blue Princess)
- Founded: 10 December 2001; 24 years ago
- Ground: Noroeste
- Capacity: 2,597
- League: Campeonato Sul-Mato-Grossense Série B
- 2025: Sul-Mato-Grossense, 10th of 10 (relegated)
Home colours	Away colours	Third colours

Aquidauanense Futebol Clube, commonly known as Aquidauanense, is a Brazilian football team based in Aquidauana, Mato Grosso do Sul state. The club was formerly known as Escolinha de Futebol Aquidauanense.

Aquidauanense is currently ranked fourth among Mato Grosso do Sul teams in CBF's national club ranking, at 195th place overall.

== History ==
The club was founded on 10 December 2001, as Escolinha de Futebol Aquidauanense, eventually being renamed to Aquidauanense Futebol Clube. Despite finishing in the 10th position in the Campeonato Sul-Mato-Grossense Second Level in 2007, the club was promoted to the 2008 Campeonato Sul-Mato-Grossense. In 2011, the club was runner-up in the Campeonato Sul-Mato-Grossense, losing the final to the Clube Esportivo Nova Esperança.

== Stadium ==
Aquidauanense Futebol Clube play their home games at Estádio Municipal de Aquidauana, nicknamed Estádio da Noroeste. The stadium has a maximum capacity of 2,597 people.

== Honours ==
- Campeonato Sul-Mato-Grossense Série B
  - Winners (2): 2018, 2026
