= Caarapó =

- Municipality
- Flag Coat of arms

- Location in Mato Grosso do Sul state

- Location in Brazil
- Coordinates: 22°38′02″S 54°49′19″W
- Country: Brazil
- Region: Central-West
- State: Mato Grosso do Sul

Area
  - Total: 2,090 km^{2} (810 sq mi)

Population (2020)
  - Total: 30,593
  - Density: 14.6/km^{2} (37.9/sq mi)
- Time zone: UTC−4 (AMT)

Caarapó is a municipality located in the Brazilian state of Mato Grosso do Sul. Its population was 30,593 (2020) and its area is 2,090 km^{2} (810 sq mi).
