= Operário Futebol Clube (MS) =

Brazilian association football club based in Campo Grande, Mato Grosso do Sul, Brazil

Operário
- Full name: Operário Futebol Clube
- Nickname: Galo (Rooster)
- Founded: 21 August 1938; 88 years ago
- Ground: Moreninhas
- Capacity: 3,500
- President: Estevão Petrallás
- Head coach: Celso Rodrigues
- League: Campeonato Brasileiro Série D Campeonato Sul-Mato-Grossense
- 2025 2025: Série D, 51st of 64; Sul-Mato-Grossense, 1st of 10 (champions)
- Website: operario.com.br
Home colors	Away colors

Operário Futebol Clube, commonly referred to as Operário de Campo Grande, Operário-MS or simply Operário is a Brazilian professional club based in Campo Grande, Mato Grosso do Sul founded on 21 August 1938. It competes in the Campeonato Sul-Mato-Grossense, the top flight of the Mato Grosso do Sul state football league, and the Campeonato Brasileiro Série D.

Operário is currently ranked third among Mato Grosso do Sul teams in CBF's national club ranking, at 179th place overall.

== History ==
The club was founded on August 28, 1938, by civil construction workers of Campo Grande. The name Operário means Factory Worker in Portuguese.

Since November 29, 1999, Operário is an enterprise. Because of this, the team name changed from Operário Futebol Clube to Operário Futebol Clube S/A. S/A means joint-stock company.

Currently Operário is in a very serious financial crisis and most of its debts are labor debts and tax debts.

== Stadium ==
Club play their home games at Estádio Jacques da Luz that seats 3,500 people.

Previous home stadium was the Morenão, capacity 29,670

== Rivalries ==
Operário's biggest rival is Comercial, with whom he plays the Clássico Comerário (Comerário derby), the biggest of the Mato Grosso do Sul state and one of the largest in the central-west region of Brazil.

== Honours ==
=== Official tournaments ===
National
Competitions	Titles	Seasons
Campeonato Brasileiro Série B	1	1987
State
Competitions	Titles	Seasons
Campeonato Sul-Mato-Grossense	15	1979, 1980, 1981, 1983, 1986, 1988, 1989, 1991, 1996, 1997, 2018, 2022, 2024, 2025, 2026
Campeonato Mato-Grossense	4	1974, 1976, 1977, 1978
Copa Imprensa	1	2007
City
Competitions	Titles	Seasons
Copa Campo Grande	1	2007

- record

=== Runners-up ===
- Campeonato Sul-Mato-Grossense (7): 1982, 1985, 1987, 1992, 1993, 2005, 2023
- Campeonato Sul-Mato-Grossense Série B (1): 2015

=== Women's Football ===
- Campeonato Sul-Mato-Grossense de Futebol Feminino (4): 2021, 2022, 2023, 2024
