= Chapadão do Sul =

- Municipality
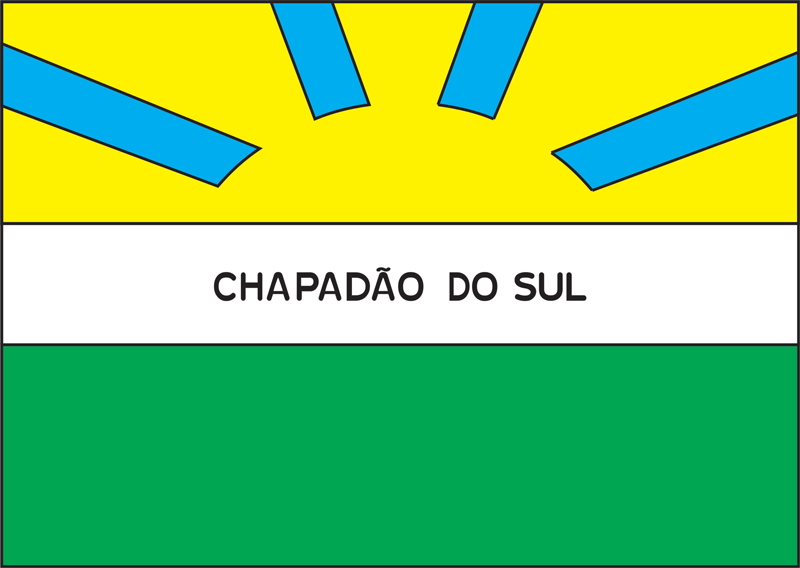
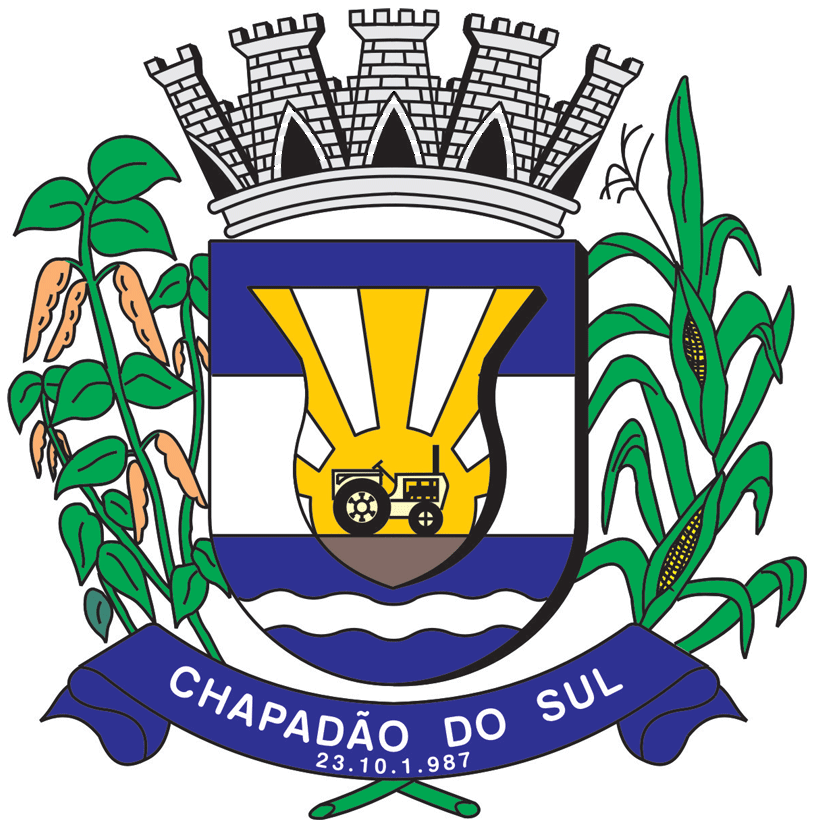
- Flag Coat of arms

- Location in Mato Grosso do Sul state

- Location in Brazil
- Coordinates: 18°47′38″S 52°37′22″W
- Country: Brazil
- Region: Central-West
- State: Mato Grosso do Sul

Area
  - Total: 3,851 km^{2} (1,487 sq mi)

Population (2020)
  - Total: 25,865
  - Density: 6.716/km^{2} (17.40/sq mi)
- Time zone: UTC−4 (AMT)

Chapadão do Sul is a municipality located in the Brazilian state of Mato Grosso do Sul. Its population was 25,865 (2020) and its area is 3,851 km^{2}.
