= Corumbaense Futebol Clube =

Brazilian football club

Corumbaense
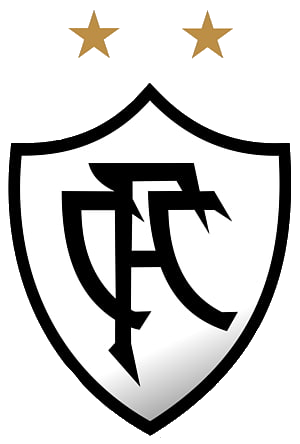
- Full name: Corumbaense Futebol Clube
- Nickname: Carijó da Avenida
- Founded: 1 January 1914; 112 years ago
- Ground: Arthur Marinho
- Capacity: 2,400
Home colours	Away colours

The Corumbaense Futebol Clube, usually known simply as Corumbaense, is a Brazilian football club based in Corumbá in the state of Mato Grosso do Sul. Established in 1914. The club competed in the Campeonato Brasileiro Série A in 1985.

As of 2022, Corumbaense is the second-best ranked team from Mato Grosso do Sul in CBF's national club ranking, being placed 137th overall.

== Honours ==
- Campeonato Sul-Matogrossense
  - Winners (2): 1984, 2017
  - Runners-up (1): 2018
- Campeonato Sul-Matogrossense Série B
  - Winners (1): 2006
