= Ivinhema Futebol Clube =

Ivinhema
- Full name: Ivinhema Futebol Clube
- Nickname: Azulão do Vale
- Founded: 1 January 2006; 20 years ago
- Ground: Saraivão
- Capacity: 4,600
- President: João Carlos Rodrigues
- Head Coach: Douglas
- League: Campeonato Brasileiro Série D Campeonato Sul-Mato-Grossense
- 2025: Sul-Mato-Grossense, 2nd of 10
Home colours	Away colours

Ivinhema Futebol Clube, commonly known as Ivinhema, is a Brazilian football team based in Ivinhema, Mato Grosso do Sul. They won the Campeonato Sul-Mato-Grossense once and competed in the Copa do Brasil twice.

== History ==
The club was founded on January 1, 2006. Ivinhema won the Campeonato Sul-Mato-Grossense in 2008. They competed in the Copa do Brasil in 2009, when they were eliminated in the First Stage by Flamengo, and in 2010, when they were eliminated in the First Stage by Náutico.

== Honours ==
- Campeonato Sul-Mato-Grossense
  - Winners (1): 2008
  - Runners-up (1): 2025

== Stadium ==
Ivinhema Futebol Clube play their home games at Estádio Luís Saraiva Vieira, nicknamed Saraivão. The stadium has a maximum capacity of 4,600 people.
