= Campeonato Sul-Mato-Grossense =

Football league in Mato Grosso do Sul, Brazil

- Organising body: FFMS
- Founded: 1979; 47 years ago
- Country: Brazil
- State: Mato Grosso do Sul
- Level on pyramid: 1
- Relegation to: Campeonato Sul-Mato-Grossense Série B
- Domestic cup: Copa do Brasil
- Current champions: Operário (15th title) (2026)
- Most championships: Operário (15 titles)
- Website: FFMS Official website

The Campeonato Sul-Mato-Grossense is the top-flight professional state football league in the Brazilian state of Mato Grosso do Sul. It is run by the Mato Grosso do Sul Football Federation (FFMS).

== List of champions ==
Season	Champions	Runners-up
1979	Operário (1)	Comercial
1980	Operário (2)	Comercial
1981	Operário (3)	Comercial
1982	Comercial (1)	Operário
1983	Operário (4)	Comercial
1984	Corumbaense (1)	Douradense
1985	Comercial (2)	Operário
1986	Operário (5)	Comercial
1987	Comercial (3)	Operário
1988	Operário (6)	Ubiratan
1989	Operário (7)	Douradense
1990	Ubiratan (1)	SE Naviraiense
1991	Operário (8)	SE Naviraiense
1992	Nova Andradina (1)	Operário
1993	Comercial (4)	Operário
1994	Comercial (5)	Pontaporanense
1995	Chapadão (1)	Cassilandense
1996	Operário (9)	Comercial
1997	Operário (10)	Comercial
1998	Ubiratan (2)	Chapadão
1999	Ubiratan (3)	Comercial
2000	Comercial (6)	Ubiratan
2001	Comercial (7)	Cassilandense
2002	CENE (1)	Comercial
2003	Chapadão (2)	CENE
2004	CENE (2)	Chapadão
2005	CENE (3)	Operário
2006	Coxim (1)	Chapadão
2007	Águia Negra (1)	CENE
2008	Ivinhema (1)	Misto
2009	Naviraiense (1)	Ivinhema
2010	Comercial (8)	Naviraiense
2011	CENE (4)	Aquidauanense
2012	Águia Negra (2)	Naviraiense
2013	CENE (5)	Naviraiense
2014	CENE (6)	Águia Negra
2015	Comercial (9)	Ivinhema
2016	Sete de Setembro (1)	Comercial
2017	Corumbaense (2)	Novoperário
2018	Operário (11)	Corumbaense
2019	Águia Negra (3)	Aquidauanense
2020	Águia Negra (4)	Aquidauanense
2021	Costa Rica (1)	Dourados
2022	Operário (12)	Naviraiense
2023	Costa Rica (2)	Operário
2024	Operário (13)	Dourados
2025	Operário (14)	Ivinhema
2026	Operário (15)	Bataguassu

=== Titles by team ===
Teams in bold stills active.

Rank	Club	Winners	Winning years
1	**Operário**	15	1979, 1980, 1981, 1983, 1986, 1988, 1989, 1991, 1996, 1997, 2018, 2022, 2024, 2025, 2026
2	**Comercial**	9	1982, 1985, 1987, 1993, 1994, 2000, 2001, 2010, 2015
3	CENE	6	2002, 2004, 2005, 2011, 2013, 2014
4	**Águia Negra**	4	2007, 2012, 2019, 2020
5	Ubiratan	3	1990, 1998, 1999
6	**Chapadão**	2	1995, 2003
6	**Corumbaense**	2	1984, 2017
6	**Costa Rica**	2	2021, 2023
9	**Coxim**	1	2006
9	**Ivinhema**	1	2008
9	**Naviraiense**	1	2009
9	Nova Andradina	1	1992
9	Sete de Setembro	1	2016

=== By city ===
City	Championships	Clubs
Campo Grande	30	Operário (15), Comercial (9), CENE (6)
Dourados	4	Ubiratan (3), Sete de Setembro (1)
Rio Brilhante	4	Águia Negra (4)
Chapadão do Sul	2	Chapadão (2)
Corumbá	2	Corumbaense (2)
Costa Rica	2	Costa Rica (2)
Coxim	1	Coxim (1)
Ivinhema	1	Ivinhema (1)
Naviraí	1	Naviraiense (1)
Nova Andradina	1	Nova Andradina (1)

== Participation ==
=== Most appearances ===
As of 2023 season

Below is the list of clubs that have more appearances in the Campeonato Sul-Mato-Grossense.

Club	App	First	Last
Comercial	41	1979	2023
Operário	39	1979	2023
Taveirópolis	25	1979	2004
Corumbaense	24	1980	2020
Chapadão	23	1991	2023
Águia Negra	21	2002	2022
Maracaju	18	1992	2020
CENE	16	2000	2015
