= List of municipalities in Mato Grosso do Sul by HDI =

This is a list of municipalities in Mato Grosso do Sul ordered by Human Development Index (HDI) according to data released by the United Nations Development Program (UNDP) of the United Nations for the 2010. The Human Development Index was developed in 1990 by the Pakistani economist Mahbub ul Haq and the Indian economist Amartya Sen.

== Criteria ==
Map of HDI of the municipalities of Mato Grosso do Sul. Legend: Very High (no municipality) High (27 municipalities) Medium (47 municipalities) Low (4 municipalities) Very Low (no municipality) No data (1 municipality)

=== Categories ===
The index varies from 0 to 1, considering:

- Very high – 0.800 to 1.000
- High – 0.700 to 0.799
- Medium – 0.600 to 0.699
- Low – 0.500 to 0.599
- Very low – 0.000 to 0.499

=== Components ===
The HDI of the municipalities is an average between the income index, life expectancy index and educational index.

== List ==
Rank	Municipality	Data of 2010			
Rank	Municipality	HDI	Income Index	Life Expectancy Index	Educational Index
Very high HDI
no municipality
high HDI
1	Campo Grande	0.784	0.790	0.844	0.724
2	Chapadão do Sul	0.754	0.758	0.850	0.665
3	Dourados	0.747	0.753	0.843	0.657
4	Três Lagoas	0.744	0.752	0.849	0.645
5	Maracaju	0.736	0.744	0.873	0.613
6	São Gabriel do Oeste	0.729	0.751	0.850	0.608
7	Cassilândia	0.727	0.756	0.811	0.627
8	Paranaíba	0.721	0.727	0.823	0.627
9	Nova Andradina	0.721	0.716	0.850	0.616
10	Glória de Dourados	0.721	0.705	0.822	0.648
11	Ivinhema	0.720	0.715	0.850	0.615
12	Rio Brilhante	0.715	0.720	0.861	0.590
13	Fátima do Sul	0.714	0.719	0.815	0.621
14	Jardim	0.712	0.718	0.845	0.595
15	Alcinópolis	0.711	0.733	0.858	0.572
16	Vicentina	0.711	0.689	0.835	0.626
17	Bataguassu	0.710	0.698	0.847	0.606
18	Rio Negro	0.709	0.702	0.869	0.585
19	Jateí	0.708	0.716	0.857	0.579
20	Costa Rica	0.706	0.717	0.811	0.606
21	Ladário	0.704	0.687	0.822	0.618
22	Camapuã	0.703	0.715	0.817	0.596
23	Coxim	0.703	0.719	0.836	0.579
24	Ponta Porã	0.701	0.708	0.812	0.598
25	Brasilândia	0.701	0.721	0.837	0.570
26	Corumbá	0.700	0.701	0.834	0.586
27	Naviraí	0.700	0.715	0.803	0.597
Medium HDI
28	Douradina	0.699	0.706	0.809	0.597
29	Bela Vista	0.698	0.699	0.830	0.585
30	Aparecida do Taboado	0.697	0.717	0.804	0.588
31	Angélica	0.697	0.692	0.839	0.582
32	Deodápolis	0.694	0.693	0.810	0.595
33	Nova Alvorada do Sul	0.694	0.746	0.809	0.554
34	Caarapó	0.692	0.676	0.828	0.592
35	Aquidauana	0.688	0.690	0.840	0.562
36	Mundo Novo	0.686	0.707	0.808	0.565
37	Sidrolândia	0.686	0.694	0.829	0.561
38	Batayporã	0.684	0.702	0.814	0.559
39	Eldorado	0.684	0.674	0.824	0.577
40	Selvíria	0.682	0.668	0.825	0.576
41	Bandeirantes	0.681	0.694	0.848	0.537
42	Inocência	0.681	0.702	0.846	0.531
43	Sonora	0.681	0.706	0.803	0.557
44	Guia Lopes da Laguna	0.675	0.677	0.826	0.549
45	Rio Verde de Mato Grosso	0.673	0.686	0.852	0.521
46	Amambai	0.673	0.683	0.818	0.546
47	Laguna Carapã	0.672	0.676	0.822	0.545
48	Corguinho	0.671	0.684	0.830	0.531
49	Pedro Gomes	0.671	0.672	0.801	0.562
50	Bonito	0.670	0.714	0.831	0.508
51	Anaurilândia	0.670	0.676	0.826	0.538
52	Água Clara	0.670	0.705	0.823	0.518
53	Porto Murtinho	0.666	0.677	0.830	0.526
54	Bodoquena	0.666	0.665	0.776	0.573
55	Ribas do Rio Pardo	0.664	0.681	0.830	0.519
56	Jaraguari	0.664	0.668	0.827	0.530
57	Anastácio	0.663	0.663	0.789	0.557
58	Iguatemi	0.662	0.671	0.817	0.530
59	Figueirão	0.660	0.677	0.830	0.511
60	Terenos	0.658	0.651	0.839	0.521
61	Itaporã	0.654	0.660	0.809	0.523
62	Rochedo	0.651	0.676	0.830	0.491
63	Taquarussu	0.651	0.657	0.769	0.545
64	Novo Horizonte do Sul	0.649	0.656	0.798	0.523
65	Caracol	0.647	0.628	0.826	0.522
66	Antônio João	0.643	0.633	0.799	0.526
67	Santa Rita do Pardo	0.642	0.655	0.800	0.505
68	Nioaque	0.639	0.658	0.822	0.483
69	Dois Irmãos do Buriti	0.639	0.640	0.773	0.528
70	Aral Moreira	0.633	0.628	0.798	0.507
71	Miranda	0.632	0.638	0.782	0.507
72	Juti	0.623	0.646	0.770	0.485
73	Itaquiraí	0.620	0.645	0.772	0.479
74	Sete Quedas	0.614	0.660	0.778	0.450
Low HDI
75	Tacuru	0.593	0.615	0.782	0.434
76	Coronel Sapucaia	0.589	0.607	0.806	0.417
77	Paranhos	0.588	0.566	0.811	0.444
78	Japorã	0.526	0.547	0.791	0.337
Very Low HDI
no municipality
No data
Paraíso das Águas

== See also ==
- Geography of Brazil
- List of cities in Brazil
