= TV Morena =

TV Morena (ZYA 942)
- Campo Grande, Mato Grosso do Sul; Brazil
- Channels: Digital: 30 (UHF); Virtual: 6

Programming
- Affiliations: TV Globo

Ownership
- Owner: Rede Matogrossense de Comunicação (Grupo Zahran); (Televisão Morena Ltda.)

History
- First air date: December 25, 1965
- Former channel numbers: Analog: 6 (VHF, 1965–2017)
- Former affiliations: TV Excelsior (1965–1969); Rede Tupi (1965–1976); REI (1965–1976)

Technical information
- Licensing authority: ANATEL
- ERP: 6 kW
- Transmitter coordinates: 20°28′46.3″S 54°36′1.2″W

Links
- Public license information: Profile
- Website: redeglobo.globo.com/tvmorena

TV Morena is a Brazilian television station based in Campo Grande, capital of the state of Mato Grosso do Sul. It operates on channel 6 (UHF digital 30) and is affiliated to TV Globo. It is owned by Rede Matogrossense de Comunicação, a television network of the Zahran Group that operates in the states of Mato Grosso do Sul and Mato Grosso, with TV Morena being the network head for the former, as well as the first station of the network to be founded, in 1965.

== History ==
In 1963, the brothers Eduardo, Nagib and Ueze Zahran, owners of the gas trading company Copagaz, requested concessions from the National Telecommunications Council for television operations in the cities of Cuiabá, Campo Grande and Corumbá, in the state of Mato Grosso. The second one was even disputed by a local merchant, who ended up giving up on getting it. Ueze went to Rio de Janeiro to contact journalist Antonieta Ries Coelho and leave her responsible for providing documentation for the process. The following year, so that Campo Grande could receive its first broadcaster, brokers from the Zahran firm began selling television sets purchased in São Paulo to the population in anticipation of the launch of TV Morena, whose VHF channel 6 was granted by decree published in the Official Gazette of the Union on October 12, 1965.

The transmission tests were carried out in the first days of December of that year, with images generated from an improvised studio in Jorge Zahran's residence for televisions located in parts of the city. TV Morena officially went live on December 24, Christmas Eve, in an event partially interrupted by a power outage that was attended by then-mayor Mendes Canale and blessed by Bishop Dom Antônio Barbosa. During this period, the station showed programs from TV Excelsior and TV Record, and had five hours of local programming.

Subsequently, the Zahran Group opened stations in Cuiabá (TV Centro América) and Corumbá (TV Cidade Branca). With others in the state, they would form Rede Matogrossense de Televisão, which in 1976 affiliated with Rede Globo. In 1977, the dismemberment of the current state of Mato Grosso do Sul began,[10] where TV Morena and TV Cidade Branca began to generate their programming, while TV Centro América was responsible for Mato Grosso, giving birth to the two-state character of RMT as a television network.

On November 11, 2011, the station signed an agreement with the Football Federation of Mato Grosso do Sul to exclusively broadcast the Sul-Mato-Grossense Football Championship from the 2012 edition onwards. The tournament was shown on the channel until 2021, when the contract with the federation was not renewed.

== Technical information ==
Virtual channel	Digital channel	Screen	Content
6.1	30 UHF	1080i	TV Morena/Globo's main schedule

With the equipment for digital signal transmission, such as cameras, editing lines and transmitter, acquired in advance, TV Morena was authorized to operate on channel 30 UHF after signing an act by the Secretary of Electronic Communication Services of the Ministry of Comunicações Zilda Beatriz de Abreu on May 4, 2009, launching it on the same day.

Based on the federal decree transitioning Brazilian TV stations from analogue to digital signals, TV Morena, as well as the other stations in Campo Grande, ceased broadcasting on VHF channel 6 on October 31, 2018, following the official timeline from ANATEL.

== Programming ==
In addition to retransmitting TV Globo's national programming, TV Morena produces and broadcasts the following programs:

- Bom Dia MS: News, with Maurren Mattiello;
- MSTV 1.ª edição: News, with Bruna Mendes;
- Globo Esporte MS: Sports news, with Átilla Eugênio;
- MSTV 2.ª edição: News, with Lucimar Lescano;
- Meu MS: Entertainment, with Ellen Rocha, Gê Louveira and Raul Ruffo;
- Mais Agro: Agribusiness news, com Edevaldo Nascimento

Since February 1, 2021, TV Morena and its stations in the interior of the state have shown the news program Hora Um da Notícia with a one-hour delay, to broadcast Bom Dia MS at a time accessible to the public. To make this happen, the broadcaster shows the Terra da Gente program before the news, produced by EPTV, the network's affiliate in the interior of São Paulo. Several other programs made up the broadcaster's schedule and were discontinued:

- Calouros da Chimbica
- Módulo 6
- Morena Esporte
- Notícias do Dia
- Variedades na TV

== Relayers ==
List of relay stations

City	Analog	Digital	City	Analog	Digital	City	Analog	Digital
Água Clara	07	-	Anastácio	10	30	Aquidauana	-	10 (30)
Bandeirantes	02	-	Bodoquena	12	30	Bonito	07	30
Camapuã	07	-	Chapadão do Sul	04	-	Corguinho	-	12 (30)
Costa Rica	04	29	Coxim	09	-	Jardim	05	-
Miranda	-	05 (31)	Nioaque	08	-	Nova Alvorada do Sul	03	-
Paraíso das Águas	09	-	Pedro Gomes	03	-	Porto Murtinho	06	30
Ribas do Rio Pardo	13	-	Rio Negro	11	-	Rio Verde de Mato Grosso	12	-
São Gabriel do Oeste	10	30	Sonora	13	-
