= Greater Dourados Region =

Region in Mato Grosso do Sul, Brazil

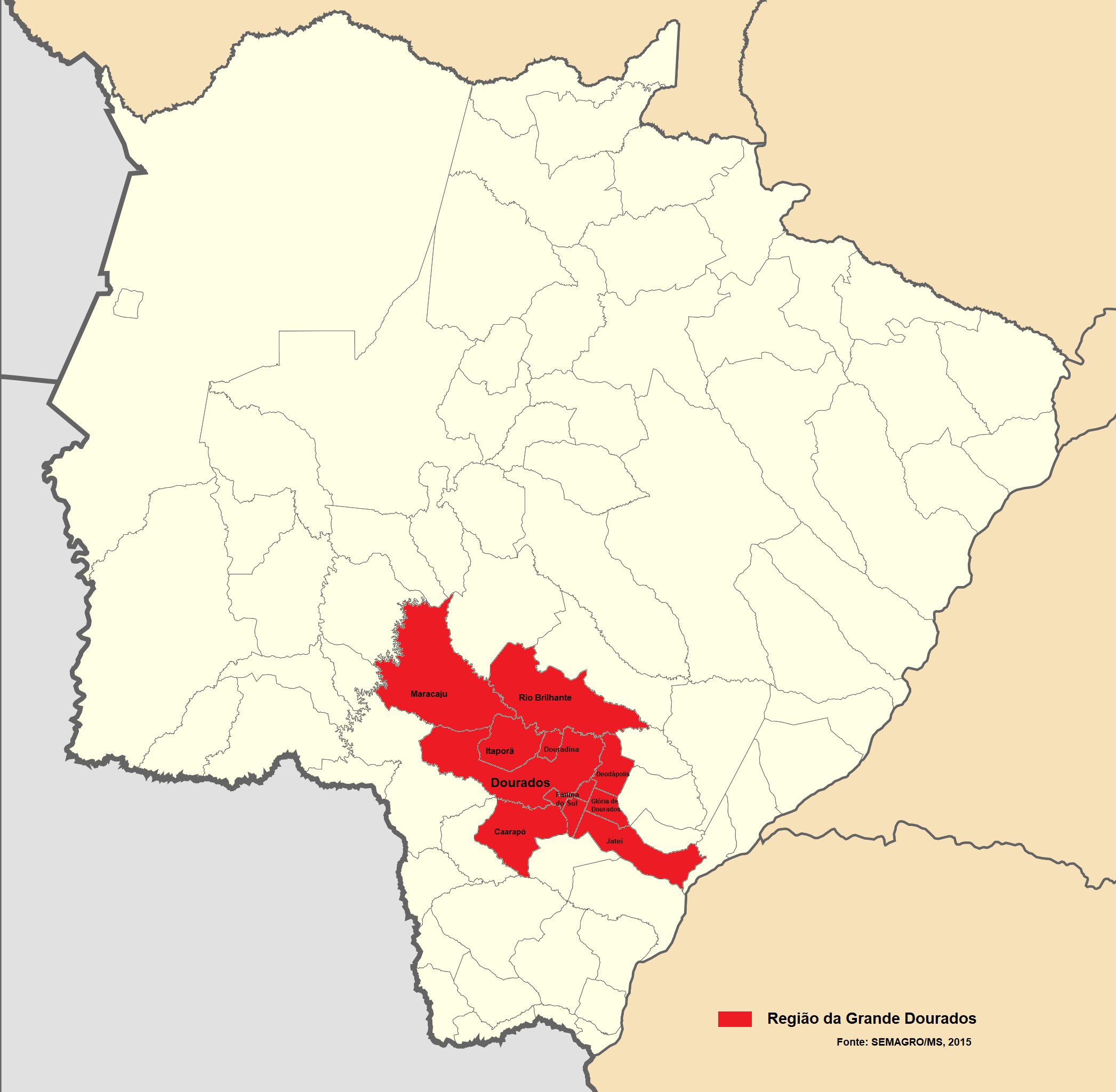
Greater Dourados Region in 2015.

The Greater Dourados region is mostly a territorial part of the state of Mato Grosso do Sul and, according to its territorial dimensions, the regional development policy is planned and proposed by the State Secretariat for the Environment and Economic Development of Mato Grosso do Sul. Mato Grosso do Sul Research: planning area.

The Greater Dourados region is made up of 11 municipalities: Dourados (polo), Caarapó, Deodápolis, Douradina, Fátima do Sul, Glória de Dourados, Itaporã, Jateí, Maracaju, Rio Brilhante and Vicentina. These municipalities together have a total area of around 21 thousand km2, a population of around 500 thousand inhabitants and a GDP of around 25 billion reais.

The region is overlapped by the immediate geographic region of Dourados delimited by the Brazilian Institute of Geography and Statistics - IBGE, which also includes the municipalities of Laguna Carapã and Juti, and covers the areas of influence of the Municipality of Dourados.

This is a region that has undergone rapid economic growth based on the exploitation of large crops (soy, corn and wheat) and livestock farming. Today, little of the original vegetation cover remains. The main crops exploited in the Region are concentrated in the municipalities of Maracaju, Caarapó, Rio Brilhante, Itaporã and Dourados, the latter being one of the largest agribusiness centers in Brazil.
