= Miss Mato Grosso do Sul =

Brazilian beauty pageant

Miss Mato Grosso do Sul Miss Universe Mato Grosso do Sul
- Formation: 1979
- Type: Beauty pageant
- Headquarters: Mato Grosso do Sul, Brazil
- Members: Miss Brazil
- Official language: Portuguese
- State Director: Frank Rossatte

Miss Mato Grosso do Sul is a Brazilian Beauty pageant which selects the representative for the State of Mato Grosso do Sul at the Miss Brazil contest. The pageant was created in 1979 and has been held every year since with the exception of 1990-1991, 1993, and 2020. The pageant is held annually with representation of several municipalities. Since 2023, the State director of Miss Mato Grosso do Sul is, Frank Rossatte.

The following women from who competed as Miss Mato Grosso do Sul have won Miss Brazil:

- Michella Dauzacker Marchi, from Dourados, in 1998

== Results summary ==
=== Placements ===
- Miss Brazil: Michella Dauzacker Marchi (1998)
- 1st Runner-Up: Denize Demirdjian (1983)
- 2nd Runner-Up: Ana Cristina Cestari (1986)
- 3rd Runner-Up: Ana Carina Góis Homa (1996); Rhaíssa Espindola Siviero Olmedo (2006)
- 4th Runner-Up:
- Top 5/Top 7/Top 8:
- Top 10/Top 11/Top 12: Vânia Regina Torraca (1979); Rossana S. Justiniano (1984); Deusa Aparecida Ottoni (1989); Flávia Roberta Lopes (1994); Letícia de Souza Ávila (2002); Raíza Machado Vidal (2011)
- Top 15/Top 16: Pilar Velásquez (2009); Kátia Martins Talon (2010); Patrícia Machry Barbosa (2013)

=== Special awards ===
- Miss Photogenic:
- Miss Congeniality:

== Titleholders ==
The titleholders for Miss Mato Grosso do Sul since 1979. There were women from the state that competed for Miss Brazil before 1979 but they competed as Miss Mato Grosso as Mato Grosso and Mato Grosso do Sul were once one state called Mato Grosso. Women that competed in Miss Brazil before 1979 are included in the Miss Mato Grosso article due to them being Miss Mato Grosso and not Miss Mato Grosso do Sul.

Year	Name	Age (Note: Ages at the time of the pageant)	Height	Represented	Miss Brazil placement	Notes
Miss Universe Mato Grosso do Sul
2024	Lulu Oliveira	41	1.64 m (5 ft 4 1/2 in)	Appointed		
2023	Rebeca Campos Vianna	24	1.84 m (6 ft 1/2 in)	Campo Grande		
2022	Giovanna Grigolli	25	1.74 m (5 ft 8 1/2 in)	Três Lagoas		Previously crowned Miss Mato Grosso do Sul Be Emotion 2018
2021	Maria Eduarda Giraldi	18	1.77 m (5 ft 9 1/2 in)	Dourados		
U Miss Mato Grosso do Sul 2020 and Miss Mato Grosso do Sul Be Emotion 2020
2020	No national Miss Brazil contest due to the COVID-19 pandemic and change in the national franchise holder which caused the national titleholder to be appointed.					
Miss Mato Grosso do Sul Be Emotion
2019	Kasiane Klein			Iguatemi	Did not compete	Took over after original winner was dethroned. Last Miss Miss Mato Grosso do Sul Be Emotion
2019	Priscilla Vacchiano	24	1.76 m (5 ft 9 1/2 in)	Campo Grande		Later dethroned after becoming pregnant.
2018	Giovanna Grigolli	20	1.74 m (5 ft 8 1/2 in)	Três Lagoas		Later crowned Miss Universe Mato Grosso do Sul 2022
2017	Isabela Cavalcante	23	1.68 m (5 ft 6 in)	Aquidauana		
2016	Yara Deckner Volpe	20	1.75 m (5 ft 9 in)	Campo Grande		
2015	Camila Ferreira Greggo	22	1.77 m (5 ft 9 1/2 in)	Glória de Dourados		
Miss Mato Grosso do Sul Universe
2014	Érika Rodrigues de Moura	20	1.75 m (5 ft 9 in)	Três Lagoas		
2013	Patrícia Machry Barbosa	20	1.78 m (5 ft 10 in)	Sidrolândia	Top 15	
2012	Karen Recalde Rodrigues	22	1.77 m (5 ft 9 1/2 in)	Três Lagoas		
Miss Mato Grosso do Sul
2011	Raíza Machado Vidal	22		Ivinhema	Top 10	
2010	Kátia Martins Talon			Naviraí	Top 15	
2009	Pilar Velásquez	23	1.76 m (5 ft 9 1/2 in)	Campo Grande	Top 15	
2008	Tainara Terena Ferreira da Silva Terenada	19		Aquidauana		
2007	Eigla Carla Pereira de Oliveira			Campo Grande		
2006	Rhaíssa Espindola Siviero Olmedo			Amambai	3rd Runner-Up	
2005	Laila Teixeira Ramos			Dois Irmãos do Buriti		
2004	Maisa Krüger		1.83 m (6 ft 0 in)	Dourados		
2003	Michelly Karini de Freitas			Ponta Porã		
2002	Letícia de Souza Ávila			Aquidauana	Top 10	
2001	Ana Flora Nimer Gomes			Ponta Porã		
2000	Cláudia Renata Rohde Fisch			Campo Grande		
1999	Mirian Jackeline Esteche Pavão			Ponta Porã		
1998	Michella Dauzacker Marchi	20	1.79 m (5 ft 10 1/2 in)	Dourados	Miss Brazil 1998	Top 10 at Miss Universe 1998.
1997	Tatiana da Costa Oliveira			Ponta Porã		
1996	Ana Carina Góis Homa			Campo Grande	3rd Runner-Up	Competed at Miss International 1996
1995	Cláudia Provenzano			Corumbá		
1994	Flávia Roberta Lopes			Nova Andradina	Top 12	
1993	No delegate sent in 1993 due to Miss Brazil 1993 being appointed rather than having a contest.					
1992	Karlotte Eloiza Testoni			Campo Grande		
1991	No delegate sent in 1991.					
1990	No contest in 1990.					
1989	Deusa Aparecida Ottoni			Campo Grande	Top 12	
1988	Annelisy Faria da Cunha			Campo Grande		
1987	Eleny Monteiro Migliorini			Nova Andradina		
1986	Ana Cristina Cestari			Douradina	2nd Runner-Up	
1985	Kátia de Oliveira Pereira			Aquidauana		
1984	Rossana S. Justiniano				Top 12	
1983	Denize Demirdjian			Campo Grande	1st Runner-Up	
1982	Margarida da Silva			Aquidauana		
1981	Geanine Veiber Silva			Campo Grande		
1980	Nélia Araújo Delgado			Corumbá		
1979	Vânia Regina Torraca			Ponta Porã	Top 12	
