= First Retreat =

Battle of River Feio
- Part of the Mato Grosso campaign
Date	1 January 1865
Location	Guia Lopes da Laguna, Empire of Brazil
Result	Paraguayan victory

Belligerents
Paraguay	Empire of Brazil

Commanders and leaders
Blas Rojas	Dias da Silva

Strength
2,000 soldiers	200 soldiers and civilians

Casualties and losses
3–60 casualties	70 casualties

The Battle of River Feio or First Withdrawal, was an episode that occurred even at the beginning of the Mato Grosso Campaign in which about 200 Brazilians between civilians and soldiers under the command of Col. Dias da Silva faced a Paraguayan column of 2,000 men commanded by Captain Blas Rojas. After a failed attempt at dialogue between both parties, the two forces engaged in combat in the vicinity of the Feio River, in the municipality of Laguna on 1 January 1865, where the outcome was defeat and withdrawal of the imperial forces to Nioaque. It is considered the first Brazilian reaction after the invasion of the Empire. It was known as the First Retreat due to the defeat and subsequent withdrawal of soldiers from the Laguna region, preceding the famous Laguna Retreat that occurred two years later.

== The Battle ==
After the Brazilian commander's refusal to surrender, Rojas ordered an artillery shot at the Brazilian forces, who fled from the area towards the Santo Antônio River. In pursuit is a cavalry battalion under the command of Lieutenant Blas Ovando. Upon meeting with his troops, Dias da Silva orders the destruction of a bridge that connected the Desarrrancado to the Miranda farm in order to prevent the enemy from frustrating their withdrawal. Pedro Rufino and his 21 face Paraguayans on the banks of the Feio River and manage to claim three casualties on them, including an officer, Lieutenant Camilo Castelo, however such Paraguayan record may be inaccurate. Also according to this record, Brazilian casualties totaled 57 dead squads and 13 prisoners, this number being contested by Colonel Dias da Silva and two other officers.

On 1 January 1865, about 200 Brazilians are forced to retreat, making the first retreat from the Lagoon on the banks of the Feio River, heading towards the Santo Antônio River. The Brazilian commander orders the bridge to be set on fire and retired to Nioaque.
