= Sanga Puitã =

- Location in Brazil
- Coordinates: 22°37′19″S 55°37′17″W
- Country: Brazil
- State: Mato Grosso do Sul
- Municipality: Ponta Porã

Sanga Puitã is a district of the Brazilian municipality of Ponta Porã, in the state of Mato Grosso do Sul. The city lies on the border with the Paraguayan city of Zanja Pytá in the Amambay Department.
