= Ponta Porã =

- Municipality
- The Municipality of Ponta Porã
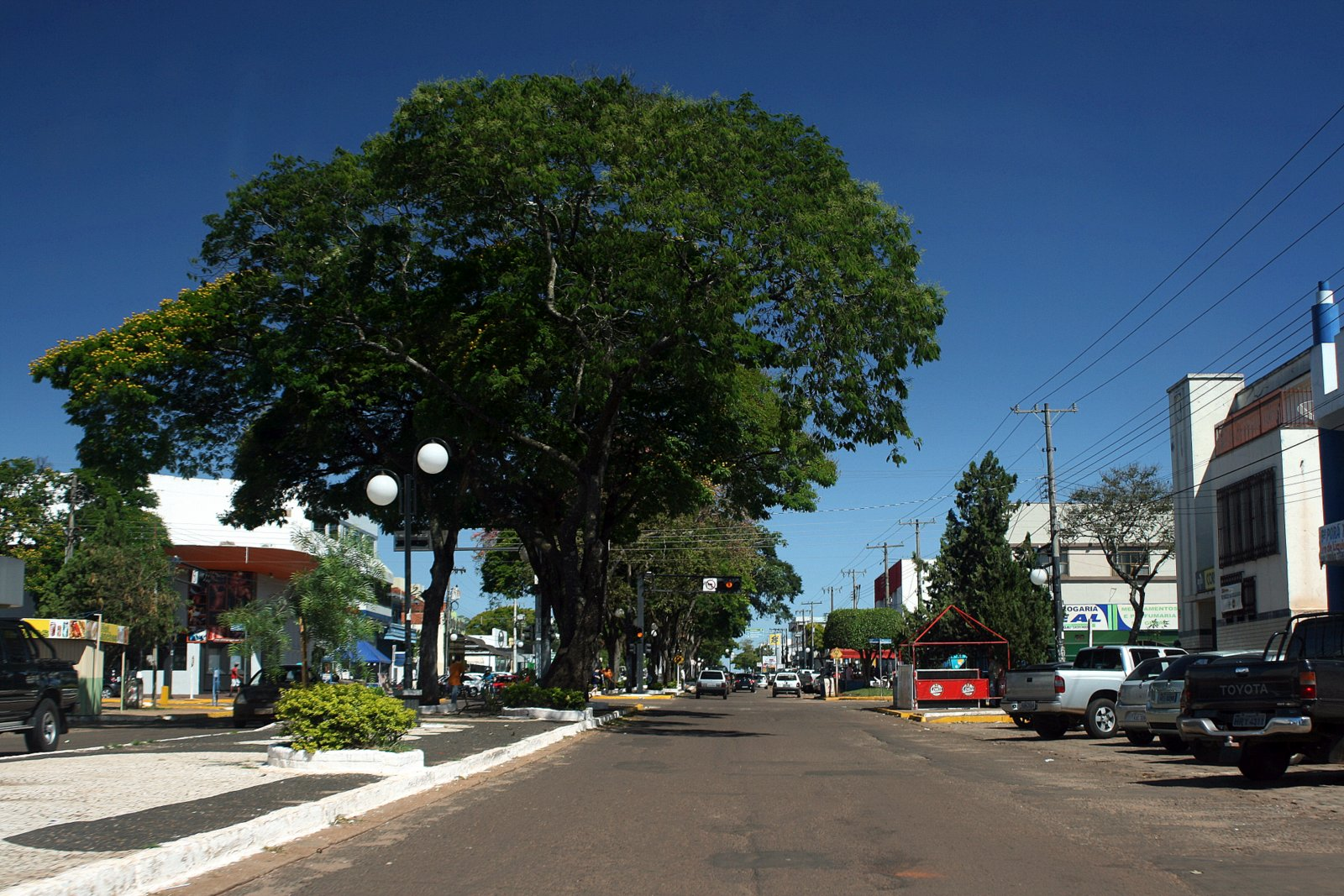
- Avenida Brasil (Brasil Avenue)

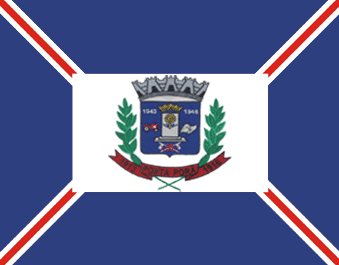
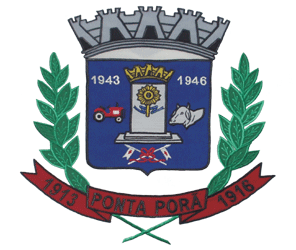
- Flag Coat of arms

- Location of Ponta Porã
- Coordinates: 22°32′09″S 55°43′33″W
- Country: Brazil
- Region: Central-West
- State: Mato Grosso do Sul
- Emancipated: July 18, 1912

Government
  - Mayor: Eduardo Campos (PSDB, 2025–2028)

Area
  - Total: 5,328.621 km^{2} (2,057.392 sq mi)
- Elevation: 755 m (2,477 ft)

Population (2026)
  - Total: 99,572
  - Density: 15.716/km^{2} (40.70/sq mi)
- Time zone: UTC−4 (AMT)
- HDI (2010): 0.701 – high
- Climate: Cfa
- Website: www.pontapora.ms.gov.br

Ponta Porã is a municipality located in the Brazilian state of Mato Grosso do Sul. Its population is 99,572 (2026) and its area is 5,329 km^{2}. It has a dry border and a conurbation with the city of Pedro Juan Caballero in Paraguay.

Ponta Porã is 1,346 kilometres (836 mi) away from Brasília, the country's capital, and 324 kilometres (201 mi) away from Campo Grande, the state capital. Ponta Porã has a humid subtropical climate with temperatures averaging 29 °C (84 °F) throughout the year. The city's economy is focused on agriculture and livestock. The main crops found near the city are soybeans, wheat and corn.

Ponta Porã International Airport is located in the municipality with scheduled flights to São Paulo.

== History ==
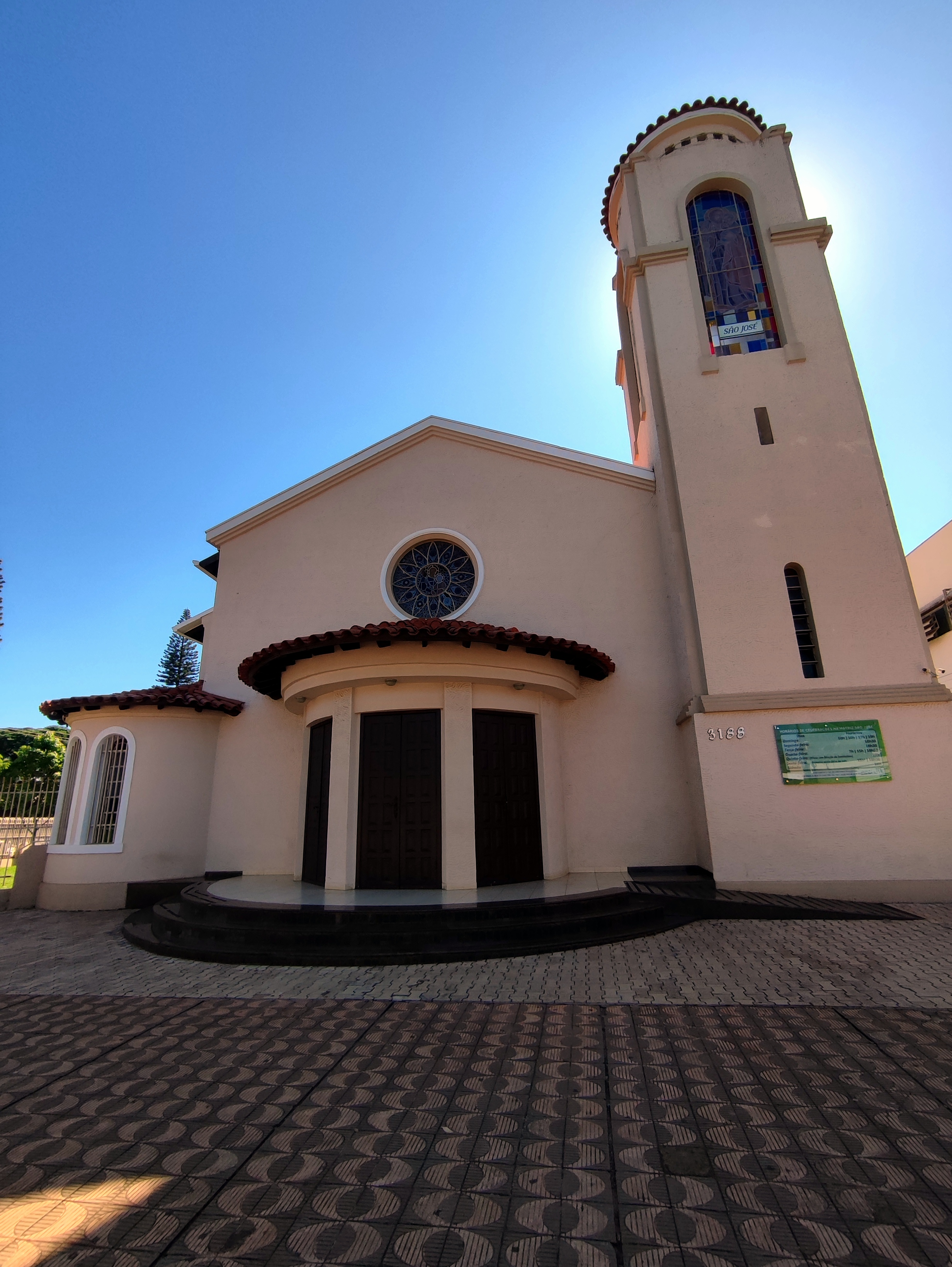

The origin of Ponta Porã begins with the formation of a village called Punta Porã.

Before the Paraguayan War, the site of the city was a deserted region in the interior of Paraguay inhabited by tribes of Indians, such as Nhandevas and Caiuás, descendants of the Guarani people. The region was also a place where travelers stopped to rest while crossing from Brazil to Paraguay. In 1777 a military expedition arrived in the region, aiming to explore the region. In 1862 the military unit led by Lieutenant Antonio João Ribeiro established a base near the Dourados River (in what is now the municipality of Antônio João) and there founded the Military Colony of Dourados. In 1864, the time of the Paraguayan War, the Military Colony of Dourados was destroyed by the Paraguayans, and Lieutenant Ribeiro was killed.

In 1872, after the end of the Paraguayan War, the border between Brazil and Paraguay was definitely established, leaving the region of Ponta Porã in Brazilian territory. In 1880 arrived in the region Mr. Nazareth, a military commander who established his camp in what is now the city of Pedro Juan Caballero. In 1882, Tomás Laranjeiras started producing and selling yerba mate in Ponta Porã and exporting it to Argentina. In 1892, with the garrison of the Military Colony of Dourados protecting the region, Ponta Porã begun to make its initial economic progress. Furthermore, many gaucho immigrants arrived, who came to work in agriculture and raise cattle. In 1897 the first police department in Ponta Porã was created and Mr. Nazareth was appointed its commander.

Ponta Porã became part of the District of Bela Vista, Mato Grosso do Sul in 1900. In 1913 the municipality of Ponta Porã was founded, the city no longer belonging to the district of Bela Vista. The first Mayor appointed was Ponciano de Matos Pereira. In 1915 the Governor of the State of Mato Grosso, Caetano de Albuquerque raised the status of Ponta Porã's municipality to county and in 1916 the first Judge of Ponta Porã's County was appointed, Possidônio de Souza Guimarães. In 1919 was created in Ponta Porã the 11th Cavalry Regiment and the following year its first commander was installed, Captain Hipólito Paes. In 1943, President Getúlio Vargas created the Federal Territory of Ponta Porã, with Ponta Porã as its capital city. In 1977 the state of Mato Grosso do Sul was created, of which Ponta Porã is currently part.

== Geography ==
=== Location ===
The municipality of Ponta Porã is located at the south of the Center-West region of Brazil.

Nearby cities:

- 324 km from the state capital (Campo Grande)
- 1346 km from the country's capital (Brasília).
- 54 km from Antônio João
- 118 km from Dourados
- 126 km from Bela Vista
- 180 km from Rio Brilhante
- 209 km from Naviraí
- 235 km from Eldorado
- 256 km from Mundo Novo
- 292 km from Nova Andradina
- 278 km from Guaíra - PR
- 425 km from Cascavel - PR
- 368 km from Umuarama - PR
- 536 km from Foz do Iguaçu - PR
- 904 km from Curitiba - PR
- 671 km from São Miguel do Oeste - SC
- 1243 km from Porto Alegre - RS

== Consular representation ==
Paraguay has a Consulate in Ponta Porã.

== In popular culture ==
Ponta Porã is the main setting in the beginning of the John Grisham novel The Partner.
