= Zanja Pytá =

Zanja Pytá Zanja Pytã
- City and district
- Location within Paraguay
- Coordinates: 22.6314°S 55.6315°W
- Country: Paraguay
- Department: Amambay
- Created: 2012

Government
  - Intendant: Marcelino Rolón (ANR)

Area
  - Total: 2,106 km^{2} (813 sq mi)

Population (Est. 2021)
  - Total: 8,165
  - Density: 3.877/km^{2} (10.04/sq mi)
- Time zone: UTC-03 (PYT)
- Climate: Cfa

Zanja Pytá (Guarani for 'Red Trench') is a city and district in Paraguay, located in the Amambay Department. It was previously part of the Pedro Juan Caballero District and became independent in 2012.

The city is situated on the border with the Brazilian city of Sanga Puitã in the state of Mato Grosso do Sul. According to estimations by the National Institute of Statistics (INE), Zanja Pytá has an estimated population of 8,165 inhabitants.
