= Bandeirantes, Mato Grosso do Sul =

Bandeirantes
- Municipality
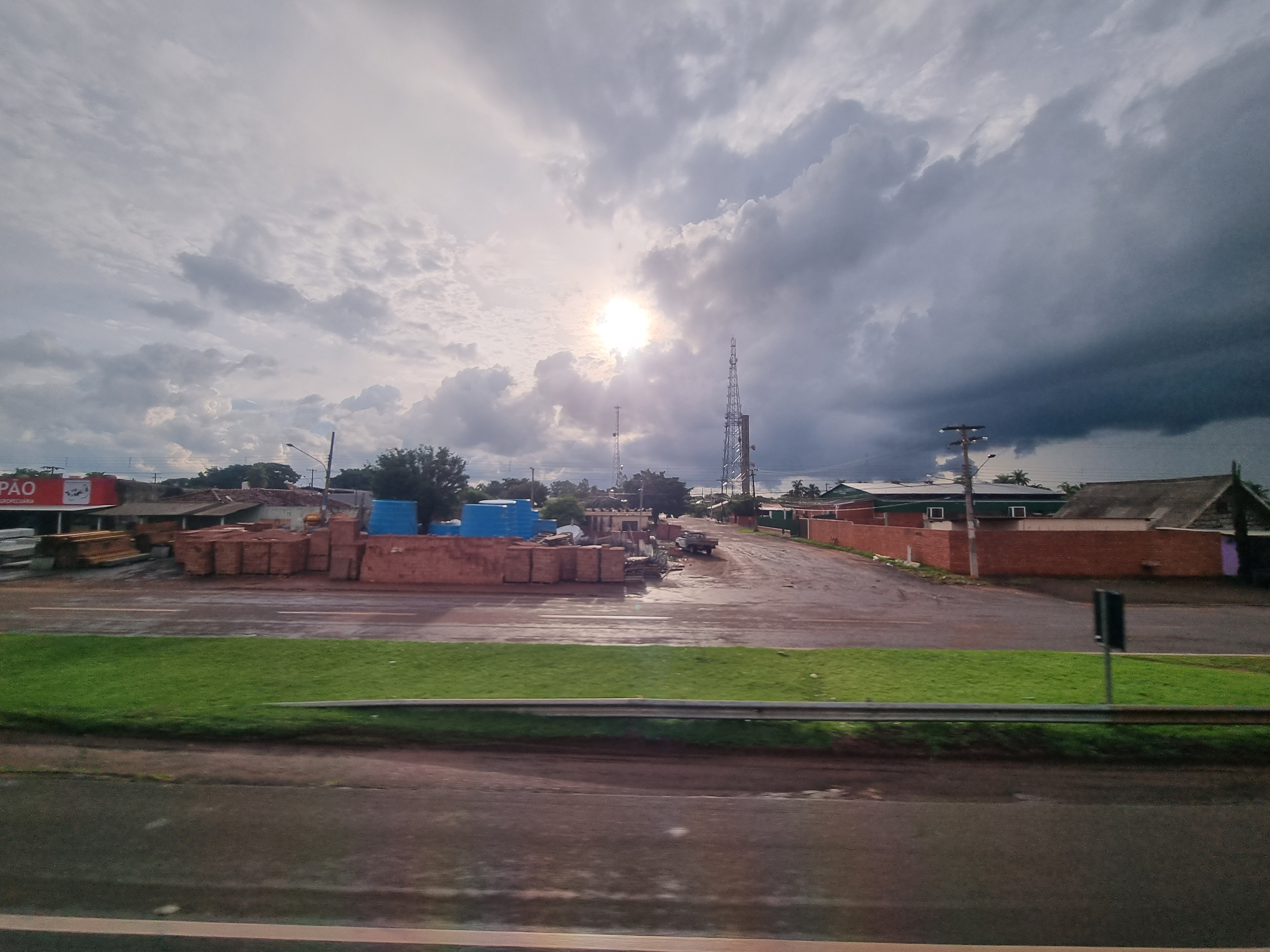

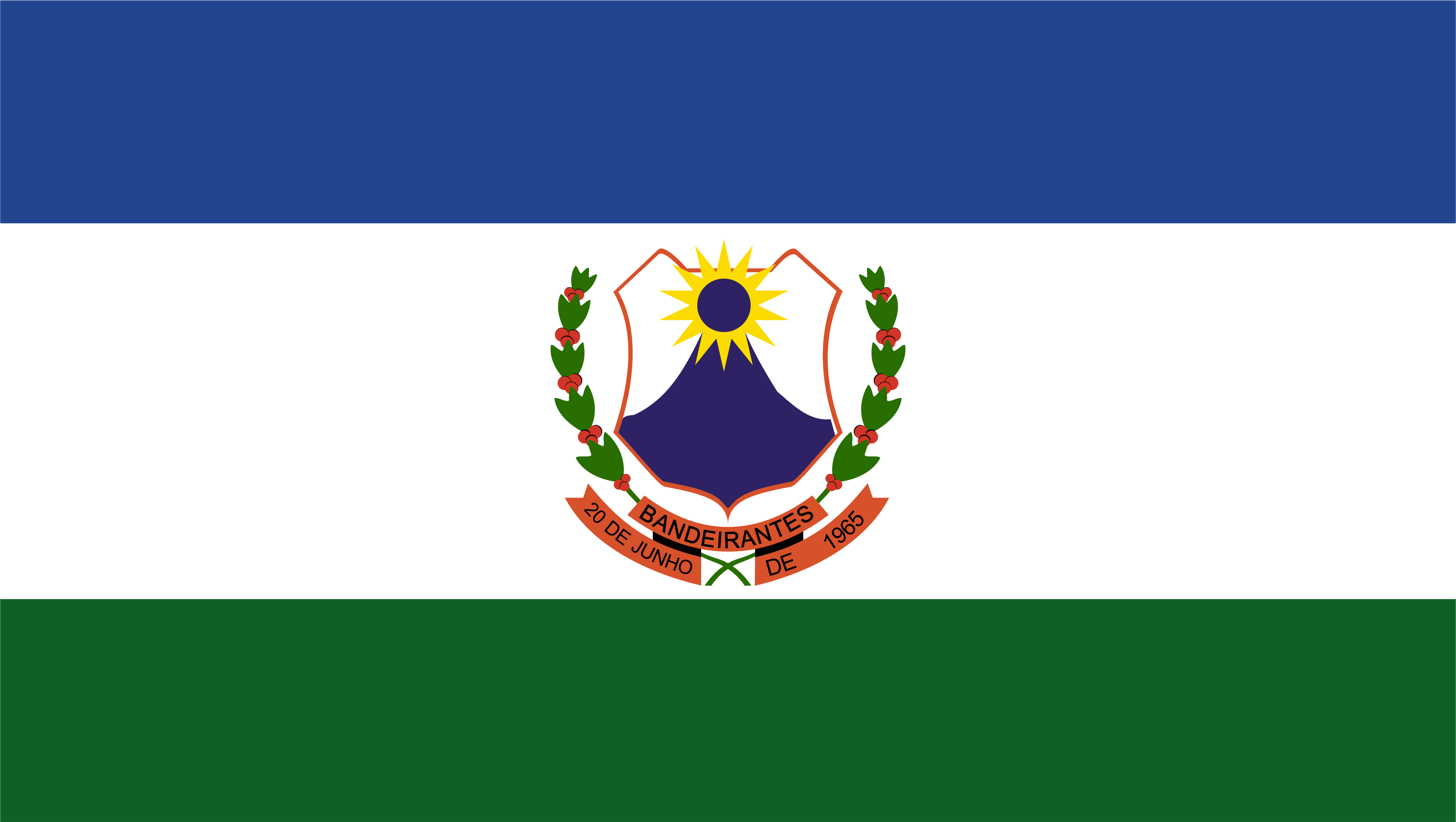
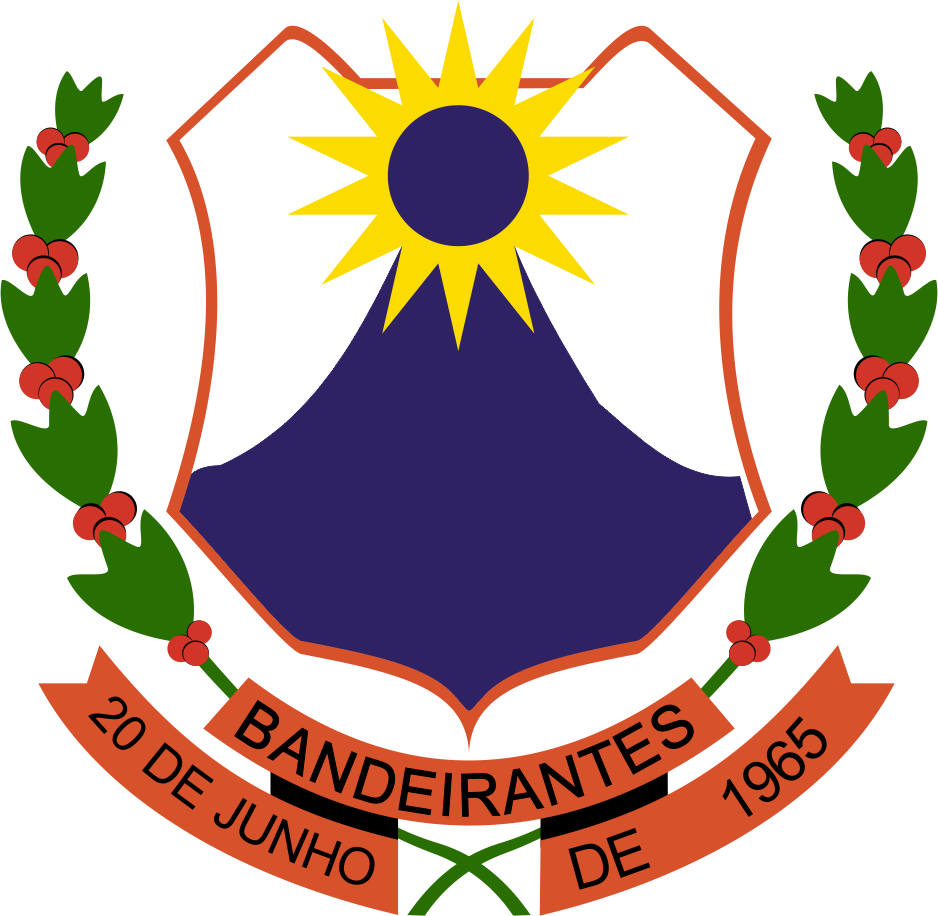
- Flag Coat of arms

- Location in Mato Grosso do Sul state

- Location in Brazil
- Coordinates: 19°55′02″S 54°21′50″W
- Country: Brazil
- Region: Central-West
- State: Mato Grosso do Sul

Area
  - Total: 3,116 km^{2} (1,203 sq mi)
- Elevation: 629 m (2,064 ft)

Population (2020)
  - Total: 72,660
  - Density: 23.32/km^{2} (60.39/sq mi)
- Time zone: UTC−4 (AMT)

Bandeirantes is a municipality located in the Brazilian state of Mato Grosso do Sul. Its population was 7,266 (2020) and its area is 3,116 km^{2} (1,203 sq mi).
