= List of municipalities in Mato Grosso do Sul =

This is a list of the municipalities in the state of Mato Grosso do Sul (MS), located in the Central-West Region of Brazil. Mato Grosso do Sul is divided into 79 municipalities, which are grouped into 11 microregions, which are grouped into 4 mesoregions.

Municipalities of Mato Grosso do Sul, Brazil

| Mesoregion | Microregion | # | Municipality | Population (2022) | Area (km²) |
|---|---|---|---|---|---|
| Centro Norte de Mato Grosso do Sul | Alto Taquari | 2 | Alcinópolis | 4,537 | 4397 |
| Centro Norte de Mato Grosso do Sul | Alto Taquari | 19 | Camapuã | 13,583 | 6238 |
| Centro Norte de Mato Grosso do Sul | Alto Taquari | * | Figueirão | 3,539 | 4800 |
| Centro Norte de Mato Grosso do Sul | Alto Taquari | 28 | Coxim | 32,151 | 6390 |
| Centro Norte de Mato Grosso do Sul | Alto Taquari | 59 | Pedro Gomes | 6,941 | 3553 |
| Centro Norte de Mato Grosso do Sul | Alto Taquari | 65 | Rio Verde de Mato Grosso | 19,818 | 8174 |
| Centro Norte de Mato Grosso do Sul | Alto Taquari | 68 | São Gabriel do Oeste | 29,579 | 3850 |
| Centro Norte de Mato Grosso do Sul | Alto Taquari | 72 | Sonora | 14,516 | 4185 |
| Centro Norte de Mato Grosso do Sul | Campo Grande | 11 | Bandeirantes | 7,940 | 3363 |
| Centro Norte de Mato Grosso do Sul | Campo Grande | 20 | Campo Grande (State Capital) | 898,100 | 8082 |
| Centro Norte de Mato Grosso do Sul | Campo Grande | 24 | Corguinho | 4,783 | 2638 |
| Centro Norte de Mato Grosso do Sul | Campo Grande | 43 | Jaraguari | 7,139 | 2913 |
| Centro Norte de Mato Grosso do Sul | Campo Grande | 64 | Rio Negro | 4,841 | 1828 |
| Centro Norte de Mato Grosso do Sul | Campo Grande | 66 | Rochedo | 5,199 | 1304 |
| Centro Norte de Mato Grosso do Sul | Campo Grande | 71 | Sidrolândia | 47,118 | 5265 |
| Centro Norte de Mato Grosso do Sul | Campo Grande | 75 | Terenos | 17,652 | 2845 |
| Leste de Mato Grosso do Sul | Cassilândia | 22 | Cassilândia | 20,988 | 3711 |
| Leste de Mato Grosso do Sul | Cassilândia | 23 | Chapadão do Sul | 30,993 | 3252 |
| Leste de Mato Grosso do Sul | Cassilândia | 27 | Costa Rica | 26,037 | 4159 |
| Leste de Mato Grosso do Sul | Cassilândia | * | Paraíso das Águas | 5,510 | 5061 |
| Leste de Mato Grosso do Sul | Nova Andradina | 5 | Anaurilândia | 7,653 | 3415 |
| Leste de Mato Grosso do Sul | Nova Andradina | 12 | Bataguassu | 23,031 | 2392 |
| Leste de Mato Grosso do Sul | Nova Andradina | 13 | Batayporã | 10,712 | 1826 |
| Leste de Mato Grosso do Sul | Nova Andradina | 55 | Nova Andradina | 48,563 | 4768 |
| Leste de Mato Grosso do Sul | Nova Andradina | 74 | Taquarussu | 3,625 | 1052 |
| Leste de Mato Grosso do Sul | Paranaíba | 8 | Aparecida do Taboado | 27,674 | 2751 |
| Leste de Mato Grosso do Sul | Paranaíba | 38 | Inocência | 8,404 | 5761 |
| Leste de Mato Grosso do Sul | Paranaíba | 57 | Paranaíba | 40,957 | 5352 |
| Leste de Mato Grosso do Sul | Paranaíba | 69 | Selvíria | 8,142 | 3254 |
| Leste de Mato Grosso do Sul | Três Lagoas | 1 | Água Clara | 16,741 | 7781 |
| Leste de Mato Grosso do Sul | Três Lagoas | 17 | Brasilândia | 11,579 | 5803 |
| Leste de Mato Grosso do Sul | Três Lagoas | 62 | Ribas do Rio Pardo | 23,150 | 17315 |
| Leste de Mato Grosso do Sul | Três Lagoas | 67 | Santa Rita do Pardo | 7,027 | 6142 |
| Leste de Mato Grosso do Sul | Três Lagoas | 76 | Três Lagoas | 132,152 | 10217 |
| Pantanal Sul Mato-Grossense | Aquidauana | 4 | Anastácio | 24,114 | 2913 |
| Pantanal Sul Mato-Grossense | Aquidauana | 9 | Aquidauana | 46,803 | 17087 |
| Pantanal Sul Mato-Grossense | Aquidauana | 30 | Dois Irmãos do Buriti | 11,100 | 2430 |
| Pantanal Sul Mato-Grossense | Aquidauana | 50 | Miranda | 25,536 | 5470 |
| Pantanal Sul Mato-Grossense | Baixo Pantanal | 26 | Corumbá | 96,268 | 64431 |
| Pantanal Sul Mato-Grossense | Baixo Pantanal | 47 | Ladário | 21,522 | 354 |
| Pantanal Sul Mato-Grossense | Baixo Pantanal | 61 | Porto Murtinho | 12,859 | 17502 |
| Sudoeste de Mato Grosso do Sul | Bodoquena | 14 | Bela Vista | 21,613 | 4956 |
| Sudoeste de Mato Grosso do Sul | Bodoquena | 15 | Bodoquena | 8,567 | 2589 |
| Sudoeste de Mato Grosso do Sul | Bodoquena | 16 | Bonito | 23,659 | 5378 |
| Sudoeste de Mato Grosso do Sul | Bodoquena | 21 | Caracol | 5,036 | 2928 |
| Sudoeste de Mato Grosso do Sul | Bodoquena | 36 | Guia Lopes da Laguna | 9,940 | 1225 |
| Sudoeste de Mato Grosso do Sul | Bodoquena | 44 | Jardim | 23,981 | 2130 |
| Sudoeste de Mato Grosso do Sul | Bodoquena | 53 | Nioaque | 13,220 | 3909 |
| Sudoeste de Mato Grosso do Sul | Dourados | 3 | Amambaí | 39,325 | 4193 |
| Sudoeste de Mato Grosso do Sul | Dourados | 7 | Antônio João | 9,303 | 1095 |
| Sudoeste de Mato Grosso do Sul | Dourados | 10 | Aral Moreira | 10,748 | 1653 |
| Sudoeste de Mato Grosso do Sul | Dourados | 18 | Caarapó | 30,612 | 2115 |
| Sudoeste de Mato Grosso do Sul | Dourados | 31 | Douradina | 5,578 | 280 |
| Sudoeste de Mato Grosso do Sul | Dourados | 32 | Dourados | 243,367 | 4062 |
| Sudoeste de Mato Grosso do Sul | Dourados | 34 | Fátima do Sul | 20,609 | 325 |
| Sudoeste de Mato Grosso do Sul | Dourados | 39 | Itaporã | 24,137 | 1342 |
| Sudoeste de Mato Grosso do Sul | Dourados | 46 | Juti | 6,729 | 1569 |
| Sudoeste de Mato Grosso do Sul | Dourados | 48 | Laguna Carapã | 6,799 | 1725 |
| Sudoeste de Mato Grosso do Sul | Dourados | 49 | Maracaju | 45,047 | 5396 |
| Sudoeste de Mato Grosso do Sul | Dourados | 54 | Nova Alvorada do Sul | 21,822 | 4027 |
| Sudoeste de Mato Grosso do Sul | Dourados | 60 | Ponta Porã | 92,017 | 5359 |
| Sudoeste de Mato Grosso do Sul | Dourados | 63 | Rio Brilhante | 37,601 | 3983 |
| Sudoeste de Mato Grosso do Sul | Dourados | 77 | Vicentina | 6,336 | 302 |
| Sudoeste de Mato Grosso do Sul | Iguatemi | 6 | Angélica | 10,729 | 1283 |
| Sudoeste de Mato Grosso do Sul | Iguatemi | 25 | Coronel Sapucaia | 14,289 | 1023 |
| Sudoeste de Mato Grosso do Sul | Iguatemi | 29 | Deodápolis | 13,663 | 828 |
| Sudoeste de Mato Grosso do Sul | Iguatemi | 33 | Eldorado | 11,386 | 1012 |
| Sudoeste de Mato Grosso do Sul | Iguatemi | 35 | Glória de Dourados | 10,444 | 493 |
| Sudoeste de Mato Grosso do Sul | Iguatemi | 37 | Iguatemi | 13,808 | 2957 |
| Sudoeste de Mato Grosso do Sul | Iguatemi | 40 | Itaquiraí | 19,423 | 2063 |
| Sudoeste de Mato Grosso do Sul | Iguatemi | 41 | Ivinhema | 27,821 | 2003 |
| Sudoeste de Mato Grosso do Sul | Iguatemi | 42 | Japorã | 8,148 | 416 |
| Sudoeste de Mato Grosso do Sul | Iguatemi | 45 | Jateí | 3,586 | 1933 |
| Sudoeste de Mato Grosso do Sul | Iguatemi | 51 | Mundo Novo | 19,193 | 478 |
| Sudoeste de Mato Grosso do Sul | Iguatemi | 52 | Naviraí | 50,457 | 3189 |
| Sudoeste de Mato Grosso do Sul | Iguatemi | 56 | Novo Horizonte do Sul | 4,721 | 849 |
| Sudoeste de Mato Grosso do Sul | Iguatemi | 58 | Paranhos | 12,921 | 1307 |
| Sudoeste de Mato Grosso do Sul | Iguatemi | 70 | Sete Quedas | 10,994 | 839 |
| Sudoeste de Mato Grosso do Sul | Iguatemi | 73 | Tacuru | 10,808 | 1784 |

Note:

^{*} - Figueirão was created on 2005, from parts of Costa Rica and Camapuã. Paraíso das Águas was created as a municipality on 1 January 2013, from parts of the municipalities of Água Clara, Costa Rica and Chapadão do Sul.

== See also ==
- Geography of Brazil
- List of cities in Brazil
