= Caracol, Mato Grosso do Sul =

Caracol
- Municipality
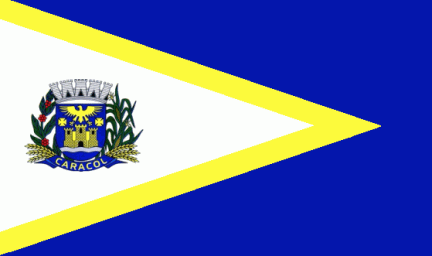
- Flag

- Location in Mato Grosso do Sul state

- Location in Brazil
- Coordinates: 22°00′50″S 57°01′26″W
- Country: Brazil
- Region: Central-West
- State: Mato Grosso do Sul

Area
  - Total: 2,939 km^{2} (1,135 sq mi)

Population (2020)
  - Total: 6,182
  - Density: 2.103/km^{2} (5.448/sq mi)
- Time zone: UTC−4 (AMT)

Caracol is a municipality located in the Brazilian state of Mato Grosso do Sul. Its population was 6,182 (2020) and its area is 2,939 km^{2}.
