= Japorã =

- Municipality
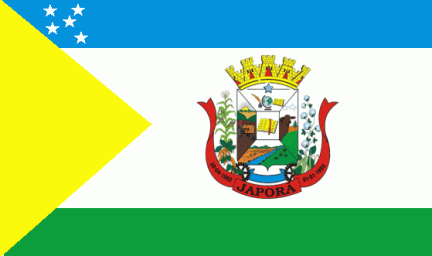
- Flag

- Location in Mato Grosso do Sul state

- Location in Brazil
- Coordinates: 23°53′27″S 54°24′14″W
- Country: Brazil
- Region: Central-West
- State: Mato Grosso do Sul

Area
  - Total: 420 km^{2} (160 sq mi)

Population (2020)
  - Total: 9,243
  - Density: 22/km^{2} (57/sq mi)
- Time zone: UTC−4 (AMT)

Japorã is a municipality located in the Brazilian state of Mato Grosso do Sul. Its population was 9,243 (2020) and its area is 420 km^{2}.
