= Itaquiraí =

- Municipality
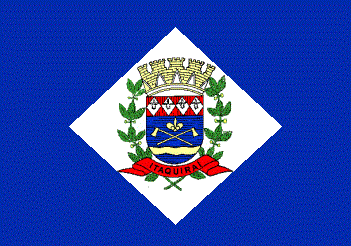
- Flag

- Location in Mato Grosso do Sul state

- Location in Brazil
- Coordinates: 23°28′26″S 54°11′06″W
- Country: Brazil
- Region: Central-West
- State: Mato Grosso do Sul

Area
  - Total: 2,064 km^{2} (797 sq mi)

Population (2020)
  - Total: 21,376
  - Density: 10.36/km^{2} (26.82/sq mi)
- Time zone: UTC−4 (AMT)

Itaquiraí is a municipality located in the Brazilian state of Mato Grosso do Sul. Its population was 21,376 (2020) and its area is 2,064 km^{2}.
