= Sete Quedas =

- Municipality
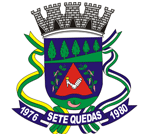
- Flag Coat of arms

- Location in Mato Grosso do Sul state

- Location in Brazil
- Coordinates: 23°58′12″S 55°02′09″W
- Country: Brazil
- Region: Central-West
- State: Mato Grosso do Sul

Area
  - Total: 826 km^{2} (319 sq mi)

Population (2020)
  - Total: 10,771
  - Density: 13.0/km^{2} (33.8/sq mi)
- Time zone: UTC−4 (AMT)

Sete Quedas is a municipality located in the Brazilian state of Mato Grosso do Sul. Its population was 10,771 (2020) and its area is 826 km^{2} (319 sq mi). It is where the music artist Ana Castela grew up.
