= Taquarussu, Mato Grosso do Sul =

Taquarussu
- Municipality
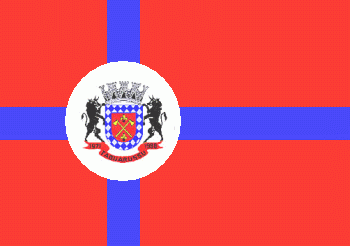
- Flag

- Location in Mato Grosso do Sul state

- Location in Brazil
- Coordinates: 22°29′16″S 53°21′03″W
- Country: Brazil
- Region: Central-West
- State: Mato Grosso do Sul

Area
  - Total: 1,041 km^{2} (402 sq mi)

Population (2020)
  - Total: 3,588
  - Density: 3.447/km^{2} (8.927/sq mi)
- Time zone: UTC−4 (AMT)

Taquarussu is a municipality located in the Brazilian state of Mato Grosso do Sul. Its population was 3,588 (2020) and its area is 1,041 km^{2} (402 sq mi).

The municipality contains 21% of the 73,345 hectares (181,240 acres) Rio Ivinhema State Park, created in 1998.
