= Cassilândia =

- Municipality
- The Municipality of Cassilândia
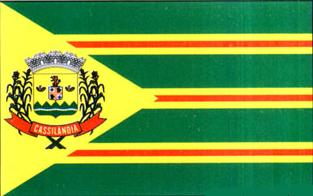
- Flag

- Location of Cassilândia
- Coordinates: 19°06′46″S 51°44′02″W
- Country: Brazil
- Region: Central-West
- State: Mato Grosso do Sul
- Established: 2009

Government
  - Mayor: José Donizete (PT)

Area
  - Total: 3,649.83 km^{2} (1,409.21 sq mi)
- Elevation: 470 m (1,540 ft)

Population (2020)
  - Total: 22,002
  - Density: 5.9/km^{2} (15/sq mi)
- Time zone: UTC−4 (AMT)
- Postal Code: 59540-000
- HDI (PNUD/2000): 0.775 – medium
- Website: Cassilândia, Mato Grosso do Sul

Cassilândia is a municipality located in the Brazilian state of Mato Grosso do Sul. Its population was 22,002 (2020) and its area is 3,650 km^{2}.
