= Laguna Carapã =

- Municipality
- Flag

- Location in Mato Grosso do Sul state

- Location in Brazil
- Coordinates: 22°32′45″S 55°09′00″W
- Country: Brazil
- Region: Central-West
- State: Mato Grosso do Sul

Area
  - Total: 1,734 km^{2} (670 sq mi)

Population (2020)
  - Total: 7,419
  - Density: 4.279/km^{2} (11.08/sq mi)
- Time zone: UTC−4 (AMT)

Laguna Carapã is a municipality located in the Brazilian state of Mato Grosso do Sul. Its population was 7,419 (2020) and its area is 1,734 km^{2}.

== Notable people ==
The footballer Juninho Cabral is from Laguna.
