= Novo Horizonte do Sul =

- Municipality
- Flag

- Location in Mato Grosso do Sul state

- Location in Brazil
- Coordinates: 22°40′08″S 53°51′36″W
- Country: Brazil
- Region: Central-West
- State: Mato Grosso do Sul

Area
  - Total: 849 km^{2} (328 sq mi)

Population (2020)
  - Total: 3,684
  - Density: 4.34/km^{2} (11.2/sq mi)
- Time zone: UTC−4 (AMT)

Novo Horizonte do Sul is a municipality located in the Brazilian state of Mato Grosso do Sul. Its population was 3,684 (2020) and its area is 849 km^{2}.
