= Santa Rita do Pardo =

- Municipality
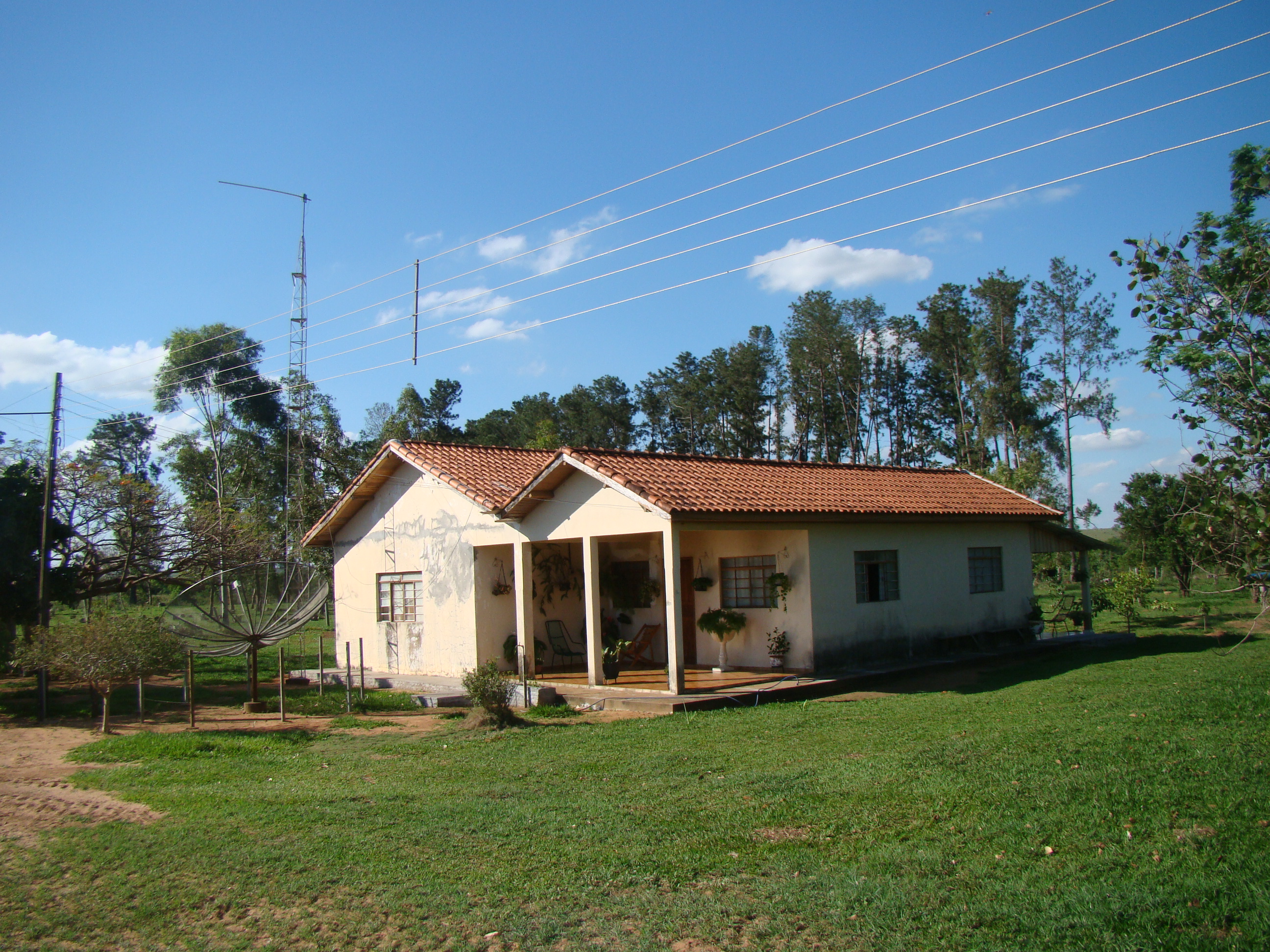

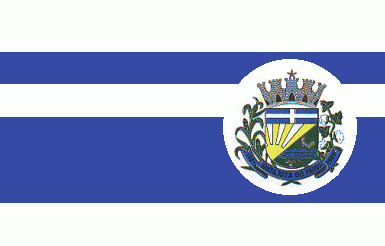
- Flag

- Location in Mato Grosso do Sul state

- Location in Brazil
- Coordinates: 21°18′10″S 52°49′51″W
- Country: Brazil
- Region: Central-West
- State: Mato Grosso do Sul

Population (2020)
  - Total: 7,900
- Time zone: UTC−4 (AMT)

Santa Rita do Pardo is a municipality located in the Brazilian state of Mato Grosso do Sul. Its population is 7,900 (2020) and its area is 6,142 km^{2} (2,371 sq mi).
