= Juti =

- Municipality
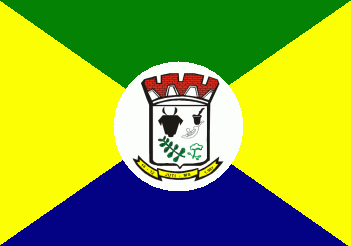
- Flag

- Location in Mato Grosso do Sul state

- Location in Brazil
- Coordinates: 22°51′39″S 54°36′10″W
- Country: Brazil
- Region: Central-West
- State: Mato Grosso do Sul

Area
  - Total: 1,585 km^{2} (612 sq mi)

Population (2020)
  - Total: 6,787
  - Density: 4.282/km^{2} (11.09/sq mi)
- Time zone: UTC−4 (AMT)

Juti is a municipality located in the Brazilian state of Mato Grosso do Sul. Its population was 6,787 (2020) and its area is 1,585 km^{2} (612 sq mi).
