= Inocência =

- Municipality
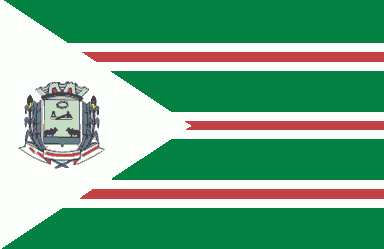
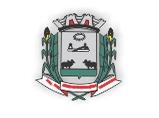
- Flag Coat of arms

- Location in Mato Grosso do Sul state

- Location in Brazil
- Coordinates: 19°43′33″S 51°55′48″W
- Country: Brazil
- Region: Central-West
- State: Mato Grosso do Sul

Area
  - Total: 5,776 km^{2} (2,230 sq mi)

Population (2020)
  - Total: 7,588
  - Density: 1.314/km^{2} (3.402/sq mi)
- Time zone: UTC−4 (AMT)

Inocência is a municipality located in the Brazilian state of Mato Grosso do Sul. As of 2020, its population was 7,588. It spans an area of 5,776 km^{2} (2,230 sq mi).
