= Aparecida do Taboado =

- Municipality
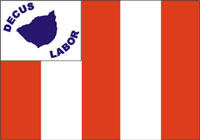
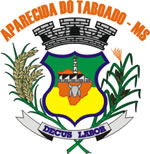
- Flag Coat of arms

- Location in Mato Grosso do Sul state

- Location in Brazil
- Coordinates: 20°05′13″S 51°05′38″W
- Country: Brazil
- Region: Central-West
- State: Mato Grosso do Sul

Population (2020)
  - Total: 26,069
- Time zone: UTC−4 (AMT)

Aparecida do Taboado is a municipality located in the Brazilian state of Mato Grosso do Sul. Its population was 26,069 (2020) and its area is 2,750 km^{2}.
