= Figueirão =

- Municipality
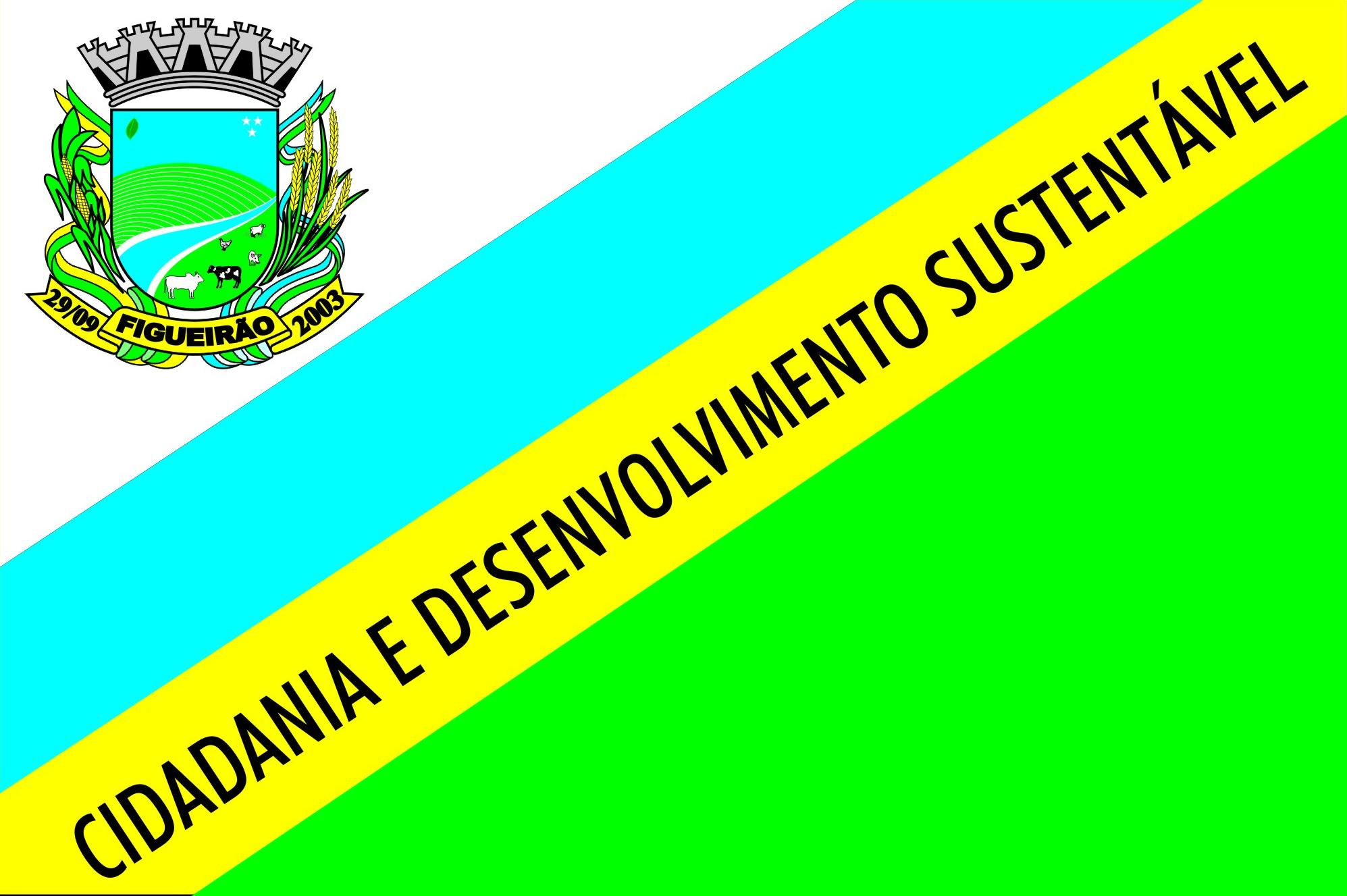
- Flag

- Location in Mato Grosso do Sul state

- Location in Brazil
- Coordinates: 18°40′46″S 53°38′18″W
- Country: Brazil
- Region: Central-West
- State: Mato Grosso do Sul
- Elevation: 396 m (1,299 ft)

Population (2020)
  - Total: 3,059
- Time zone: UTC−4 (AMT)

Figueirão is a municipality located in the Brazilian state of Mato Grosso do Sul. Its population was 3,059 (2020).
