= Jaraguari =

- Municipality
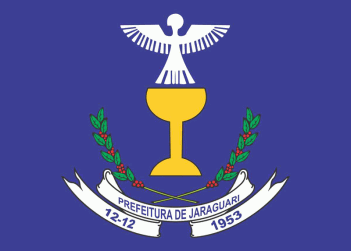
- Flag

- Location in Mato Grosso do Sul state

- Location in Brazil
- Coordinates: 20°08′31″S 54°23′56″W
- Country: Brazil
- Region: Central-West
- State: Mato Grosso do Sul

Area
  - Total: 2,913 km^{2} (1,125 sq mi)

Population (2021)
  - Total: 7,342
  - Density: 2.520/km^{2} (6.528/sq mi)
- Time zone: UTC−4 (AMT)

Jaraguari is a municipality located in the Brazilian state of Mato Grosso do Sul. Its population was 7,342 (2021) and its area is 2,913 km^{2} (1,125 sq mi).

== History ==
It was first settled by Brazilians in 1875 when Porfirio Alberto de Freitas, his wife, and his brother in-law settled into Jaraguari Velho (then called Fazenda Estiva). In January 1909, José Thomaz Barbosa would draw up the borders of the municipality. Later, de Freitas ordered the construction of a church. It was only completed in 1923. It had been named Senhor Divino Espírito Santo, and was destroyed in 1930. After that, Japanese settlers arrived and created a separate community. In 1953, Jaraguari was made a municipality. The name was derived from Araguari, the old hometown of de Freitas. A J was added because Jaragua means grass in Brazilian Portuguese.

== Deforestation ==
Jaraguari is largely covered by forests, but has suffered 1.5% forest lost in the past 20 years, with much of this picking up pace in the 2010s.
