= Nova Alvorada do Sul =

- Municipality
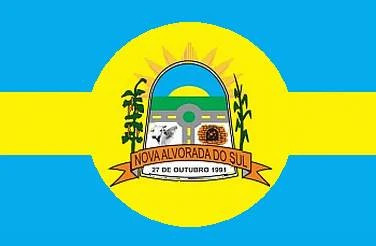
- Flag

- Location in Mato Grosso do Sul state

- Location in Brazil
- Coordinates: 21°27′57″S 54°23′02″W
- Country: Brazil
- Region: Central-West
- State: Mato Grosso do Sul

Area
  - Total: 4,019 km^{2} (1,552 sq mi)

Population (2020)
  - Total: 22,430
  - Density: 5.581/km^{2} (14.45/sq mi)
- Time zone: UTC−4 (AMT)

Nova Alvorada do Sul is a municipality located in the Brazilian state of Mato Grosso do Sul. Its population was 22,430 (2020) and its area is 4,019 km^{2} (1,552 sq mi).

== History ==
For many years Nova Alvorada do Sul was known as the "Entroncamento" (the junction) because it is located at the meeting point of several different transport routes and cultures.

Formally established as an independent municipality in 1993, the settlement was previously registered as a district of Rio Brilhante in 1976.

== Economy ==
The economy is closely tied to the sugar cane based industries, with sugar based Ethanol plants operated by firms including Grupo Safi, Eldorado, Lous Dreyfus and Tavares de Melo. The rich agriculture of the surrounding area also supports an important food processing industry in the town.
