= Aral Moreira =

- Municipality
- Flag Coat of arms

- Location in Mato Grosso do Sul state

- Location in Brazil
- Coordinates: 22°56′02″S 55°38′06″W
- Country: Brazil
- Region: Central-West
- State: Mato Grosso do Sul

Area
  - Total: 1,656 km^{2} (639 sq mi)

Population (2020)
  - Total: 12,332
  - Density: 7.447/km^{2} (19.29/sq mi)
- Time zone: UTC−4 (AMT)

Aral Moreira is a municipality located in the Brazilian state of Mato Grosso do Sul. Its population was 12,332 (2020) and its area is 1,656 km^{2} (639 sq mi).
