= Paranhos, Mato Grosso do Sul =

Paranhos
- Municipality
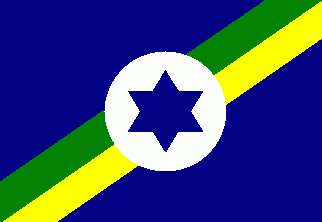
- Flag

- Location in Mato Grosso do Sul state

- Location in Brazil
- Coordinates: 23°53′34″S 55°25′51″W
- Country: Brazil
- Region: Central-West
- State: Mato Grosso do Sul

Area
  - Total: 1,302 km^{2} (503 sq mi)

Population (2020)
  - Total: 14,404
  - Density: 11.06/km^{2} (28.65/sq mi)
- Time zone: UTC−4 (AMT)

Paranhos is a municipality located in the Brazilian state of Mato Grosso do Sul. Its population was 14,404 (2020) and its area is 1,302 km^{2}. It is known for having registered snowfalls at least two times (in 1975 and 2013), an extremely rare phenomenon in Brazil outside the regions of South and Southeast.
