= Paranaíba =

- Municipality
- The Municipality of Paranaíba
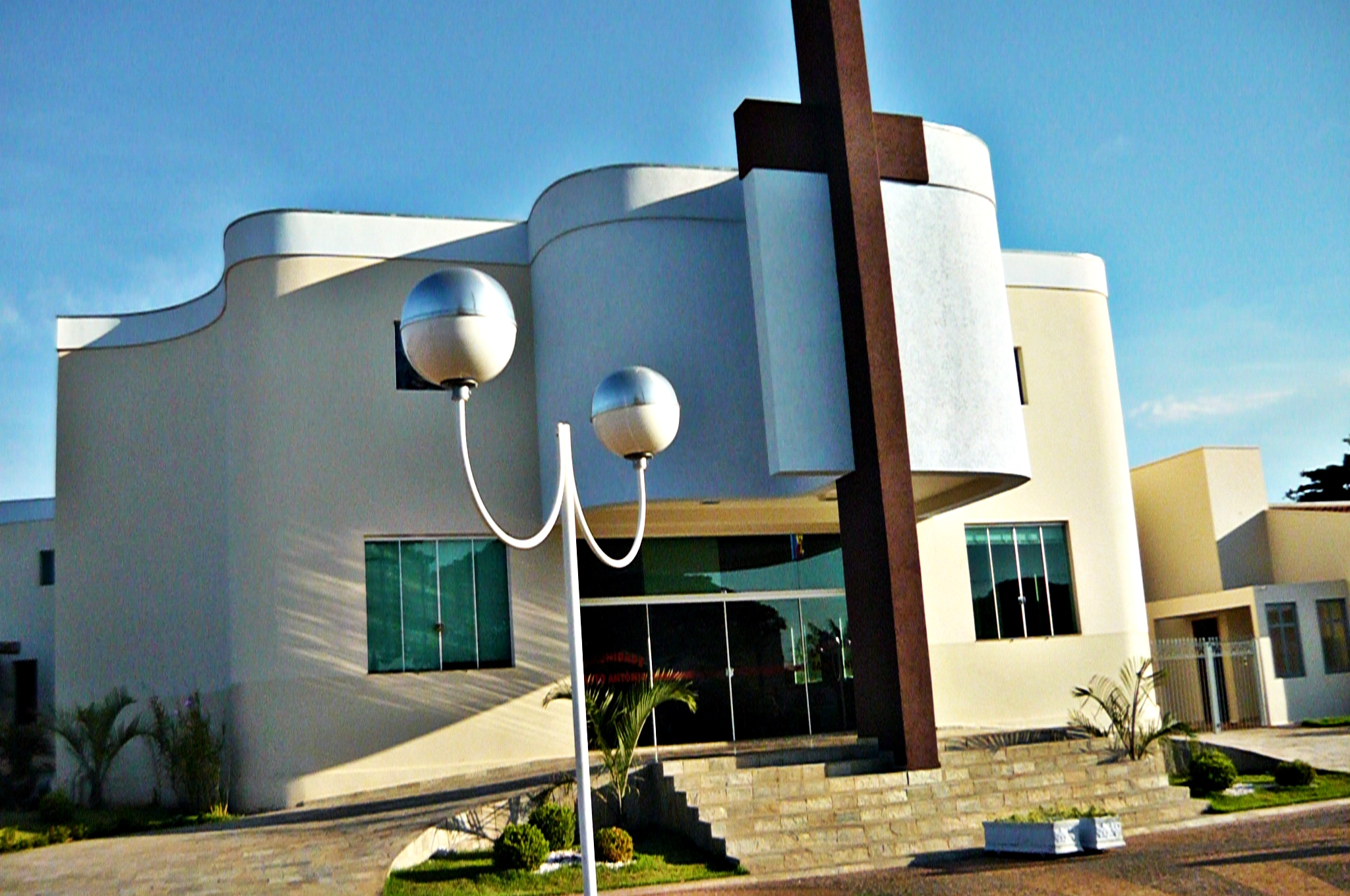

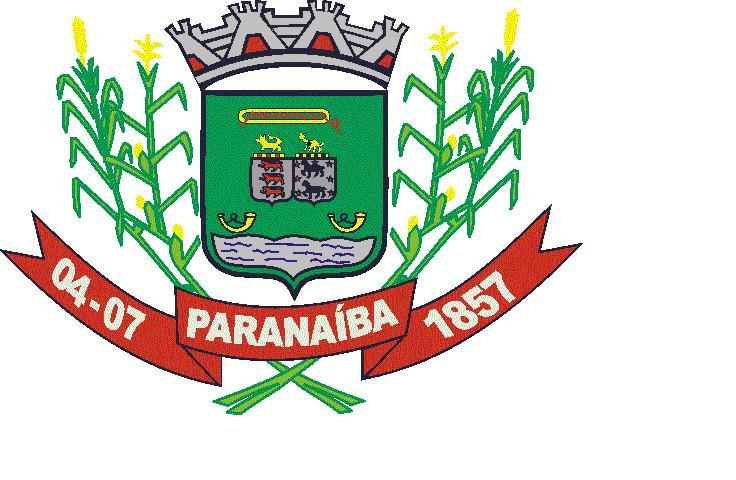
- Flag Coat of arms

- Location of Paranaíba
- Coordinates: 19°40′37″S 51°11′27″W
- Country: Brazil
- Region: Central-West
- State: Mato Grosso do Sul
- Founded: April 19, 1838

Government
  - Mayor: José Garcia de Freitas (Zé Braquiara) (PDT)

Area
  - Total: 5,402.778 km^{2} (2,086.024 sq mi)
- Elevation: 374 m (1,227 ft)

Population (2020)
  - Total: 42,276
  - Density: 7.16/km^{2} (18.5/sq mi)
- Time zone: UTC−4 (AMT)
- HDI (2000): 0.772 – medium
- Website: www.paranaiba.ms.gov.br/

Paranaíba is the easternmost municipality in the Brazilian state of Mato Grosso do Sul. Its population was 42,276 (2020) and its area is 5,402.778 km^{2}.

== Geography ==
=== Climate ===
Climate data for Paranaíba (1981–2010)
Month	Jan	Feb	Mar	Apr	May	Jun	Jul	Aug	Sep	Oct	Nov	Dec	Year
Mean daily maximum °C (°F)	31.5 (88.7)	31.9 (89.4)	31.6 (88.9)	31.1 (88.0)	28.6 (83.5)	28.2 (82.8)	29.1 (84.4)	31.5 (88.7)	32.2 (90.0)	32.8 (91.0)	32.2 (90.0)	31.7 (89.1)	31.0 (87.8)
Daily mean °C (°F)	25.7 (78.3)	25.9 (78.6)	25.7 (78.3)	24.8 (76.6)	21.7 (71.1)	20.9 (69.6)	21.2 (70.2)	23.3 (73.9)	24.8 (76.6)	26.1 (79.0)	26.0 (78.8)	25.8 (78.4)	24.3 (75.7)
Mean daily minimum °C (°F)	21.6 (70.9)	21.6 (70.9)	21.3 (70.3)	19.7 (67.5)	16.0 (60.8)	14.8 (58.6)	14.4 (57.9)	16.3 (61.3)	18.8 (65.8)	20.8 (69.4)	21.1 (70.0)	21.4 (70.5)	19.0 (66.2)
Average precipitation mm (inches)	304.6 (11.99)	185.4 (7.30)	196.7 (7.74)	72.0 (2.83)	48.6 (1.91)	22.2 (0.87)	14.3 (0.56)	15.5 (0.61)	58.4 (2.30)	105.5 (4.15)	141.6 (5.57)	241.4 (9.50)	1,406.2 (55.36)
Average precipitation days (≥ 1.0 mm)	18	12	12	5	4	2	2	2	6	8	11	16	98
Average relative humidity (%)	77.6	75.8	76.0	70.4	68.1	64.8	56.5	51.0	56.4	61.5	67.5	73.8	66.6
Mean monthly sunshine hours	191.3	199.8	223.0	242.3	228.8	214.9	242.8	255.0	210.7	223.4	226.3	204.6	2,662.9
Source: Instituto Nacional de Meteorologia
