= Rochedo =

- Municipality
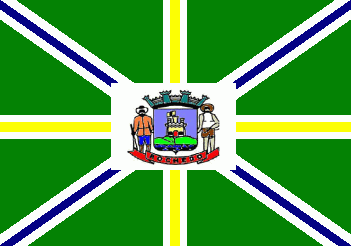
- Flag

- Location in Mato Grosso do Sul state

- Location in Brazil
- Coordinates: 19°57′10″S 54°53′34″W
- Country: Brazil
- Region: Central-West
- State: Mato Grosso do Sul

Area
  - Total: 1,561 km^{2} (603 sq mi)

Population (2020)
  - Total: 5,079
  - Density: 3.254/km^{2} (8.427/sq mi)
- Time zone: UTC−4 (AMT)

Rochedo is a municipality located in the Brazilian state of Mato Grosso do Sul. Its population was 5,079 (2020) and its area is 1,561 km^{2} (603 sq mi).
