= Tacuru =

Tacuru Takuru (Guarani)
- Flag

- Location within Brazil
- Coordinates: 23°37′58″S 55°00′57″W
- Country: Brazil
- Region: Southeast
- State: Mato Grosso do Sul
- Mesoregion: Sudoeste de Mato Grosso do Sul
- Microregion: Iguatemi

Government
  - Mayor: Rogério Torquetti (PSDB)

Population (2020)
  - Total: 11,674

Tacuru (Guarani: Takuru) is a city in the Brazilian state of Mato Grosso do Sul, located in the Midwest region of the country. The city is located on the border with Paraguay. Tacuru, which uses Guarani as an official language alongside Portuguese, is one of the few cities in Brazil that have adopted an indigenous language as an official language.

== History ==
In 2010, the city adopted Guarani as its official language, along with Portuguese. In doing so, it became the second city in the country, after São Gabriel da Cachoeira, Amazonas, to adopt an indigenous language as an official language.

In 2013, Tacuru became the site of a large popular demonstration against proposed demarcations of Indigenous lands.

== Geography ==
Tacaru is located 427 km from the state capital (Campo Grande) and 1,442 km from the federal capital (Brasília). The city is connected with Igautemi through the MS-295 regional highway.

=== Jaguapiré indigenous territory ===
The indigenous territory of Jaguapiré, which comprises 2,089 hectares, was first recognized by the federal government in 1992 as the territory for the Guarani-Kaiowá.

== Demographics ==
=== Race ===
Racial demographics of Tacuru (2022)
Race	Percentage	Population
Indigenous	38.91%	4,205
Pardo	29.91%	3,233
White	27.73%	2,997
Black	3.7%	367
Asian	0.06%	6

=== Religion ===
Religious demographics of Tacuru (2022)
Race	Percentage
Roman Catholic	55.9%
Evangelicalism	30.39%
No religion	11.38%
Other religion	2.05%
Umbanda / Candomblé	0.11%
Spiritism	0.1%
Indigenous religions	0.06%

== Politics and government ==
=== Federal elections ===
In the second round of the 2022 Brazilian general election, Luiz Inácio Lula da Silva received 64.06% of the vote versus incumbent president Jair Bolsonaro, who received 35.94%.

=== Municipal government ===
In the 2024 municipal elections, Rogério Torquetti (PSDB) was elected mayor.

Parties of elected mayors since 2000
Year of election	Party of elected mayor
2000	PT
2004	PV
2008	PR
2012	Democrats
2016	PMDB
2020	Patriota
2024	PSDB

== See also ==
- List of municipalities in Mato Grosso do Sul
