= Anastácio =

- Municipality
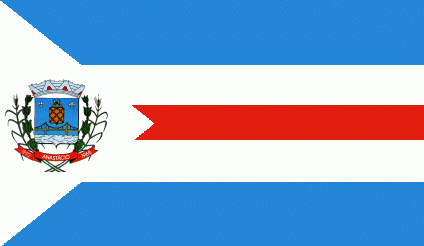
- Flag

- Location in Mato Grosso do Sul state

- Location in Brazil
- Coordinates: 20°29′02″S 55°48′25″W
- Country: Brazil
- Region: Central-West
- State: Mato Grosso do Sul

Area
  - Total: 2,949 km^{2} (1,139 sq mi)

Population (2025)
  - Total: 25,237
  - Density: 8.558/km^{2} (22.16/sq mi)
- Time zone: UTC−4 (AMT)

Anastácio is a municipality located in the Brazilian state of Mato Grosso do Sul. Its population was 25,237 (2025) and its area is 2,949 km^{2}.
