= Coronel Sapucaia =

Coordinates: 23°16′19″S 55°31′44″W

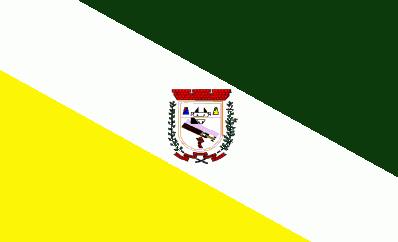
Flag of Coronel Spucaia

Coronel Sapucaia is a municipality located in the Brazilian state of Mato Grosso do Sul. Its population was 15,352 (2020) and its area is 1,024 km^{2} (395 sq mi).

== See also ==
- List of municipalities in Mato Grosso do Sul
