= Selvíria =

- Municipality
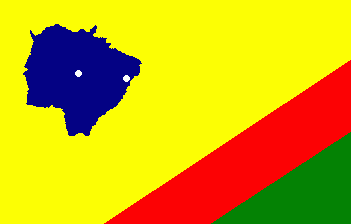
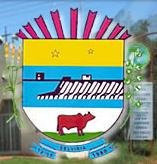
- Flag Coat of arms

- Location in Mato Grosso do Sul state

- Location in Brazil
- Coordinates: 20°22′01″S 51°25′08″W
- Country: Brazil
- Region: Central-West
- State: Mato Grosso do Sul

Area
  - Total: 3,259 km^{2} (1,258 sq mi)
- Elevation: 357 m (1,171 ft)

Population (2020)
  - Total: 6,542
  - Density: 2.007/km^{2} (5.199/sq mi)
- Time zone: UTC−4 (AMT)

Selvíria is a municipality located in the Brazilian state of Mato Grosso do Sul. Its population was 6,542 (2020) and its area is 3,259 km^{2} (1,258 sq mi).
