= Angélica, Mato Grosso do Sul =

Coordinates: 22°09′10″S 53°46′15″W

Angélica is a municipality located in the Brazilian state of Mato Grosso do Sul. Its population was 10,932 (2020) and its area is 1,283 km^{2} (495 sq mi).

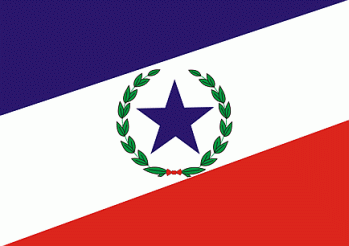
flag

== See also ==
- List of municipalities in Mato Grosso do Sul
