= Bodoquena =

Coordinates: 20°32′20″S 56°42′54″W

Município de Bodoquena
- Municipality
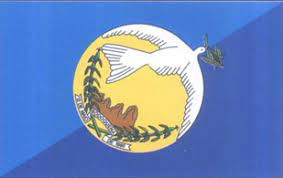
- Flag
- Nickname: Cidade serrana
- Location in Brazil
- Country: Brazil
- Region: Center-West
- State: Mato Grosso do Sul
- Founded: May 13, 1980

Government
  - Mayor: Umberto Machado Araripe (PTB)

Area
  - Total: 2.507 km^{2} (0.968 sq mi)
- Elevation: 132 m (433 ft)

Population (2020)
  - Total: 7,838
  - Density: 3.4/km^{2} (8.8/sq mi)
- Time zone: UTC−4 (AMT)
- HDI (2000): 0.708 – medium

Bodoquena is a municipality located in the Brazilian state of Mato Grosso do Sul. Its population was 7,838 (2020) and its area is 2,507 km^{2}.
