= Iguatemi =

- Municipality
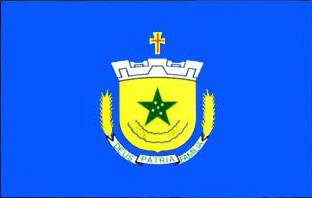
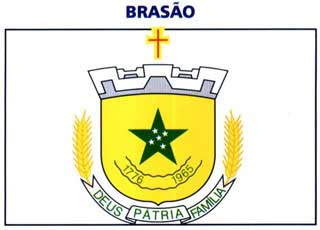
- Flag Coat of arms

- Location in Mato Grosso do Sul state

- Location in Brazil
- Coordinates: 23°40′48″S 54°33′39″W
- Country: Brazil
- Region: Central-West
- State: Mato Grosso do Sul

Area
  - Total: 2,947 km^{2} (1,138 sq mi)

Population (2020)
  - Total: 16,176
  - Density: 5.489/km^{2} (14.22/sq mi)
- Time zone: UTC−4 (AMT)

Iguatemi is a municipality located in the Brazilian state of Mato Grosso do Sul. Its population was 16,176 (2020) and its area is 2,947 km^{2}.

== Transportation ==
The city is connected with Tacuru through the MS-295 regional highway.
