= Eldorado, Mato Grosso do Sul =

Eldorado
- Municipality
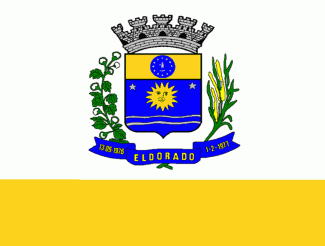
- Flag

- Location in Mato Grosso do Sul state

- Location in Brazil
- Coordinates: 23°47′13″S 54°17′02″W
- Country: Brazil
- Region: Central-West
- State: Mato Grosso do Sul

Area
  - Total: 1,018 km^{2} (393 sq mi)

Population (2020)
  - Total: 12,400
  - Density: 12.2/km^{2} (31.5/sq mi)
- Time zone: UTC−4 (AMT)

Eldorado is a municipality located in the Brazilian state of Mato Grosso do Sul. Its population was 12,400 (2020) and its area is 1,018 km^{2}.
