= Rio Verde de Mato Grosso =

- Municipality
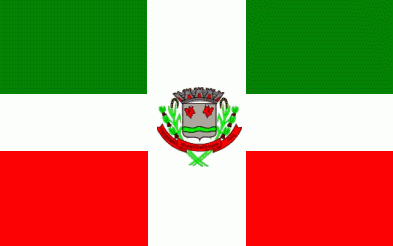
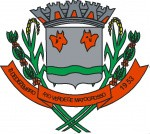
- Flag Coat of arms

- Location in Mato Grosso do Sul state

- Location in Brazil
- Coordinates: 18°55′04″S 54°50′38″W
- Country: Brazil
- Region: Central-West
- State: Mato Grosso do Sul

Area
  - Total: 8,152 km^{2} (3,148 sq mi)
- Elevation: 330 m (1,080 ft)

Population (2020)
  - Total: 19,973
  - Density: 2.450/km^{2} (6.346/sq mi)
- Time zone: UTC−4 (AMT)

Rio Verde de Mato Grosso is a municipality located in the Brazilian state of Mato Grosso do Sul. Its population was 19,973 (2020) and its area is 8,152 km^{2} (3,148 sq mi).

Rio Verde (which means "Green River" in English), how it's popularly called among the people from northern Mato Grosso do Sul, is a small town in the very edge of Serra da Alegria (which means "The Happiness Mountains"), close to the Pantanal of Nhecolândia (which means "The Blissful Burg"), one of the largest on earth. The following closest city is Coxim, an alternative center for backpackers and ecotourists from all over the world. Some of Rio Verde's great attractions are the Sete Quedas (Seven Falls), the Fazenda Igrejinha (Little Church Ranch) and the Jardim dos Tamanudás (Anteaters' Garden).
