= Jateí =

- Municipality
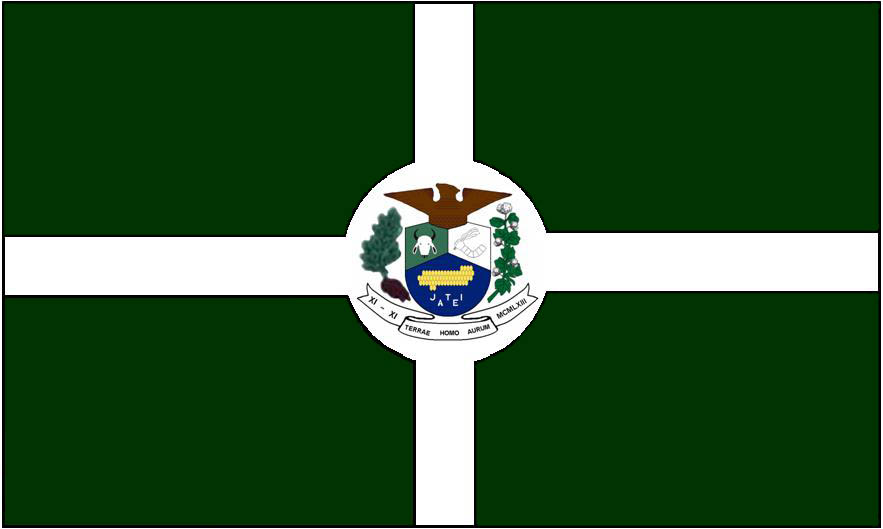
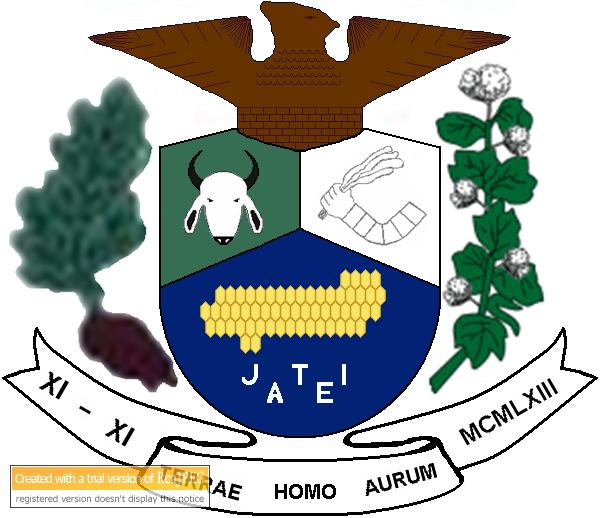
- Flag Coat of arms

- Location in Mato Grosso do Sul state

- Location in Brazil
- Coordinates: 22°28′55″S 54°18′10″W
- Country: Brazil
- Region: Central-West
- State: Mato Grosso do Sul

Area
  - Total: 1,928 km^{2} (744 sq mi)

Population (2020)
  - Total: 4,021
  - Density: 2.086/km^{2} (5.402/sq mi)
- Time zone: UTC−4 (AMT)

Jateí is a municipality located in the Brazilian state of Mato Grosso do Sul. Its population was 4,021 (2020) and its area is 1,928 km^{2} (744 sq mi).

The municipality contains 57% of the 73,345-hectare (181,240-acre) Rio Ivinhema State Park, created in 1998.

== Notable people ==
- Mert Nobre professional footballer
