= Dois Irmãos do Buriti =

- Municipality
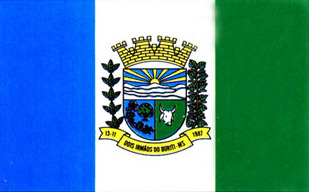
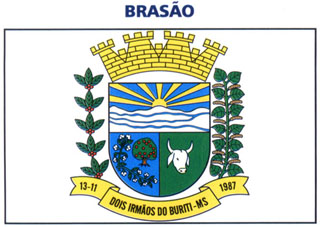
- Flag Coat of arms

- Location in Mato Grosso do Sul state

- Location in Brazil
- Coordinates: 20°40′48″S 55°17′45″W
- Country: Brazil
- Region: Central-West
- State: Mato Grosso do Sul

Area
  - Total: 2,345 km^{2} (905 sq mi)

Population (2020)
  - Total: 11,467
  - Density: 4.890/km^{2} (12.66/sq mi)
- Time zone: UTC−4 (AMT)

Dois Irmãos do Buriti is a municipality located in the Brazilian state of Mato Grosso do Sul. Its population was 11,467 (2020) and its area is 2,345 km^{2}.
