= Paraíso das Águas =

- Municipality
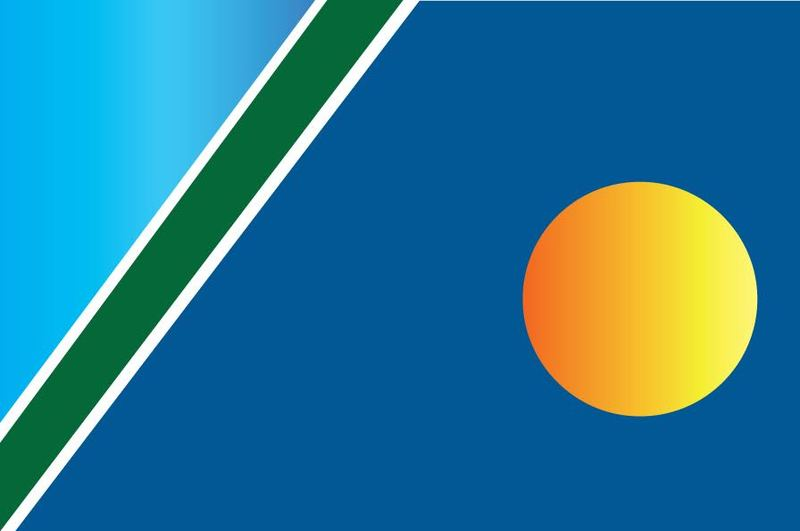
- Flag

- Location in Brazil
- Coordinates: 19°3′8″S 52°58′6″W
- Country: Brazil
- Region: Central-West
- State: Mato Grosso do Sul

Area
  - Total: 5,032 km^{2} (1,943 sq mi)

Population (2020)
  - Total: 5,654
  - Density: 1.124/km^{2} (2.910/sq mi)
- Time zone: UTC−4 (AMT)

Paraíso das Águas is a municipality located in the Brazilian state of Mato Grosso do Sul. Its population was 5,654 (2020) and its area is 5,032 km^{2} (1,943 sq mi). The municipality was established in January 2013.
