= Mundo Novo, Mato Grosso do Sul =

Mundo Novo
- Municipality
- The Municipality of Mundo Novo
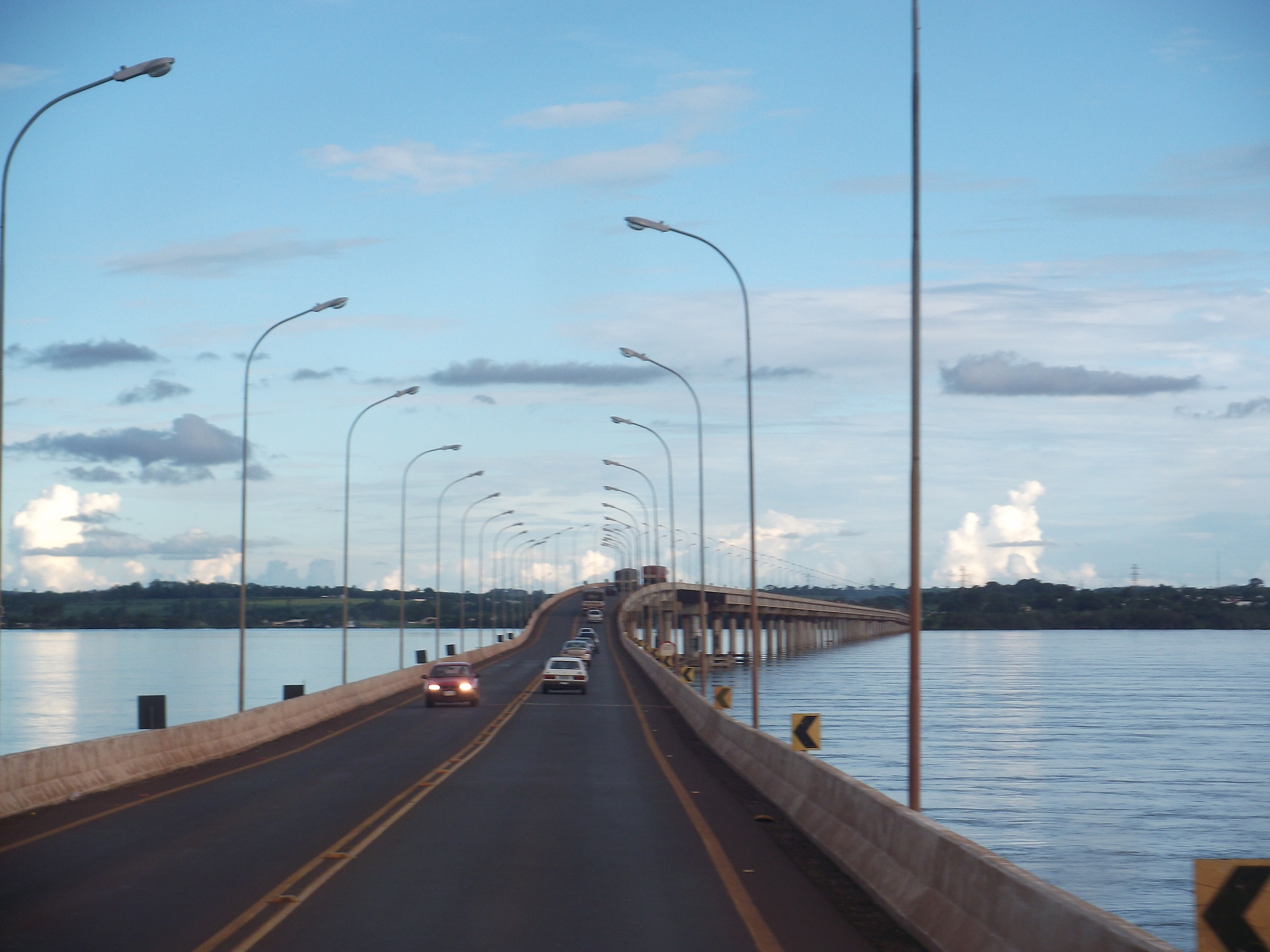
- Bridge over the Paraná river to Paraguay

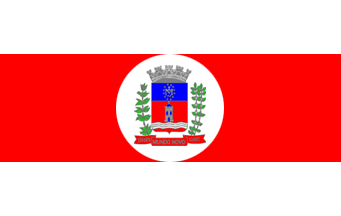
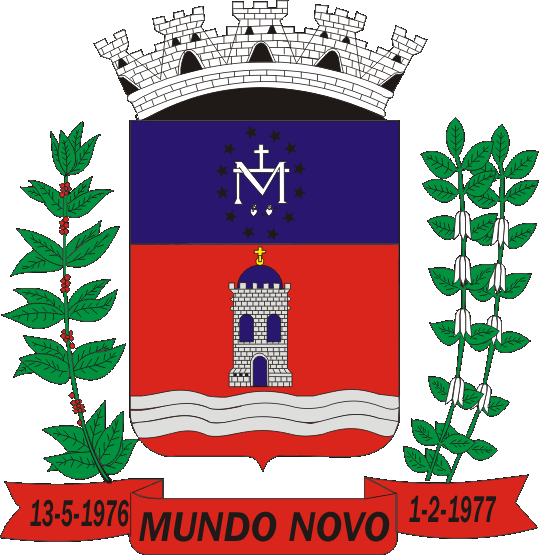
- Flag Coat of arms

- Location of Mundo Novo
- Coordinates: 23°56′16″S 54°16′15″W
- Country: Brazil
- Region: Central-West
- State: Mato Grosso do Sul
- Founded: May 13, 1973

Government
  - Mayor: Antonio Cavalcante

Area
  - Total: 479.327 km^{2} (185.069 sq mi)
- Elevation: 324 m (1,063 ft)

Population (2020)
  - Total: 18,473
  - Density: 29.2/km^{2} (76/sq mi)
- Time zone: UTC−4 (AMT)
- HDI (2000): 0.761 – medium
- Website: www.mundonovo.ms.gov.br/

Mundo Novo is the southernmost municipality in the Brazilian state of Mato Grosso do Sul. Its population was 18,473 (2020) and its area is 479.327 km^{2}.

It is situated on the frontier to Paraguay, opposite of Saltos del Guairá and the Paraná river.
