= Corguinho =

- Municipality
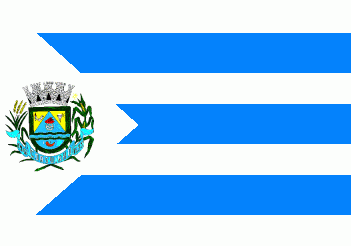
- Flag

- Location in Mato Grosso do Sul state

- Location in Brazil
- Coordinates: 19°49′55″S 54°49′44″W
- Country: Brazil
- Region: Central-West
- State: Mato Grosso do Sul

Area
  - Total: 2,641 km^{2} (1,020 sq mi)
- Elevation: 320 m (1,050 ft)

Population (2020)
  - Total: 6,054
  - Density: 2.292/km^{2} (5.937/sq mi)
- Time zone: UTC−4 (AMT)

Corguinho is a municipality located in the Brazilian state of Mato Grosso do Sul. Its population was 6,054 (2020) and its area is 2,641 km^{2}.
