= Porto Murtinho =

- Municipality
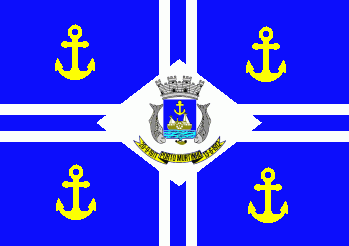
- Flag

- Location in Mato Grosso do Sul state

- Location in Brazil
- Coordinates: 21°41′56″S 57°52′58″W
- Country: Brazil
- Region: Central-West
- State: Mato Grosso do Sul

Area
  - Total: 17,735 km^{2} (6,848 sq mi)

Population (2020)
  - Total: 17,298
  - Density: 0.97536/km^{2} (2.5262/sq mi)
- Time zone: UTC−4 (AMT)

Porto Murtinho (Portuguese pronunciation: [ˈpoʁtu muʁˈtʃiɲu]) is a municipality located in the Brazilian state of Mato Grosso do Sul. Its population was 17,298 (2020) and its area is 17,735 km^{2} (6,848 sq mi).

== Climate ==
On 15 November 2023, a maximum temperature of 43.0 °C (109.4 °F) was registered in Porto Murtinho.

== Consular representation ==
Paraguay has a Consulate in Porto Murtinho.
