= Sidrolândia =

- Municipality
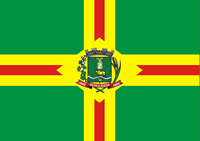
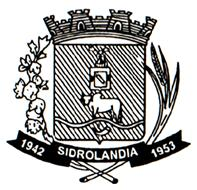
- Flag Coat of arms

- Location in Mato Grosso do Sul state

- Location in Brazil
- Coordinates: 20°55′55″S 54°57′39″W
- Country: Brazil
- Region: Central-West
- State: Mato Grosso do Sul

Area
  - Total: 5,286 km^{2} (2,041 sq mi)

Population (2020)
  - Total: 59,245
  - Density: 11.21/km^{2} (29.03/sq mi)
- Time zone: UTC−4 (AMT)

Sidrolândia is a municipality located in the Brazilian state of Mato Grosso do Sul. Its population was 59,245 (2020) and its area is 5,286 km^{2} (2,041 sq mi).

== Buriti farm ==
On 15 May 2013, a group of hundreds of Terena people re-occupied a parcel of land in Sidrolândia, now owned by a local politician and rancher, that they believe is part of their Indigenous ancestral territory. After two weeks of occupation, they were forcibly evicted from the Buriti farm on May 30 by local police. One of their members, 35-year-old Osiel Gabriel, was shot and killed by police during the eviction, and three others were injured. The Terena managed to regain control of the land on 1 June.
