= Fátima do Sul =

- Municipality
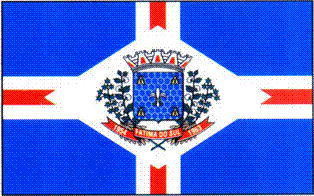
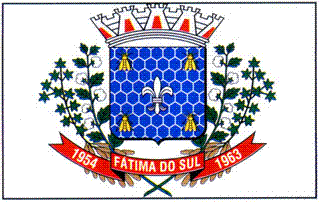
- Flag Coat of arms

- Location in Mato Grosso do Sul state

- Location in Brazil
- Coordinates: 22°22′26″S 54°30′50″W
- Country: Brazil
- Region: Central-West
- State: Mato Grosso do Sul

Area
  - Total: 315 km^{2} (122 sq mi)

Population (2020)
  - Total: 19,170
  - Density: 60.9/km^{2} (158/sq mi)
- Time zone: UTC−4 (AMT)

Fátima do Sul is a municipality located in the Brazilian state of Mato Grosso do Sul. Its population was 19,170 (2020) and its area is 315 km^{2}.
