= Amambai =

- Municipality
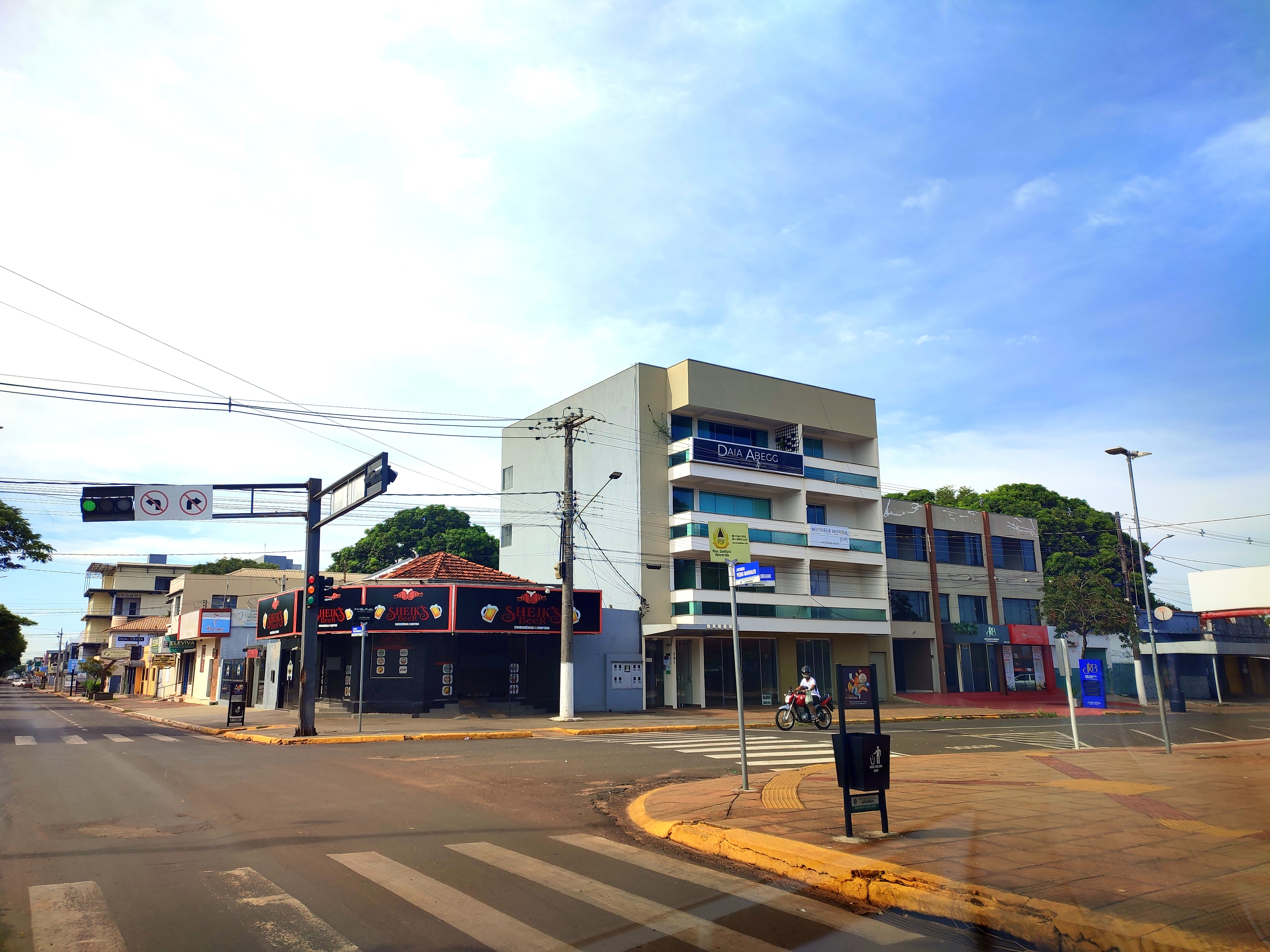

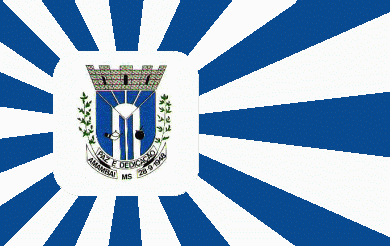
- Flag

- Location in Mato Grosso do Sul state

- Location in Brazil
- Coordinates: 23°06′14″S 55°13′33″W
- Country: Brazil
- Region: Central-West
- State: Mato Grosso do Sul

Area
  - Total: 4,202 km^{2} (1,622 sq mi)

Population (2020)
  - Total: 39,826
  - Density: 9.478/km^{2} (24.55/sq mi)
- Time zone: UTC−4 (AMT)

Amambai is a municipality located in the Brazilian state of Mato Grosso do Sul. Its population was 39,826 (2020) and its area is 4,202 km^{2}.

== Notourious Citizens ==
Ana Castela, singer-songwriter
