= São Gabriel do Oeste =

- Municipality
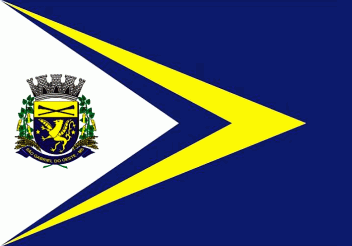
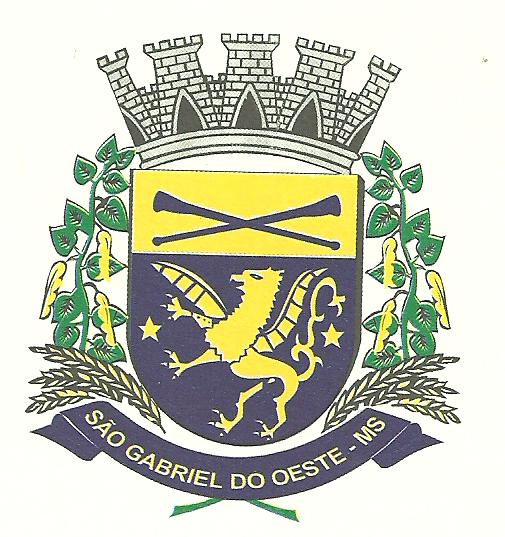
- Flag Coat of arms

- Location in Mato Grosso do Sul state

- Location in Brazil
- Coordinates: 19°23′42″S 54°33′57″W
- Country: Brazil
- Region: Central-West
- State: Mato Grosso do Sul

Area
  - Total: 3,865 km^{2} (1,492 sq mi)
- Elevation: 658 m (2,159 ft)

Population (2020)
  - Total: 27,221
  - Density: 7.043/km^{2} (18.24/sq mi)
- Time zone: UTC−4 (AMT)

São Gabriel do Oeste is a municipality located in the Brazilian state of Mato Grosso do Sul. Its population was 27,221 (2020) and its area is 3,865 km^{2}.
