= Deodápolis =

- Municipality
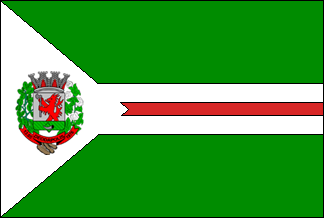
- Flag

- Location in Mato Grosso do Sul state

- Location in Brazil
- Coordinates: 22°16′33″S 54°09′54″W
- Country: Brazil
- Region: Central-West
- State: Mato Grosso do Sul

Area
  - Total: 831 km^{2} (321 sq mi)

Population (2020)
  - Total: 12,984
  - Density: 15.6/km^{2} (40.5/sq mi)
- Time zone: UTC−4 (AMT)

Deodápolis is a municipality located in the Brazilian state of Mato Grosso do Sul. Its population was 12,984 (2020) and its area is 831 km^{2}.
