= Camapuã =

- Municipality
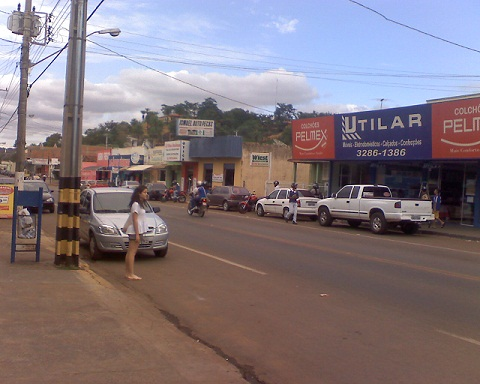
- View of Camapuã

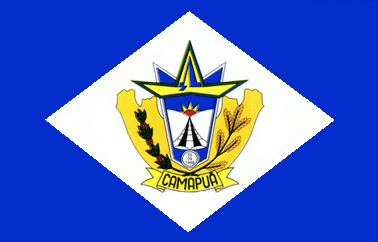
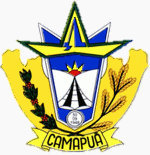
- Flag Coat of arms

- Location in Mato Grosso do Sul state

- Location in Brazil
- Coordinates: 19°31′51″S 54°02′38″W
- Country: Brazil
- Region: Central-West
- State: Mato Grosso do Sul

Area
  - Total: 10,758 km^{2} (4,154 sq mi)
- Elevation: 409 m (1,342 ft)

Population (2020)
  - Total: 13,693
  - Density: 1.2728/km^{2} (3.2966/sq mi)
- Time zone: UTC−4 (AMT)

Camapuã is a municipality located in the Brazilian state of Mato Grosso do Sul. Its population was 13,693 (2020) and its area is 10,758 km^{2}.
