= Ribas do Rio Pardo =

- Municipality
- Flag Coat of arms

- Location in Mato Grosso do Sul state

- Location in Brazil
- Coordinates: 20°26′34″S 53°45′32″W
- Country: Brazil
- Region: Central-West
- State: Mato Grosso do Sul

Area
  - Total: 17,309 km^{2} (6,683 sq mi)

Population (2020)
  - Total: 24,966
  - Density: 1.4424/km^{2} (3.7357/sq mi)
- Time zone: UTC−4 (AMT)

Ribas do Rio Pardo is a municipality located in the Brazilian state of Mato Grosso do Sul. Its population was 24,966 (2020) and its area is 17,309 km^{2}.
