= Douradina, Mato Grosso do Sul =

Douradina
- Municipality
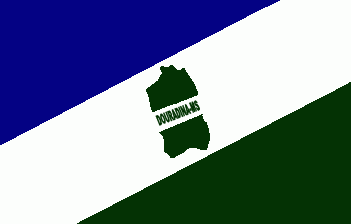
- Flag

- Location in Mato Grosso do Sul and Brazil
- Coordinates: 22°2′24″S 54°34′46″W
- Country: Brazil
- State: Mato Grosso do Sul
- Region: Center-West
- Microregion: Dourados

Government
  - Mayor: Nair Branti

Area
  - Total: 281 km^{2} (108 sq mi)
- Elevation: 553 m (1,814 ft)

Population (2020)
  - Total: 5,975
  - Density: 21.3/km^{2} (55.1/sq mi)
- Time zone: UTC−4 (AMT)
- Area code: +55 67
- Website: www.douradina.ms.gov.br

Douradina is a municipality located in the Brazilian state of Mato Grosso do Sul. Its population was 5,975 (2020) and its area is 281 km^{2}, which makes it the smallest municipality in the state.
