= Pedro Gomes =

- Municipality
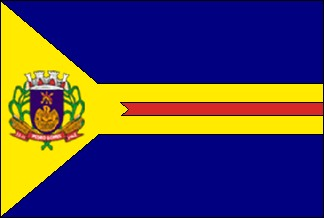
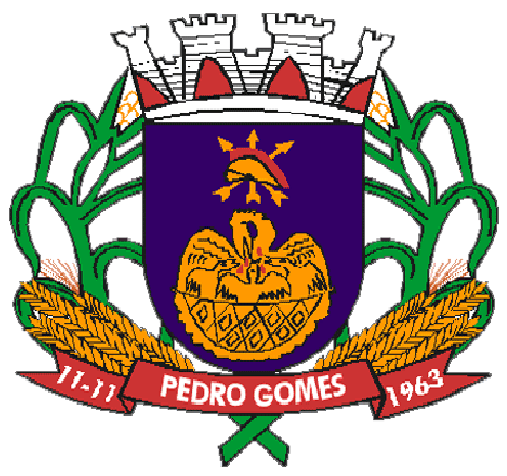
- Flag Coat of arms

- Location in Mato Grosso do Sul state

- Location in Brazil
- Coordinates: 18°06′03″S 54°33′07″W
- Country: Brazil
- Region: Central-West
- State: Mato Grosso do Sul

Area
  - Total: 3,651 km^{2} (1,410 sq mi)
- Elevation: 282 m (925 ft)

Population (2020)
  - Total: 7,621
  - Density: 2.087/km^{2} (5.406/sq mi)
- Time zone: UTC−4 (AMT)

Pedro Gomes is a municipality located in the Brazilian state of Mato Grosso do Sul. Its population was 7,621 (2020) and its area is 3,651 km^{2}.
