= Maracaju, Mato Grosso do Sul =

Maracaju
- Municipality
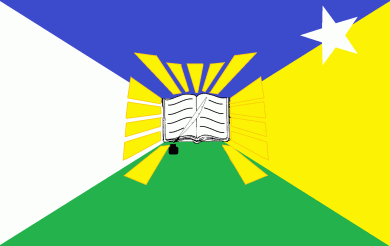
- Flag

- Location in Mato Grosso do Sul state

- Location in Brazil
- Coordinates: 21°36′50″S 55°10′04″W
- Country: Brazil
- Region: Central-West
- State: Mato Grosso do Sul

Area
  - Total: 5,299 km^{2} (2,046 sq mi)

Population (2020)
  - Total: 48,022
  - Density: 9.062/km^{2} (23.47/sq mi)
- Time zone: UTC−4 (AMT)

Maracaju is a municipality located in the Brazilian state of Mato Grosso do Sul, in the southwest. Its population was 48,022 (2020) and its area is 5,299 km^{2}. Its elevation is 421m.
