= Guia Lopes da Laguna =

Coordinates: 21°27′28″S 56°06′50″W

- Municipality
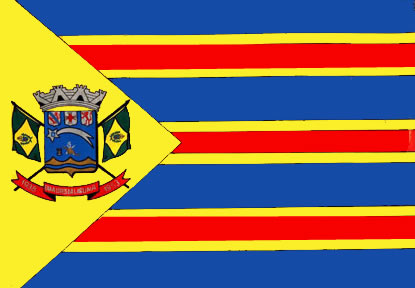
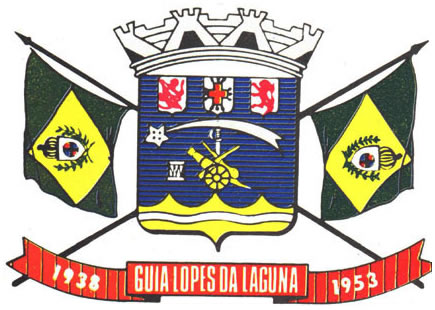
- Flag Coat of arms
- Nickname: Novos Horizontes
- Location in Brazil
- Country: Brazil
- Region: Center-West
- State: Mato Grosso do Sul
- Founded: 1938

Government
  - Mayor: Nelsom Inácio Moreno (DEM)
- Elevation: 272 m (892 ft)

Population (2020)
  - Total: 9,824
  - Density: 10.4/km^{2} (27/sq mi)
- Time zone: UTC−4 (AMT)
- HDI (2000): 0.755 – medium
- Website: Guia Lopes da Laguna, MS

Guia Lopes da Laguna is a municipality located in the Brazilian state of Mato Grosso do Sul. Its population was 9,824 (2020) and its area is 1,210 km^{2} (470 sq mi).
