= Vicentina, Mato Grosso do Sul =

Vicentina
- Municipality
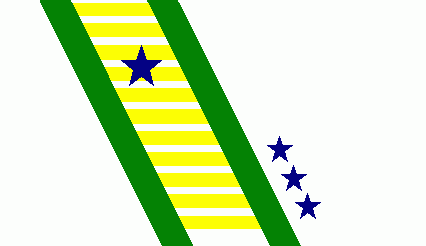
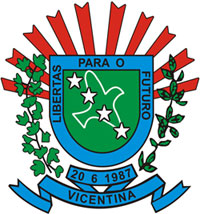
- Flag Coat of arms

- Location in Mato Grosso do Sul state

- Location in Brazil
- Coordinates: 22°24′32″S 54°26′09″W
- Country: Brazil
- Region: Central-West
- State: Mato Grosso do Sul
- Named for: Vincent Pallotti

Area
  - Total: 310 km^{2} (120 sq mi)

Population (2020)
  - Total: 6,109
  - Density: 20/km^{2} (51/sq mi)
- Time zone: UTC−4 (AMT)

Vicentina is a municipality located in the Brazilian state of Mato Grosso do Sul. Its population was 6,109 (2020) and its area is 310 km^{2} (120 sq mi).
