= Antônio João =

- Municipality
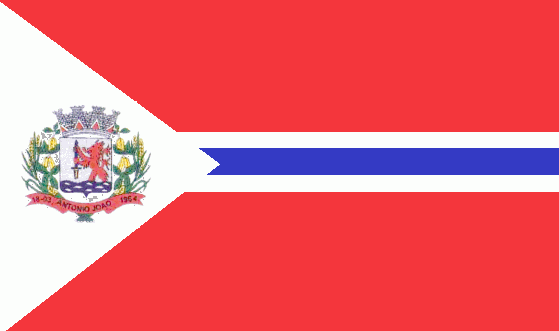
- Flag

- Location in Mato Grosso do Sul state

- Location in Brazil
- Coordinates: 22°11′28″S 55°57′51″W
- Country: Brazil
- Region: Central-West
- State: Mato Grosso do Sul

Area
  - Total: 1,144 km^{2} (442 sq mi)

Population (2020)
  - Total: 9,020
  - Density: 7.88/km^{2} (20.4/sq mi)
- Time zone: UTC−4 (AMT)

Antônio João is a municipality located in the Brazilian state of Mato Grosso do Sul. Its population was 9,020 (2020) and its area is 1,144 km^{2} (442 sq mi).
