= Glória de Dourados =

- Municipality
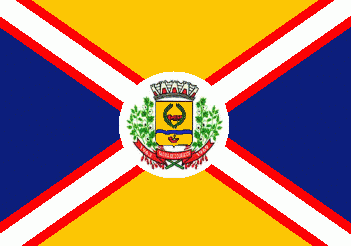
- Flag Coat of arms

- Location in Mato Grosso do Sul state

- Location in Brazil
- Coordinates: 22°25′04″S 54°13′58″W
- Country: Brazil
- Region: Central-West
- State: Mato Grosso do Sul

Area
  - Total: 492 km^{2} (190 sq mi)

Population (2020)
  - Total: 9,950
  - Density: 20.2/km^{2} (52.4/sq mi)
- Time zone: UTC−4 (AMT)

Glória de Dourados is a municipality located in the Brazilian state of Mato Grosso do Sul. Its population was 9,950 (2020) and its area is 492 km^{2}.
