= Nioaque =

- Municipality
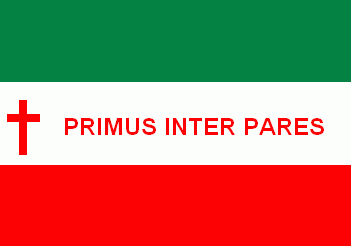
- Flag

- Location in Mato Grosso do Sul state

- Location in Brazil
- Coordinates: 21°08′06″S 55°49′48″W
- Country: Brazil
- Region: Central-West
- State: Mato Grosso do Sul

Area
  - Total: 3,924 km^{2} (1,515 sq mi)

Population (2020)
  - Total: 13,862
  - Density: 3.533/km^{2} (9.149/sq mi)
- Time zone: UTC−4 (AMT)

Nioaque is a municipality located in the Brazilian state of Mato Grosso do Sul. Its population was 13,862 (2020) and its area is 3,924 km^{2} (1,515 sq mi).
