= Dourados =

- Municipality
- Municipality of Dourados
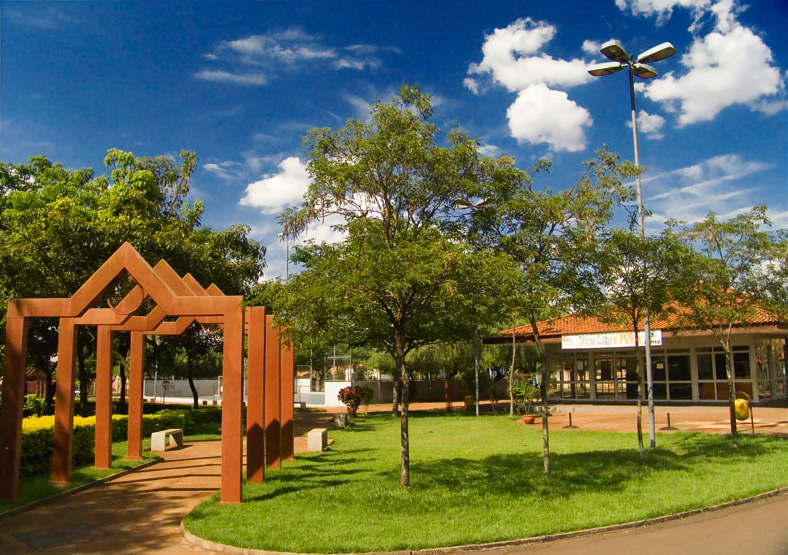

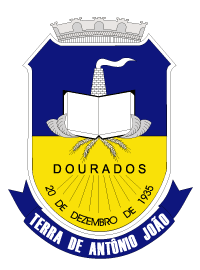
- Flag Coat of arms
- Nicknames: Model City; Mercosul Portal
- Motto: Terra de Antônio João
- Location in Mato Grosso do Sul

- Location within Brazil
- Coordinates: 22°13′15″S 54°48′21″W
- Country: Brazil
- State: Mato Grosso do Sul
- Founded: 1935

Government
  - Mayor: Marçal Filho (PSDB)

Area
  - Municipality: 4,086.4 km^{2} (1,577.8 sq mi)
  - Land: 4,086.4 km^{2} (1,577.8 sq mi)
  - Urban: 205.990 km^{2} (79.533 sq mi)
- Elevation: 430 m (1,410 ft)

Population (2026)
  - Municipality: 266,950
  - Density: 65.326/km^{2} (169.19/sq mi)
- Time zone: UTC−4 (AMT)
- HDI (2010): 0.747 – high
- Website: www.dourados.ms.gov.br

Dourados is a city and municipality, situated in the Brazilian state of Mato Grosso do Sul, 225 km (140 mi) Southwest of Campo Grande (the state's capital). It has a population of about 266,950 inhabitants, and its economy is based mainly in arable agriculture (particularly Soya, Maize and Sugar Cane) and in cattle ranching. Dourados is also the second most populous and important city of this state.

Its media, commerce, and services more than take care of the thirty cities of Mato Grosso do Sul, including a part of Paraguay. For its size and importance, it is an economic and social capital of a region that possesses approximately a million inhabitants (Vestibule of the Mercosul – the Common Market of the South).

Its development was slow until the first half of the 20th century, because of transportation limitations (highways and roads), especially with Campo Grande and the State of São Paulo. From 1950, it increased its development with the construction of roads. With this, it received migrants from other parts of the country (especially Sulistas and São Paulo) and immigrants (mainly Japanese). The city has a close relationship with Paraguay its next door neighbor, which is 120 km (75 mi) away. This is a strong factor in the ethnic and cultural union between the city and the neighboring country. This explains why 30% of the inhabitants of Dourados have some Paraguayan family link.

== Commerce and entertainment ==
Dourados has a modern shopping mall with 191 stores and 500 parking spaces. This city also offers to its citizens recreational parks and squares.

Dourados is well-served with many other shops, including those selling top Brazilian jeanswear brands such as Forum, Triton and Ellus and the middle-market clothes and homewares store Riachuelo.

There are nightclubs and many restaurants in the city centre which offer a broad range of cuisines including a number of Churrascarias (Churrasco is most commonly beef but also lamb and pork carved at the table from joints on skewers) as well as Pizza parlours and numerous places catering to the substantial Japanese community.

On Saturday night and Sunday morning there is a large open-air market (Feira) offering locally produced fruits and vegetables.

At the Feira there are restaurants providing Brazilian and Japanese food as well as stalls selling popular local delicacies such as sugarcane juice (Caldo de Cana), Doce de Leite (a type of caramel made from milk and sugar and cooked until it is either a thick syrup or it can be formed into fudge-like pieces) and cocada (coconut and condensed milk cooked until either sticky or hard).

Many locals make regular trips to the Paraguayan border town of Ponta Porã/Pedro Juan Caballero where they are able to buy relatively low-cost low-duty imported items such as electronic goods, perfumes and designer clothing.

== Education ==
Dourados has five universities, and more than 200 schools, and is considered an education pole of the state of Mato Grosso do Sul.

- Universidade Estadual de Mato Grosso do Sul (UEMS)
- Universidade Federal da Grande Dourados (UFGD)
- Centro Universitário da Grande Dourados (UNIGRAN)
- Faculdade Anhanguera (UNIDERP)
- Universidade Paulista (UNIP – Interativa)
- Instituto Federal de Mato Grosso do Sul (IFMS)

== Sports ==
Clube Recreativo Desportivo 7 de Setembro and Ubiratan Esporte Clube are two football clubs based in the city. Both clubs play at Estadio Fredis Saldivar. Another stadium located in the city is named Estádio Napoleão de Souza.

== Transportation ==
Dourados is served by Francisco de Matos Pereira Airport located 14 km from downtown Dourados.

== Demography ==
=== People ===
Growth of people in Dourados
1940	14.985
1950	22.834
1960	84.955
1970	79.186
1980	106.483
1991	135.984
1996	153.191
2000	164.700
2005	183.096
2010	196.068
2014	210.218
2020	225.495

== Notable people ==
- Lucas Leiva, football player
- Keirrison, football player
- Lucas Kanieski, swimmer

== Sister cities ==
- Iquique, Chile
- Kearney, Nebraska, United States

== Climate ==
Climate data for Dourados (1981–2010 normals, extremes 1971–1984, 1993–present)
Month	Jan	Feb	Mar	Apr	May	Jun	Jul	Aug	Sep	Oct	Nov	Dec	Year
Record high °C (°F)	37.2 (99.0)	37.3 (99.1)	37.1 (98.8)	35.3 (95.5)	34.0 (93.2)	32.8 (91.0)	34.3 (93.7)	38.0 (100.4)	41.2 (106.2)	40.3 (104.5)	38.7 (101.7)	37.4 (99.3)	41.2 (106.2)
Mean daily maximum °C (°F)	31.8 (89.2)	31.4 (88.5)	30.9 (87.6)	29.1 (84.4)	26.5 (79.7)	24.1 (75.4)	26.3 (79.3)	28.0 (82.4)	29.0 (84.2)	30.3 (86.5)	31.1 (88.0)	30.9 (87.6)	29.1 (84.4)
Daily mean °C (°F)	25.4 (77.7)	24.9 (76.8)	24.4 (75.9)	22.3 (72.1)	19.9 (67.8)	17.6 (63.7)	18.5 (65.3)	20.0 (68.0)	21.6 (70.9)	23.7 (74.7)	24.6 (76.3)	24.9 (76.8)	22.3 (72.1)
Mean daily minimum °C (°F)	21.3 (70.3)	21.0 (69.8)	20.1 (68.2)	17.6 (63.7)	15.3 (59.5)	13.0 (55.4)	12.9 (55.2)	14.1 (57.4)	16.2 (61.2)	18.7 (65.7)	19.7 (67.5)	20.3 (68.5)	17.5 (63.5)
Record low °C (°F)	12.1 (53.8)	12.5 (54.5)	8.0 (46.4)	4.6 (40.3)	3.3 (37.9)	0.6 (33.1)	−1.7 (28.9)	−0.8 (30.6)	0.2 (32.4)	6.0 (42.8)	10.5 (50.9)	11.0 (51.8)	−1.7 (28.9)
Average precipitation mm (inches)	168.1 (6.62)	130.8 (5.15)	145.5 (5.73)	106.0 (4.17)	92.1 (3.63)	99.0 (3.90)	40.2 (1.58)	45.0 (1.77)	113.0 (4.45)	153.2 (6.03)	143.2 (5.64)	205.7 (8.10)	1,441.8 (56.76)
Average precipitation days (≥ 1.0 mm)	12	12	10	7	7	7	3	3	6	11	10	11	99
Average relative humidity (%)	80.9	82.9	80.3	77.6	78.1	79.0	70.3	66.0	68.6	73.9	75.4	79.0	76.0
Mean monthly sunshine hours	220.9	184.1	211.9	222.3	199.8	174.8	228.4	191.7	170.4	201.7	217.7	219.0	2,442.7
Source: Instituto Nacional de Meteorologia
