= Rio Brilhante, Mato Grosso do Sul =

Rio Brilhante
- Municipality
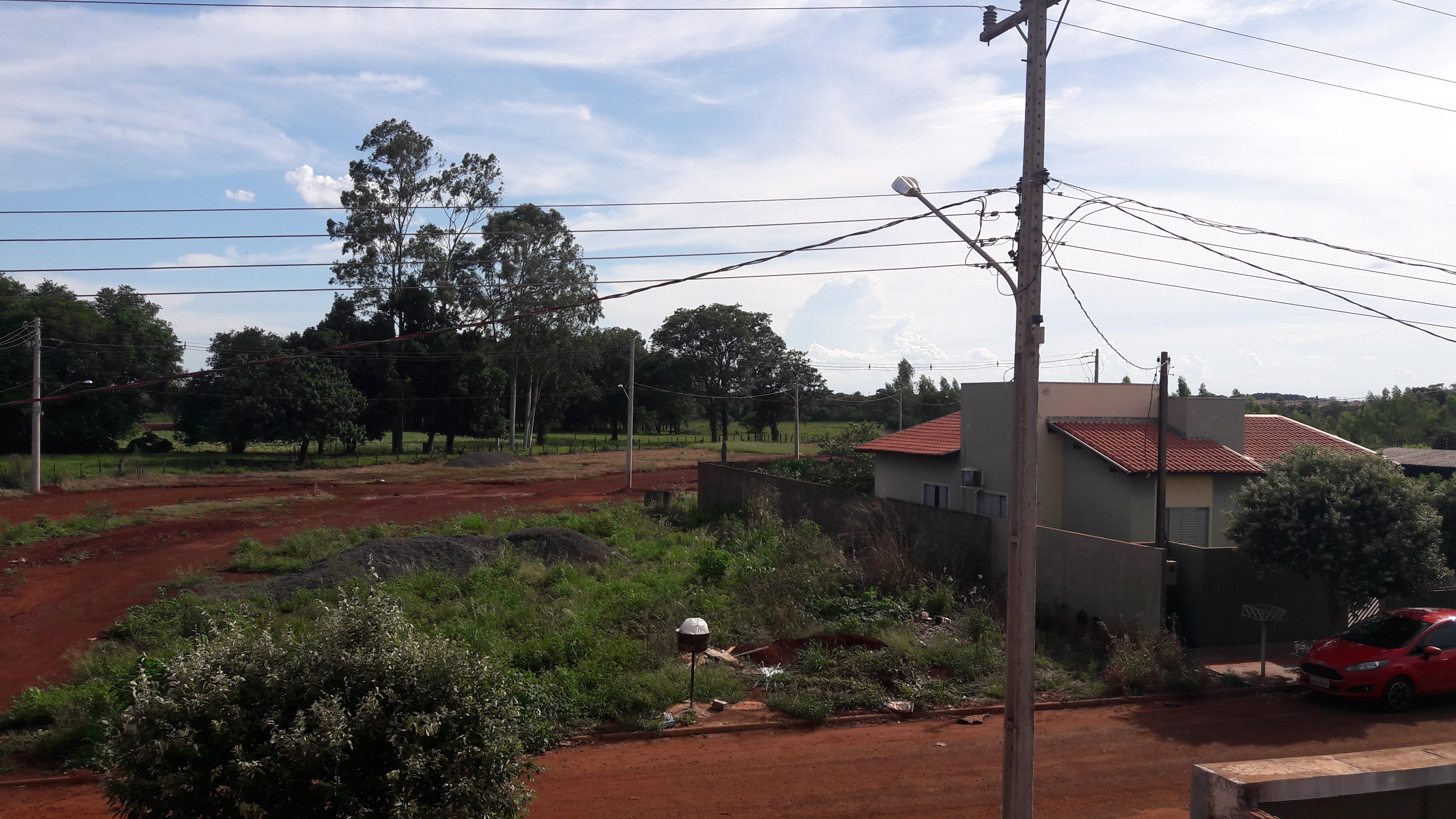

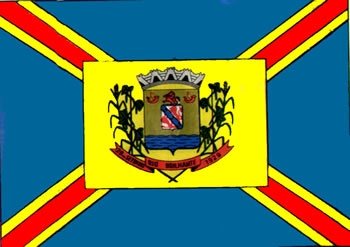
- Flag

- Location in Mato Grosso do Sul state

- Location in Brazil
- Coordinates: 21°48′07″S 54°32′45″W
- Country: Brazil
- Region: Central-West
- State: Mato Grosso do Sul

Area
  - Total: 3,988 km^{2} (1,540 sq mi)

Population (2020)
  - Total: 38,186
  - Density: 9.575/km^{2} (24.80/sq mi)
- Time zone: UTC−4 (AMT)

Rio Brilhante is a municipality located in the Brazilian state of Mato Grosso do Sul. Its population was 38,186 (2020) and its area is 3,988 km^{2}.
