= List of airports by ICAO code: SI =

List of airports by ICAO code: A - B - C - D - EB-EG - EH-EY - FA-FM - FN-FZ - G - H - ~~I~~ - J - KA-KH - KI-KP - KR-KZ - LA-LJ - LK-LZ - M - N - O - P - Q - R - SA-SC - SD-SH - SI - SJ - SK-SM - SN-SP - SQ - SS-SU - SV-SY - T - U - V - W - ~~X~~ - Y - Z

== SI - Brazil ==
Also see airport category and list.

ICAO	IATA	Airport name	Community	Coordinates	Notes
SIAA		Aeroandrés Heliport	Mairipora, São Paulo	23°23′43″S 046°38′20″W	Closed
SIAB		Guatambu São Paulo Aerodrome	Buri, São Paulo	23°37′12″S 048°30′39″W	
SIAC		Paineira Farm Aerodrome	São Sebastião da Bela Vista, Minas Gerais	22°08′51″S 045°45′49″W	
SIAD		Regina Estate Aerodrome	Porto Murtinho, Mato Grosso do Sul	21°00′38″S 057°21′09″W	
SIAE		BASF Guaratinguetá Heliport	Guaratinguetá, São Paulo	22°47′10″S 045°10′14″W	
SIAF		Águas Finas Heliport	Paudalho, Pernambuco	07°54′36″S 035°02′55″W	
SIAG		Goiasa Farm Aerodrome	Goiatuba, Goiás	18°02′01″S 049°42′20″W	
SIAH		Haras RM Heliport	Aquiraz, Ceará	03°54′47″S 038°26′05″W	
SIAI		Esteirinha Farm Aerodrome	Goioerê, Paraná	24°12′33″S 053°10′53″W	
SIAJ		Tauá Farm	Prado, Bahia	16°59′00″S 039°09′50″W	
SIAK		Santa Casa de Misericórdia de Porto Alegre Heliport	Porto Alegre, Rio Grande do Sul	30°01′48″S 051°13′14″W	
SIAL		Summerville Heliport	Ipojuca, Pernambuco	08°26′07″S 034°58′57″W	
SIAM		Francisca Mendes Heliport	Manaus, Amazonas	03°01′57″S 059°57′51″W	
SIAN		Clube CÉU Aerodrome	Rio de Janeiro, Rio de Janeiro	22°57′41″S 043°39′34″W	
SIAO		Araras Farm Aerodrome	Corguinho, Mato Grosso do Sul	19°37′47″S 055°15′07″W	
SIAP		Our Lady of Aparecida Farm Aerodrome	Nova Ubiratã, Mato Grosso	12°59′55″S 055°12′50″W	
SIAQ	LCL	Bom Futuro Private Airport	Cuiabá, Mato Grosso	15°30′23″S 056°05′54″W	
SIAR		Arancuã Farm Aerodrome	Miranda, Mato Grosso do Sul	20°10′47″S 056°33′24″W	
SIAS		Cachoeira Alta Farm Aerodrome	Paranatinga, Mato Grosso	12°56′25″S 054°16′06″W	
SIAT		Tolosa Farm Aerodrome	Brasnorte, Mato Grosso	13°10′57″S 057°59′50″W	
SIAU		Pirizal Farm Aerodrome	Vila Bela da Santíssima Trindade, Mato Grosso	16°13′29″S 059°45′18″W	
SIAV		Helipark Heliport	Carapicuíba, São Paulo	23°33′53″S 046°49′49″W	
SIAW		Sítio Gurupi Aerodrome	Ulianópolis, Pará	03°44′21″S 047°30′59″W	
SIAX		HJ Farm Aerodrome	Unaí, Minas Gerais	16°36′49″S 047°17′46″W	
SIAY		Santa Fé do Guaporé Farm Aerodrome	Comodoro, Mato Grosso	14°00′53″S 059°52′44″W	
SIAZ		Água Azul Farm Aerodrome	Campo Verde, Mato Grosso	15°15′35″S 054°56′40″W	
SIBA		Arco Íris Farm Aerodrome	Alto Garças, Mato Grosso	16°56′01″S 053°34′22″W	
SIBB		Comendador Alberto Bonfiglioli Building Heliport	São Paulo, São Paulo	23°33′52″S 046°39′07″W	
SIBC		Bonança Farm Aerodrome	Pereira Barreto, São Paulo	20°40′35″S 051°01′51″W	
SIBD		Beverly Hills Heliport	Petrópolis, Rio de Janeiro	22°21′31″S 043°05′56″W	
SIBE		Marina Park Heliport	Fortaleza, Ceará	03°43′09″S 038°31′55″W	Closed
SIBF		Haras Neves Heliport	Pedro Leopoldo, Minas Gerais	19°38′58″S 044°08′56″W	
SIBG		Banco Induscred Heliport	São Paulo, São Paulo	23°33′52″S 046°39′21″W	
SIBH		Helicidade Heliport	São Paulo, São Paulo	23°32′48″S 046°44′13″W	
SIBI		Boa Luz Farm Aerodrome	Laranjeiras, Sergipe	10°50′17″S 037°11′46″W	
SIBJ		Retiro do Bom Fim Farm Aerodrome	Ipiaçu, Minas Gerais	18°40′51″S 049°59′13″W	
SIBK		Aeroclube de Bagé Aerodrome	Bagé, Rio Grande do Sul	31°19′40″S 054°08′09″W	
SIBL		Clínica Porto Dias Heliport	Belém, Pará	01°26′15″S 048°27′30″W	
SIBM		Hangar ABC Heliport	São Caetano do Sul, São Paulo	23°37′01″S 046°34′49″W	
SIBN		Savana Aerodrome	Jaru, Rondônia	10°26′29″S 062°30′26″W	
SIBO		Simão Sarkis Simão Aerodrome	Três Marias, Minas Gerais	18°18′35″S 045°17′36″W	
SIBP		Pampa Alegre Farm Aerodrome	Itiquira, Mato Grosso	17°29′55″S 054°18′36″W	
SIBQ		Barroco Lopes Heliport	Macaé, Rio de Janeiro	22°19′20″S 041°44′42″W	
SIBR		Ribeirão Shopping Centre Heliport	Ribeirão Preto, São Paulo	21°12′42″S 047°49′05″W	
SIBS		E-Business Bosque Heliport	São Paulo, São Paulo	23°30′43″S 046°42′37″W	
SIBT		Transportadora Americana II Heliport	Americana, São Paulo	22°43′56″S 047°17′10″W	
SIBU		Jerônimo Sérgio Rosado Maia Airport	Catolé do Rocha, Paraíba	06°21′45″S 037°45′19″W	
SIBV		Bela Vista Farm	Nova Alvorada do Sul, Mato Grosso do Sul	21°26′19″S 054°29′14″W	
SIBW		Conceição Airport	Conceição, Paraíba	07°33′30″S 038°29′48″W	
SIBX		WEM Agropecuária Aerodrome	Buritama, São Paulo	21°05′29″S 050°14′38″W	
SIBY		Lourival Nunes de Farias Airport	Monteiro, Paraíba	07°52′42″S 037°08′12″W	
SIBZ		Itaporanga Airport	Itaporanga, Paraíba	07°18′40″S 038°06′49″W	
SICA		Anchieta Hospital Heliport	Brasília, Federal District	15°49′26″S 048°04′02″W	
SICB		Pedro Simões Pimenta Aerodrome	Cuité, Paraíba	06°29′15″S 036°08′24″W	
SICC		Campo Alto Farm Heliport	Araras, São Paulo	22°23′20″S 047°17′12″W	
SICD		Mima 2 Heliport	Cardoso Moreira, Rio de Janeiro	21°34′43″S 041°26′47″W	
SICE		Central Engenharia Heliport	São Luís, Maranhão	02°32′07″S 044°17′59″W	
SICF		Catuaí Farm Aerodrome	Juara, Mato Grosso	11°28′06″S 057°36′34″W	
SICG		Rede TV Heliport	Osasco, São Paulo	23°31′15″S 046°45′47″W	
SICH		Hotel Campos do Jordão Heliport	Campos do Jordão, São Paulo	22°43′04″S 045°34′40″W	
SICI		Metropolitan Criciúma Heliport	Criciúma, Santa Catarina	28°40′32″S 049°21′59″W	
SICJ		Morandi e Morandi Aviação Agrícola Aerodrome	Sapezal, Mato Grosso	13°27′40″S 058°46′40″W	
SICK		Dr. Jucelino José Ribeiro Aerodrome	Capelinha, Minas Gerais	17°40′50″S 042°31′46″W	
SICL		Praia da Piraquara Heliport	Angra dos Reis, Rio de Janeiro	22°59′07″S 044°26′20″W	
SICM		Our Lady of Fatima Farm	Brasilândia, Mato Grosso do Sul	21°32′20″S 052°06′38″W	
SICN		Vista Bonita Farm Aerodrome	Sandovalina, São Paulo	22°30′23″S 051°48′59″W	
SICO		Columbia II Heliport	Fundão, Espírito Santo	19°56′15″S 040°24′40″W	
SICP		São Pedro Farm Aerodrome	Unaí, Minas Gerais	16°47′59″S 046°44′39″W	
SICQ		Luar Farm Aerodrome	Cuiabá, Mato Grosso	15°33′15″S 055°41′30″W	
SICR		Coração do Brasil Farm	Pontes e Lacerda, Mato Grosso	15°58′12″S 059°38′36″W	
SICS		Santa Terezinha Farm Aerodrome	Santa Rita do Trivelato, Mato Grosso	13°40′15″S 055°32′00″W	
SICT		Elektro Heliport	Campinas, São Paulo	22°59′48″S 047°06′23″W	
SICU		Ouro Branco Aerodrome	Paracatu, Minas Gerais	16°42′37″S 047°00′53″W	
SICV		Porto Marina Astúrias Heliport	Guarujá, São Paulo	24°00′02″S 046°17′37″W	
SICW		Santa Fé Farm Aerodrome	Campo Alegre de Goiás, Goiás	17°27′18″S 047°49′31″W	
SICX		Salvador Trade Centre Heliport	Salvador, Bahia	12°59′02″S 038°27′13″W	
SICY		Apucarana Farm Aerodrome	Marabá, Pará	05°27′48″S 049°46′22″W	
SICZ		Lorena Commercial Building Heliport	São Paulo, São Paulo	23°34′24″S 046°39′20″W	
SIDA		Dakota Building Heliport	São Paulo, São Paulo	23°35′40″S 046°41′01″W	
SIDB		Dr. Almir Lopes de Oliveira Melo Aerodrome	Coelho Neto, Maranhão	04°16′08″S 043°00′02″W	
SIDC		Sítio Sobradinho Heliport	Paraty, Rio de Janeiro	23°13′17″S 044°47′03″W	
SIDD		São Braz Farm Heliport	Barra de Santo Antônio, Alagoas	09°22′46″S 035°30′30″W	
SIDE		São Paulo Federal Police Heliport	São Paulo, São Paulo	23°30′41″S 046°42′16″W	
SIDF		São José Farm Aerodrome	Cáceres, Mato Grosso	16°04′03″S 058°28′47″W	
SIDG		Irmãos Gonçalves Aerodrome	Jaru, Rondônia	10°25′24″S 062°31′02″W	
SIDH		Brascan Century Plaza Green Valley Commercial Heliport	Barueri, São Paulo	23°29′08″S 046°51′51″W	
SIDI		Cachoeira Farm Heliport	Caeté, Minas Gerais	19°49′46″S 043°37′49″W	
SIDJ		Arpa Farm Aerodrome	Santa Maria das Barreiras, Pará	08°56′55″S 050°30′49″W	
SIDK		Boqueirão do Cedro Farm Aerodrome	Arraias, Tocantins	12°53′25″S 046°41′36″W	
SIDL		Deus é Amor Heliport	São Paulo, São Paulo	23°33′21″S 046°37′29″W	
SIDM		Cibrapa Farm Aerodrome	Barra do Garças, Mato Grosso	15°02′13″S 052°05′58″W	
SIDN		Figueiral Farm Aerodrome	Corumbá, Mato Grosso do Sul	18°23′48″S 055°24′50″W	
SIDO		Pagador Aerodrome	Presidente Prudente, São Paulo	22°11′02″S 051°28′29″W	
SIDP		Vale das Palmeiras Heliport	Macaé, Rio de Janeiro	22°23′18″S 041°51′21″W	
SIDQ		Das Quaresmas Heliport	Angra dos Reis, Rio de Janeiro	23°00′59″S 044°17′28″W	
SIDR		Retiro Piúva Aerodrome	Miranda, Mato Grosso do Sul	19°50′14″S 056°42′12″W	
SIDS		Romaer Aviação Agrícola	Aral Moreira, Mato Grosso do Sul	22°55′53″S 055°35′19″W	
SIDT		Edise Heliport	Rio de Janeiro, Rio de Janeiro	22°54′33″S 043°10′44″W	
SIDU		Cidade da Polícia Heliport	Rio de Janeiro, Rio de Janeiro	22°52′48″S 043°15′18″W	
SIDV		Doutor Saulo Villela Aerodrome	Juiz de Fora, Minas Gerais	21°46′49″S 043°16′49″W	
SIDW		Cortezia Farm Aerodrome	Lucas do Rio Verde, Mato Grosso	13°00′02″S 056°05′17″W	
SIDX		Vila Adail 2 Heliport	Elias Fausto, São Paulo	23°03′02″S 047°23′47″W	
SIDY		Yanduy Farm Aerodrome	Lunardelli, Paraná	24°04′39″S 051°49′10″W	
SIDZ		Santa Fé Farm Aerodrome	Tabocas do Brejo Velho, Bahia	12°13′30″S 044°02′21″W	
SIEA		Ibiporã Farm Aerodrome	Guararapes, São Paulo	21°27′59″S 050°47′55″W	
SIEB		São Bento Farm Aerodrome	Sidrolândia, Mato Grosso do Sul	21°04′18″S 055°07′29″W	
SIEC		Agropecuária Cachoeira Aerodrome	Jaraguari, Mato Grosso do Sul	20°03′05″S 054°15′24″W	
SIED		Espadim Farm Aerodrome	Paranhos, Mato Grosso do Sul	23°47′39″S 055°20′09″W	
SIEE		Ecovias Imigrantes Heliport	São Bernardo do Campo, São Paulo	23°47′04″S 046°35′48″W	
SIEF		São José Farm Aerodrome	Campo Grande, Mato Grosso do Sul	20°34′17″S 054°42′55″W	
SIEG		Chapadão Farm Aerodrome	Guarda-Mor, Minas Gerais	17°53′38″S 047°14′38″W	
SIEH		Vô Chico Farm Aerodrome	Jales, São Paulo	20°18′44″S 050°36′45″W	
SIEI		Helicia Heliport	Simões Filho, Bahia	12°50′21″S 038°25′35″W	
SIEJ		Monte Verde Aerodrome	Nova Monte Verde, Mato Grosso	09°56′32″S 057°29′09″W	
SIEK		Espírito Santo Farm Aerodrome	Cachoeira do Arari, Pará	00°59′16″S 048°53′21″W	
SIEL		Eletro Cesar Primavera Aerodrome	Pimenta Bueno, Rondônia	11°54′14″S 061°13′33″W	
SIEM		Encantado Farm Aerodrome	Sapezal, Mato Grosso	13°19′00″S 058°47′54″W	
SIEN		Santa Eulina Farm Aerodrome	Corumbá, Mato Grosso do Sul	18°07′37″S 056°31′36″W	
SIEO		Mendonça Farm Aerodrome	São Sebastião do Oeste, Minas Gerais	20°13′53″S 044°55′31″W	
SIEP		Riachuelo/Matriz Heliport	São Paulo, São Paulo	23°30′04″S 046°38′47″W	Closed
SIEQ		Tauá Farm Aerodrome	Nova Mutum, Mato Grosso	13°18′22″S 056°34′23″W	
SIER		Cosan Heliport	Piracicaba, São Paulo	22°37′59″S 047°41′13″W	
SIES		Ciclade Heliport	São Sebastião, São Paulo	23°46′08″S 045°38′02″W	
SIET		CD 19 Heliport	Guarujá, São Paulo	23°57′19″S 046°11′23″W	
SIEU		Diamante Heliport	Jaú, São Paulo	22°22′24″S 048°41′35″W	
SIEV		Boca da Onça Farm Aerodrome	Bodoquena, Mato Grosso do Sul	20°46′00″S 056°42′26″W	
SIEW		Areia Branca Aerodrome	Novo Aripuanã, Amazonas	07°59′16″S 061°03′01″W	
SIEX		São Joaquim I Farm Aerodrome	Santa Vitória, Minas Gerais	19°00′32″S 050°25′53″W	
SIEY		Palácio das Mangabeiras Heliport	Belo Horizonte, Minas Gerais	19°57′12″S 043°54′44″W	
SIEZ		Asa Branca Aerodrome	Tubarão, Santa Catarina	28°31′41″S 048°56′57″W	
SIFA		Sete Farm Aerodrome	Aquidauana, Mato Grosso do Sul	19°47′08″S 056°28′26″W	
SIFB		Sítio Canhanheiro Heliport	Paraty, Rio de Janeiro	23°13′25″S 044°41′07″W	
SIFC		Coroa do Avião Aerodrome	Igarassu, Pernambuco	07°50′40″S 034°53′29″W	
SIFD		Santa Marina II Farm Aerodrome	Campo Grande, Mato Grosso do Sul	21°22′27″S 053°51′53″W	
SIFE		Estiva Farm Aerodrome	Maracaju, Mato Grosso do Sul	21°43′31″S 055°05′39″W	
SIFF		Sunset Airfield	São Francisco de Paula, Rio Grande do Sul	29°19′26″S 050°44′23″W	
SIFG		Life Centre Heliport	Belo Horizonte, Minas Gerais	19°56′07″S 043°55′28″W	
SIFH		Vale do Jaguaribe Regional Hospital Heliport	Limoeiro do Norte, Ceará	05°07′07″S 038°08′54″W	
SIFI		Amazonas Business Hotel Heliport	Manaus, Amazonas	03°05′33″S 060°01′13″W	
SIFJ		Bom Jesus Farm Aerodrome	Pedra Preta, Mato Grosso	16°47′38″S 054°06′34″W	
SIFK		Santa Teresa Hospital Heliport	Petrópolis, Rio de Janeiro	22°30′29″S 043°11′38″W	
SIFL		FIESC Heliport	Florianópolis, Santa Catarina	27°35′31″S 048°29′37″W	
SIFM		Mimoso Farm Aerodrome	Chapadão do Sul, Mato Grosso do Sul	19°03′00″S 052°57′56″W	
SIFN		Cachoeira Branca Farm Aerodrome	Ribas do Rio Pardo, Mato Grosso do Sul	20°53′28″S 053°24′15″W	
SIFP		EPCCO Heliport	Registro, São Paulo	24°31′29″S 047°51′02″W	
SIFQ		Condomínio Menega Aerodrome	Flores da Cunha, Rio Grande do Sul	29°02′41″S 051°08′36″W	
SIFR		Santa Maria Farm Heliport	Cravinhos, São Paulo	21°17′06″S 047°45′27″W	
SIFS		Fazenda dos Sonhos Aerodrome	Anastácio, Mato Grosso do Sul	20°45′32″S 056°01′57″W	
SIFT		Travessão Farm Aerodrome	Vila Bela da Santíssima Trindade, Mato Grosso	16°08′38″S 060°07′14″W	
SIFU		Ribeirão Farm Aerodrome	Barra do Piraí, Rio de Janeiro	22°24′56″S 043°46′31″W	
SIFV		Primo Bitti Aerodrome	Aracruz, Espírito Santo	19°49′35″S 040°06′03″W	
SIFW		São Lourenço Farm Aerodrome	Corumbá, Mato Grosso do Sul	17°43′09″S 056°59′50″W	
SIFX		Patropi Farm Aerodrome	São Félix do Xingu, Pará	09°18′29″S 051°36′39″W	
SIFY		Conduspar Heliport	São José dos Pinhais, Paraná	25°34′21″S 049°09′09″W	Closed
SIFZ		Hungria 1100 Heliport	São Paulo, São Paulo	23°34′40″S 046°41′40″W	
SIGA		Granja Santiago Farm Aerodrome	Paracatu, Minas Gerais	17°09′44″S 046°39′36″W	
SIGB		Mormaii Heliport	Garopaba, Santa Catarina	28°02′35″S 048°37′32″W	
SIGC		Porto Cubatão Heliport	Cananéia, São Paulo	24°58′31″S 047°56′41″W	
SIGD		Guidoni Heliport	São Domingos do Norte, Espírito Santo	19°11′25″S 040°37′49″W	
SIGE		Alberi Juliani Aerodrome	Lagoa da Confusão, Tocantins	10°47′20″S 049°35′06″W	
SIGF		Rumenos Sarkis Simão Aerodrome	Padre Bernardo, Goiás	15°08′23″S 048°14′36″W	
SIGG		FSA Aerodrome	Nova Maringá, Mato Grosso	12°48′52″S 057°10′46″W	
SIGH		Igarashi Heliport	Papanduva, Santa Catarina	26°23′34″S 050°09′53″W	
SIGI		Cardeiros Farm Aerodrome	São Pedro da Aldeia, Rio de Janeiro	22°52′45″S 042°07′53″W	
SIGJ		HCA Heliport	Rio de Janeiro, Rio de Janeiro	22°55′12″S 043°12′41″W	
SIGK		CD Guarulhos Heliport	Guarulhos, São Paulo	23°26′48″S 046°26′40″W	
SIGL		Dumont–Chiquinho Ribeiro Farm Aerodrome	Bragança Paulista, São Paulo	23°00′24″S 046°38′48″W	
SIGM		Gandini Terras Heliport	Itu, São Paulo	23°17′56″S 047°17′15″W	
SIGN		ACGC Aerodrome	Mimoso de Goiás, Goiás	15°02′43″S 048°13′56″W	Closed
SIGO		Paulista Plaza Condominium Heliport	São Paulo, São Paulo	23°34′25″S 046°38′31″W	
SIGP		Rio–Bravo Heliport	Rio de Janeiro, Rio de Janeiro	22°54′33″S 043°10′54″W	
SIGQ		National Steel Company Aeroclub Heliport	Volta Redonda, Rio de Janeiro	22°29′57″S 044°04′52″W	
SIGR		Asa Branca Heliport	Gravatá, Pernambuco	08°11′27″S 035°31′03″W	
SIGS		São Francisco Farm Aerodrome	Mundo Novo, Goiás	13°55′10″S 050°00′36″W	
SIGT		Goiabeira Farm Aerodrome	Itaberá, São Paulo	23°59′22″S 049°10′45″W	
SIGU		Iguatemi Ribeirão Preto Heliport	Ribeirão Preto, São Paulo	21°13′32″S 047°50′13″W	
SIGV		Rede Record Heliport	São Paulo, São Paulo	23°31′25″S 046°39′45″W	
SIGW		Serra Grande Farm Aerodrome	Ribeiro Gonçalves, Piauí	08°20′36″S 045°31′05″W	
SIGX		Gairova Farm Aerodrome	Juara, Mato Grosso	11°11′55″S 058°14′10″W	
SIGY		Guadiana Farm Aerodrome	Martinópolis, São Paulo	22°04′27″S 051°02′20″W	
SIGZ		Represa Heliport	São Paulo, São Paulo	23°37′02″S 046°41′56″W	
SIHA		Agropecuária São Bernardo Aerodrome	São Miguel das Missões, Rio Grande do Sul	28°49′06″S 054°22′57″W	
SIHB		Soberana Farm Aerodrome	Grajaú, Maranhão	05°27′19″S 046°03′48″W	
SIHC		Cel PM Cícero Dantas dos Santos Heliport	Vitória, Espírito Santo	20°17′37″S 040°18′45″W	
SIHD		Divena Heliport	São Paulo, São Paulo	23°35′54″S 046°37′20″W	
SIHE		Fortesolo Heliport	Paranaguá, Paraná	25°33′15″S 048°33′28″W	
SIHF		Flamboyant II Heliport	Goiânia, Goiás	16°42′34″S 049°14′09″W	
SIHG		Gois Heliport	Valparaíso de Goiás, Goiás	16°03′49″S 047°59′56″W	
SIHH		Insólito Hotel Heliport	Armação dos Búzios, Rio de Janeiro	22°46′11″S 041°52′58″W	
SIHI		Itaipavas Farm Aerodrome	Piçarra, Pará	06°36′59″S 048°59′45″W	
SIHJ		Jaru Tradição Heliport	Jaru, Rondônia	10°26′33″S 062°26′54″W	
SIHK		Santa Catarina Hospital Heliport	São Paulo, São Paulo	23°34′08″S 046°38′44″W	
SIHL		Rio Centro Heliport	Rio de Janeiro, Rio de Janeiro	22°58′47″S 043°24′34″W	
SIHM		North Star Helicentre Heliport	Eusébio, Ceará	03°48′39″S 038°26′03″W	
SIHN		Marina Beach Tower Heliport	Balneário Camboriú, Santa Catarina	27°00′20″S 048°37′14″W	
SIHO		Kia Heliport	Itu, São Paulo	23°17′03″S 047°17′27″W	
SIHP		Esperança Farm Aerodrome	Itapeva, São Paulo	23°52′03″S 048°48′21″W	
SIHQ		Águas Claras I Official Residence Heliport	Brasília, Federal District	15°49′45″S 048°01′44″W	
SIHR		Vilacóptero II Heliport	Vila Velha, Espírito Santo	20°30′11″S 040°22′24″W	
SIHS		Faria Lima Premium Building Heliport	São Paulo, São Paulo	23°34′11″S 046°41′35″W	
SIHT		Tangúa Heliport	Angra dos Reis, Rio de Janeiro	23°00′08″S 044°21′12″W	
SIHU		Unimed Poços de Caldas Heliport	Poços de Caldas, Minas Gerais	21°46′23″S 046°35′32″W	Closed
SIHV		Ouro Verde Farm Aerodrome	Juscimeira, Mato Grosso	16°14′12″S 055°06′59″W	
SIHW		Agrishow Aerodrome	Ribeirão Preto, São Paulo	21°12′42″S 047°51′58″W	
SIHX		Pau D'Alho Farm Aerodrome	Nova Bandeirantes, Mato Grosso	09°24′22″S 058°11′28″W	
SIHY		Tom Aviação Agrícola Aerodrome	Itápolis, São Paulo	21°37′38″S 048°46′54″W	
SIHZ		Nannai Resort and Spa Heliport	Ipojuca, Pernambuco	08°25′55″S 034°58′53″W	
SIIA		Paraná Farm Aerodrome	Brasnorte, Mato Grosso	11°40′08″S 058°14′29″W	
SIIB		Da Praia Heliport	Armação dos Búzios, Rio de Janeiro	22°46′26″S 041°53′24″W	
SIIC		Celeiro 1 Aerodrome	Jaborandi, Bahia	14°22′11″S 045°32′28″W	
SIID		Dona Chica Farm Aerodrome	Osório, Rio Grande do Sul	30°02′01″S 050°22′20″W	
SIIE		Santa Fé Farm Aerodrome	Guia Lopes da Laguna, Mato Grosso do Sul	21°28′24″S 055°52′44″W	
SIIF		Carmel Hotels Heliport	São Gonçalo do Amarante, Ceará	03°30′22″S 038°54′14″W	
SIIG		Elisa Camargo de Arruda Botelho Aerodrome	Rancharia, São Paulo	22°21′40″S 051°06′05″W	
SIIH		Torre 2000 Heliport	São Paulo, São Paulo	23°34′00″S 046°41′11″W	
SIII		Dr. Heráclito da Motta Luiz Aerodrome	Guaíra, São Paulo	20°25′59″S 048°13′28″W	
SIIJ		São Geraldo Aerodrome	Bonito, Mato Grosso do Sul	21°15′37″S 056°34′04″W	
SIIK		Santa Lídia Farm	Ribas do Rio Pardo, Mato Grosso do Sul	20°43′19″S 053°41′16″W	
SIIL		Civil Towers Heliport	Salvador, Bahia	12°59′21″S 038°26′54″W	
SIIM		Marisol Heliport	Jaraguá do Sul, Santa Catarina	26°28′56″S 049°03′51″W	
SIIN		Marrecão Farm Aerodrome	São Miguel do Guaporé, Rondônia	12°02′24″S 063°02′32″W	
SIIO		Itaorna Heliport	Angra dos Reis, Rio de Janeiro	23°00′18″S 044°27′57″W	
SIIP		Paraíso Farm Aerodrome	Alfenas, Minas Gerais	21°03′59″S 045°50′18″W	
SIIQ		Palácio Boa Vista Heliport	Campos do Jordão, São Paulo	22°44′06″S 045°36′24″W	
SIIR		Brascan Century Plaza Heliport	São Paulo, São Paulo	23°35′03″S 046°40′32″W	
SIIS		Uberaba Farm Aerodrome	Alto Paraíso, Paraná	23°39′19″S 053°50′00″W	
SIIT		Cachoeira Farm Aerodrome	Anastácio, Mato Grosso do Sul	20°45′35″S 055°34′19″W	
SIIU		Santa Marta Aerodrome	Campo Florido, Minas Gerais	19°38′31″S 048°42′43″W	
SIIV		Kekafly II Heliport	Brusque, Santa Catarina	27°05′21″S 048°54′55″W	
SIIW		TECNET 2 Heliport	Santana de Parnaíba, São Paulo	23°27′15″S 046°52′12″W	
SIIX		Bira Guimarães Heliport	Igaratá, São Paulo	23°11′43″S 046°05′41″W	
SIIY		Brasil 21 Condominium Heliport	Brasília, Federal District	15°47′34″S 047°53′38″W	
SIIZ		Iporanga Farm Aerodrome	Mutunópolis, Goiás	13°45′30″S 049°28′23″W	
SIJA		Maca Aero Aerodrome	Tailândia, Pará	02°53′52″S 048°57′30″W	
SIJB		JK Business Centre Heliport	Palmas, Tocantins	10°11′06″S 048°20′15″W	
SIJC		Jatobá Farm Heliport	Santo Antônio de Posse, São Paulo	22°34′59″S 047°02′02″W	
SIJD		João Dias Heliport	São Paulo, São Paulo	23°38′37″S 046°43′04″W	
SIJE		Joana Estate Farm Aerodrome	Corumbá, Mato Grosso do Sul	20°00′50″S 057°23′22″W	
SIJF		Faria Lima Financial Centre Heliport	São Paulo, São Paulo	23°35′10″S 046°41′00″W	
SIJG		Jaguaretê Farm Aerodrome	Guararapes, São Paulo	21°26′33″S 050°43′33″W	
SIJH		Jeep Helipad	Goiana, Pernambuco	07°36′51″S 034°58′09″W	
SIJI		Petrobrás Heliport	São José dos Campos, São Paulo	23°10′57″S 045°49′02″W	
SIJJ		Cambay Farm Aerodrome	Juti, Mato Grosso do Sul	22°40′12″S 054°19′22″W	
SIJK		Capuame Farm Aerodrome	Camaçari, Bahia	12°41′32″S 038°11′48″W	
SIJL		São João da Barra Aerodrome	São João da Barra, Rio de Janeiro	21°38′17″S 041°01′44″W	
SIJM		Tupancy Farm Aerodrome	Sapezal, Mato Grosso	13°27′18″S 058°35′22″W	
SIJN		Pouso na Serra Aerodrome	Bom Retiro, Santa Catarina	27°51′46″S 049°34′43″W	
SIJO		São Sebastião do Jatobazinho Farm Aerodrome	Corumbá, Mato Grosso do Sul	18°34′38″S 057°30′40″W	
SIJP		Bolsa-RJ Heliport	Rio de Janeiro, Rio de Janeiro	22°54′08″S 043°10′27″W	
SIJQ		A2 Aviação Agrícola Aerodrome	Alta Floresta, Mato Grosso	10°04′07″S 055°59′43″W	
SIJR		Ely Rego Aerodrome	Balsa Nova, Paraná	25°32′22″S 049°36′00″W	
SIJS		Tonga Farm Aerodrome	Paragominas, Pará	03°27′17″S 047°31′43″W	
SIJT		Mima 3 Heliport	Campos dos Goytacazes, Rio de Janeiro	21°44′59″S 041°18′10″W	
SIJU		Areia Branca Farm Aerodrome	Juína, Mato Grosso	11°47′26″S 058°27′22″W	
SIJV		Vitória Farm Aerodrome	Rio Verde de Mato Grosso, Mato Grosso do Sul	18°37′20″S 055°06′16″W	
SIJW		Retimar Farm Aerodrome	Iguatemi, Mato Grosso do Sul	23°30′26″S 054°49′05″W	
SIJX		Internacional Plaza Heliport	São Paulo, São Paulo	23°35′29″S 046°40′54″W	
SIJY		Campo Comandantes Aerodrome	Itajaí, Santa Catarina	26°58′59″S 048°48′59″W	
SIJZ		Vera Paz Farm Aerodrome	Itaituba, Pará	07°23′41″S 056°45′53″W	
SIKA		Alegria II Farm Aerodrome	Amambai, Mato Grosso do Sul	23°06′38″S 054°33′29″W	
SIKB		Kekafly I Heliport	Brusque, Santa Catarina	27°04′58″S 048°55′32″W	
SIKC		Copters Heliport	Mairiporã, São Paulo	23°17′57″S 046°35′49″W	
SIKD		SODEPA Heliport	São Paulo, São Paulo	23°34′25″S 046°42′16″W	Closed
SIKE		AERIS II Heliport	Caucaia, Ceará	03°37′13″S 038°50′53″W	
SIKF		Plaza Iguatemi Heliport	São Paulo, São Paulo	23°34′36″S 046°41′12″W	
SIKG		São Miguel Farm Heliport	Ribeirão Branco, São Paulo	24°11′54″S 048°38′34″W	
SIKH		Hotel Vitória Heliport	Indaiatuba, São Paulo	23°05′07″S 047°10′59″W	
SIKI		Cialne Irauçuba Aerodrome	Irauçuba, Ceará	03°45′16″S 039°57′06″W	
SIKJ		JK Farm Aerodrome	Comodoro, Mato Grosso	13°01′57″S 059°55′04″W	
SIKK		Calciolândia Aerodrome	Arcos, Minas Gerais	20°15′02″S 045°38′42″W	
SIKL		Flamboyant Heliport	Goiânia, Goiás	16°42′35″S 049°14′19″W	
SIKM		Viamão Farm	Arame, Maranhão	05°17′21″S 046°00′06″W	
SIKN		Bonanza Farm Aerodrome	Arame, Maranhão	05°09′26″S 045°54′56″W	
SIKO		Água Boa Farm Aerodrome	Anastácio, Mato Grosso do Sul	20°51′43″S 055°38′37″W	
SIKP		Santa Tereza Farm Aerodrome	Corumbá, Mato Grosso do Sul	18°18′13″S 057°30′25″W	
SIKQ		Sararé Farm Aerodrome	Conquista d'Oeste, Mato Grosso	14°47′19″S 059°20′46″W	
SIKR		Barra Mansa Farm Aerodrome	Aquidauana, Mato Grosso do Sul	19°34′53″S 056°05′08″W	
SIKS		Vale do Juruena Farm Aerodrome	Nova Bandeirantes, Mato Grosso	09°24′09″S 058°13′44″W	
SIKT		Joaquim Floriano Heliport	São Paulo, São Paulo	23°34′59″S 046°40′16″W	
SIKU		Gaúcha do Norte Farm Aerodrome	Gaúcha do Norte, Mato Grosso	13°01′53″S 052°58′51″W	
SIKV		Aldeia do Vale Heliport	Goiânia, Goiás	16°36′29″S 049°11′31″W	
SIKW		Vista Linda Farm Aerodrome	Mucuri, Bahia	18°08′49″S 039°35′38″W	
SIKX		Água Boa Farm Aerodrome	Juara, Mato Grosso	11°10′34″S 057°40′08″W	
SIKY		Kekafly III Heliport	Brusque, Santa Catarina	27°06′27″S 048°54′58″W	
SIKZ		Olho d'Agua Farm Aerodrome	Parnarama, Maranhão	05°40′00″S 043°32′06″W	
SILA		Santa Ada Farm Aerodrome	Jateí, Mato Grosso do Sul	22°45′24″S 053°50′25″W	
SILB		Belizário Farm Aerodrome	Riachão das Neves, Bahia	11°31′44″S 045°44′01″W	
SILC	LVR	Bom Futuro Municipal Airport	Lucas do Rio Verde, Mato Grosso	13°02′16″S 055°57′01″W	
SILD		Pachu Aviação Agrícola Aerodrome	Olímpia, São Paulo	20°42′21″S 049°03′05″W	
SILE		Usina Trapiche S/A Heliport	Sirinhaém, Pernambuco	08°34′46″S 035°07′41″W	
SILF		New Century Heliport	São Paulo, São Paulo	23°35′15″S 046°40′49″W	
SILG		Panamá Farm Aerodrome	Sapezal, Mato Grosso	13°45′36″S 058°44′50″W	
SILH		Lytorânea Heliport	Itaguaí, Rio de Janeiro	22°51′46″S 043°44′54″W	
SILI		Santa Clara Farm Aerodrome	Bom Jesus, Piauí	09°11′30″S 045°02′46″W	
SILJ		Do Gaúcho Aerodrome	Laranjal do Jari, Amapá	00°49′55″S 052°30′13″W	
SILK		Estado de São Paulo Heliport	São Paulo, São Paulo	23°30′46″S 046°40′18″W	
SILL		Tabaroa Farm Aerodrome	Águas de Santa Bárbara, São Paulo	22°47′39″S 049°16′13″W	
SILM		Recanto das Marés Heliport	Governador Celso Ramos, Santa Catarina	27°22′41″S 048°31′51″W	
SILN		Rio Negrinho Aerodrome	Rio Negrinho, Santa Catarina	26°19′17″S 049°31′17″W	
SILO		Santa Luzia Farm Aerodrome	Aruanã, Goiás	14°14′56″S 050°52′53″W	
SILP		Lojas Cem Heliport	Salto, São Paulo	23°09′08″S 047°16′03″W	
SILQ		Aeroleve Aerodrome	Cascavel, Paraná	24°55′44″S 053°29′46″W	
SILR		One Hundred Heliport	São Paulo, São Paulo	23°35′41″S 046°41′03″W	Closed
SILS		Big Master Aerodrome	Tangará da Serra, Mato Grosso	14°38′12″S 057°36′29″W	
SILT	SFV	Três Irmãos Farm Aerodrome	Santa Fé do Sul, São Paulo	20°13′40″S 050°58′06″W	
SILU		BRPEC Agro-Pecuária Aerodrome	Miranda, Mato Grosso do Sul	19°51′57″S 056°59′17″W	
SILV		VOCP Heliport	São Paulo, São Paulo	23°35′40″S 046°41′20″W	
SILW		Monte das Acácias Heliport	Gravatá, Pernambuco	08°13′11″S 035°32′41″W	
SILX		Locar Heliport	Guarulhos, São Paulo	23°28′16″S 046°29′00″W	
SILY		Tabuleiro V Aerodrome	Correntina, Bahia	13°14′40″S 045°22′30″W	
SILZ		Santo Expedito IV Farm Aerodrome	Rio Sono, Tocantins	09°50′10″S 047°18′18″W	
SIMA		Pirapora Farm Aerodrome	Santa Rita do Trivelato, Mato Grosso	14°02′51″S 055°23′06″W	
SIMB		Manuel Urbano Aerodrome	Manoel Urbano, Acre	08°50′57″S 069°15′59″W	
SIMC		Punta del Este Heliport	Sertaneja, Paraná	22°48′29″S 050°59′40″W	
SIMD		Resedá Office Heliport	São Paulo, São Paulo	23°34′58″S 046°40′29″W	
SIME		Globo Aviação Agrícola Aerodrome	Davinópolis, Maranhão	05°35′01″S 047°25′38″W	
SIMF		Imperial Farm	Sebastião Leal, Piauí	07°51′01″S 044°04′09″W	
SIMG		Seis Palmas Farm Aerodrome	Porto Murtinho, Mato Grosso do Sul	21°05′32″S 057°43′05″W	
SIMH		Honda Automóveis Heliport	Sumaré, São Paulo	22°50′02″S 047°11′36″W	
SIMI		Marina Igararecê Heliport	São Sebastião, São Paulo	23°46′06″S 045°24′11″W	
SIMJ		Aviação Agrícola Buttarello Aerodrome	Capinópolis, Minas Gerais	18°39′34″S 049°32′51″W	
SIMK	FRC	Franca Airport	Franca, São Paulo	20°35′32″S 047°22′59″W	
SIML		Siriema Farm Aerodrome	Santo Antônio do Leverger, Mato Grosso	15°50′53″S 055°50′19″W	
SIMM		Corporate Park Building Heliport	São Paulo, São Paulo	23°35′15″S 046°40′20″W	
SIMN		Aviação Agrícola Manain Aerodrome	Sinop, Mato Grosso	11°45′14″S 055°21′32″W	
SIMO		Morro Vermelho Farm Aerodrome	Ribeirão Claro, Paraná	23°13′41″S 049°46′40″W	
SIMP		Triunfo Farm Aerodrome	Sonora, Mato Grosso do Sul	17°38′18″S 054°04′43″W	
SIMQ		Dois de Maio Farm Aerodrome	Corumbá, Mato Grosso do Sul	18°12′32″S 055°45′11″W	
SIMR		Reunidas Farms Aerodrome	Rio Verde, Goiás	17°45′03″S 051°09′22″W	
SIMS		Califórnia Farm	Camapuã, Mato Grosso do Sul	19°05′39″S 054°11′12″W	
SIMT		Pedreira Maria Teresa Heliport	São Vicente, São Paulo	23°55′31″S 046°27′42″W	
SIMU		Mutum Farm Aerodrome	Anaurilândia, Mato Grosso do Sul	22°16′43″S 052°50′40″W	
SIMV		Mata Velha Farm Aerodrome	Uberaba, Minas Gerais	19°50′19″S 047°51′01″W	
SIMW		Retiro do Cervo I Farm Aerodrome	Jaraguari, Mato Grosso do Sul	20°20′58″S 053°58′15″W	
SIMX		Jangada Farm Aerodrome	Jangada, Mato Grosso	15°14′27″S 056°34′41″W	
SIMY		Porto Oculto Farm Aerodrome	Itaquiraí, Mato Grosso do Sul	23°12′40″S 054°05′45″W	
SIMZ		Primeiro de Maio Farm Aerodrome	Sonora, Mato Grosso do Sul	17°52′33″S 054°56′30″W	
SINA		Asas do Ar Aerodrome	Brasília, Federal District	15°36′37″S 047°34′26″W	
SINB		Tubarão Heliport	Ilhabela, São Paulo	23°49′46″S 045°23′19″W	
SINC		Campo Nuic Aerodrome	Bom Jardim da Serra, Santa Catarina	28°22′54″S 049°34′09″W	
SIND		Radin Heliport	São Gonçalo do Sapucaí, Minas Gerais	21°53′33″S 045°35′46″W	Closed
SINE		Ibar Heliport	Poá, São Paulo	23°31′27″S 046°19′47″W	
SINF		N&F Heliport	Serra, Espírito Santo	20°13′50″S 040°16′37″W	
SING		São João Farm Aerodrome	Nova Granada, São Paulo	20°33′24″S 049°17′19″W	
SINH		Esperança Farm Aerodrome	Novo Horizonte do Sul, Mato Grosso do Sul	22°38′33″S 053°33′43″W	
SINI		Bela Vista do Caronal Farm Aerodrome	Corumbá, Mato Grosso do Sul	18°12′21″S 055°58′24″W	
SINJ		Tamanduá Bandeira Aerodrome	Ribas do Rio Pardo, Mato Grosso do Sul	20°28′22″S 053°41′34″W	
SINK		Negrinha Farm Aerodrome	Parapuã, São Paulo	21°52′29″S 050°52′23″W	
SINL		Costão Heliport	Florianópolis, Santa Catarina	27°27′49″S 048°22′57″W	
SINM		Mangabas Farm Aerodrome	Santa Vitória, Minas Gerais	19°13′39″S 050°18′50″W	
SINN		Comandante Nelinho Aerodrome	Araranguá, Santa Catarina	28°58′31″S 049°29′22″W	
SINO		Innovare Hotel Heliport	Brusque, Santa Catarina	27°05′46″S 048°54′50″W	
SINP		Santa Maria Farm Aerodrome	Jardim, Mato Grosso do Sul	21°30′29″S 056°25′29″W	
SINQ		Laranjal Aerodrome	Laranjal do Jari, Amapá	00°47′21″S 052°29′17″W	
SINR		Santa Rosa Farm Aerodrome	Cáceres, Mato Grosso	17°03′52″S 057°45′51″W	
SINS		Grupo Nissey Farm Aerodrome	Cáceres, Mato Grosso	16°10′12″S 058°33′25″W	
SINT		Santa Adélia Farm Aerodrome	Santa Isabel, Goiás	15°11′41″S 049°22′46″W	
SINU		Irmãos Hort Heliport	Brusque, Santa Catarina	27°07′02″S 048°56′49″W	
SINV		Nova Baús Farm Aerodrome	Mineiros, Goiás	18°11′17″S 053°05′55″W	
SINW		International Paper Luís Antônio Heliport	Luís Antônio, São Paulo	21°34′20″S 047°55′29″W	Closed
SINX		Morro do Chapeú Heliport	Nova Lima, Minas Gerais	20°06′32″S 043°56′20″W	
SINY		Nova Farm Aerodrome	Brejo da Madre de Deus, Pernambuco	08°09′36″S 036°11′49″W	
SINZ		Xanadu Aerodrome	Fernandes Pinheiro, Paraná	25°26′19″S 050°31′39″W	
SIOA		Primavera Farm Aerodrome	Canavieiras, Bahia	15°34′03″S 039°09′10″W	
SIOB		Guanabara Farm Aerodrome	Andradina, São Paulo	20°49′09″S 051°16′05″W	
SIOC		Santo Expedito Aerodrome	Nova Independência, São Paulo	21°08′35″S 051°32′38″W	
SIOD		DIMEP Heliport	São Paulo, São Paulo	23°31′46″S 046°44′39″W	
SIOE		Mocelin Aerodrome	Dois Vizinhos, Paraná	25°47′38″S 053°02′09″W	
SIOF		Praiamar Heliport	Santos, São Paulo	23°58′43″S 046°18′32″W	
SIOG		Suinobras Aerodrome	Diamantino, Mato Grosso	14°30′26″S 056°18′10″W	
SIOH		Cauê-Ijaci Heliport	Ijaci, Minas Gerais	21°11′40″S 044°56′28″W	
SIOI		Onça Parda Farm Aerodrome	Novo Horizonte do Sul, Mato Grosso do Sul	22°39′45″S 053°43′45″W	
SIOJ		Porto Velho Farm Aerodrome	Carmo do Cajuru, Minas Gerais	20°18′49″S 044°41′47″W	
SIOK		Cachoeirinha Farm Aerodrome	Perdizes, Minas Gerais	19°21′32″S 047°07′43″W	
SIOL		Rio Bonito Farm Aerodrome	Costa Rica, Mato Grosso do Sul\	19°11′59″S 052°58′08″W	
SIOM		Orquídeas Farm Aerodrome	Barreiras, Bahia	11°50′21″S 046°14′04″W	
SION		Tibagi Heliport	Guaramiranga, Ceará	04°15′05″S 038°57′06″W	
SIOO		Água Doce do Pantanal Farm Aerodrome	Porto Murtinho, Mato Grosso do Sul	22°01′33″S 057°54′11″W	
SIOP		Poletto Aerodrome	Santa Rita do Trivelato, Mato Grosso	13°47′57″S 055°16′49″W	
SIOQ		Mato Alto Farm Aerodrome	Iguatemi, Mato Grosso do Sul	23°30′20″S 054°18′34″W	
SIOR		Adhemar Ribeiro Aerodrome	Santa Rita do Passa Quatro, São Paulo	21°38′31″S 047°28′12″W	
SIOS		Santa Josefa Farm Aerodrome	Jateí, Mato Grosso do Sul	22°46′10″S 053°57′26″W	
SIOT		Santa Vergínia Farm Aerodrome	Santa Rita do Pardo, Mato Grosso do Sul	21°29′17″S 052°24′26″W	
SIOU		Progresso Farm Aerodrome	Paragominas, Pará	03°22′23″S 047°25′26″W	
SIOV		Vera Municipal Aerodrome	Vera, Mato Grosso	12°19′09″S 055°20′02″W	Closed
SIOW		Alemão Oswaldo Cruz Hospital Heliport	São Paulo, São Paulo	23°34′11″S 046°38′37″W	
SIOX		Palhano Premium Heliport	Londrina, Paraná	23°20′08″S 051°10′36″W	
SIOY		Santa Clara Farm Heliport	Santana do Deserto, Minas Gerais	21°52′50″S 043°10′33″W	
SIOZ		Kenjdã Village Aerodrome	Altamira, Pará	07°57′24″S 053°15′40″W	
SIPA		São José do Rio Pardo Aeroclub Aerodrome	São José do Rio Pardo, São Paulo	21°38′50″S 046°55′42″W	
SIPB		Clube de Aviação Desportiva Aerodrome	Raposa, Maranhão	02°26′53″S 044°07′11″W	
SIPC		Canto da Praia Heliport	Itapema, Santa Catarina	27°05′37″S 048°36′17″W	
SIPD		Vitória Hotel Residence Heliport	Campinas, São Paulo	22°54′09″S 047°02′54″W	
SIPE		Itapessoca Aerodrome	Goiana, Pernambuco	07°39′22″S 034°51′23″W	
SIPF		Feliz Aerodrome	Feliz, Rio Grande do Sul	29°26′53″S 051°17′43″W	
SIPG		Água Preta Farm Aerodrome	Cocalinho, Mato Grosso	14°08′15″S 051°28′09″W	
SIPH		Ipanema Farm Aerodrome	Correntina, Bahia	13°37′33″S 046°08′23″W	
SIPI		Alphacentro Heliport	Barueri, São Paulo	23°29′53″S 046°51′44″W	
SIPJ		Aero Parque Tupã	Tupanciretã, Rio Grande do Sul	29°05′08″S 053°51′56″W	
SIPK		SESC Pantanal Aerodrome	Poconé, Mato Grosso	16°29′49″S 056°25′18″W	
SIPL		Pykararankre Village Aerodrome	São Félix do Xingu, Pará	07°27′37″S 052°39′25″W	
SIPM		Marrecão Heliport	Brusque, Santa Catarina	27°03′59″S 048°53′29″W	
SIPN		Progresso Farm Aerodrome	Porto Murtinho, Mato Grosso do Sul	21°31′00″S 057°41′26″W	
SIPO		Sebastião José Pereira Aerodrome	Condeúba, Bahia	14°55′26″S 041°57′29″W	
SIPP		Musa do Norte Farm Aerodrome	Francisco Sá, Minas Gerais	16°07′24″S 043°31′12″W	
SIPQ		Office Park Heliport	Cabo de Santo Agostinho, Pernambuco	08°15′18″S 034°56′52″W	
SIPR		GAP São Pedro Farm Aerodrome	Uruguaiana, Rio Grande do Sul	30°01′33″S 056°18′10″W	
SIPS		Haras Forum Heliport	Pedro Leopoldo, Minas Gerais	19°39′32″S 044°08′49″W	
SIPT		Petrobrás Paulínia–Replan Refinery Heliport	Paulínia, São Paulo	22°43′55″S 047°08′16″W	
SIPU		Guatambu Piauí Aerodrome	Santa Rita de Cássia, Bahia	10°35′54″S 044°23′17″W	
SIPV		Santa Vitória Mato Grosso Farm Aerodrome	Tabaporã, Mato Grosso	11°25′10″S 055°49′01″W	
SIPW		Our Lady of Fatima Aerodrome	Teresina, Piauí	05°01′55″S 042°42′20″W	
SIPX		Gramado Heliport	Campinas, São Paulo	22°54′27″S 047°00′13″W	
SIPY		Pykatô Village Aerodrome	Cumaru do Norte, Pará	08°28′31″S 051°39′49″W	
SIPZ		Papaiz Heliport	Diadema, São Paulo	23°40′35″S 046°37′05″W	
SIQA		Bela Vista Farm Aerodrome	Ribas do Rio Pardo, Mato Grosso do Sul	20°23′17″S 053°22′24″W	
SIQB		Vila Velha Heliport	Angra dos Reis, Rio de Janeiro	23°01′28″S 044°20′34″W	
SIQC		Paraíso Farm Aerodrome	Costa Rica, Mato Grosso do Sul	19°09′26″S 052°59′45″W	
SIQD		Regina Estate Farm Aerodrome	Terenos, Mato Grosso do Sul	20°38′27″S 054°47′26″W	
SIQE		Planalto Central Aerodrome	São Sebastião, Federal District	15°56′14″S 047°43′38″W	
SIQF		Palmital Farm Aerodrome	Morro Agudo, São Paulo	20°41′46″S 048°17′13″W	
SIQG		Guanandy Farm Aerodrome	Ponta Porã, Mato Grosso do Sul	21°52′52″S 055°32′22″W	
SIQH		Ayrton Senna Estate Aerodrome	Caarapó, Mato Grosso do Sul	22°39′32″S 054°49′20″W	
SIQI		Aerolis Aerodrome	Mostardas, Rio Grande do Sul	30°32′10″S 050°28′02″W	
SIQJ		Morro do Chapéu II Aerodrome	Chapada dos Guimarães, Mato Grosso	14°57′30″S 055°48′03″W	
SIQK		Nova Odessa Aerodrome	Nova Odessa, São Paulo	22°46′53″S 047°20′03″W	
SIQL		Cacoal Tradição Heliport	Cacoal, Rondônia	11°26′30″S 061°28′51″W	
SIQM		Morumbi Corporate Heliport	São Paulo, São Paulo	23°37′30″S 046°42′07″W	
SIQN		Chica Doce Heliport	Pindoretama, Ceará	04°02′38″S 038°19′40″W	
SIQO		Santa Glória Farm Aerodrome	Corumbá, Mato Grosso do Sul	18°02′23″S 056°00′20″W	
SIQP		Pedra Caída Heliport	Carolina, Maranhão	07°02′27″S 047°26′35″W	
SIQQ		José Bernardo Aerodrome	São Francisco de Itabapoana, Rio de Janeiro	21°27′32″S 041°03′12″W	
SIQR		Pioneira Farm Aerodrome	Querência, Mato Grosso	12°06′10″S 052°26′04″W	
SIQS		Terra do Sol Farm Aerodrome	Porto Estrela, Mato Grosso	15°22′35″S 057°07′47″W	
SIQT		Quinta da Baroneza I Heliport	Bragança Paulista, São Paulo	22°58′38″S 046°42′14″W	Closed
SIQU		Alcoolvale Aerodrome	Aparecida do Taboado, Mato Grosso do Sul	20°05′11″S 051°18′33″W	
SIQV		Matão Farm Aerodrome	Sapezal, Mato Grosso	12°53′28″S 058°34′30″W	
SIQW		Concrelagos Heliport	Itaperuna, Rio de Janeiro	21°11′34″S 041°54′13″W	
SIQX		São Braz Farm Aerodrome	Barra de Santo Antônio, Alagoas	09°22′23″S 035°32′24″W	
SIQY		Amizade Farm Aerodrome	Sorriso, Mato Grosso	12°37′41″S 055°56′42″W	
SIQZ		Lagoa Serena Farm Aerodrome	Lagoa Alegre, Piauí	04°35′53″S 042°35′33″W	
SIRA		Iracema Farm Aerodrome	Cáceres, Mato Grosso	16°04′46″S 058°05′46″W	
SIRB		Mendes Heliport	Santos, São Paulo	23°57′35″S 046°20′08″W	Closed
SIRC		Sinuelo Ranch Aerodrome	Caracol, Mato Grosso do Sul	22°06′47″S 057°03′32″W	
SIRD		Gaelo Aerodrome	Charqueadas, Rio Grande do Sul	29°58′33″S 051°37′13″W	
SIRE		Retiro da Lagoa Farm Heliport	Paraopeba, Minas Gerais	19°15′58″S 044°31′20″W	
SIRF		José Múcio Monteiro Aerodrome	Rio Formoso, Pernambuco	08°37′51″S 035°16′19″W	
SIRG		Ninho do Pássaro Heliport	Navegantes, Santa Catarina	26°52′23″S 048°40′00″W	
SIRH		Morada da Lua Farm Aerodrome	Coxim, Mato Grosso do Sul	18°15′49″S 054°18′43″W	
SIRI	MUU	Barra Grande Airport	Maraú, Bahia	13°54′22″S 038°56′24″W	
SIRJ		Caima Aerodrome	Itaituba, Pará	04°18′13″S 056°13′05″W	
SIRK		Pronto Socorro João XXIII Hospital Heliport	Belo Horizonte, Minas Gerais	19°55′33″S 043°55′53″W	
SIRL		Virginia Lyra Heliport	Conceição das Alagoas, Minas Gerais	19°58′57″S 048°15′54″W	
SIRM		Couto Magalhães Farm Aerodrome	Água Boa, Mato Grosso	13°59′42″S 052°56′04″W	
SIRN		Jaó Farm Aerodrome	Nova Xavantina, Mato Grosso	14°46′09″S 051°59′09″W	
SIRO		Maksoud Plaza Heliport	São Paulo, São Paulo	23°33′47″S 046°39′04″W	
SIRP		All Park Polo Empresarial Heliport	Aparecida de Goiânia, Goiás	16°49′30″S 049°12′13″W	
SIRQ		Ouro Verde Farm Aerodrome	Porto Alegre do Norte, Mato Grosso	10°36′56″S 051°58′50″W	
SIRR		Ecotur Univini Park Aerodrome	Caracaraí, Roraima	00°48′05″N 061°39′38″W	
SIRS		São Sebastião Farm Aerodrome	Campo Florido, Minas Gerais	19°38′12″S 048°47′19″W	
SIRT		Pampeira 3 Farm Aerodrome	Diamantino, Mato Grosso	13°55′38″S 057°14′34″W	
SIRU		Trio Ribeirão Condominium Heliport	Ribeirão Preto, São Paulo	21°11′59″S 047°48′27″W	
SIRV		Morro Branco Farm Aerodrome	Porto Esperidião, Mato Grosso	16°07′06″S 058°45′58″W	
SIRW		Porto Walter Aerodrome	Porto Walter, Acre	08°16′18″S 072°44′43″W	
SIRX		Santo Reis Farm Aerodrome	Lambari d'Oeste, Mato Grosso	15°16′51″S 057°47′38″W	
SIRY		Hiper-Bergamini Heliport	São Paulo, São Paulo	23°27′57″S 046°34′55″W	
SIRZ		Faria Lima–Pinheiros Condominium Heliport	São Paulo, São Paulo	23°34′10″S 046°41′28″W	
SISA		Aukre Village Aerodrome	Ourilândia do Norte, Pará	07°41′51″S 051°52′34″W	
SISB		Basalto Base 6 Heliport	Campinas, São Paulo	23°00′14″S 047°05′18″W	
SISC		Senador Carlos Lyra Heliport	Delta, Minas Gerais	19°57′26″S 047°46′08″W	
SISD		São Sebastião Farm Aerodrome	Aparecida do Rio Doce, Goiás	18°08′43″S 051°16′26″W	
SISE		Sementes Roos Heliport	Não-Me-Toque, Rio Grande do Sul	28°26′36″S 052°48′50″W	
SISF		Cifarma Heliport	Goiânia, Goiás	16°37′52″S 049°12′03″W	
SISG		Sergipe Aeroclub Aerodrome	Aracaju, Sergipe	10°54′05″S 037°04′59″W	
SISH		Vega Heliport	Fortaleza, Ceará	03°43′12″S 038°32′32″W	
SISI		Monte Sinai IV Heliport	Bauru, São Paulo	22°19′29″S 049°04′30″W	
SISJ		São José do Piquiri Farm Aerodrome	Corumbá, Mato Grosso do Sul	17°27′23″S 055°33′51″W	
SISK		Cimal Farm Aerodrome	Aporé, Goiás	18°51′53″S 052°02′50″W	
SISL		Santa Lúcia Farm Aerodrome	Barão de Melgaço, Mato Grosso	16°53′40″S 055°54′23″W	
SISM		Sérgio Miranda Aerodrome	Macapá, Amapá	00°02′25″N 051°08′58″W	
SISN		Valiosa Farm Aerodrome	Brasilândia de Minas, Minas Gerais	17°04′00″S 045°52′00″W	
SISO		Santo Ambrósio Farm Aerodrome	Chaves, Pará	00°05′30″S 049°34′42″W	
SISP		Reobot Heliport	Jarinu, São Paulo	23°09′28″S 046°39′45″W	
SISQ		Tino Heliport	Joinville, Santa Catarina	26°18′23″S 048°56′00″W	
SISR		Reunidas Sococo Farm Aerodrome	Santa Izabel do Pará, Pará	01°13′26″S 048°02′29″W	
SISS		Vô Amantino Aerodrome	Cláudia, Mato Grosso	11°39′17″S 055°14′20″W	
SIST		Zizico Heliport	Pontal do Paraná, Paraná	25°41′01″S 048°27′37″W	Closed
SISU		Topázio Imperial Farm Aerodrome	Gameleiras, Minas Gerais	14°58′02″S 043°18′53″W	
SISV		Promissão Farm Aerodrome	Diamantino, Mato Grosso	13°53′48″S 057°06′13″W	
SISW		Mato Grosso Farm Aerodrome	Campos de Júlio, Mato Grosso	13°50′15″S 059°09′53″W	
SISX		Santa Terezinha Aerodrome	Aquidauana, Mato Grosso do Sul	19°22′38″S 056°03′22″W	
SISY		Piraquara Aerodrome	Piraquara, Paraná	25°27′03″S 049°08′30″W	
SISZ		São José Farm Aerodrome	Couto de Magalhães, Tocantins	08°30′45″S 049°22′37″W	
SITA		Taiobeiras Municipal Aerodrome	Taiobeiras, Minas Gerais	15°46′35″S 042°11′39″W	
SITB		Touro Branco Farm Aerodrome	Naviraí, Mato Grosso do Sul	23°00′51″S 053°47′15″W	
SITC		Colorado Farm Aerodrome	Sorriso, Mato Grosso	13°07′56″S 055°26′43″W	
SITD		Fundação Santa Casa de Misericórdia do Pará Heliport	Belém, Pará	01°26′23″S 048°28′54″W	
SITE		Telefônica Heliport	São Paulo, São Paulo	23°33′59″S 046°38′33″W	Closed
SITF		Tereré Farm Aerodrome	Antônio João, Mato Grosso do Sul	22°21′39″S 055°45′28″W	
SITG		INTO Heliport	Rio de Janeiro, Rio de Janeiro	22°53′38″S 043°12′54″W	
SITH		Vitória Farm Aerodrome	Luís Eduardo Magalhães, Bahia	12°09′04″S 045°52′16″W	
SITI		Baluarte Farm Aerodrome	Lagoa dos Patos, Minas Gerais	17°00′54″S 044°47′29″W	
SITJ		Tejo Estate Aerodrome	Coxim, Mato Grosso do Sul	18°20′41″S 054°46′02″W	
SITK		Jomarca Heliport	Guarulhos, São Paulo	23°28′02″S 046°29′09″W	
SITL		Figueira II Farm Aerodrome	Água Clara, Mato Grosso do Sul	20°10′02″S 053°04′15″W	
SITM		Bela Vista Farm Aerodrome	Panorama, São Paulo	21°25′03″S 051°53′40″W	
SITN		Oscar Niemeyer Tower Heliport	Rio de Janeiro, Rio de Janeiro	22°56′27″S 043°10′47″W	
SITO		Berrini One Heliport	São Paulo, São Paulo	23°35′54″S 046°41′26″W	
SITP		Sítio Santa Izabel Heliport	Ibiúna, São Paulo	23°36′09″S 047°16′24″W	
SITQ		Vivo S/A Heliport	São Paulo, São Paulo	23°37′13″S 046°41′57″W	
SITR		Tamboril Farm Aerodrome	Bom Jesus de Goiás, Goiás	18°05′59″S 049°44′14″W	
SITS		Vovô Ernesto Aerodrome	Lucas do Rio Verde, Mato Grosso	13°07′49″S 055°58′56″W	
SITT		Independência Aerodrome	Itaituba, Pará	07°35′39″S 056°41′58″W	
SITU		Santa Genoveva Farm Aerodrome	Turvelândia, Goiás	17°56′42″S 050°20′18″W	
SITV		Serra Dourada Farm Aerodrome	Coxim, Mato Grosso do Sul	18°32′42″S 054°27′34″W	
SITW		Reserva Mangabeiras Heliport	Estância, Sergipe	11°14′56″S 037°20′11″W	
SITX		Estrela do Sul Farm Aerodrome	Rio Brilhante, Mato Grosso do Sul	21°47′37″S 054°05′08″W	
SITY		Santapazienza Farm Heliport	Itatiba, São Paulo	23°04′06″S 046°49′36″W	Closed
SITZ		ITC Central Park I Heliport	Fortaleza, Ceará	03°44′21″S 038°28′24″W	
SIUA		Águas Claras Aerodrome	Viamão, Rio Grande do Sul	30°07′09″S 050°51′13″W	
SIUB		Uberaba Farm Aerodrome	Cáceres, Mato Grosso	17°16′31″S 057°53′48″W	
SIUC		Campo Grande Farm Aerodrome	Januária, Minas Gerais	15°10′44″S 045°13′29″W	
SIUD		Monte Horebe Heliport	São Paulo, São Paulo	23°32′19″S 046°36′27″W	
SIUE		Suape Heliport	Ipojuca, Pernambuco	08°21′48″S 035°00′31″W	
SIUF		São Francisco Farm Aerodrome	Peixoto de Azevedo, Mato Grosso	10°09′24″S 053°42′06″W	
SIUG		Santa Irene Farm Aerodrome	Sandovalina, São Paulo	22°29′42″S 051°54′34″W	
SIUH		Flores Farm Aerodrome	Tamboril, Ceará	05°02′57″S 040°14′03″W	
SIUI		ITH Heliport	Juiz de Fora, Minas Gerais	21°46′52″S 043°21′40″W	
SIUJ		The One Office Tower Heliport	São José dos Campos, São Paulo	23°13′13″S 045°54′39″W	
SIUK		Cruz Heliport	Lauro de Freitas, Bahia	12°51′26″S 038°19′01″W	
SIUL		KL Aviação Agrícola Aerodrome	Camaquã, Rio Grande do Sul	30°51′33″S 051°46′21″W	
SIUM		Planeste Farm Aerodrome	Balsas, Maranhão	08°33′41″S 046°50′51″W	
SIUN		Porto Itaguaí Helicentre Heliport	Itaguaí, Rio de Janeiro	22°53′30″S 043°50′37″W	
SIUO		Santa Adélia Farm Aerodrome	São José do Xingu, Mato Grosso	10°43′14″S 052°16′44″W	
SIUP		Virá Farm Inn Heliport	Teixeira Soares, Paraná	25°23′20″S 050°32′35″W	
SIUQ		Alegre Ranch Farm Aerodrome	Cocalinho, Mato Grosso	12°46′34″S 050°55′34″W	
SIUR		Ribeirão Farm Aerodrome	Camapuã, Mato Grosso do Sul	19°36′35″S 053°29′47″W	
SIUS		Santana Farm Aerodrome	Formosa do Rio Preto, Bahia	11°12′50″S 045°51′07″W	
SIUU		Santa Eulália Farm Aerodrome	Poconé, Mato Grosso	16°31′04″S 057°02′28″W	
SIUV		Vianmacel Farm Aerodrome	Nova Maringá, Mato Grosso	12°12′34″S 057°27′10″W	
SIUW		Comandante Milton Tosto Aerodrome	Bonito, Bahia	12°00′20″S 041°18′16″W	
SIUX		Quimigel Heliport	Monte Mor, São Paulo	22°57′53″S 047°19′14″W	
SIUY		Jair Feliciano de Deus Aerodrome	Mirassol d'Oeste, Mato Grosso	15°41′34″S 058°06′30″W	
SIUZ		Bom Jesus Aerodrome	Itaituba, Pará	05°27′13″S 057°27′17″W	
SIVA		Ilha do Cavaco Heliport	Angra dos Reis, Rio de Janeiro	23°00′49″S 044°16′02″W	
SIVB		South Zone Helicentre Heliport	Belo Horizonte, Minas Gerais	19°59′08″S 043°57′54″W	
SIVC		Vicente Spisso Heliport	Vargem Grande Paulista, São Paulo	23°36′40″S 047°00′02″W	
SIVD		Agropecuária Santa Rita Aerodrome	Rio Verde de Mato Grosso, Mato Grosso do Sul	19°00′22″S 055°00′05″W	
SIVE		Vokkan Vivapark Heliport	Porto Belo, Santa Catarina	27°09′41″S 048°36′18″W	
SIVF		Santa Cruz Farm Aerodrome	Querência, Mato Grosso	11°39′02″S 052°44′12″W	
SIVG		Selva Aerosporting Club Aerodrome	Sinop, Mato Grosso	11°52′33″S 055°26′39″W	
SIVH		Sítio Santa Chiara Heliport	Orlândia, São Paulo	20°42′18″S 047°52′52″W	
SIVI		Monte Sinai Heliport	Campinas, São Paulo	22°54′46″S 047°03′51″W	
SIVJ		Cirrus Aerosporting Society Aerodrome	Jaboticatubas, Minas Gerais	19°27′10″S 043°53′59″W	
SIVK		Ilha Verde Farm Aerodrome	Corumbá, Mato Grosso do Sul	17°17′17″S 055°53′43″W	
SIVL		Del Rio Heliport	Maracanaú, Ceará	03°51′56″S 038°35′34″W	
SIVM		Gold Star Heliport	Nipoã, São Paulo	20°54′02″S 049°47′13″W	
SIVN		Sansara Farm Aerodrome	Montes Claros, Minas Gerais	16°36′00″S 043°46′00″W	
SIVO		Malu Farm Aerodrome	Bom Jesus do Araguaia, Mato Grosso	12°26′53″S 051°46′27″W	
SIVP		Bela Manhã Aerodrome	Nova Crixás, Goiás	14°26′27″S 050°32′09″W	
SIVQ		Aeroquadra Flying Club Aerodrome	Quadra, São Paulo	23°18′53″S 048°01′48″W	
SIVR		Fortuna Farm Aerodrome	Jacareacanga, Pará	09°09′58″S 056°54′56″W	
SIVS		Villa San Marco Heliport	Campos do Jordão, São Paulo	22°45′03″S 045°33′14″W	
SIVT		Chaperó Heliport	Itaguaí, Rio de Janeiro	22°50′33″S 043°45′50″W	
SIVU		João Monteiro Aerodrome	Vila Velha, Espírito Santo	20°25′23″S 040°19′57″W	
SIVV		Borereo Farm Aerodrome	Barão de Melgaço, Mato Grosso	16°55′39″S 056°13′59″W	
SIVW		Banaer de Jacupiranga Aerodrome	Jacupiranga, São Paulo	24°42′36″S 048°01′26″W	
SIVX		Brazilian Aluminum Company Heliport	Alumínio, São Paulo	23°31′00″S 047°16′00″W	
SIVY		Vale do Boi II Farm Aerodrome	São Félix do Araguaia, Mato Grosso	11°40′15″S 052°05′41″W	
SIVZ		Mata-Fome Aerodromee	Itaqui, Rio Grande do Sul	29°11′27″S 056°32′55″W	
SIWA		Estrela do Aripuanã Farm Aerodrome	Aripuanã, Mato Grosso	10°44′55″S 059°22′28″W	
SIWB		Sperafico Farm Aerodrome	Amambai, Mato Grosso do Sul	23°11′25″S 055°17′12″W	
SIWC		Asas do Cerrado Aerodrome	Uberlândia, Minas Gerais	19°01′59″S 048°18′25″W	
SIWD		Pequena Holanda I Aerodrome	Alto Parnaíba, Maranhão	09°00′33″S 046°08′11″W	
SIWE		Nelson Pizzani Airport	Monte Carlo, Santa Catarina	27°12′46″S 050°57′23″W	
SIWF		YBYTU Heliport	Sapucaí-Mirim, Minas Gerais	22°44′10″S 045°46′31″W	
SIWG		Ycatu Heliport	Amparo, São Paulo	22°38′31″S 046°48′46″W	
SIWH		Francisco Lázaro da Silveira Aerodrome	Coromandel, Minas Gerais	18°28′54″S 047°13′36″W	
SIWI		Miriti Internacional Golfe Marina Heliport	Marituba, Pará	01°20′19″S 048°19′07″W	
SIWJ		Parque Ana Costa Heliport	Santos, São Paulo	23°57′49″S 046°19′53″W	
SIWK		Moykarako Village Aerodrome	São Félix do Xingu, Pará	07°26′04″S 051°49′01″W	
SIWL		Alceu Feldmann Heliport	Bombinhas, Santa Catarina	27°11′26″S 048°30′20″W	
SIWM		Magnum Residence Heliport	Araçoiaba da Serra, São Paulo	23°30′37″S 047°34′45″W	
SIWN		Vargem das Flores Farm Aerodrome	Goiatuba, Goiás	17°50′52″S 049°34′56″W	
SIWO		Juliana Farm Aerodrome	Chupinguaia, Rondônia	12°40′57″S 061°05′20″W	
SIWP		Siframar Heliport	Itapema, Santa Catarina	27°07′03″S 048°36′31″W	
SIWQ		Mateira Farm Aerodrome	Santa Rita do Pardo, Mato Grosso do Sul	20°57′43″S 053°04′14″W	
SIWR		Amazonas Farm Aerodrome	Nova Crixás, Goiás	13°48′03″S 050°29′25″W	
SIWS		Hotel Portobello Heliport	Mangaratiba, Rio de Janeiro	22°56′57″S 044°04′28″W	
SIWT		Santa Terezinha I Farm Aerodrome	Santa Terezinha, Mato Grosso	10°21′43″S 050°36′37″W	
SIWU		São Sebastião Farm Aerodrome	Aquidauana, Mato Grosso do Sul	19°21′31″S 056°24′42″W	
SIWV		Tenente Brigadeiro Ar Waldir de Vasconcelos Aerodrome	Rio de Janeiro, Rio de Janeiro	22°59′01″S 043°22′37″W	
SIWW		Barreiros Farm Aerodrome	Ilhabela, São Paulo	23°45′56″S 045°20′52″W	
SIWX		Comil Farm Aerodrome	Sapezal, Mato Grosso	13°55′34″S 058°53′00″W	
SIWY		Campo Augusta Farm Aerodrome	Corumbá, Mato Grosso do Sul	17°30′46″S 055°46′23″W	
SIWZ		Fazendinha Farm Aerodrome	Aquidauana, Mato Grosso do Sul	19°28′50″S 056°29′03″W	
SIXA		União Suzanápolis Farm Aerodrome	Suzanápolis, São Paulo	20°31′54″S 051°05′30″W	
SIXB		Cambara Farm Aerodrome	Porto dos Gaúchos, Mato Grosso	11°37′10″S 056°33′41″W	
SIXC		Embrase Heliport	São Paulo, São Paulo	23°30′38″S 046°41′35″W	Closed
SIXD		Fazenda da Paz Aerodrome	Santana do Livramento, Rio Grande do Sul	30°50′40″S 055°34′05″W	
SIXE		Eldorado do Sul Aeroclub Aerodrome	Eldorado do Sul, Rio Grande do Sul	30°03′01″S 051°26′37″W	
SIXF		Lageado Farm Aerodrome	Três Lagoas, Mato Grosso do Sul	20°59′50″S 052°10′08″W	
SIXG		Pouso Alegre Farm Aerodrome	Catalão, Goiás	18°01′51″S 047°27′45″W	
SIXH		Unimed Joinville Hospital Heliport	Joinville, Santa Catarina	26°17′20″S 048°50′44″W	
SIXI		Kokraymoro Village Aerodrome	São Félix do Xingu, Pará	07°12′37″S 052°34′11″W	
SIXJ		Volare Helicentro Heliport	Divinópolis, Minas Gerais	20°09′58″S 044°55′07″W	
SIXK		Our Lady of Carmo Aerodrome	Itaquiraí, Mato Grosso do Sul	23°10′03″S 054°12′08″W	
SIXL		Barra do Triunfo Farm Aerodrome	São Félix do Xingu, Pará	06°24′58″S 052°22′50″W	
SIXM		Cifi Aerodrome	Cuiabá, Mato Grosso	15°38′37″S 055°59′24″W	
SIXN		Txai Resort Heliport	Itacaré, Bahia	14°22′40″S 039°00′40″W	
SIXO		Our Lady of Fatima Farm Aerodrome	Comodoro, Mato Grosso	13°59′00″S 059°39′16″W	
SIXP		Pretel 88 Heliport	Itaí, São Paulo	23°41′26″S 049°06′12″W	
SIXQ		Ford Camaçari Heliport	Camaçari, Bahia	12°40′25″S 038°16′24″W	
SIXR		Santa Maria III Farm Aerodrome	Coxim, Mato Grosso do Sul	18°24′08″S 054°27′07″W	
SIXS		EZ Towers A Heliport	São Paulo, São Paulo	23°37′37″S 046°42′09″W	
SIXT		Santa Isabel Farm Aerodrome	Aquidauana, Mato Grosso do Sul	19°55′39″S 055°40′19″W	
SIXU		Bahia Farm Aerodrome	Pedra Preta, Mato Grosso	16°55′33″S 054°04′17″W	
SIXV		Planalto Ranch Farm Aerodrome	Alcinópolis, Mato Grosso do Sul	18°08′44″S 053°21′49″W	
SIXW		Cana Brava Heliport	Arandu, São Paulo	23°12′34″S 049°06′49″W	
SIXX		Triunfo Farm Santo Antônio Retreat Aerodrome	Corumbá, Mato Grosso do Sul	17°53′33″S 056°59′51″W	
SIXY		Lunelli Heliport	Guaramirim, Santa Catarina	26°28′23″S 048°59′24″W	
SIXZ		Colniza Aerodrome	Colniza, Mato Grosso	09°26′47″S 059°11′57″W	
SIYA		Taquari Aeroclub Aerodrome	Vilhena, Rondônia	12°47′30″S 060°10′18″W	
SIYB		Aquidabã Commercial Heliport	Campinas, São Paulo	22°54′40″S 047°03′18″W	
SIYC		Cesaroni Heliport	Lauro de Freitas, Bahia	12°51′33″S 038°19′02″W	
SIYD		Curitiba Farm Aerodrome	Comodoro, Mato Grosso	13°32′48″S 060°25′06″W	
SIYE		Barra do Agudo Farm Aerodrome	Morro Agudo, São Paulo	20°48′37″S 048°13′22″W	
SIYF		São José Farm Aerodrome	Serranópolis, Goiás	18°13′59″S 052°17′39″W	
SIYG		Specialty Fats and Margarines Heliport	Fortaleza, Ceará	03°43′09″S 038°28′27″W	
SIYH		Cruzeiro Farm Aerodrome	Rio Verde de Mato Grosso, Mato Grosso do Sul	18°58′55″S 055°17′30″W	
SIYI		Planalto Farm Aerodrome	Montividiu, Goiás	17°15′50″S 051°09′06″W	
SIYJ		Avenida Sul Heliport	Recife, Pernambuco	08°04′00″S 034°54′05″W	
SIYK		Sorriso Metálico Farm	Urutaí, Goiás	17°27′24″S 048°12′55″W	
SIYL		National Shrine of Our Lady of the Conception Heliport	Aparecida, São Paulo	22°51′14″S 045°14′16″W	
SIYM		Montesion Farm Aerodrome	Toledo, Paraná	24°53′06″S 053°45′27″W	
SIYN		Recanto dos Mouras Aerodrome	Afogados da Ingazeira, Pernambuco	07°45′53″S 037°35′49″W	
SIYO		Goiás Barreiro Farm Aerodrome	Montividiu, Goiás	17°15′20″S 051°18′23″W	
SIYP		Empresarial Delman Heliport	Maceió, Alagoas	09°40′26″S 035°43′07″W	
SIYQ		Senado Corporate Centre Heliport	Rio de Janeiro, Rio de Janeiro	22°54′38″S 043°11′10″W	
SIYR		Rosa de Maio Farm Aerodrome	Itaituba, Pará	04°19′02″S 056°06′33″W	
SIYS		Sertaneja Farm Aerodrome	Ananás, Tocantins	06°13′33″S 048°15′07″W	
SIYT		Itaim Office Tower Heliport	São Paulo, São Paulo	23°34′52″S 046°40′46″W	
SIYU		Ronaldo Sampaio Ferreira Building Heliport	São Paulo, São Paulo	23°36′06″S 046°41′31″W	
SIYV		Mário Henrique Simonsen Heliport	Rio de Janeiro, Rio de Janeiro	22°59′48″S 043°20′47″W	
SIYW		Estrela Farm Aerodrome	Lábrea, Amazonas	09°32′15″S 065°43′52″W	
SIYX		Tereré Farm Aerodrome	Porto Murtinho, Mato Grosso do Sul	21°20′30″S 057°50′50″W	
SIYY		SLDM Heliport	Santaluz, Bahia	11°00′10″S 039°17′40″W	
SIYZ		Berrini 1681 Condominium Heliport	São Paulo, São Paulo	23°36′41″S 046°41′40″W	
SIZA		Serra Azul Farm Aerodrome	Planalto da Serra, Mato Grosso	14°40′05″S 054°34′08″W	
SIZB		São José Hospital Heliport	Teresópolis, Rio de Janeiro	22°25′30″S 042°58′48″W	
SIZC		Cachoeira do Café Farm Aerodrome	Formosa do Rio Preto, Bahia	11°16′25″S 045°36′50″W	
SIZD		Drop Zone 47 Aerodrome	Tijucas, Santa Catarina	27°17′17″S 048°39′29″W	
SIZE		Coppersteel Bimetálicos Heliport	Campinas, São Paulo	22°59′48″S 047°07′25″W	
SIZG		Santo André II Farm Aerodrome	Nova Maringá, Mato Grosso	12°37′54″S 057°17′45″W	
SIZH		Vista Alegre Farm Aerodrome	Aparecida do Taboado, Mato Grosso do Sul	19°59′47″S 051°30′51″W	
SIZI		Agrícola Godoy Farm Aerodrome	Catalão, Goiás	17°37′03″S 047°31′37″W	
SIZJ		Santa Zélia Farm Aerodrome	Bebedouro, São Paulo	20°58′46″S 048°26′50″W	
SIZK		Vera Cruz Farm Aerodrome	Barra do Garças, Mato Grosso	14°52′30″S 052°06′37″W	
SIZL		Lagoa Farm Aerodrome	São Pedro do Turvo, São Paulo	22°44′52″S 049°50′41″W	
SIZM		Mocelin II Aerodrome	Dois Vizinhos, Paraná	25°41′04″S 053°04′04″W	
SIZN		Lagoa Nova Farm Aerodrome	Damianópolis, Goiás	14°27′51″S 046°18′17″W	
SIZO		Calcário Vale do Araguaia Aerodrome	Cocalinho, Mato Grosso	14°11′25″S 051°38′38″W	
SIZP		Gaúcha do Norte Aerodrome	Gaúcha do Norte, Mato Grosso	13°09′22″S 053°15′02″W	
SIZQ		Real Farm Aerodrome	Botucatu, São Paulo	23°02′12″S 048°26′28″W	
SIZR		Águas Claras Farm Aerodrome	Iguatemi, Mato Grosso do Sul	23°20′10″S 054°30′31″W	
SIZS		Agropecuária Equus Aerodrome	Gaúcha do Norte, Mato Grosso	13°32′16″S 053°26′21″W	
SIZT		Taxaquara Golf Club Aerodrome	São Roque, São Paulo	23°31′25″S 047°05′17″W	
SIZU		Agrochapada Aerodrome	Paranatinga, Mato Grosso	13°26′09″S 054°16′36″W	
SIZV		Sada Heliport	Betim, Minas Gerais	19°57′35″S 044°07′03″W	
SIZW		Portal do Porto Heliport	São José dos Pinhais, Paraná	25°30′52″S 049°07′55″W	
SIZX	JUA	Inácio Luís do Nascimento Airport	Juara, Mato Grosso	11°17′48″S 057°32′56″W	
SIZY		IMOCOP Heliport	Piracicaba, São Paulo	22°41′45″S 047°33′43″W	
SIZZ		Zezé Heliport	Jundiaí, São Paulo	23°07′42″S 047°00′12″W	
