= Lucio Mosquini =

Brazilian politician

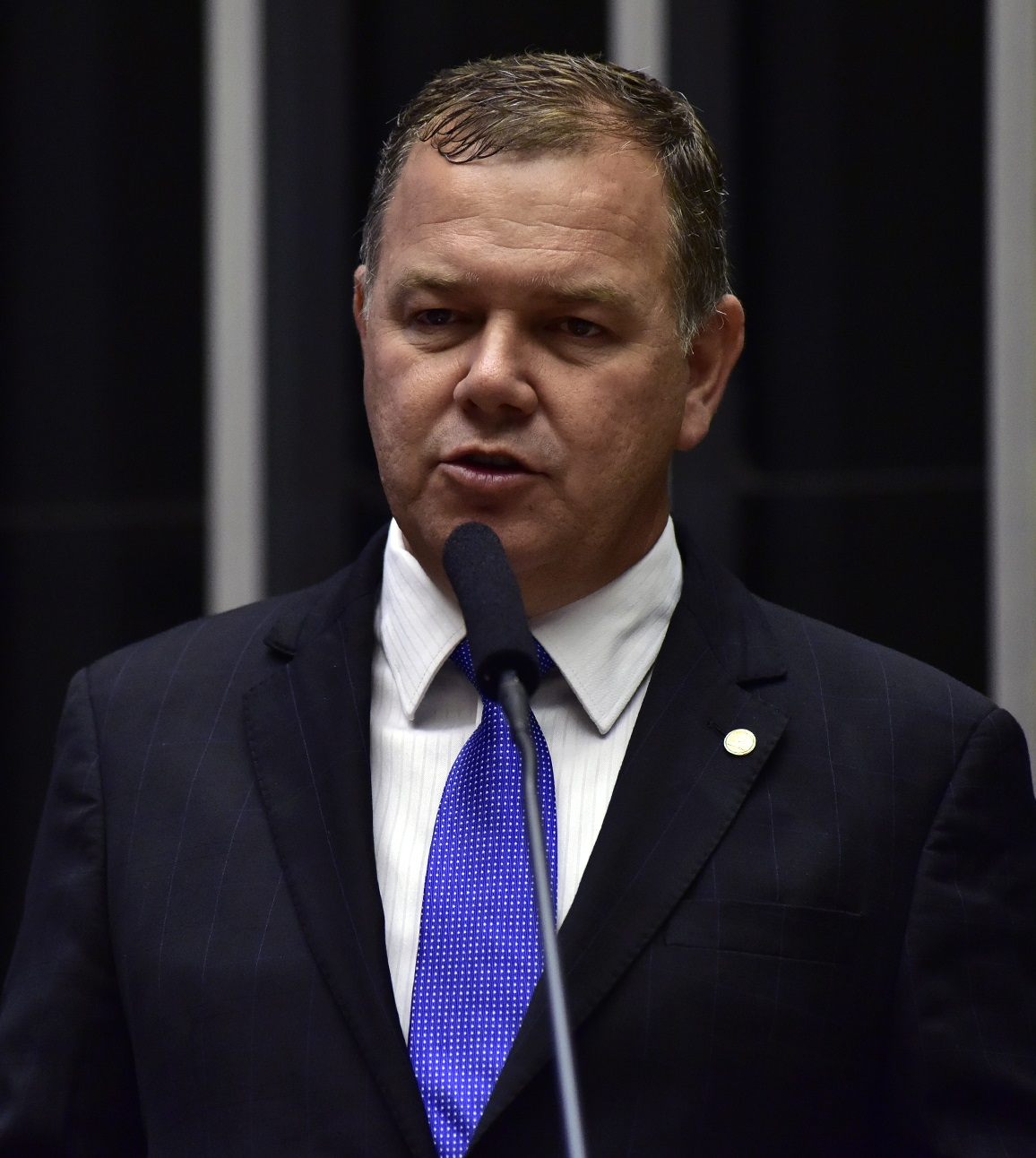
- Mosquini in April 2016

Federal Deputy for Rondônia
- Incumbent
- Assumed office 1 February 2015

Personal details
- Born: 23 July 1969 (age 57) Rondonópolis, Mato Grosso, Brazil
- Party: PL

Lucio Antonio Mosquini (born 23 July 1969) is a Brazilian politician and electrical engineer. Although born in Mato Grosso, he has spent his political career representing Rondônia, having served as state representative from 2007 to 2019.

== Personal life ==
Mosquini was born to Antonio Mosquini and Devanice Joana Mosquini. Before entering politics Mosquini was an electrical engineer. He is married to Angela Mosquini. He is a Baptist and attends the National Baptist Church in Jaru.

== Political career ==
Mosquini voted in favor of the impeachment of then-president Dilma Rousseff. He voted in favor of the 2017 Brazilian labor reform, and would vote against a corruption investigation into Rousseff's successor Michel Temer.

Prior to entering the chamber of deputies, Mosquini held several positions in his home state of Rondônia, namely being the president of the Agricultural Cooperative of Jaru and a vice-president of the Commercial and Industrial Association of the same municipality. Lúcio Mosquini was appointed by Governor Confúcio Moura in 2011 as director general of the Department of Roads and Transportation. In 2012 the Department of Roads and Transportation was merged with the Department of Training and Public Works, with Mosquini leaving that position.

In the run-up to the 2018 Brazilian general election Mosquini was issued a gag order by the TRE or Tribunal Regional Eleitoral de Rondônia (Regional Electoral Tribunal of Rondônia) after he was accused by Jair Bolsonaro's campaign of using images, logos, and videos that were copyrighted to the latter campaign.
