= Porto Alegre do Norte Airport =

Airport in Brazil

Porto Alegre do Norte Airport Aeroporto de Porto Alegre do Norte
- IATA: none; ICAO: SDH2; LID: MT0662

Summary
- Airport type: Public
- Operator: GRU Airport (2025–present)
- Serves: Porto Alegre do Norte
- Time zone: BRT−1 (UTC−04:00)
- Elevation AMSL: 217 m / 712 ft
- Coordinates: 10°55′05″S 051°36′32″W

Map
- Location in Brazil

Runways
| Direction | Length | | Surface |
| Direction | m | ft | Surface |
|---|---|---|---|
| 12/30 | 1,600 | 5,249 | Asphalt |
- Sources: ANAC, DECEA

Porto Alegre do Norte Airport (ICAO: SDH2) is the airport serving Porto Alegre do Norte, Brazil.

It is operated by GRU Airport.

== History ==
On November 27, 2025, GRU Airport won the concession to operate the airport.

== Airlines and destinations ==
No scheduled flights operate at this airport.

== Access ==
The airport is located 6 km (4 mi) from downtown Porto Alegre do Norte.

== See also ==
- List of airports in Brazil
