= Barra de Santo Antônio =

Municipality of Alagoas, Brazil

- Municipality
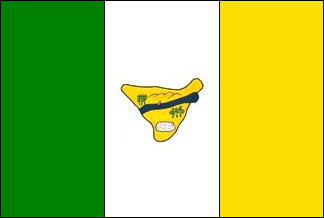
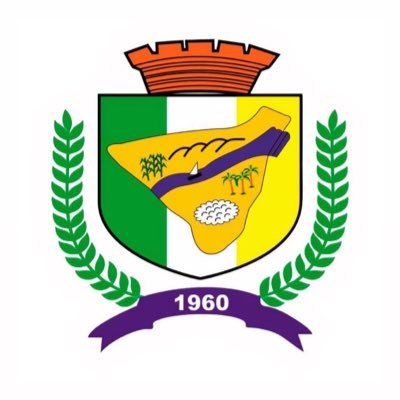
- Flag Coat of arms

- Location in Alagoas state

- Location in Brazil
- Coordinates: 9°24′18″S 35°30′25″W
- Country: Brazil
- Region: Northeast
- State: Alagoas
- Microregion: Maceió

Area
  - Total: 138.43 km^{2} (53.45 sq mi)

Population (2020)
  - Total: 16,068
  - Density: 116.07/km^{2} (300.63/sq mi)
- Time zone: UTC−3 (BRT)

Barra de Santo Antônio (Central northeastern portuguese pronunciation: [ˈbaɦɐ ˈdɪ sɐ̃tɐ̃ˈtõj(ʊ)]) is a municipality in the state of Alagoas in Brazil. The population is 16,068 (2020 est.) in an area of 138.43 km^{2} (53.45 sq mi). The elevation is 10 m. It is situated on the Atlantic coast, northeast of Maceió.
