= Irauçuba =

Municipality in Ceará, Brazil

Coordinates: 3°45′S 39°47′W

- Municipality
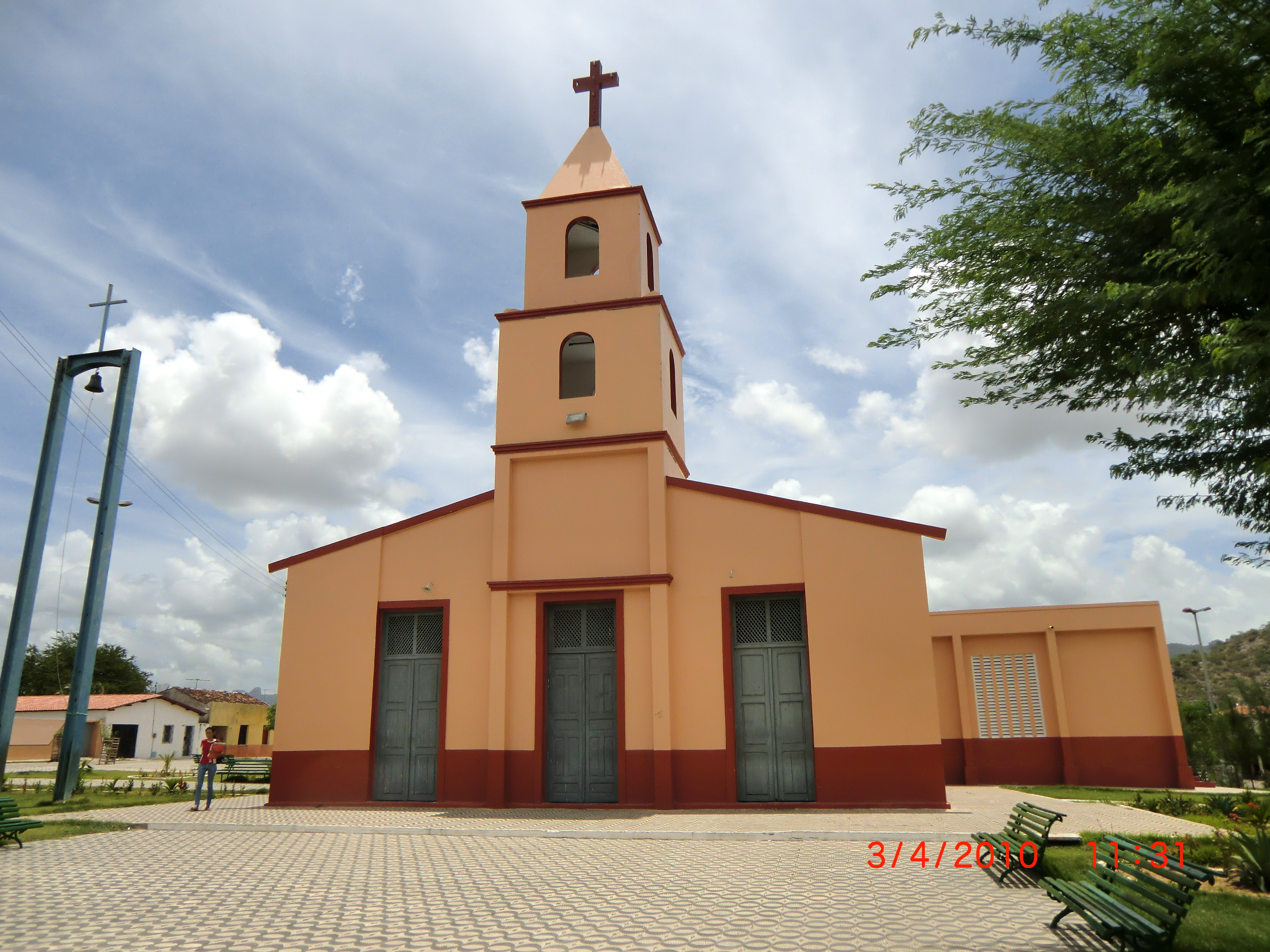

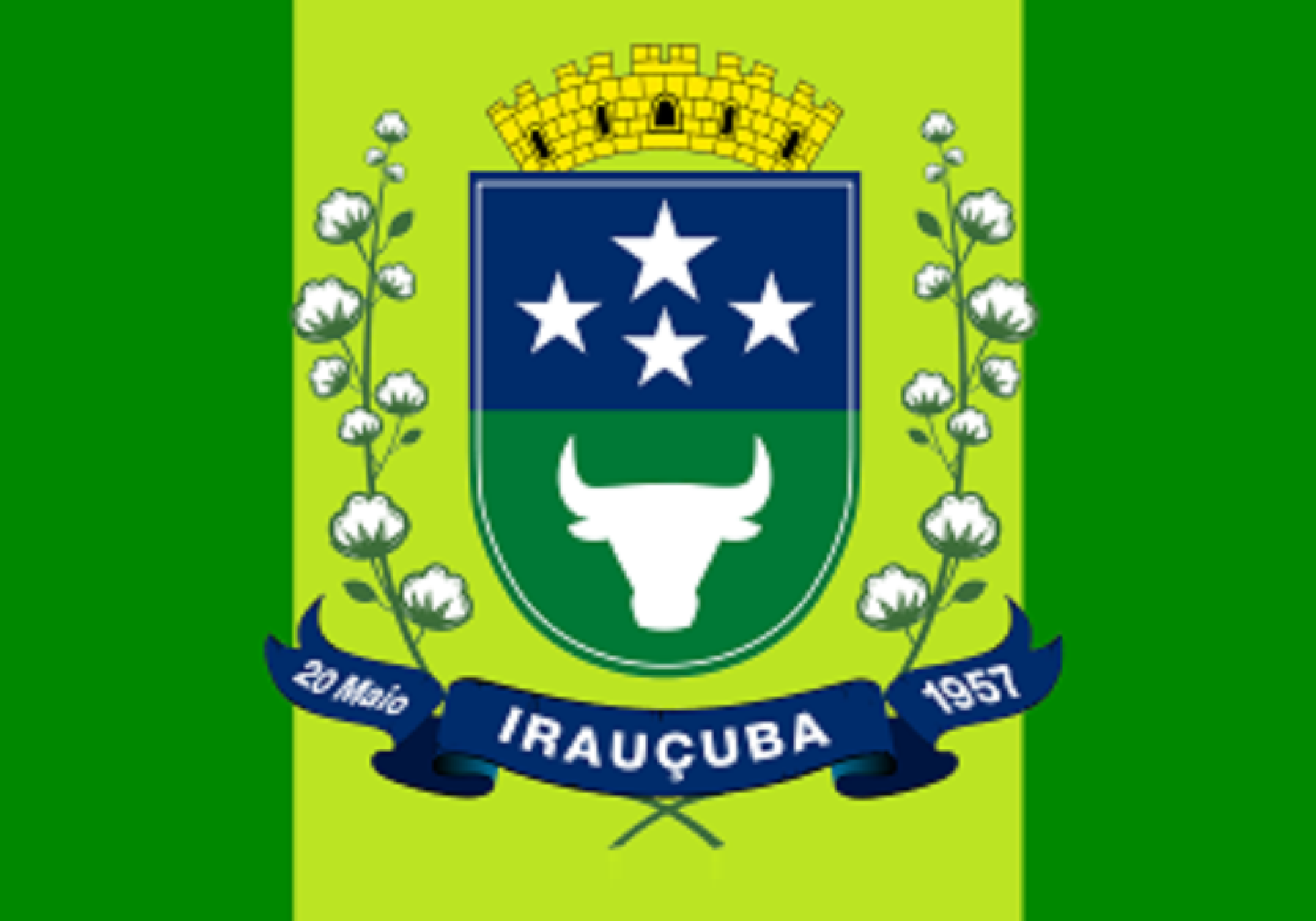
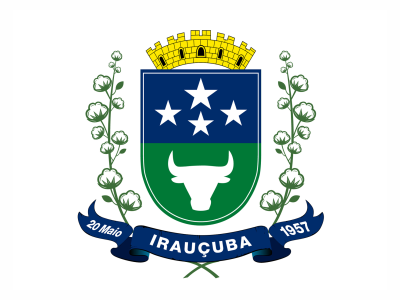
- Flag Coat of arms
- Nickname: "Land of Friendship"
- Interactive map of Irauçuba
- Country: Brazil
- Region: Nordeste
- State: Ceará
- Mesoregion: Noroeste Cearense

Area
  - Total: 558,390 sq mi (1,446,223 km^{2})

Population (2020)
  - Total: 24,305
- Time zone: UTC−3 (BRT)

Irauçuba is a municipality in the state of Ceará in the Northeast region of Brazil.

According to the resident population estimate made by the Brazilian Institute of Geography and Statistics IBGE in 2020, its population was 24,305 inhabitants.

== Geography ==
The climate is tropical. Summer has much less rainfall than the winter. The climate classification is according to Köppen and Geiger. The average temperature is 26.3 °C in Irauçuba. Average annual rainfall of 629 semi-arid hot mm. Tropical with average rainfall of 539 mm, with rainfall concentrated 12 January to April 13. Irauçuba has one of medium pluviometrias smaller state. The city is beating too desertification key Irauçuba already have been quite committed to desertification.

== See also ==
- List of municipalities in Ceará
