= Porto Alegre do Norte =

Coordinates: 10.8778°S 51.6328°W

- Municipality
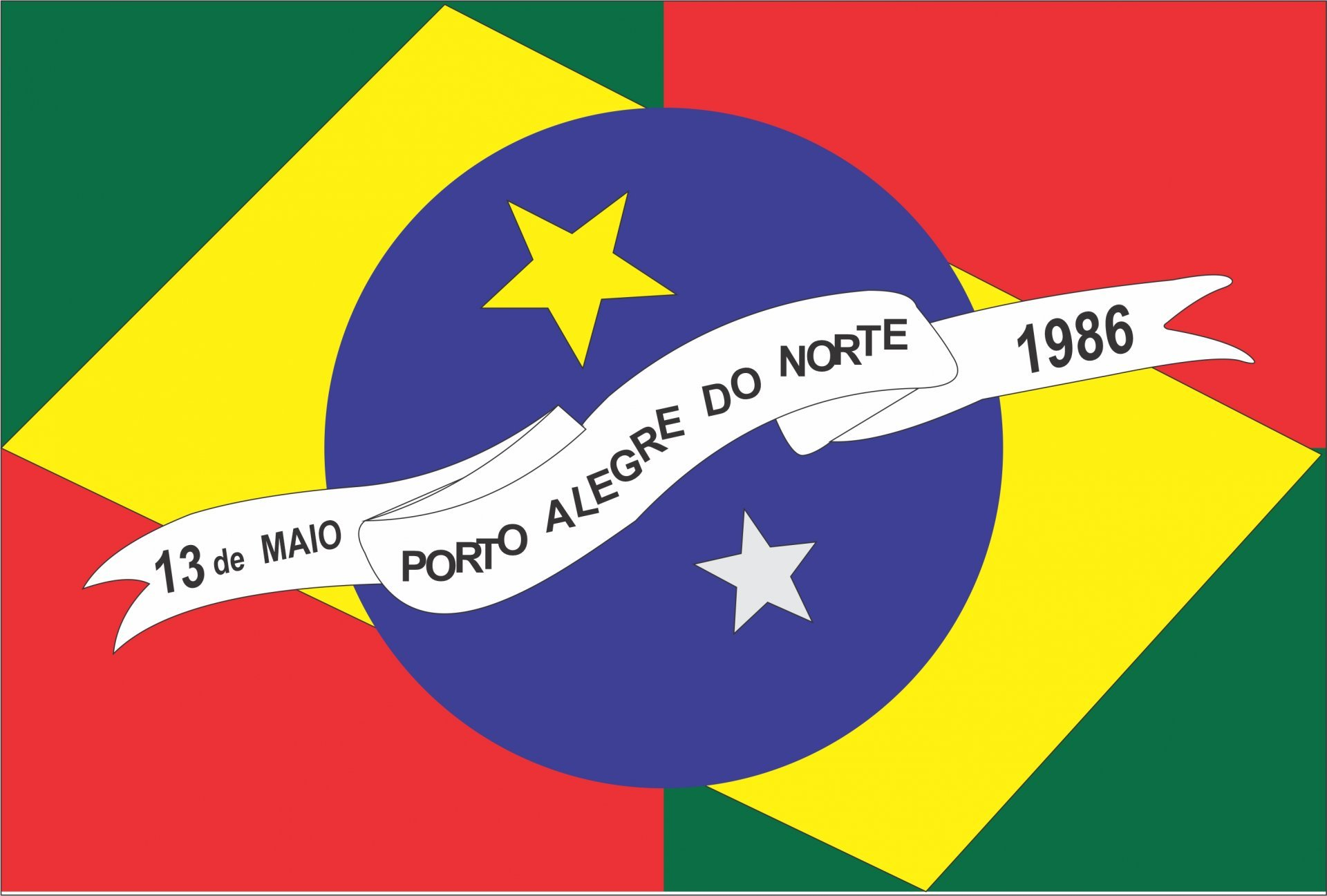
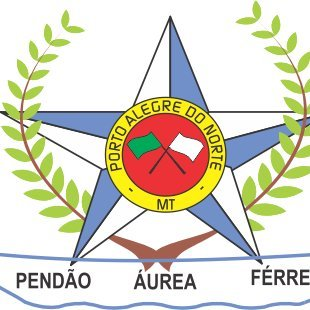
- Flag Coat of arms

- Country: Brazil
- Region: Center-West
- State: Mato Grosso
- Mesoregion: Nordeste Mato-Grossense

Population (2020)
  - Total: 12,685
- Time zone: UTC−3 (BRT)

Porto Alegre do Norte is a municipality in the state of Mato Grosso in the Central-West Region of Brazil.

== Transportation ==
The city is served by Porto Alegre do Norte Airport.

== See also ==
- List of municipalities in Mato Grosso
