= Arame, Maranhão =

Coordinates: 3°16′S 42°07′W

Arame (Maranhão)
- Municipality
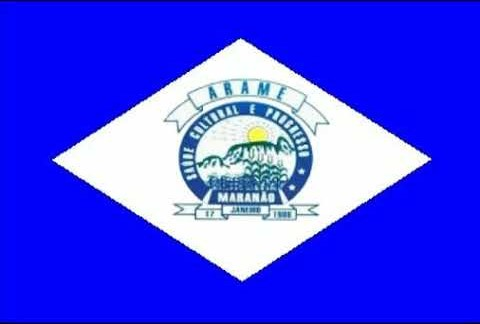
- Flag

- Location in Maranhão state
- Country: Brazil
- Region: Nordeste
- State: Maranhão
- Mesoregion: Centro Maranhense

Population (2020)
  - Total: 32,764
- Time zone: UTC−3 (BRT)

Arame is a municipality in the state of Maranhão in the Northeast region of Brazil.

== See also ==
- List of municipalities in Maranhão
