= Morro Agudo =

- Municipality
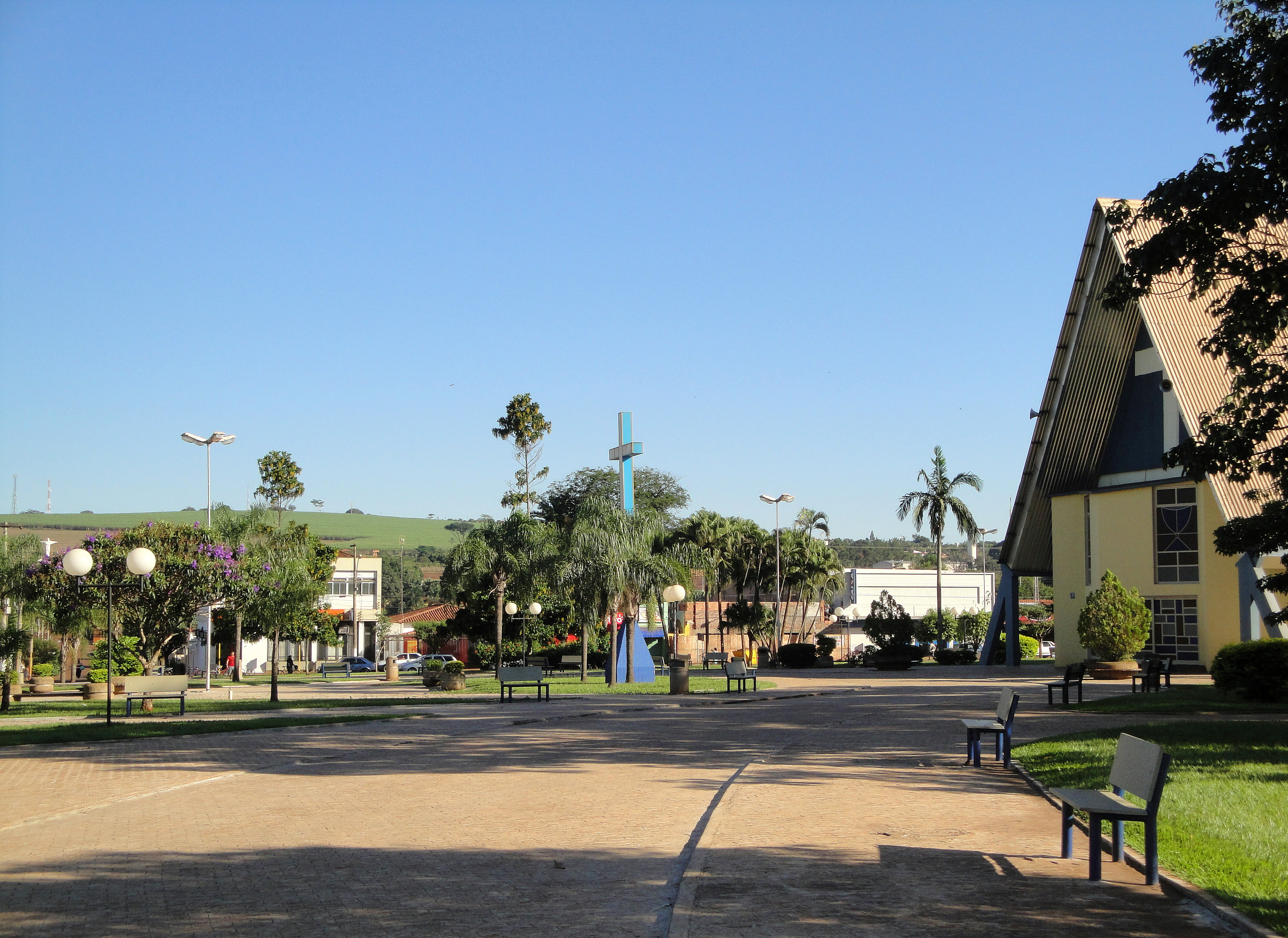

- Flag Coat of arms

- Location in São Paulo state

- Location in Brazil
- Coordinates: 20°43′53″S 48°3′28″W
- Country: Brazil
- Region: Southeast
- State: São Paulo
- Mesoregion: Ribeirão Preto ·
- Microregion: São Joaquim da Barra

Area
  - Total: 1,388 km^{2} (536 sq mi)

Population (2020)
  - Total: 33,288
  - Density: 23.98/km^{2} (62.11/sq mi)
- Time zone: UTC−3 (BRT)

Morro Agudo (Portuguese for "Sharp Hill") is a municipality in the state of São Paulo in Brazil. The population is 33,288 (2020 est.) in an area of 1,388 km^{2} (536 sq mi). The elevation is 546 m. The city is the biggest Brazilian sugar-cane producer.

== Religion ==
Christianity is present in the city as follows:

=== Catholic Church ===
The Catholic church in the municipality is part of the Roman Catholic Diocese of Barretos.

=== Protestant Church ===
The most diverse evangelical beliefs are present in the city, mainly Pentecostal, including the Assemblies of God in Brazil (the largest evangelical church in the country), Christian Congregation in Brazil, among others. These denominations are growing more and more throughout Brazil.

== Notable people ==
- Alemão, footballer

== See also ==
- List of municipalities in São Paulo
- Interior of São Paulo
