= Ribeirão Branco =

- Municipality
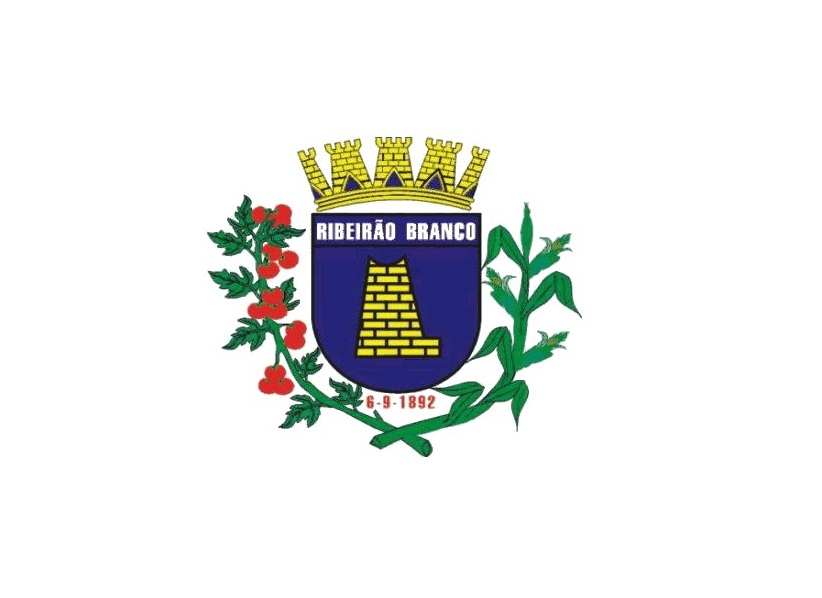
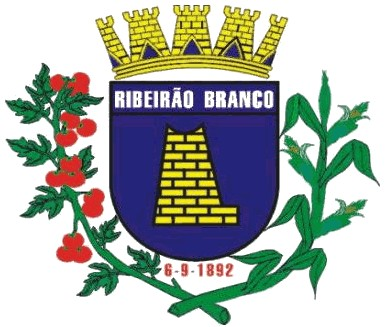
- Flag Coat of arms

- Location in São Paulo state

- Location in Brazil
- Coordinates: 24°13′15″S 48°45′56″W
- Country: Brazil
- Region: Southeast
- State: São Paulo

Government
  - Mayor: Mauro Teixeira (PTB)

Area
  - Total: 697.5 km^{2} (269.3 sq mi)

Population (2020)
  - Total: 16,211
  - Density: 23.24/km^{2} (60.20/sq mi)
- Time zone: UTC−3 (BRT)

Ribeirão Branco is a municipality in the state of São Paulo in Brazil. The population is 16,211 (2020 est.) in an area of 697.5 km^{2}. The elevation is 875 m.

== History ==
The municipality was created by state law in 1944.

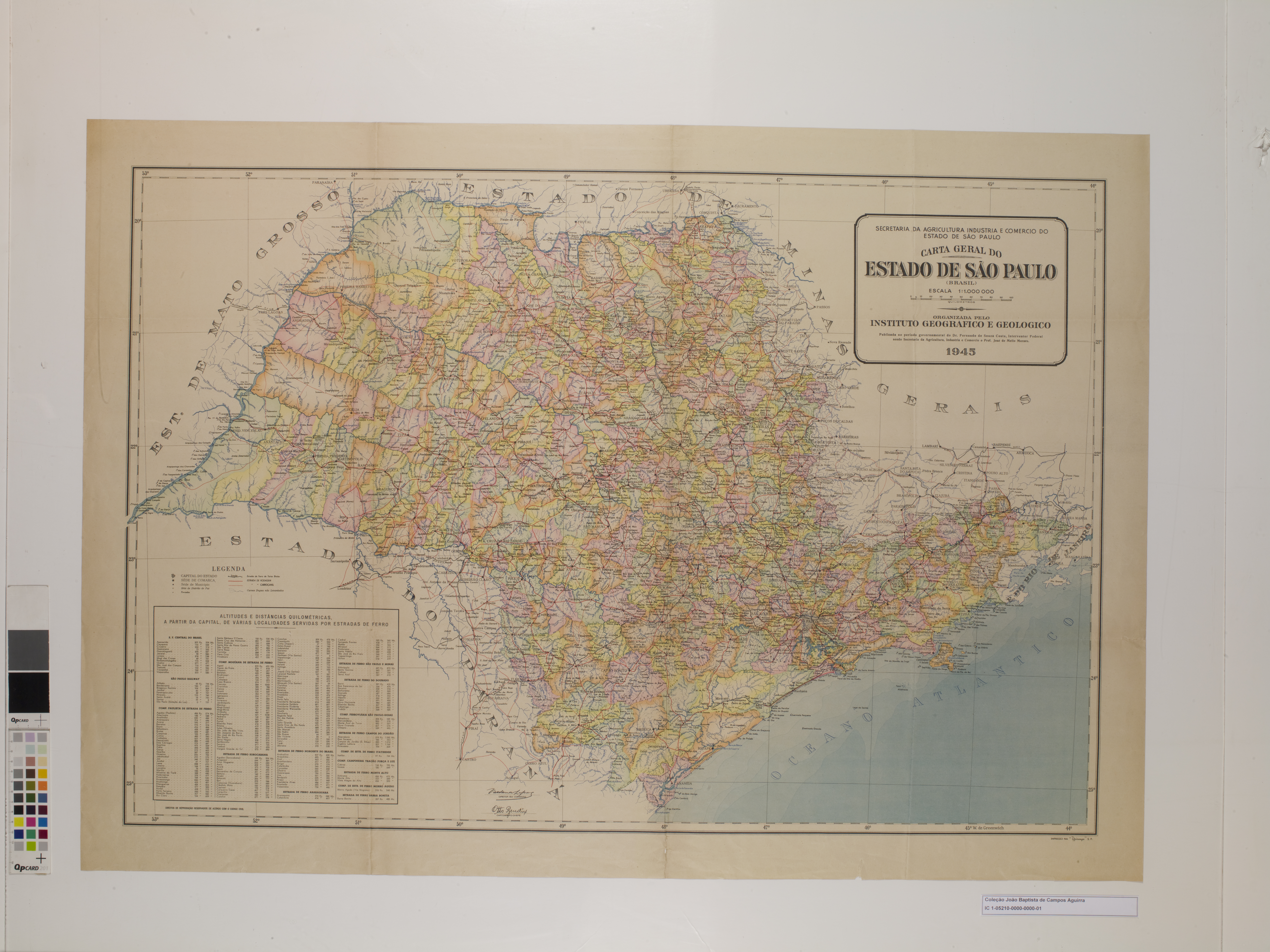
Map of the state of São Paulo (1944).

== Media ==
In telecommunications, the city was served by Companhia de Telecomunicações do Estado de São Paulo until 1975, when it began to be served by Telecomunicações de São Paulo. In July 1998, this company was acquired by Telefónica, which adopted the Vivo brand in 2012.

The company is currently an operator of cell phones, fixed lines, internet (fiber optics/4G) and television (satellite and cable).

== See also ==
- List of municipalities in São Paulo
