= Lunardelli =

Coordinates: 23°00′S 51°12′W

- Municipality
- Flag
- Interactive map of Lunardelli
- Country: Brazil
- Region: Southern
- State: Paraná
- Mesoregion: Norte Central Paranaense

Population (2020)
  - Total: 4,744
- Time zone: UTC−3 (BRT)

Lunardelli is a municipality in the state of Paraná in the Southern Region of Brazil.

Its origins date from 1948, when the big land owner Geremina Lunardelli, one of the so-called Coffee Kings, bought three farms in the region in order to produce coffee.

== See also ==
- List of municipalities in Paraná
