= Nova Bandeirantes =

- Municipality
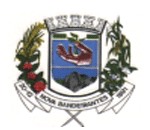
- Flag Coat of arms

- Location of Nova Bandeirantes in Mato Grosso

- Location of Nova Bandeirantes in Brazil
- Coordinates: 9.81389°S 57.8619°W
- Country: Brazil
- Region: Center-West
- State: Mato Grosso
- Mesoregion: Norte Mato-Grossense

Population (2020)
  - Total: 15,685
- Time zone: UTC−4 (BRT)

Nova Bandeirantes is a municipality in the state of Mato Grosso in the Central-West Region of Brazil.

The municipality contains part of the 19,582 square kilometres (7,561 sq mi) Juruena National Park, one of the largest conservation units in Brazil.

== See also ==
- List of municipalities in Mato Grosso
