= Santa Rita do Trivelato =

Coordinates: 13.8119°S 55.2669°W

- Municipality
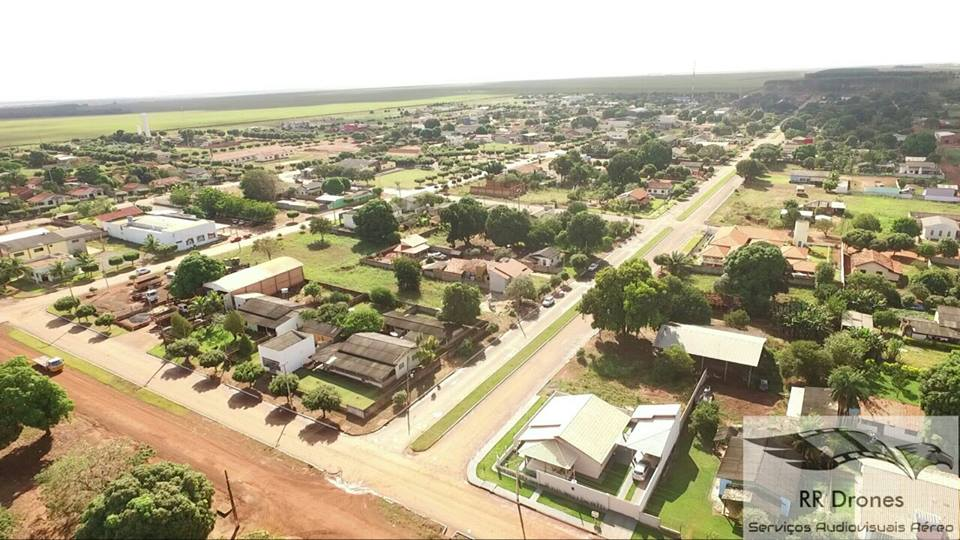
- The Municipali of Santa Rita do Trivelato

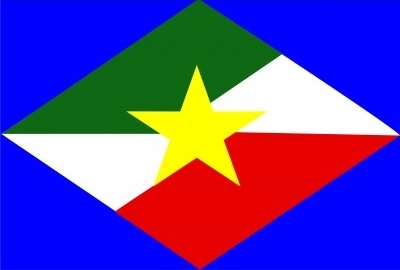
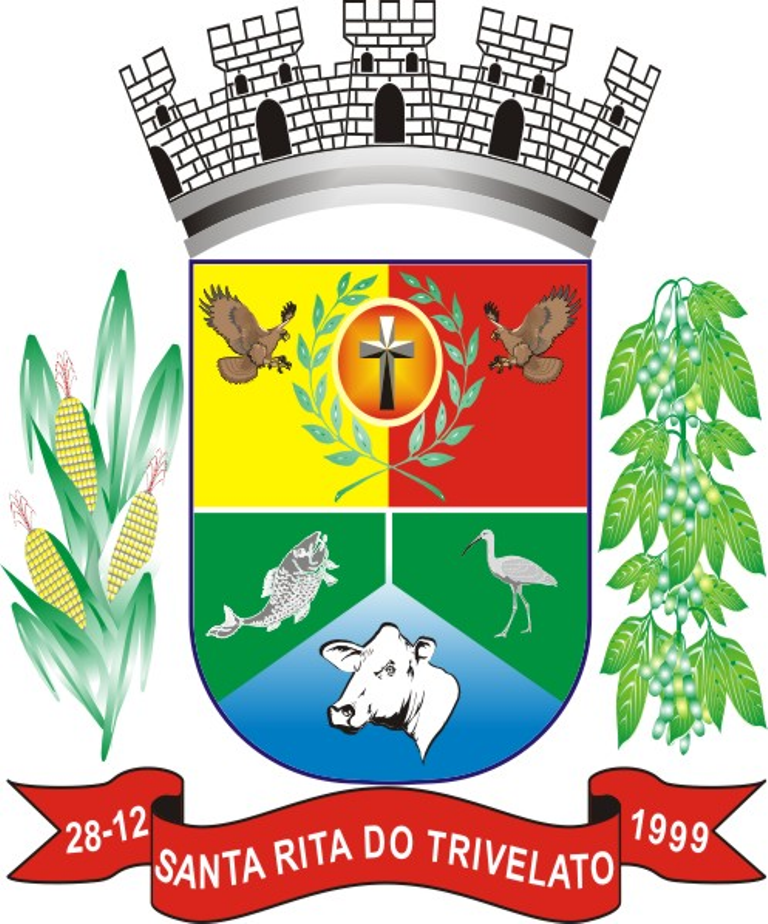
- Flag Coat of arms

- Country: Brazil
- Region: Center-West
- State: Mato Grosso
- Mesoregion: Norte Mato-Grossense

Population (2020)
  - Total: 3,506
- Time zone: UTC−3 (BRT)

Santa Rita do Trivelato is a municipality in the state of Mato Grosso in the Central-West Region of Brazil.

== See also ==
- List of municipalities in Mato Grosso
