= Sertaneja, Paraná =

Sertaneja
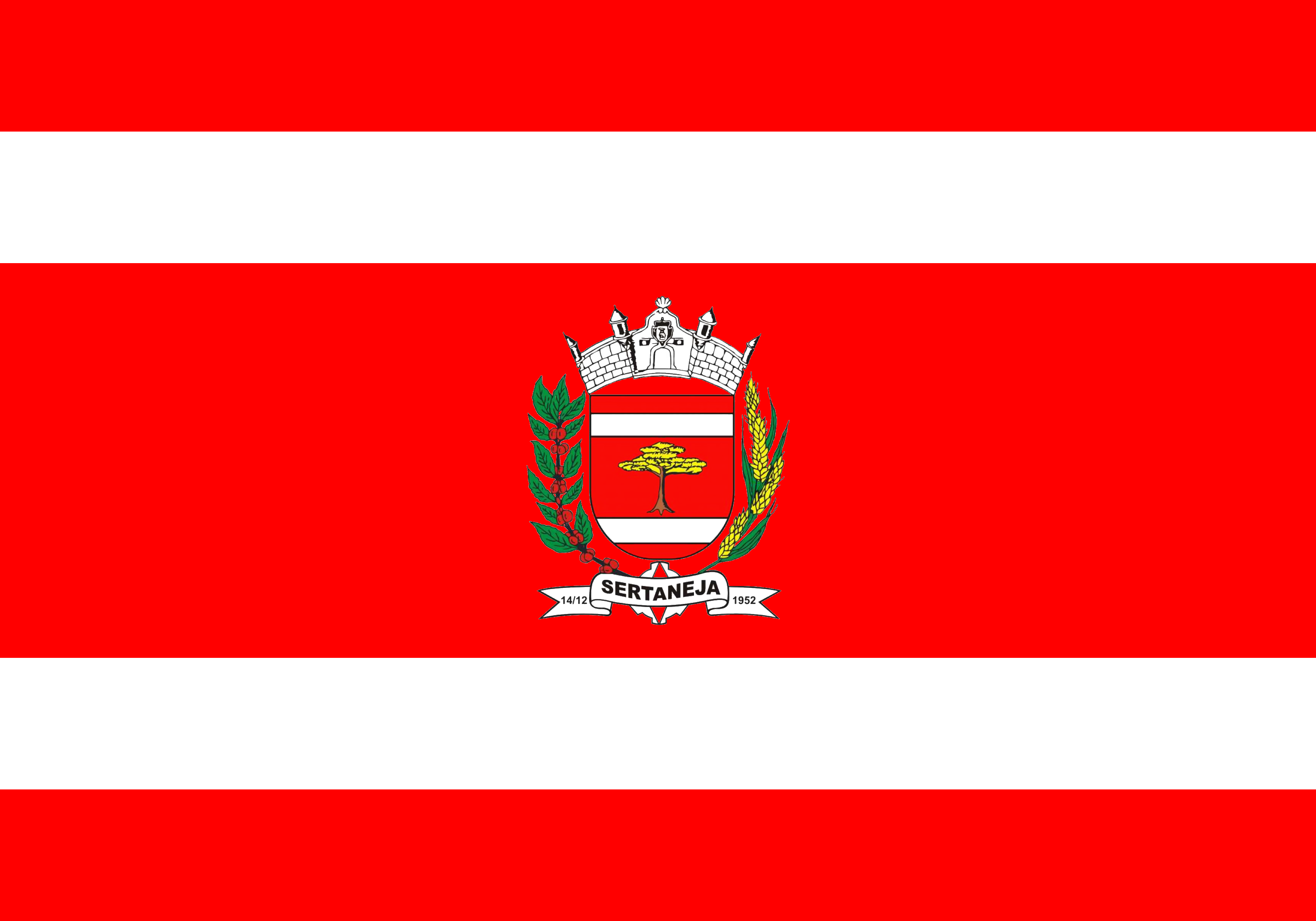
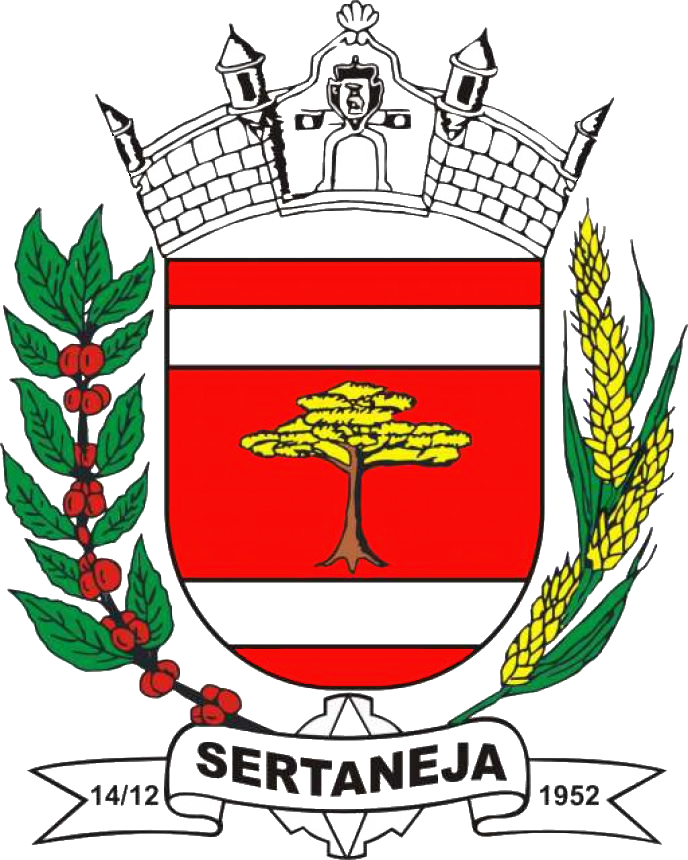
- Flag Coat of arms

- Location in Brazil

- Location within Brazil
- Coordinates: 23°02′13″S 50°50′16″W
- Country: Brazil
- State: Paraná

Area
  - Total: 444.48 km^{2} (171.61 sq mi)
- Elevation: 520 m (1,710 ft)

Population (2020)
  - Total: 5,216
- Time zone: UTC−3 (BRT)
- Website: sertaneja.pr.gov.br

Sertaneja is a municipality in the state of Paraná in Brazil.

It was established as a municipality according to Law nº 2/1947, dated 10 October 1947 dividing the earlier Cornélio Procópio municipality into 3 new district municipalities: Sertaneja, Leópolis and Congonhas.

The municipal area of Sertaneja is 444,48 km² and its population 5,216 (2020). Agriculture is the town's main industry.
