= Sonora, Mato Grosso do Sul =

Sonora
- Municipality
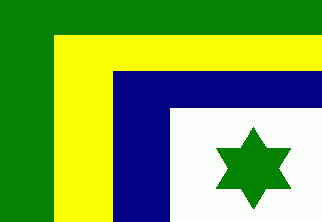
- Flag

- Location in Mato Grosso do Sul state

- Location in Brazil
- Coordinates: 17°34′37″S 54°45′28″W
- Country: Brazil
- Region: Central-West
- State: Mato Grosso do Sul

Area
  - Total: 4,075 km^{2} (1,573 sq mi)
- Elevation: 442 m (1,450 ft)

Population (2020)
  - Total: 19,721
  - Density: 4.840/km^{2} (12.53/sq mi)
- Time zone: UTC−4 (AMT)

Sonora is a municipality located in the Brazilian state of Mato Grosso do Sul. Its population was 19,721 (2020) and its area is 4,075 km^{2} (1,573 sq mi).
