= Comodoro =

Coordinates: 13°39′S 59°47′W

The municipality of Comodoro
- Municipality
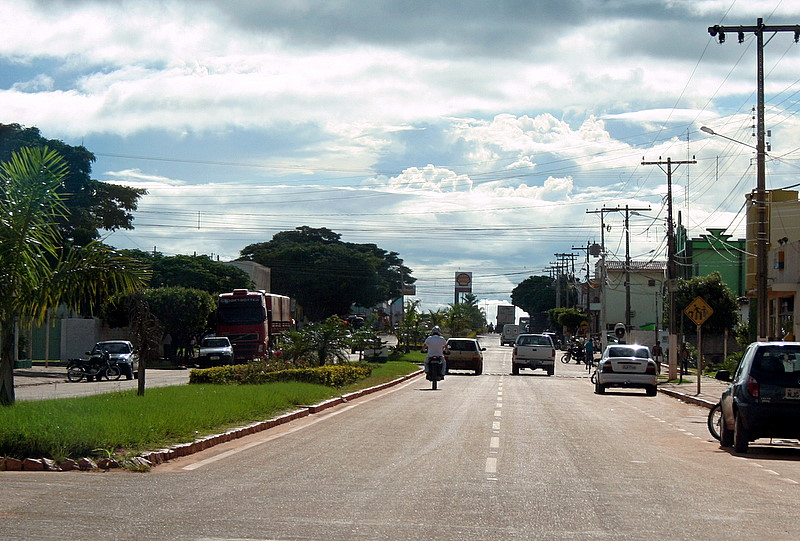

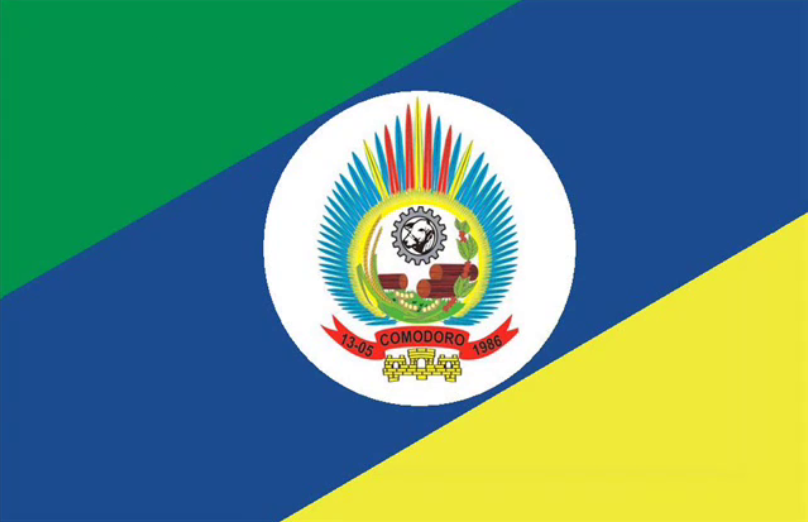
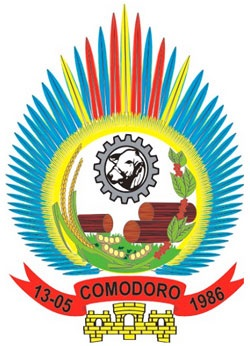
- Flag Coat of arms
- Nickname: "New West"
- Location of Comodoro
- Country: Brazil
- Region: Center-West
- State: Mato Grosso
- Mesoregion: Norte Mato-Grossense
- Founded: 1986

Area
  - Total: 8,407.07 sq mi (21,774.22 km^{2})
- Elevation: 2,000 ft (600 m)

Population (2020)
  - Total: 21,008
  - Density: 2.1/sq mi (0.82/km^{2})
- Demonym: Comodorense
- Time zone: UTC−3 (BRT)
- Postal Code (CEP): 78310-000
- Area code: +55 65
- Website: Comodoro, Mato Grosso

Comodoro is a municipality in the state of Mato Grosso in the Central-West Region of Brazil.

== See also ==
- List of municipalities in Mato Grosso
