= Sapezal =

Coordinates: 13.5425°S 58.8142°W

- Municipality
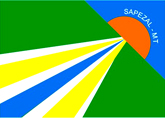
- Flag

- Country: Brazil
- Region: Center-West
- State: Mato Grosso
- Mesoregion: Norte Mato-Grossense

Population (2020)
  - Total: 26,688
- Time zone: UTC−3 (BRT)

Sapezal is a municipality in the state of Mato Grosso, which is in the Central-West Region of Brazil.

== See also ==
- List of municipalities in Mato Grosso
