= Jaru, Rondônia =

Municipality in Rondônia, Brazil

Jaru
- Municipality
- The Municipality of Jaru
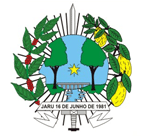
- Flag Coat of arms

- Location of Jaru in the State of Rondônia

- Localization of Jaru in Brazil
- Coordinates: 10°26′20″S 62°27′59″W
- Country: Brazil
- Region: North
- State: Rondônia
- Demonym: jaruense
- Founded: November 7, 1981

Government
  - Mayor: João Gonçalves Junior (PSDB)

Area
  - Total: 2,944.025 km^{2} (1,136.694 sq mi)

Population (2020)
  - Total: 51,620
  - Density: 17.623/km^{2} (45.64/sq mi)
- Time zone: UTC−4 (AMT)

Jaru is a municipality in the Brazilian state of Rondônia. It is located at latitude 10 ° 26'20 "South and longitude 62 ° 27'59" West, with an altitude of 124 meters. Its population is estimated at 51,620 inhabitants (IBGE/2020).

It has an area of 2944 km ². The city of Jaru is situated in the valley of the river Jaru.

== History ==
The council came around a telegraph of the posts installed in 1912 by the Commission of Strategic Telegraph Line Mato Grosso / Amazon, led by then-Col. Candido Mariano da Silva Rondon. However, the River Valley Jaru was occupied by the rubber tappers and since the nineteenth century, despite the resistance imposed by the nation of Jarus, who had under his rule, occupying a vast area stretching from the river Jaru, left tributary of Ji-Parana river, to the shores of the upper course of the Madeira River.

In 1915, the Rondon Commission undertook studies exploring the Rio Jaru, keeping its name in homage to the original inhabitants, the Jarus. The current occupation of the valley Jaru occurred since 1975, with the installation of the Integrated Project of Colonization Father Adolpho Rohl, INCRA, settlements of colonists to come mainly from the Central South of Brazil

Their demographic and economic development resulted in the elevation of the project area to the category of municipality, with the location of Jaru as municipal seat elevated to city status. Created by Law No. 6921 of June 16, 1981, the city was named Jaru, named after the river and the Indian nation of Jarus.

== Physical aspects ==
The Relief: The surface of the municipality of Jaru presents a generally corrugated relief not existing merchant landforms. Vegetation: Is the dominance of Amazon Forest. Climate: Equatorial humid.

== See also ==
- List of municipalities in Rondônia
