= Gleice Jane =

Gleice Jane Barbosa

State deputy of Mato Grosso do Sul
- Incumbent
- Assumed office April 11, 2023
- Preceded by: Amarildo Cruz

Personal details
- Born: Gleice Jane Barbosa; December 10, 1979 (age 46) Campo Grande, Mato Grosso do Sul, Brazil
- Party: Workers' Party
- Education: Mato Grosso do Sul State University
- Occupation: Politician, Professor, Social Activist

Gleice Jane Barbosa (born December 10, 1979), commonly known as Gleice Jane, is a Brazilian teacher, politician, and social activist. She is a member of the Workers' Party (PT) and currently serves as a state deputy in the Legislative Assembly of Mato Grosso do Sul (ALEMS).

== Early life ==
Gleice Jane Barbosa was born and raised in Mato Grosso do Sul, Brazil. She graduated with a degree in Letters from the State University of Mato Grosso do Sul (UEMS). Her academic work focused on the social function of universities, a topic inspired by her active role as a student leader and president of the Central Directory of Students at UEMS. She further specialized in Inclusive Education at the Federal University of Grande Dourados (UFGD).

== Career ==
Gleice is teacher of English in the state education network of Mato Grosso do Sul for over 16 years. Her teaching methodology emphasizes dialogue with students on social, environmental, and linguistic diversity issues.

In addition to her teaching career, Gleice Jane has been an active union leader. She served two terms as president and vice-president of the Teachers' Union of Dourados (Simted-Dourados). She is also an executive director of the Central Única dos Trabalhadores de Mato Grosso do Sul (CUTMS).

== Political career ==
Gleice Jane's political career began with her involvement in social movements and advocacy for women's rights, social justice, urban rights, and environmental protection. In the 2022 elections, she was elected as the first alternate for the Workers' Party. She assumed office in 2023 following the passing of Deputy Amarildo Cruz.

== Personal life ==
Jane is known for her commitment to feminist causes and her active participation in social movements. She continues to advocate for the rights of women, social justice, and environmental protection.
