= Mato Grosso do Sul State University =

Public university in Brazil

- Universidade Estadual de Mato Grosso do Sul
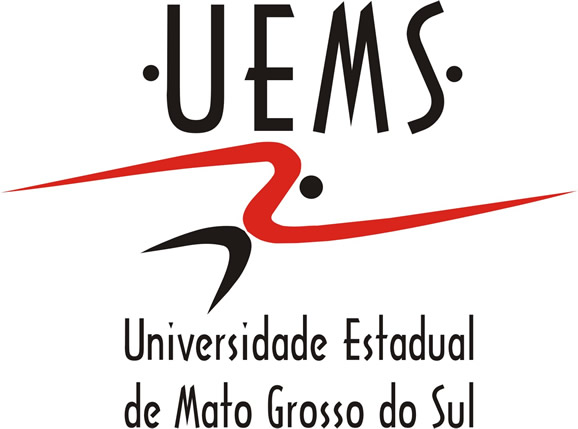
- Other name: UEMS
- Type: Public
- Established: December 22, 1993
- Rector: Laércio Alves de Carvalho
- Location: Mato Grosso do Sul, Brazil
- Campus: 15 municipalities; Dourados; Amambai; Aquidauana; Campo Grande; Cassilândia; Coxim; Glória de Dourados; Ivinhema; Jardim; Maracaju; Mundo Novo; Naviraí; Nova Andradina; Paranaíba; Ponta Porã
- Language: Portuguese
- Website: http://www.uems.br/

The Mato Grosso do Sul State University (Portuguese: Universidade Estadual de Mato Grosso do Sul, UEMS) is a public university in the state of Mato Grosso do Sul, Brazil. It has 15 campuses all over the state, and its rectory is located in the city of Dourados.

== See also ==
- Federal University of Mato Grosso do Sul (UFMS)
- Federal University of Grande Dourados (UFGD)
- List of state universities in Brazil
