= March to the West =

20th-century Brazilian policy to develop borderlands

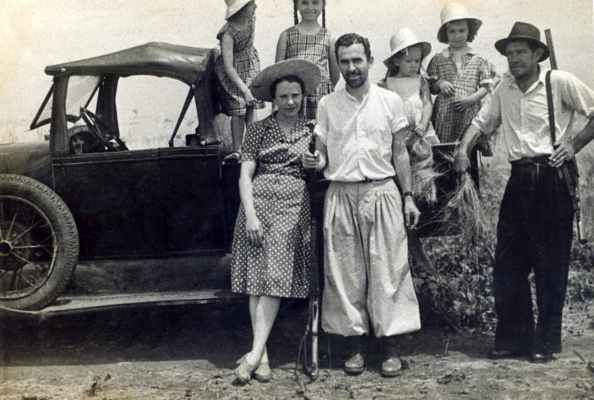
The agronomist Jorge Aguirre, the first administrator of the National Agricultural Colony of Dourados (Cand), appointed by Getúlio Vargas on 24 November 1943, and his wife and children

The March to the West (Portuguese: Marcha para o Oeste) was a public policy engendered by the government of Getúlio Vargas during the Estado Novo (1937–1945) in order to develop and integrate the Center-West and North regions of Brazil, which until that moment had a low population density, quite different from what occurred in the Brazilian coastal region. At the beginning of the 1940s, practically all of the country's 43 million inhabitants were concentrated along the coast and saw the interior of their own country as something exotic. The region was nothing more than a huge and unexplored spot in Brazilian geography.

Apart from that, this policy also aimed at the creation of a feeling of nationality and belonging in these areas in the entire Brazilian population. The notion of territorial "void" updated the concept of "sertão", understood as an abandoned space that since Euclides da Cunha's denunciations had been worrying Brazilian elites interested in building a nation.

== The march ==
For such an undertaking, the government needed to know well the territory to be integrated, thus, a series of entities were created in order to produce information for the development of government actions, such as the National Council of Geography, the National Council of Cartography, the National Statistics Council and the Brazilian Institute of Geography and Statistics (IBGE), the latter in 1938. These agencies would help the State to formulate and implement its policies aimed at overcoming the territorial "voids" and the little interaction of the urban network.

The form of integration between regions and cities that the federal government opted for at that time was land transport, therefore, the creation in 1937 of the National Department of Highways (DNER) undoubtedly indicates the importance of roads as an instrument of communication between regions and cities.

This is how, in 1940, Vargas launched the so-called "march to the West", as a guideline for territorial integration for the country. And he did so during the inauguration festivities of the city of Goiânia.

The march, in addition to gaining the support of the population, had the help of businessmen from São Paulo who made donations to the various expeditions to recognize the soil, convinced by the nationalist discourse of remembering the bandeirantes of past centuries. The memory of the bandeirantes served as an inspiration for several participants of the march to the sertão. Even in various advertisements of the time, the resumption of the colonization myth can be noted. It was as if Brazil was being recolonized by Vargas.

Intellectual collaboration with Getúlio Vargas' program included a publication by the São Paulo poet Cassiano Ricardo entitled Marcha Para Oeste: a influência da bandeira na formação social e política do Brasil, published in 1940. It was a mythical version of the National State, in which Cassiano makes an analogy between the organization of the bandeiras in the 16th century and that of the Estado Novo.

The concrete political action of the Estado Novo was felt with the creation of "federal territories" in 1943: Amapá, Rio Branco (present-day Roraima), Guaporé (present-day Rondônia), Iguaçu and Ponta Porã, these would later be granted the status of states of the federation or incorporated into already existing states. The federal government also acted in the colonization region of northern Paraná, which gave rise to a series of new cities such as Londrina, Maringá, Cianorte, Umuarama.

The Roncador-Xingu Expedition also stands out within the "march to the West", which was planned to conquer and clear the heart of Brazil. Initiated in 1943, the movement entered Central Brazil, unveiled the south of the Amazon and made contact with several indigenous ethnicities still unknown. In the lead, three brothers who marked this period of national history: Leonardo, Cláudio and Orlando Villas-Bôas.

The main lines of "territorial policy" - settlement policies, regulating population displacement, transport and communication - of the Vargas government would later be taken up by president Juscelino Kubitschek. The construction of Brasília can be understood as a new "March to the West", as it displaced populations (the so-called "candangos", mainly northeastern migrants) to the sertão and made it possible for the equipment of urban life to reach the region. More than that, it took the central power to the interior and served to start a process of displacement of Brazilian modernization from the Center-South to the Center-West.

== See also ==
- Lebensraum
- Manifest Destiny, a slogan in the United States regarding westward expansion in the 19th century
