= Federal University of Mato Grosso do Sul =

Public university in Brazil

- Universidade Federal de Mato Grosso do Sul
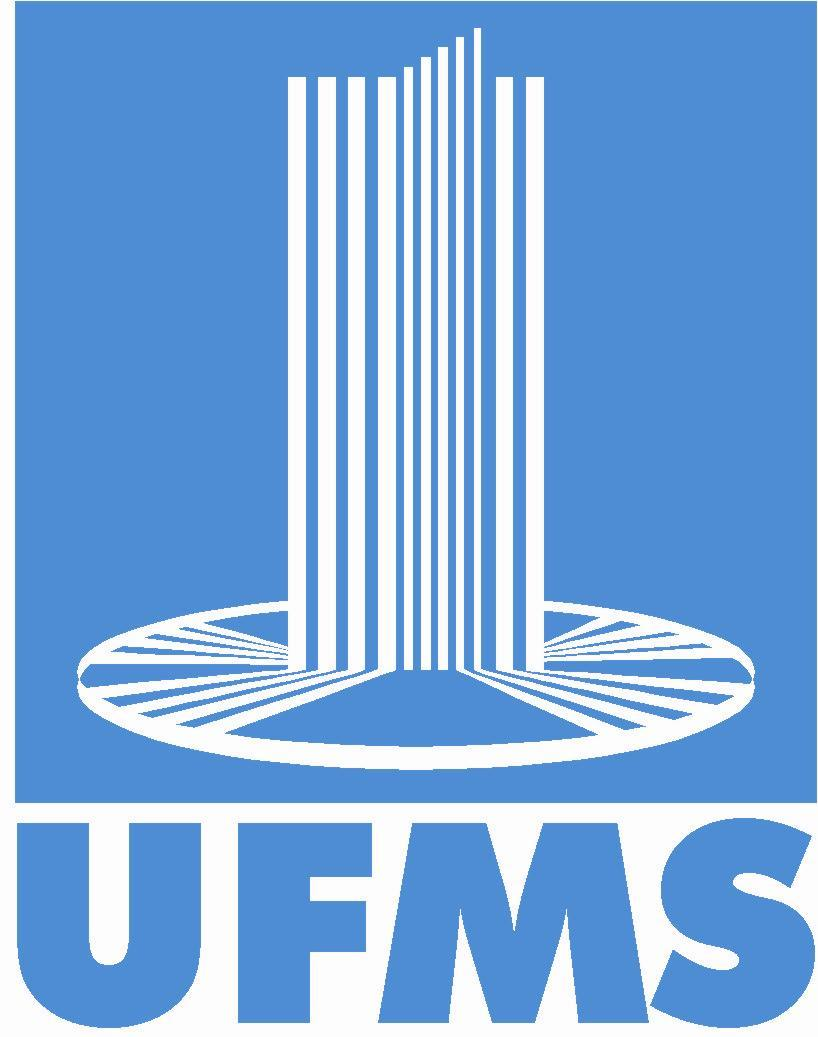
- Other name: UFMS
- Type: Public, (Federal)
- Established: 5 Jul 1979
- Budget: R$ 819 million
- Rector: Marcelo Augusto Santos Turine
- Academic staff: 1,300
- Administrative staff: 1,050
- Students: 20,100
- Undergraduates: 17,800
- Postgraduates: 2,300
- Location: Campo Grande (main campus), Mato Grosso do Sul, Brazil
- Campus: Urban, rural
- Colours: Cornflower blue, White
- Mascots: Capi, the capybara
- Website: www.ufms.br

The Federal University of Mato Grosso do Sul (Portuguese: Universidade Federal de Mato Grosso do Sul, UFMS), is a public university located in the state of Mato Grosso do Sul in Brazil. It has, in addition to the main campus in Campo Grande (the State's capital), nine campuses located in the following inland cities: Aquidauana, Chapadão do Sul, Corumbá, Coxim, Naviraí, Nova Andradina, Paranaíba, Ponta Porã and Três Lagoas.

== History ==
The Federal University of Mato Grosso do Sul's history begins in 1962, with the establishment of the University of Pharmacy and Odontology, being located in Campo Grande, which then belonged to the state of Mato Grosso.

Furthermore, during the 1960s, the Brazilian dictatorship had plans to fund federal universities in each state capital. However, the southern population of Mato Grosso would not have access to them, which helped to increase the strength of the separatist movement and made the former state governor, Pedro Pedrossian, start to plan the creation of the State University of Mato Grosso, in Campo Grande.

Meanwhile, in 1966, the University of Pharmacy and Odontology became Campo Grande's Biological Sciences Institute, which added a Medicine course to its curriculum. In 1967, the state of Mato Grosso's administration established the Human Sciences and Modern Languages Institute in Três Lagoas and the Superior Institute of Pedagogy, in Corumbá.

In 1969, the State University of Mato Grosso was finally created. This new institution incorporated all of the above, and extended its reach, in 1970, to the towns of Aquidauana and Dourados, with the creation of two Centers of Pedagogy. The State University of Mato Grosso's creation was officialized on the 4th of November, 1970.

In 1977, the state of Mato Grosso was divided in two by the former president Ernesto Geisel. Therefore, the State University of Mato Grosso was now mainly located in cities that belonged to Mato Grosso do Sul. To solve this problem, the federal government established the Federal University of Mato Grosso do Sul, with its main campus being in Campo Grande, the new state's capital.

Thus, the Federal University of Mato Grosso do Sul, as it is today, was officially created in 1979, by the law number 6.674, enacted by former president João Figueiredo.

== Campuses ==
The university has nine campuses, located in the cities of Campo Grande, Aquidauana, Corumbá, Coxim, Naviraí, Nova Andradina, Paranaíba, Ponta Porã and Três Lagoas.

The campus located at the city of Campo Grande, capital of the state of Mato Grosso do Sul, is the main administrative headquarters of the University. It also counts with its own University Hospital and two sports stadiums.

The campus located at the city of Dourados was separated from the Federal University of Mato Grosso do Sul in 2006, giving birth to its own University: the Federal University of Grande Dourados, by the Law number 11.153

In 2015, a campus in the city of Bonito was opened, however being closed a few years later, in 2019. Even so, the building of the campus kept acting as a Advanced Research Unit.

== Graduation Courses ==
=== Campo Grande campus ===
- Biological Sciences
  - Biology
  - Nursing
  - Pharmacy
  - Physiotherapy
- Exact Sciences
  - Architecture
  - Environmental Engineering
  - Civil Engineering
  - Electrical Engineering
  - Physics
  - Mathematics
  - Chemistry
- Human Sciences
  - Management
  - Visual Arts
  - Economics
  - Social Sciences
  - Social Communication
  - Physical Education
  - Philosophy
  - History
  - Linguistics
  - Music
  - Pedagogy
  - Psychology
- School of Computing
  - Computer Science
  - Computer Engineering
  - Software Engineering
  - Systems Analysis
  - Systems Development and Analysis
  - Computer Networks
- Law School
  - Law
- Medical School
  - Medicine
- Veterinary School
  - Veterinary Medicine
- Dentistry School
  - Dentistry

=== Aquidauana campus ===
- Biological Sciences
  - Biology
- Exact Sciences
  - Mathematics
- Human Sciences
  - Management
  - Geography
  - History
  - Linguistics
  - Pedagogy
  - Tourism

== Maria Aparecida Pedrossian University Hospital ==
The Maria Aparecida Pedrossian University Hospital was opened in 1971 as a way to support the Medical School of the former State University of Mato Grosso, but needed to be closed right afterwards due to lack of resources, being reopened only in 1975.

The hospital has multiple facilities, including its own surgery center, intensive therapy center for adults and children, neonatal intensive care unit, obstetrics center, human milk bank, among others. Also, hemodialisys and radiology services are also performed at the facility.

Procedures are completely free of charge, as the hospital is a part of the Brazilian unified public healthcare system. Currently, it counts with medical residency in 20 specialties, being reference in high risk motherhood, attending bearers of HIV and treating contagious diseases.

== Criticism ==
The university has been criticized for owning Morenão, a soccer stadium used by professional teams. Critics say that the purchase of the stadium was a wrong use of governmental funds. However, part of Morenão is used for academic research.

== Notable alumni ==
- Luiz Henrique Mandetta, former Health Minister of Brazil
- Wellington Fagundes, senator for the state of Mato Grosso
- Luiz Ovando, congressman for the state of Mato Grosso do Sul
- Neiva Guedes, president of the Instituto Arara-Azul

== See also ==
- List of federal universities of Brazil
