= Neiva Maria Robaldo Guedes =

Brazilian biologist and scientist

Neiva Maria Robaldo Guedes, or Neiva Guedes (born 10 December 1962 in Ponta Porã) is a Brazilian biologist and a specialist on environment and species conservation.

In November 1989, Neiva came across a flock of hyacinth macaws in the Pantanal and, knowing that they were in danger of extinction, she began to work on cataloguing and conserving the species with her own means. Illegal capture for the pet bird trade, habitat destruction and feather collection for handicrafts were the main reasons for the drastic reduction in hyacinth macaw numbers.

== Biography ==
Neiva was born in 1962, in Ponta Porã, in the Brazilian state of Mato Grosso do Sul. Initially, Neiva wanted to study medicine and become a pediatrician, but she did not pass the entrance examination. Then she began taking part in the biology course which took place at night, allowing her to work during the day to help her family.

She graduated in biology from the Universidade Federal do Mato Grosso do Sul in 1987. In 1990, she entered the master's degree program at Escola Superior de Agricultura Luiz de Queiroz, studying the reproductive biology of the hyacinth macaw of the Pantanal.

Still a recent graduate, in 1989 Neiva first saw the hyacinth macaw in the Pantanal. Upon discovering that they were in danger of extinction she reasoned that the best way to preserve the species would be to study the causes of their disappearance, monitoring the remaining individuals, mapping nests, counting eggs and chicks. At the time, there was little research on hyacinth macaws, and Neiva's research work was the main generator of information on hyacinth macaw populations, their ways of life and reproduction.

While studying for her master's, she travelled to the Pantanal from the municipality of Miranda, replicating her studies. With help from the World Wide Fund for Nature, she learned to climb trees to access the nests of the hyacinth macaws. Neiva discovered that hyacinth macaws are "environmental engineers" of nature: Their nests, which are built in cavities in trees, are also used by other species, and the macaws help spread seeds to more distant locations from the mother plant.

Towards the end of the 1980s it was estimated that the population of hyacinth macaws numbered less than 1500 individuals. By 2019, circa 6500 individual hyacinth macaws lived in the Pantanal alone, not counting additional individuals elsewhere in the cerrado biome. Neiva's work also revealed that the main obstacle to the species' reproduction was the lack of nesting cavities for the animals and their young, causing birds to quarrel for the few good spaces available. Thus, Neiva and her co-workers started installing wooden nesting boxes on top of the trees. Farmers allowed the researchers to enter and install nesting boxes and even started planting trees to facilitate the hyacinth macaws' reproduction.

In 2005, Neiva began her doctorate at the Universidade Estadual Paulista, where she successfully defended her thesis in 2009 on continuation of her work with the hyacinth macaws. Today, Neiva is one of the most eminent specialists on hyacinth macaws in Latin America. She is a professor at the Universidade para o Desenvolvimento do Estado e da Região do Pantanal and has been president of the Instituto Arara Azul for 30 years.

== Instituto Arara Azul ==
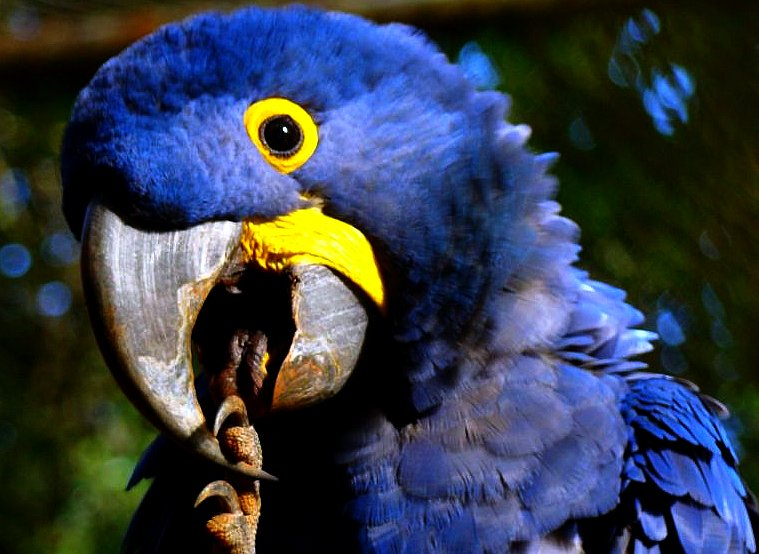
Hyacinth macaw of the Pantanal

The Hyacinth Macaw Institute (Portuguese: Instituto Arara Azul) was created in 2003 in the Pantanal. It is responsible for promoting conservation of hyacinth macaws, biodiversity in the Pantanal through engaging people and raising awareness in the populace about rational use of natural resources. It is a non-profit civilian organization with administrative and financial autonomy thanks to partnerships with private and public entities.

Beyond studying hyacinth macaws, the institute also studies the reproductive biology of red-and-green macaws, toucans, hawks, owls, muscovy ducks, and other species that coexist with hyacinth macaws in the Pantanal. In total, the institute surveys an area of more than 400 thousand hectares, monitoring circa 615 nests, spread across 57 farms, and 5000 birds throughout the Pantanal. The institute is globally recognized as a top authority on parrot research, and has educated professionals in Brazil and beyond.

In 2019, Neiva was nominated for the Prêmio Faz Diferença (English: Make a Difference Award), a partnership between the Brazilian newspaper O Globo and the Industry Federation of the State of Rio de Janeiro.
