= BYO =

BYO or byo may stand for:

- BYO Records
- IATA code Bonito Airport
- BYOB, a reference to "bring your own" alcohol
- Byo river in the Central African Republic
