= Morenão =

Stadium in Campo Grande, Brazil

Coordinates: 20°30′05″S 54°36′35″W

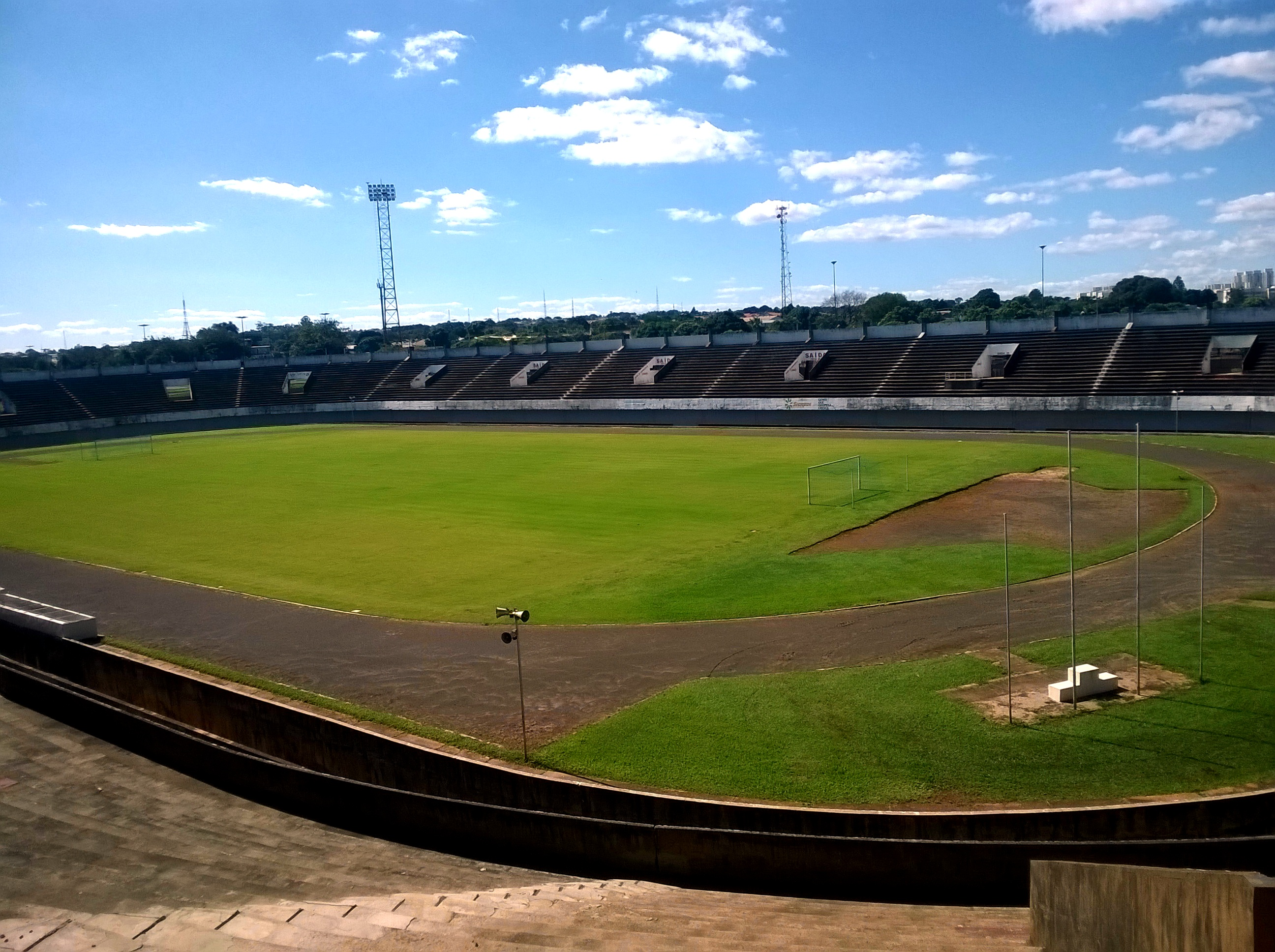
- Sisbrace
- Interactive map of Morenão
- Full name: Estádio Universitário Pedro Pedrossian
- Location: Campo Grande, Brazil
- Owner: Federal University of Mato Grosso do Sul
- Capacity: 45,000
- Surface: Grass
- Field size: 110m x 70m

Construction
- Opened: March 7, 1971

Tenants
- Comercial; Operário

Morenão, also known as Estádio Universitário Pedro Pedrossian, is the home ground of Operário and Esporte Clube Comercial. It is located at Cidade Universitária ("University City", in English), in Campo Grande, Mato Grosso do Sul, Brazil.

== Information and history ==
The stadium is owned by Universidade Federal do Mato Grosso do Sul ("Mato Grosso do Sul Federal University", in English), also known as UFMS.

Morenão was inaugurated on March 7, 1971. The first stadium match was Flamengo against Corinthians, won by the former by 3–1. The first goal of the stadium was scored by Buião, of Flamengo.

The stadium was named after the veteran Brazilian-Armenian politician Pedro Pedrossian.

The stadium has a capacity of 45,000 people.

== Trivia ==
- The stadium is nicknamed Morenão in reference to Campo Grande city, which is known as Cidade Morena ("Brown City", in English) because of the reddish color of its soil.
- The biggest stadium attendance was 38,122 people, set on February 23, 1978, when Operário beat Palmeiras 2–0.

== Brazil national football team ==
Date	Time (UTC–4)	Team #1	Res.	Team #2	Round	Attendance
14 October 2009	18:00	Brazil	0–0	Venezuela	2010 FIFA World Cup qualification	23,746
