= Nova Casa Verde =

- District
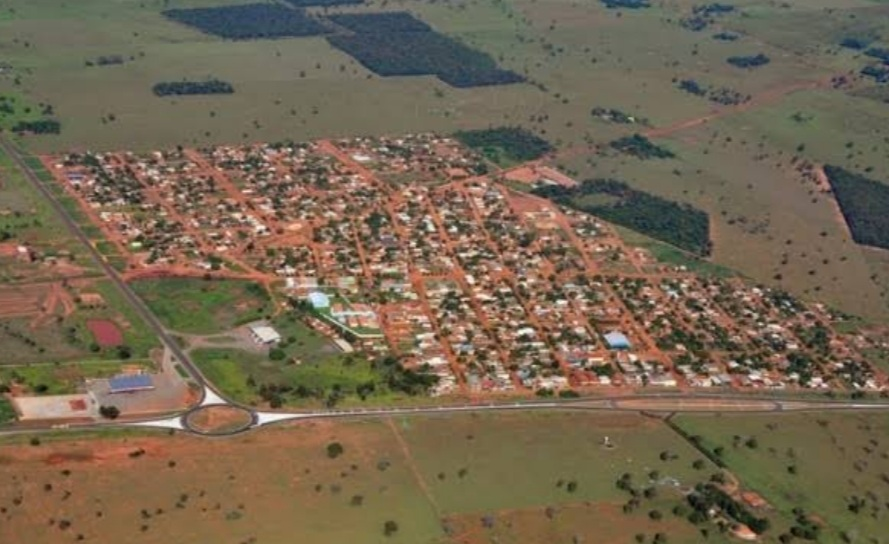
- Aerial photo of Nova Casa Verde

- Location in Brazil
- Coordinates: 21°45′31″S 53°16′02″W
- Country: Brazil
- Region: Central-West
- State: Mato Grosso do Sul

Population (2010)
  - Total: 3,524
- Time zone: UTC-04:00 (BRT-1)
  - Summer (DST): UTC-03:00 (BRST-1)

Nova Casa Verde is a district in the municipality of Nova Andradina, located in the Brazilian state of Mato Grosso do Sul. Its population was 3,524 in 2010. The district of Nova Casa Verde was created on October 31, 2000.

== Transport ==
- BR-267 passes through and links the district to the east with Bataguassu and further on to São Paulo State, and to the west is Nova Alvorada do Sul and the further interior of Mato Grosso do Sul.
- MS-134 provides a link southwards to Nova Andradina and other areas of Mato Grosso do Sul's southeastern area.
