= Federal territories of Brazil =

Overview of Brazilian federal territories

The Federal territories of Brazil (Portuguese: Territórios federais do Brasil) are sub-national administrative divisions overseen by the federal government of Brazil. Unlike the federative units of Brazil, federal territories are directly administered by the federal government. The 1988 Constitution of Brazil was the final constitution to regulate the establishment and disestablishment of federal territories. Federal territories can be created from federative units after a successful plebiscite involving the residents who would belong to the new territory. They can either be dissolved by elevation to new states or reintegration into the federative units that they were dismembered from.

If a new territory is created, it can have municipalities and will elect four federal deputies. Unlike federal units, the territories have no senators because they are directly managed by the federal government. If a federal territory has more than 100 thousand residents, it will have a governor elected directly by the president and central judiciary, first and second level courts, and representative members of the Public Prosecutor's Office and Public Defender's Office.

Brazil does not currently have any federal territories. The 1988 Constitution abolished all three territories then existing: Fernando de Noronha became a state district of the state of Pernambuco, and the Federal Territory of Amapá and the Federal Territory of Roraima were elevated to statehood.

== Legislation ==
=== Initial Constitutions ===
The 1934 Constitution was the first constitution to include any mention of federal territories. This constitution ratified legislation regarding the legal framework for the creation of federal territories included in the Constitutional Reform of 1926.

The 1937 Constitution provided more legislation regarding federal territories. Notably, that they can only be created in the interest of national security, they must be created by being dismembered from existing states, and that their administration would be regulated by special laws.

=== 1988 Constitution ===
The modern laws governing the creation, organization, and administration of Federal Territories were established by the 1988 Constitution. According to Article 18 of the 1988 Constitution, the creation, conversion into a state, or reintegration of Federal Territories into their original states would be regulated by complementary legislation enacted by the National Congress following a plebiscite involving the local community. (Note: 1988 Brazil Const. ttl III, ch. I, art. 18) The specific legal framework for federal territories are set by Article 33. (Note: 1988 Brazil Const. ttl III, ch. V, sect. II, art. 33) This allows the territories to be divided into municipalities (Note: 1988 Brazil Const. ttl III, ch. V, sect. II, art. 33, § 1) and mandates their financial accounts be submitted to the national congress. (Note: 1988 Brazil Const. ttl III, ch. V, sect. II, art. 33, § 2) It additionally says that federal territories with "over 100 thousand inhabitants shall have an appointed governor, courts of first and second instance, and members of the Public Prosecutor's Office and Public Defender's Office". (Note: 1988 Brazil Const. ttl III, ch. V, sect. II, art. 33, § 3) Section 2 of Article 45 gives federal territories the ability to elect four representatives to the Chamber of Deputies. (Note: 1988 Brazil Const. ttl IV, ch. I, sect. I, art. 45, § 2)

The Transitional Constitutional Provisions Act (ADCT), a separate document with constitutional rules to ensure a peaceful transition between constitutions, appended to the 1988 Constitution included two articles for the dissolution of the then 3 existing federal territories. Articles 14 and Article 15 of the ADCT reincorporated the Federal Territory of Fernando de Noronha into the state of Pernambuco (Note: Transitional Constitutional Provisions Act, Art. 14) and converted Roraima and Amapá into states, (Note: Transitional Constitutional Provisions Act, Art. 15) respectively. Additionally, Article 12 of the ADCT set guidelines for the creation of the Commission for Territorial Studies whose purpose was to "present studies on the national territory and preliminary projects for new territorial units, especially in the Legal Amazon". The commission was given one year to submit their findings to the National Congress. (Note: Transitional Constitutional Provisions Act, Art. 13)

== History ==
=== First Federal Territory ===
The first territory administered directly by the central government was the Federal Territory of Acre and was created by Decree No. 1,181, of February 25, 1904, during the presidency of Rodrigues Alves (1902–1906). The land that would become the Brazilian territory was acquired from Bolivia after the Treaty of Petropolis due to conflicts between the Bolivian Army and Brazilians from the northeast who migrated into Bolivian land in search of rubber trees in the Amazon. The Brazilian Constitution of 1891 did not account for the existence of federal territories which lead to discussion and debate around the necessity for the creation of type of political-administrative unit in Brazil. Lawmakers who advocated for the existence of federal territories looked to how the United States handled and implemented their territories. The creation of the Territory of Acre followed a similar trajectory to that of the territories of the United States during their westwards expansion as it was a purchased border region with the potential for economic development.

From 1903 to 1920, the Territory of Acre was organized into the three departments of the Upper Acre (Alto Acre), the Upper Purus (Alto Purus), and the Upper Juruá (Alto Juruá). These three departments were all administered autonomously from one another by mayors appointed directly by the president of the republic. On October 1, 1920, Decree No. 14,383 unified the departments into the Territory of Acre, with the capital being the city of Rio Branco, according to the second article of that legislation. It was administered as a territory until 15 June 1962 when it was elevated to the state of Acre during the presidency of João Goulart (1961-1964) by Law No. 4,070.

=== Vargas Era establishments ===
The first constitutionally-recognized federal territories arose as a result of the March to the West policy introduced by the nationalist Vargas Era government (1930-1945). This policy sought to further populate the sparsely populated border regions of Northern, Central, and Southern Brazil and to instill national fervor in the Brazilian populace in hopes of developing underutilized land, strengthening national cohesion, and protecting its national borders. This policy alongside Brazil's entrance to WW2 in 1942 led to the eventual creation of six federal territories. The Federal Territory of Fernando de Noronha was dismembered from the state of Pernambuco by Decree-Law No. 4,102 on February 9, 1942 and served as a support point for the American military during the Second World War. On September 13, 1943, Decree-Law No. 5,812 dismembered five more federal territories from various states across Brazil: Amapá, Guaporé, Iguaçu, Ponta Porã, and Rio Branco.
