= Iguaçu =

Iguaçu, Iguazú or Yguazú may refer to:

== Inhabited places ==
- Puerto Iguazú, Argentina
- Foz do Iguaçu, Paraná, Brazil
- Nova Iguaçu, Rio de Janeiro, Brazil
- Nova Iguaçu de Goiás, Goiás, Brazil
- Iguaçu Territory, a former Brazilian federal territory
- Iguaçu state, a proposed Brazilian state
- Yguazú District, a municipality in Paraguay, formerly known as Colonia Yguazú

== Rivers ==
- Iguaçu River (Rio de Janeiro), a river in the state of Rio de Janeiro, Brazil
- Iguazu River, river in Brazil and Argentina
  - Iguazu Falls, on the Iguazu River
- Yguazú River, Paraguay

== Other uses ==
- Iguaçu, a 1977 album by Passport
- 1684 Iguassú, a main belt asteroid
- Iguaçu National Park (Brazil)
- Iguazú National Park (Argentina)
