= Bonito, Mato Grosso do Sul =

Município de Bonito
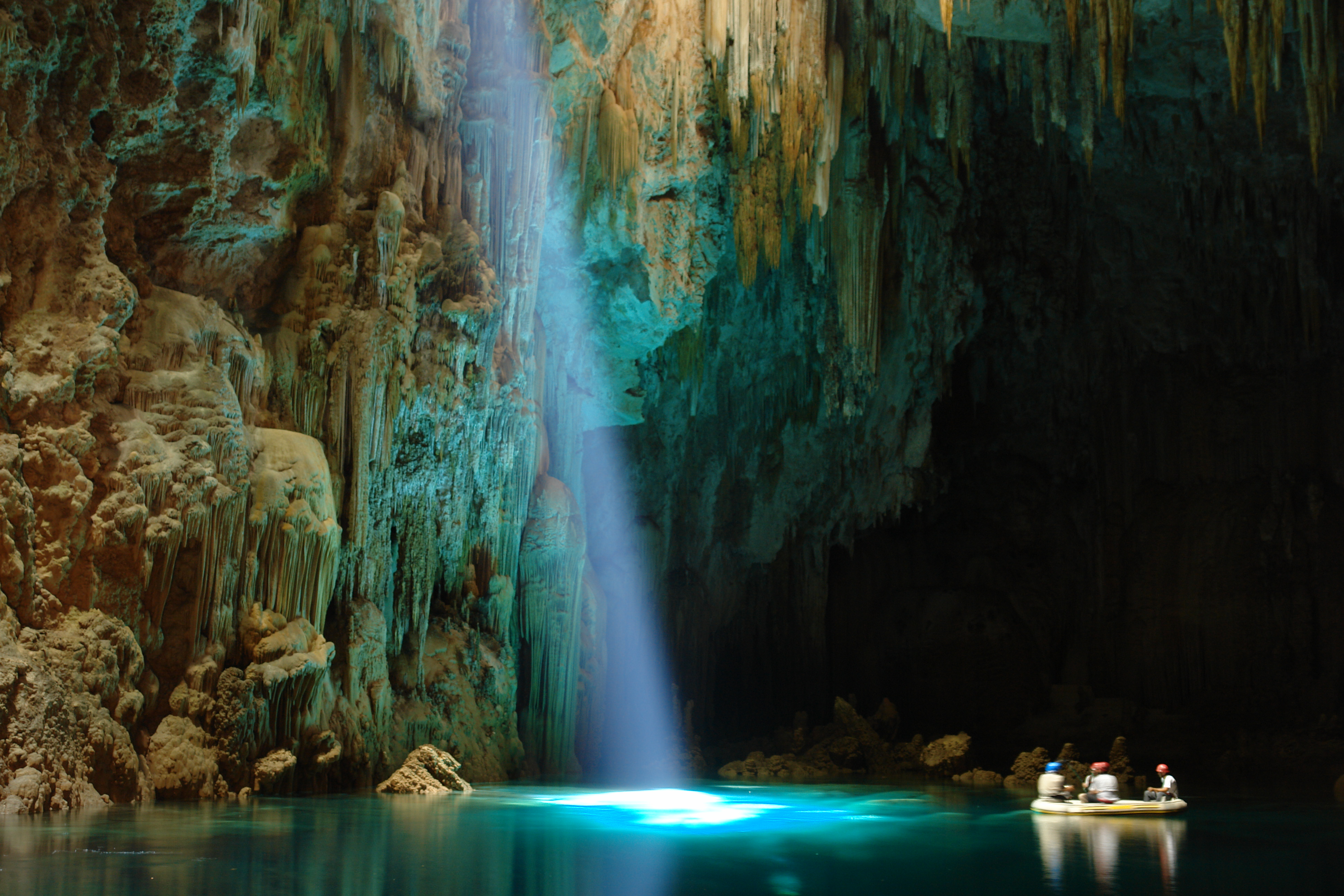
- Abismo Anhumas (Anhumas Abyss)

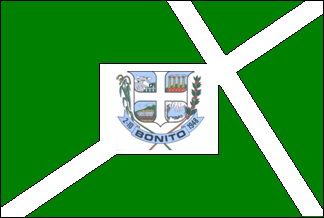
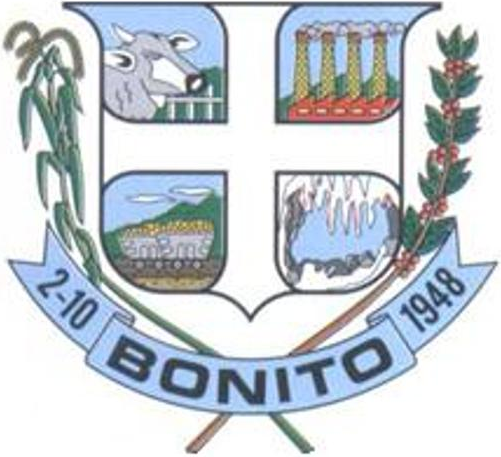
- Flag Coat of arms
- Nickname: Capital do ecoturismo
- Location in Brazil
- Coordinates: 21°08′S 56°29′W
- Country: Brazil
- Region: Center-West
- State: Mato Grosso do Sul
- Founded: 1948

Government
  - Mayor: José Artur Soares de Figueiredo PMDB

Area
  - Total: 4,934 km^{2} (1,905 sq mi)
- Elevation: 315 m (1,033 ft)

Population (2020)
  - Total: 22,190
  - Density: 3.6/km^{2} (9.3/sq mi)
- Time zone: UTC−4 (AMT)
- HDI (2000): 0.767 – high
- Website: www.bonito.ms.gov.br

Bonito is a municipality located in the Brazilian state of Mato Grosso do Sul. As of 2020 its population was 22,190, and it has an area of 4,934 square kilometres (1,905 sq mi).

== History ==
The area that would become the center of the Municipality of Bonito started with the land of the Rincão Bonito Fazenda, which had an area of 10.5 square miles (27 km^{2}) and was acquired by Euzébio Captain Luiz da Costa Leite Falcão in 1869. He is considered the pioneer of Bonito, and was also its first registrar and public notary.

State Law No. 693 of June 11, 1915, initially established the District of Paz de Bonito, with an area taken from the Municipality of Miranda and made administratively subordinate. With the creation of the Federal Territory of Ponta Porã, by Decree-Law No. 5839 on September 21, 1943, it was annexed to the District of Paz de Miranda.

Under the Constitutional Act of the Transitional Provisions of the Federal Constitution, it was restored to the state of Mato Grosso, together with the district belonging to the Municipality of Miranda. Finally, State Law No. 145 of October 2, 1948, made it a municipality, with its seat in the town of Bonito.

== Economy ==
=== Tourism ===
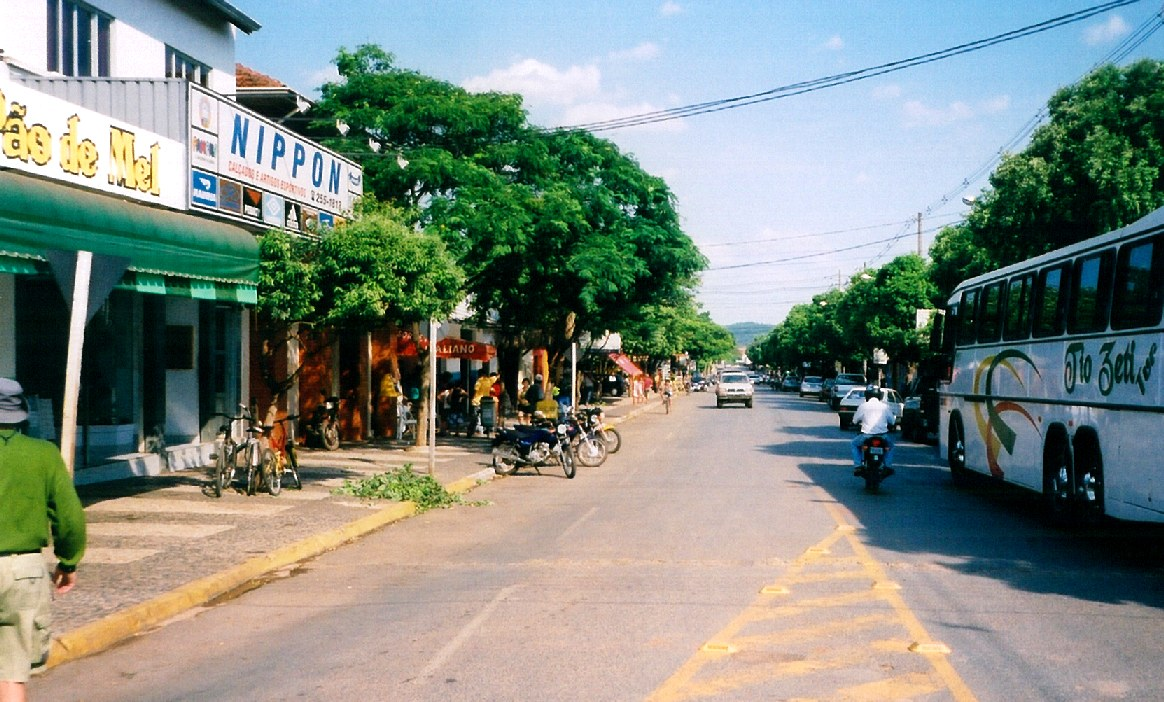
Bonito's main street (2002)

There are more than 30 tours available in and around the Bonito area. The majority of the tours are based around exploring the ecology and natural environment of the area. Almost all of the tours need to be booked through an official tourist agency in the town and require an accredited guide, although this will be organised at the time of booking. Some of these most popular tours include:

- Abismo Anhumas (Anhumas Abyss) – Rappelling 72 metres (236 ft) down into a cave and an underground, crystal-clear lake, 80 metres (260 ft) deep, with an area equivalent to the size of a football field. Snorkeling or diving reveal the breathtaking beauty of this place: some of the largest underwater stalagmites in the world, up to 18 metres (59 ft) high.
- Rio da Prata (Silver River) – This snorkeling tour features crystal-clear water, abundant fish, a walk through the forest and a delicious lunch.
- Aquário Natural (Natural Aquarium) – The tour starts with a 25-minute walk through the jungle, followed by a 900 metres (3,000 ft) snorkel, where you float with fish and appreciate the underwater vegetation. After starting the trek where you can see varieties of animals of the region, you can finish with a visit to the museum of natural history.
- Circuito Arvorismo (The trees circuit) – The adventure trek allows you to walk through the treetops on a suspended steel walkway installed in native trees such as aroeira and mahogany. The walkways have platforms fixed in the trees, varying in height from 10 to 20 metres (33 to 66 ft).
- Gruta do Lago Azul Natural Monument (Blue Lake Cave) – The tour starts with a 10-minute walk to the entrance of the cave, which was discovered by a local Indian in 1924. In its interior, after descending 100 metres (330 ft), it is possible to see the lake of crystal clear water and depth of approximately 90 metres (300 ft), which makes it one of world’s biggest flooded caves.

==== Tour agencies ====
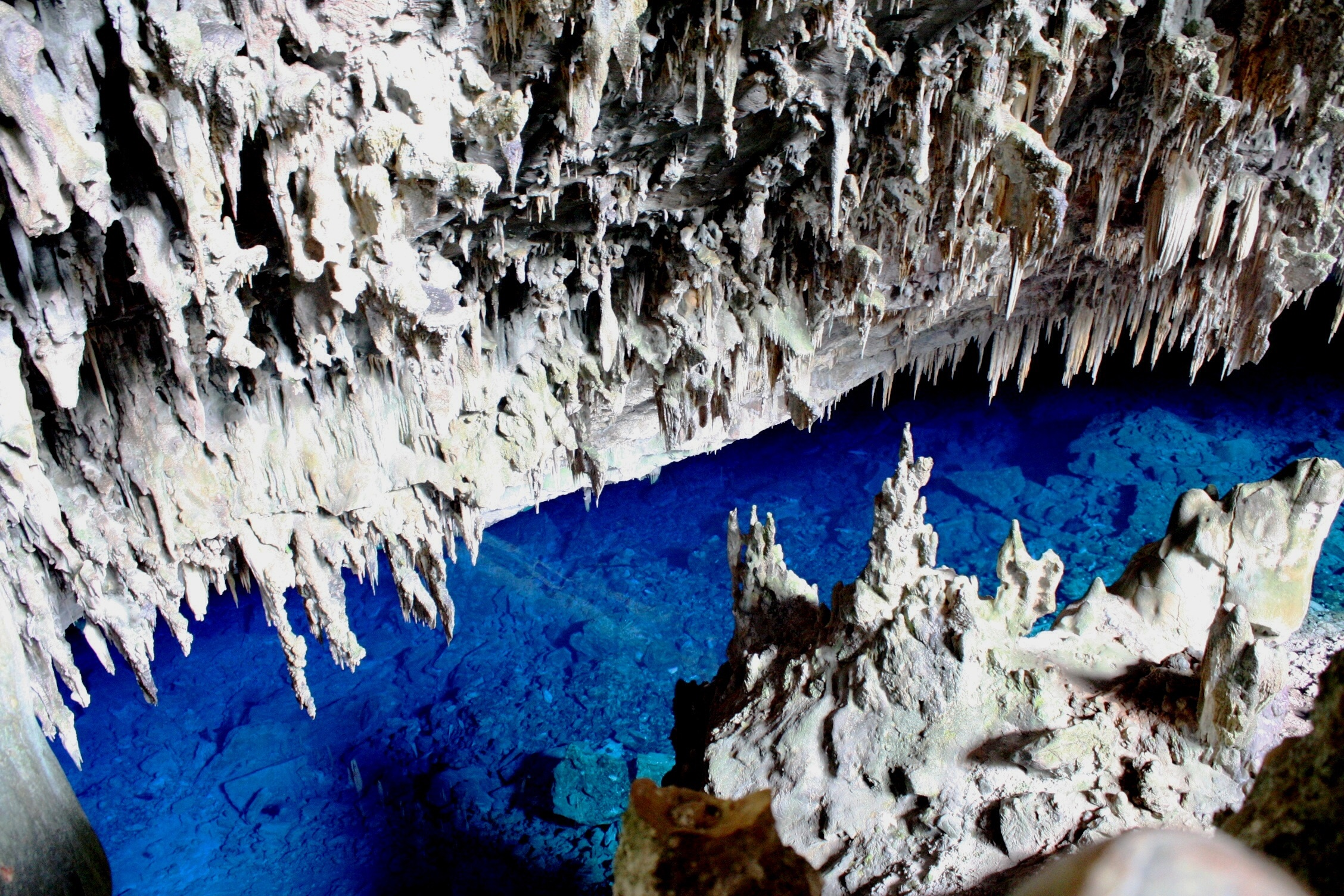
Blue Lake Cave

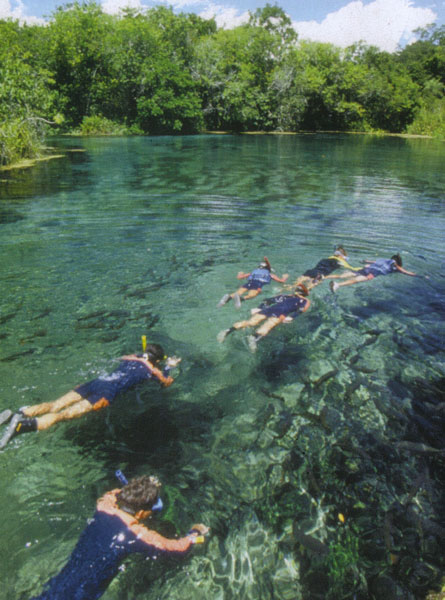
People snorkeling in the river

There are many tour agencies in Bonito. They can be found in the town's hotels and pousadas (small hotels). It is recommended to consult tour agencies when looking for accommodation in the area.

==== Hospitality ====
Bonito has a full range of hotels and pousadas (small hotels), from expensive five-star resorts to backpacker-budget accommodations. In the holiday season (July and December to March), accommodation can be very hard to find and prices also rise accordingly. English is spoken at the more expensive hotels and resorts, but very few of the lower-priced hotels have competent English speakers.

== Transportation ==
The most common way to reach Bonito is through Campo Grande International Airport, which is located in the capital of Mato Grosso do Sul state; this airport provides links to and from all the major cities in Brazil. From Campo Grande International Airport there is the option of either taking an air-taxi or going to the city by land.

- There are 2 flights per week from Campo Grande to Bonito on Thursdays and Fridays, offered by TRIP Linhas Aéreas.

- There are also several options of buses and vans that take around 4 hours to reach Bonito on the 300-kilometre (190 mi) journey.

- Busses from neighboring cities are available, usually arriving from transfer through Dourados. The journey from Foz do Iguazu begins with a 4:45pm bus ride, with a transfer in Dourados around 7:00am, with a three or four-hour stopover in between.

In February 2013, Azul Brazilian Airlines announced that it would begin offering direct flights to Bonito Airport twice weekly from Viracopos International Airport in Campinas. This move has been very important for the city's growing tourist numbers.

Taxis are available for the 12 km-long (7.5 mi) trip from Bonito Airport into the city.

== See also ==
- List of municipalities in Mato Grosso do Sul
