= Gruta do Lago Azul Natural Monument =

- IUCN category III (natural monument or feature)
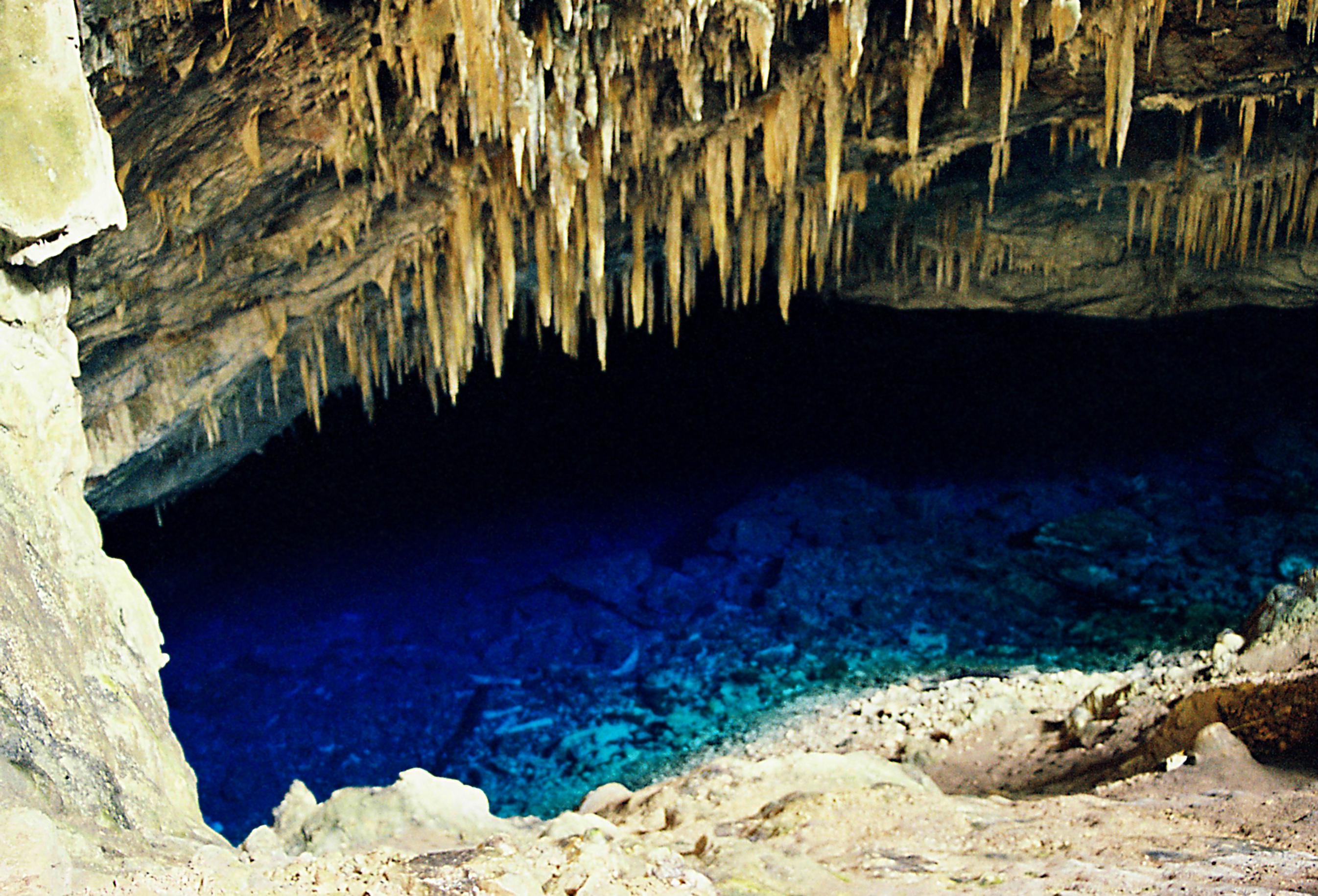

- Location within Brazil
- Nearest city: Bonito, Mato Grosso do Sul, Brazil
- Coordinates: 21.1447°S 56.5915°W
- Designation: Natural monument
- Created: 1978

Gruta do Lago Azul Natural Monument (Blue Lake Cave) is a natural monument in Bonito, Mato Grosso do Sul, Brazil. It holds two caves with interesting but fragile calcareous formations, and has been listed as a protected area since 1978.

== Description ==
The Gruta do Lago Azul has a main hall with a floor that slopes to a subterranean lake over 50 metres (160 ft) long. The entrance is circular, about 40 metres (130 ft) in diameter, illuminating the lake with sunshine. Between the months of September and February the waters take on an intense blue color, for which the lake is named. Fossil bones have been found of large mammals that inhabited the region for more than 12,000 years in the Pleistocene. These include giant sloths, armadillos and sabre-toothed tigers.

The Gruta de Nossa Senhora Aparecida does not contain water and has little natural light. It has a single, large hall with a sloping floor 100 metres (330 ft) at its widest. The hall contains speleothems, some of which are called "angels" since they resemble humans with wings. The Gruta de Nossa Senhora Aparecida is closed to visitors for safety reasons.

== History ==
The Gruta do Lago Azul and the Grutas de Nossa Senhora Aparecida, both in Bonito, Mato Grosso do Sul, were listed as natural monuments in 1978 by the National Institute of Historic and Artistic Heritage (IPHAN). The objective is to preserve the very fragile calcareous structures in the cave, the lake and its aquatic ecosystem, and the landscape around the caves. Visitors are allowed, accompanied by guides from the municipality of Bonito. Regulations are designed to prevent any damage to the cave.

== Sources ==
- "Preservar é Bonito" (PDF), iphan.gov.br (in Portuguese), IPHAN: Instituto do Patrimônio Histórico e Artístico Nacional
