= Bonito Airport =

Bonito Airport Aeroporto de Bonito
- IATA: BYO; ICAO: SBDB; LID: MS0004

Summary
- Airport type: Public
- Serves: Bonito
- Time zone: BRT−1 (UTC−04:00)
- Elevation AMSL: 334 m (1,096 ft)
- Coordinates: 21°14′50″S 056°27′09″W

Map
- Location in Brazil

Runways
Direction	Length		Surface
Direction	m	ft	Surface
18/36	2,000	6,562	Asphalt
- Sources: ANAC, DECEA

Bonito Airport (IATA: BYO, ICAO: SBDB) is the airport serving Bonito, Brazil.

== History ==
The airport was commissioned in 2005.

== Airlines and destinations ==
Airlines	Destinations
Azul Brazilian Airlines	Campinas
Gol Linhas Aéreas	São Paulo–Congonhas (ends 30 January 2027)
LATAM Brasil	São Paulo–Guarulhos

== Access ==
The airport is located 13 km (8 mi) from downtown Bonito.

== See also ==
- List of airports in Brazil
