= Ivinhema =

- Municipality
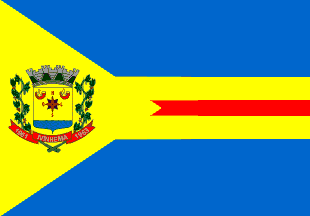
- Flag

- Location in Mato Grosso do Sul state

- Location in Brazil
- Coordinates: 22°18′18″S 53°48′54″W
- Country: Brazil
- Region: Central-West
- State: Mato Grosso do Sul

Population (2020)
  - Total: 23,232
- Time zone: UTC−4 (AMT)

Ivinhema is a municipality located in the Brazilian state of Mato Grosso do Sul. Its population was 23,232 (2020) and its area is 2,010 km^{2} (780 sq mi).

- Agropecuary, and pecuary.
- Mayor City: Juliano Ferro

== Geography ==
=== Climate ===
Climate data for Ivinhema (1981–2010 normals, extremes 1966–1984, 1993–present)
Month	Jan	Feb	Mar	Apr	May	Jun	Jul	Aug	Sep	Oct	Nov	Dec	Year
Record high °C (°F)	38.1 (100.6)	38.8 (101.8)	38.7 (101.7)	37.1 (98.8)	35.4 (95.7)	32.7 (90.9)	34.3 (93.7)	38.0 (100.4)	40.3 (104.5)	41.1 (106.0)	39.0 (102.2)	38.4 (101.1)	41.1 (106.0)
Mean daily maximum °C (°F)	32.2 (90.0)	32.1 (89.8)	31.7 (89.1)	30.3 (86.5)	26.5 (79.7)	26.1 (79.0)	26.9 (80.4)	28.9 (84.0)	29.5 (85.1)	31.5 (88.7)	31.3 (88.3)	32.1 (89.8)	29.9 (85.8)
Daily mean °C (°F)	26.0 (78.8)	25.8 (78.4)	25.4 (77.7)	23.7 (74.7)	20.1 (68.2)	19.4 (66.9)	19.4 (66.9)	21.1 (70.0)	22.2 (72.0)	24.7 (76.5)	24.9 (76.8)	25.9 (78.6)	23.2 (73.8)
Mean daily minimum °C (°F)	21.7 (71.1)	21.5 (70.7)	21.0 (69.8)	19.0 (66.2)	15.5 (59.9)	14.4 (57.9)	13.9 (57.0)	15.3 (59.5)	16.7 (62.1)	19.5 (67.1)	20.1 (68.2)	21.1 (70.0)	18.3 (64.9)
Record low °C (°F)	14.2 (57.6)	14.0 (57.2)	9.0 (48.2)	5.8 (42.4)	2.4 (36.3)	1.4 (34.5)	0.2 (32.4)	0.0 (32.0)	4.4 (39.9)	7.8 (46.0)	10.6 (51.1)	12.3 (54.1)	0.0 (32.0)
Average precipitation mm (inches)	205.5 (8.09)	177.0 (6.97)	121.8 (4.80)	105.9 (4.17)	110.4 (4.35)	65.3 (2.57)	47.5 (1.87)	51.0 (2.01)	120.3 (4.74)	155.5 (6.12)	165.2 (6.50)	185.2 (7.29)	1,510.6 (59.47)
Average precipitation days (≥ 1.0 mm)	12	10	8	6	6	5	4	4	7	9	9	10	90
Average relative humidity (%)	78.0	77.9	75.2	73.7	75.1	72.8	67.2	61.5	64.1	70.5	71.8	73.1	71.7
Mean monthly sunshine hours	207.3	190.3	226.0	221.8	198.3	201.0	221.8	226.2	183.3	202.3	221.0	225.5	2,524.8
Source: Instituto Nacional de Meteorologia
