= Federal Territory of Amapá =

Former federal territory of Brazil

Federal Territory of Amapá Território Federal do Amapá
- Federal territory of Brazil
- 1943–1988
- Map of the Federal Territory of Amapá (1953)
- Capital: Macapá
- History
  - Established: 13 September 1943
  - Statehood: 5 October 1988
Preceded by	Succeeded by
Pará	Amapá

The Federal Territory of Amapá was a federal territory of Brazil that existed from 1943 to 1988. It was created from part of the state of Pará on 13 September 1943, during the presidency of Getúlio Vargas. Its territory corresponds to the present-day state of Amapá.

== History ==
The territory was established on 13 September 1943 by Decree-Law No. 5,812, which created several federal territories in Brazil during the Second World War. The territory was established from a portion of the state of Pará. The federal government appointed Janary Gentil Nunes as its first governor on 27 December 1943. He arrived in Macapá on 25 January 1944, when the territorial government was formally installed. Although the municipality of Amapá was initially designated as the capital, Nunes made Macapá the seat of government.

On 5 October 1988, the territory was elevated to statehood under the 1988 Constitution of Brazil, becoming the state of Amapá.
