= Federal Territory of Iguaçu =

Brazilian federal territory from 1943 to 1946

Political-administrative organisation of Brazil into states and federal territories in 1943. Iguaçu Territory is shown in red in present-day states of Santa Catarina and Paraná (South Region).

Iguaçu Territory (Portuguese: Território Federal do Iguaçu) was a Brazilian federal territory from 1943 to 1946. It was located in the south region of Brazil.

During its three years of existence, the territory had two military governors: João Garcez do Nascimento and Frederico Trotta. The demarcation of the boundary of the territory was also changed at least once during its existence: in 1944, to incorporate the capital region, Iguaçu (current Laranjeiras do Sul), to the territory.

== State of Iguaçu (proposed) ==
Soon after the termination of the Federal Territory of Iguaçu, in 1946, there was a favorable movement that proposed to rebuild the territory which was abolished, this time as a new state. This occurred especially in cities where projects funded by the federal government, such as schools and roads had been initiated because these works were stalled when the extinction of the territory took place.

The city of Cascavel eventually became the epicenter for disseminating the idea of creating the state of Iguaçu, leading the so-called Pró-Criação do “Estado do Iguaçu”.

== See also ==
- Iguaçu
- States of Brazil
- History of Brazil
