= Federal Territory of Ponta Porã =

Former territorial division of Brazil (1943-1946)

Território Federal de Ponta Porã
- Federal territory of Brazil
- 1943-1946
- Federal Territory of Ponta Porã in 1943
- Capital: Ponta Porã (September 1943–May 1944); Maracaju (June–December 1946)
- Area
  - Coordinates: 21°53′50.64″S 55°59′52.64″W
  - Type: Federal territory
- History
  - Dismembered from Mato Grosso: 13 September 1943
  - Dissolution of the territory: 18 September 1946
Preceded by	Succeeded by
Mato Grosso	Mato Grosso

The Federal Territory of Ponta Porã (Portuguese: Território Federal de Ponta Porã) was composed of seven municipalities dismembered from the south of Mato Grosso: Bela Vista, Dourados, Maracaju, Miranda, Nioaque, Ponta Porã and Porto Murtinho. All of them were border areas and some of them comprised the extremity of Brazil's political-administrative possessions. The administrative unit was established in 1944 between the Paraná and Paraguay, rivers with important fluvial circulation in the southern region of Mato Grosso. Throughout its existence, the Federal Territory of Ponta Porã was administered by three governors: Colonel Ramiro Noronha, Major José Guiomard dos Santos and José Alves de Albuquerque.

== Administrative organization ==
At the beginning of 1944, Colonel Ramiro Noronha was appointed as the first governor of the Federal Territory of Ponta Porã, but only began his administration nine months later in October. Noronha resigned in November 1945 with the deposition of President Getúlio Vargas and the post was assumed temporarily by Leônidas Horta, director of the Education and Culture Division. In the same month, Major José Guiomard dos Santos was indicated as his replacement, but only held the position for two months, due to his appointment to take over the government of the Territory of Acre. José Alves de Albuquerque, a doctor from the Boundary Commission, was appointed to replace him and held the post until September 1946, when the Territory of Ponta Porã was abolished. According to the newspaper of the time:

Yesterday, the President of the Republic signed a decree removing Colonel Ramiro Noronha from the post of Governor of the Federal Territory of Ponta Porã and appointing Major José Guiomard dos Santos to replace him. However, in February 1946, this military officer was appointed governor of the Federal Territory of Acre by the President of the Republic, Eurico Gaspar Dutra (1946-1951), replacing Luís Alberto Gomes Coelho. He was replaced by Dr. José Alves de Albuquerque, who remained governor of the Federal Territory of Ponta Porã until it was abolished by the 1946 Constitution.

Among the territories created by Decree-Law No. 5,812, under the administration of Getúlio Vargas, the "[...] Federal Territory of Ponta Porã [...] is the one with the largest number of municipalities and, economically, the most important, and could serve as the basis of a Brazilian-Paraguayan community, which would have the Northwestern Railroad as its main route."

== Change of capital ==
The capital alternated between the cities of Maracaju and Ponta Porã. Overall, the territory was based for the first eight months (September 1943 to May 1944) and the last six months (June 1946 to December 1946), totaling 14 months in the city of Ponta Porã and 25 months in Maracaju. On the move from the capital to Maracaju:

Serious criticism can also be directed at the geographical location of its capital. Why did they remove it from Ponta Porã, when the Paraguayan government, following the same line as the Brazilian government, created the Territory of Amambaí, with the town of Juan Caballero as its capital? Why didn't they locate it in Campo Grande? Why didn't they locate it in Nioaque, a city steeped in tradition, whose roads still bear the traces of the heroes of the Laguna retreat who rested there? Why, finally, did they place it in Maracaju, an artificial city that will lose its expression when the road extends into the Paraguayan hinterland?

The capital moved to Maracaju because of the railway station inaugurated there in April 1944, which favored and accelerated communication and the transport of people and goods, especially between the city and Campo Grande and, respectively, to the capital of Brazil and other large urban centers. Maracaju's location was also a boost, as it was destined to be the center of the Territory's communication routes. The change surprised the inhabitants of Ponta Porã, as well as the legislators and the governor, who was opposed to the relocation at the time, although he was initially in favor of it. However, the administrative seat returned to Ponta Porã under Decree-Law No. 9,380 of June 18, 1946.

== See also ==
- Iguaçu Territory
