= Nova Andradina =

Coordinates: 22°13′58″S 53°20′34″W

- Municipality
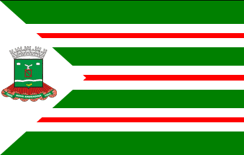
- Flag Coat of arms
- Nickname: Cidade do Sorriso (Smile City)
- Location in Brazil
- Country: Brazil
- Region: Center-West
- State: Mato Grosso do Sul
- Founded: 1958

Government
  - Mayor: José Gilberto Garcia (PMDB)
- Elevation: 380 m (1,250 ft)

Population (2020)
  - Total: 45,585
  - Density: 9.1/km^{2} (24/sq mi)
- Time zone: UTC−4 (AMT)
- HDI (2000): 0.786 – medium
- Website: Nova Andradina, MS

Nova Andradina is a municipality located in the Brazilian state of Mato Grosso do Sul. Its population was 45,585 (2020) and its area is 4,776 km^{2}. It is known as the "Capital of the Ivinhema Valley."

The area has many farms, and its primary industries are those involving farming: cattle and grain.

== History ==
The lands that today comprise the City of New Andradina and the extensive surrounding area were colonized by Paulo Antonio Joaquim de Moura Andrade, a farmer with extraordinary vision and unusual skill. He began his colonization work in Mato Grosso around 1938 or 1939, when the state acquired the Farm "Caapora," which was later renamed Spring Farm. It was located near the bay of the Rio Formosa Fern, in the jungle, in the valley of the Rio Parana, where he soon set out to construct a river port on the right bank of the Paraná River, which would serve as the basis for the realization of the project. Years later, Moura Andrade expanded his domains by acquiring the farms of Santa Barbara, Ball, Xavante, and Panambi.

The farm originally belonged to Henry Ball Barbosa Martins and then Domingos Barbosa Martins, both members of the clan of Barbosa Martins who wrote brilliant pages in the history of Mato Grosso and constitute one of the most traditional families of Mato Grosso do Sul Baile The farm was acquired by Moura Andrade in 1951. In the second half of 1957, he noted a tract of the farm where he set the foundations of the city of New Andradina. Then proceeded to the allotment of other farms, establishing great advantages for buyers, which led to the arrival of large waves of migrants, especially the Northeast, São Paulo, Paraná and Minas Gerais, determining rapid settlement of the region. In the same year, in a shack Company Andrade Ferreira de Souza that it was opening the city streets, installed the first school of the new community, having as teachers Efantina Tables, popularly known as D. Lala, Katsuko and Mariko Fujibayashi and Cecilia Holland.

The next year we built a brick building, which was renamed the School Group Moura Andrade. New Andradina was elevated to the Village, District and County on December 20, 1958. The first Mass was celebrated by Fr Luiz, in the chapel of the Immaculate Heart of Mary, newly built in the new settlement. The first shop around implanted belonged to Kokey Itaya. The first Justice of the Peace was Austrilio Capilé Castro and the first Scribe was the lady Irma Ribeiro da Silva. Between 1967 and 1969, the then mayor, Mr Alcides Menezes de Faria worked to bring sanitation and electricity to the city.

== Subdivisions ==
Nova Casa Verde district is located in the broader municipality of Nova Andradina.

== Mayors ==
1. ª Management: (1962-1966) Teutly Soares Piglet (PSD) - Vice: Antonio Nunes Costa

2. ª Management: (1967-1969) Alcides Menezes de Faria (ARENA) - Vice: Alonso Severino da Silva

3. ª Management: (1970-1972) Decius Azevedo Mattos (ARENA) - Vice: Clarindo da Silva Nantes

4. ª Management: (1973-1976) Alcides Menezes de Faria (ARENA) - Vice: Waldecir Franzoni Barbosa

5. ª Management: (1977-1982) Antonio Migliorini Rozario (ARENA) - Vice: Durval Andrade Filho

6. ª Management: (1983-1988) Getúlio Gideon Bauermeister - Vice: Luiz Carlos Ortega

7. ª Management: (1989-1982) Durval Andrade Filho (PFL) - Vice: Tyokaio Oshiro

8. ª Management: (1993-1996) Dr. Francisco Dantas Maniçoba (PMDB) - Vice: Silvio Pereira de Oliveira Vivaldo

9. ª Management: (1997-2000) Luiz Carlos Ortega Batel (PTB) - Vice: Antonio Rosario Migliorini

10. ª Management: (2001-2004) Roberto Hashioka Soller (PL) - Vice Helder José de Faria (PT)

11. ª Management: (2005-2008) Roberto Hashioka Soller (PL) - Vice Helder José de Faria (PT)

12. ª Management: (2009-2012) José Gilberto Garcia (PMDB) - Vice: Raulino Baronceli-DEM

13. ª Management: (2012-2015) Roberto Hashioka Soller (PMDB) - Vice Milton Sena

== First Ladies ==
1. ª Management: (1962 ~ 1966) Maria Aparecida Possum Piglet

2. ª Management: (1967 ~ 1969) Maria Romilda de Faria

3. ª Management: (1970 ~ 1972) Jaci Azevedo Mattos

4. ª Management: (1973 ~ 1976) Maria Romilda de Faria

5. ª Management: (1977 ~ 1982) Miriam Migliorini

6. ª Management: (1983 ~ 1988) Marcia Bauermeister

7. ª Management: (1989 ~ 1982) Amelia Andrade

8. ª Management: (1993 ~ 1996) Fatima Maniçoba

9. ª Management: (1997 ~ 2000) Aparecida Ortega

10. ª Management: (2001-2004) Dione Hashioka

11. ª Management: (2005-2008) Dione Hashioka

12. ª Management: (2009-2012) Joana Garcia

13. ª Management: (2012-2015) Dione Hashioka
