= Mato Grosso do Sul =

State of Brazil

Coordinates: 20°26′34″S 54°38′45″W

- State
- Flag Coat of arms
- Anthem: Hino de Mato Grosso do Sul
- Location in Brazil
- Country: Brazil
- Region: Central-West
- Capital and largest city: Campo Grande

Government
  - Type: Unitary state
  - Governor: Eduardo Riedel (PP)
  - Vice Governor: José Carlos Barbosa (Republicanos)
  - Senators: Nelsinho Trad (PSD); Tereza Cristina (PP); Soraya Thronicke (PSB)
  - Legislature: Legislative Assembly of Mato Grosso do Sul

Area
  - Total: 357,124.962 km^{2} (137,886.719 sq mi)
  - Rank: 6th

Population (2026)
  - Total: 2,946,317
  - Rank: 21st
  - Density: 8.250101/km^{2} (21.36766/sq mi)
  - Rank: 20th
- Demonym: Sul-mato-grossense or Mato-grossense-do-sul

GDP (2024)
  - Total: R$181.341 billion (US$33.651 billion)

HDI
  - Year: 2024
  - Category: 0.797 – high (12th)
- Time zone: UTC-4 (BRT-1)
- Postal Code: 79000-000 to 79990-000
- ISO 3166 code: BR-MS
- Website: www.ms.gov.br

Mato Grosso do Sul (US: /ˈmɑːtoʊ ˈɡrɔːsoʊ doʊ ˈsuːl/ MAH-toh GRAW-soh doh SOOL, Brazilian Portuguese: [ˈmatu ˈɡɾosu du ˈsuw]; lit. 'South Thick Bush') is one of Brazil's 27 federal units, located in the southern part of the Central-West Region, bordering five Brazilian states: Mato Grosso (to the north), Goiás and Minas Gerais (northeast), São Paulo (east) and Paraná (southeast); and two South American countries: Paraguay (south and southwestern) and Bolivia (west). It is divided into 79 municipalities and covers an area of 357,145.532 square kilometers, which is about the same size as Germany. With a population of 2,946,317 inhabitants in 2026, Mato Grosso do Sul is the 21st most populous state in Brazil.

Campo Grande is the capital and largest city of Mato Grosso do Sul. The economy of the state is largely based on agriculture and cattle-raising. Crossed in the south by the Tropic of Capricorn, Mato Grosso do Sul generally has a warm, sometimes hot, and humid climate, and is crossed by numerous tributaries of the Paraná River. The state has 1.3% of the Brazilian population and is responsible for 1.5% of the Brazilian GDP. Mato Grosso do Sul is also known for its natural environment, and is a destination for domestic and international tourism. The Pantanal lowlands cover 12 municipalities and presents a variety of flora and fauna, with forests, natural sand banks, savannahs, open pasture, fields and bushes. The city Bonito, in the mountain of Bodoquena, has prehistoric caves, natural rivers, waterfalls, swimming pools and the Gruta do Lago Azul cave.

The name Mato Grosso do Sul is Portuguese for "Southern Thick Bush"; the name is inherited from its northern neighbour state of Mato Grosso, from which its split begun on 11 October 1977 and was finalised on 1 January 1979. The state is still commonly referred to as "Mato Grosso" in colloquial speech. Other names that were proposed, at the time of the split and afterwards, include "Pantanal" (a reference to its best known geographical feature) and "Maracaju" (a reference to the Maracaju Mountain Range that crosses the state from north to south).

== Geography ==
=== Climate ===
Map of Köppen climate types of Mato Grosso do Sul

Mato Grosso do Sul has humid subtropical and tropical climates. The average annual rainfall is 1471.1 mm. January is the warmest month, with mean maximum of 34 °C (93.2 °F) and minimum of 24 °C (75.2 °F) and more rain; July experiences the coldest temperatures, with mean maximum of 25 °C (77 °F) and minimum of -2,0 °C (28 °F) and sun.

=== Vegetation ===
The state is located in western Brazil, in a region mostly occupied by the inland marshes of the Pantanal and the cerrado ecosystems.

The cerrado landscape is characterized by extensive savanna formations crossed by gallery forests and stream valleys. This ecosystem includes various types of vegetation. Humid fields and "buriti" palm paths are found where the water table is near the surface. Alpine pastures occur at higher altitudes, and mesophytic forests grow on more fertile soils. The "cerrado" trees have distinctive twisted trunks covered in thick bark, and their leaves are typically broad and rigid. Many herbaceous plants have extensive roots to store water and nutrients. The plants' thick bark and roots serve as adaptations to the periodic fires that sweep through the cerrado landscape, protecting them from destruction and allowing them to sprout again after the fire.

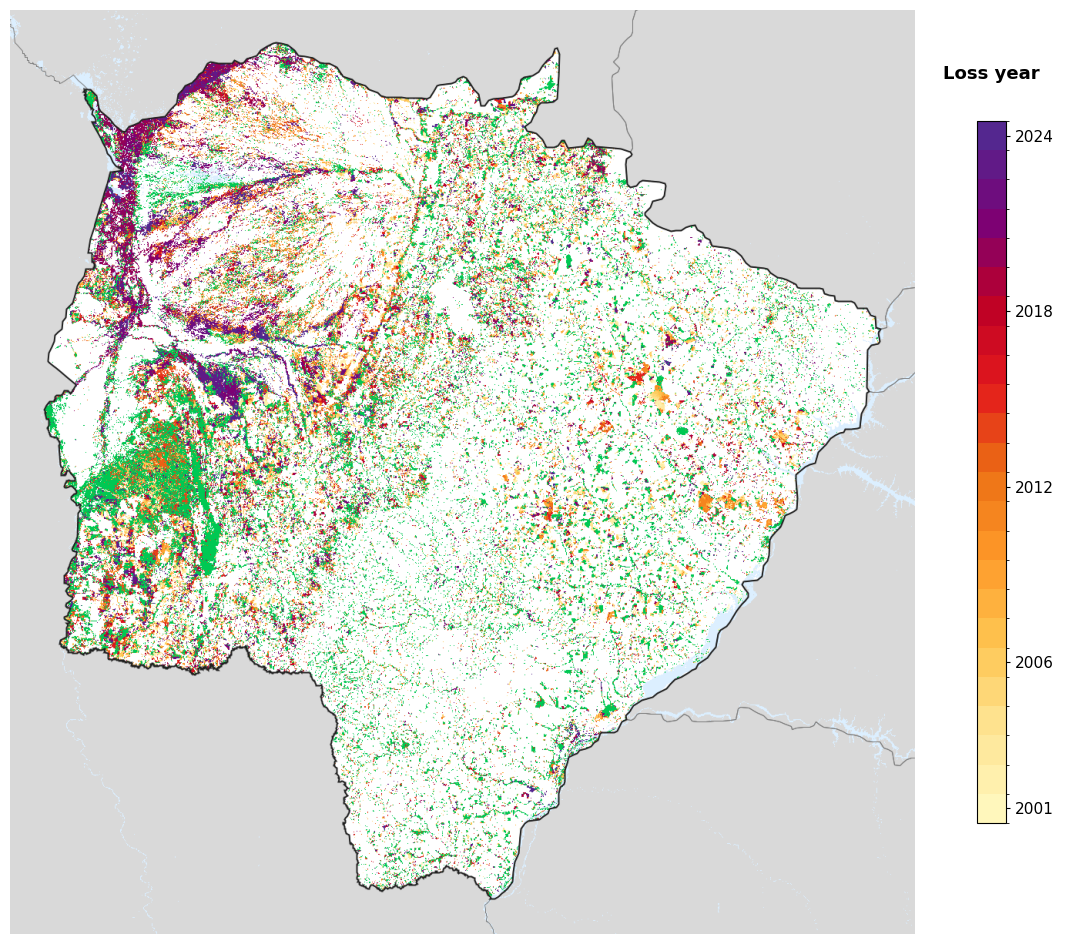
Tree-cover loss year in Mato Grosso do Sul, 2001-2024, from the Global Forest Change dataset.

Agriculture and cattle ranching are major drivers of deforestation in Mato Grosso do Sul. In 2024, over 90,000 hectares of primary forest were deforested. The Pantanal biome has also suffered from increasingly damaging forest fires due to increasing land clearing using fire, combined with drier conditions due to climate change.

The highest elevation is the 1,065 m high Morro Grande.

== History ==
In the 1630s, the Jesuits also established short-lived missions among the Guaraní people in the Itatín region of present-day Mato Grosso do Sul, Brazil. They were destroyed by Bandeirantes and revolts by the indigenous people.

The first peoples or indigenous peoples of Mato Grosso do Sul, particularly occupying the Nhande Ru Marangatu tropical rainforested area, are the Guarani-Kaiowá, first contacted by non-indigenous peoples in the 1800s.

On October 11, 1977, the state was created by dividing the state of Mato Grosso. Its status as a state went into full effect two years later on January 1, 1979. The new state also incorporated the entirety of the former territory of Ponta Porã.

== Demographics ==
Historical population
Year	Pop.	±%
1940	238,640	—
1950	309,395	+29.6%
1960	579,652	+87.4%
1970	1,010,731	+74.4%
1980	1,401,151	+38.6%
1991	1,778,741	+26.9%
2000	2,078,070	+16.8%
2010	2,449,024	+17.9%
2022	2,757,013	+12.6%

According to the IBGE of 2008, there were 2,372,000 people residing in the state. The population density was 6.4 inhabitants/km^{2}.

Urbanization: 84.7% (2006); Population growth: 1.7% (1991–2000); Houses: 689,000 (2006)

The last PNAD (National Research for Sample of Domiciles) census revealed the following numbers: 1,293,797 Brown (Multiracial) people (46.9%), 1,168,407 White people (42.4%), 179,101 Black people (6.5%), 96,029 Amerindian people (3.5%), 19,616 Asian people (0.7%).

In the Cerrado areas, mostly in the south, central and east, there is a predominance of Southern Brazilian farmers of Spanish, German, Portuguese, Italian and Slavic descent.

According to an autosomal DNA study from 2008, the ancestral composition of Mato Grosso do Sul is 73.60% European, 13.90% African and 12.40% Native American. Additionally, according to a different 2013 DNA study, the ancestral composition of Mato Grosso do Sul is: 58.8% European, 25.9% Amerindian and 15.3% African ancestries, respectively.

=== Largest cities ===
Largest cities or towns in Mato Grosso do Sul (2011 census by the Brazilian Institute of Geography and Statistics)
Rank		Mesoregion	Pop.	Rank		Mesoregion	Pop.
1	Campo Grande	Centro-Norte	796 252	11	Maracaju	Sudoeste	38 264
2	Dourados	Sudoeste	198 421	12	Amambai	Sudoeste	35 133
3	Corumbá	Pantanais	104 317	13	Coxim	Centro-Norte	32 258
4	Três Lagoas	Leste	103 536	14	Rio Brilhante	Sudoeste	31 279
5	Ponta Porã	Sudoeste	79 173	15	Caarapó	Sudoeste	26 155
6	Naviraí	Sudoeste	47 173	16	Miranda	Pantanais	25 794
7	Nova Andradina	Leste	46 368	17	Jardim	Sudoeste	24 484
8	Aquidauana	Pantanais	45 781	18	Anastácio	Pantanais	23 939
9	Sidrolândia	Centro-Norte	43 563	19	Bela Vista	Sudoeste	23 290
10	Paranaíba	Leste	40 329	20	Ivinhema	Sudoeste	22 395

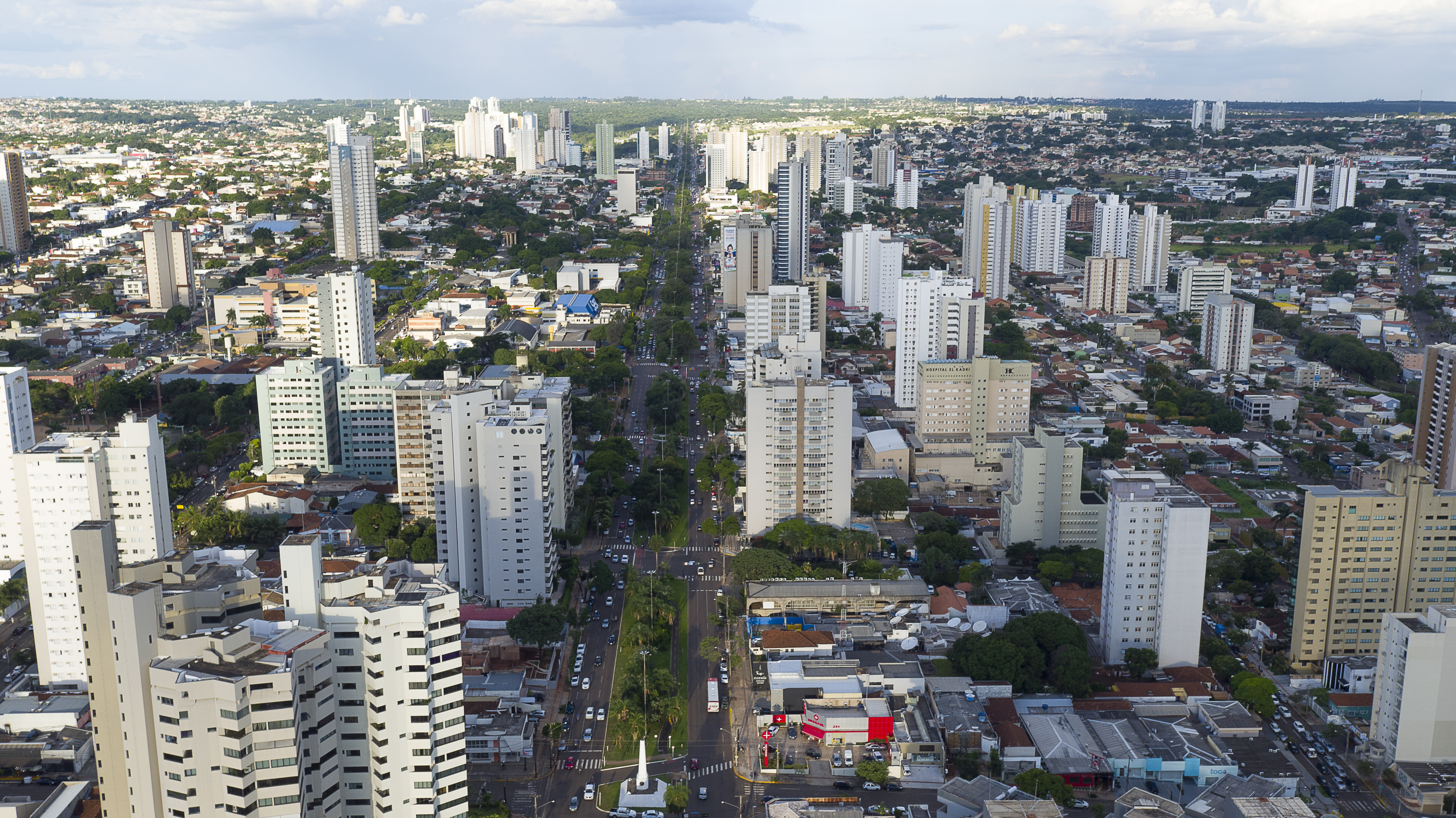
Aerial view of Campo Grande, the capital.

=== Education ===
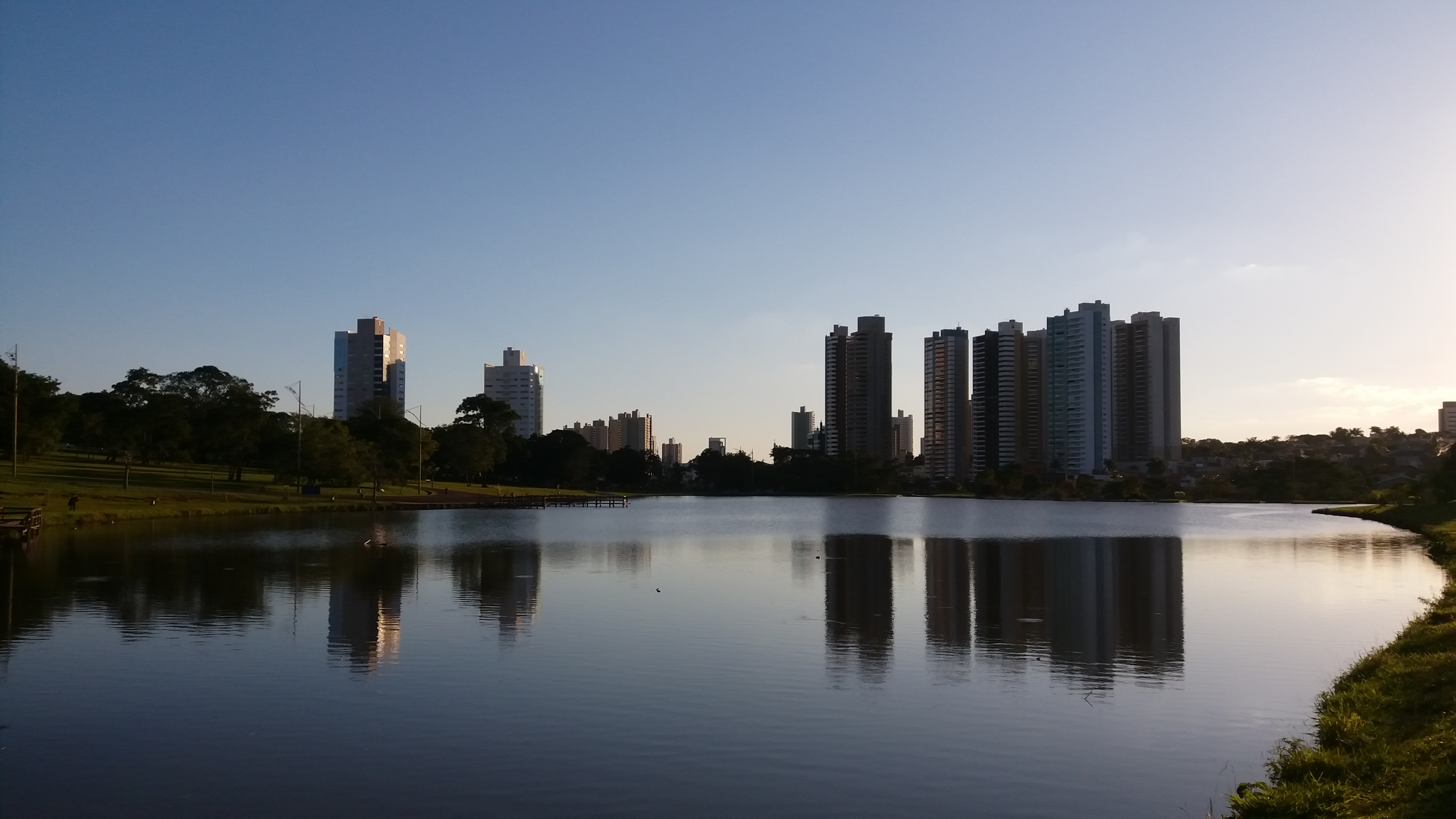
Campo Grande is the most important educational centre of the state.

There are more than 44 universities in whole state of Mato Grosso do Sul.

==== Educational institutions ====
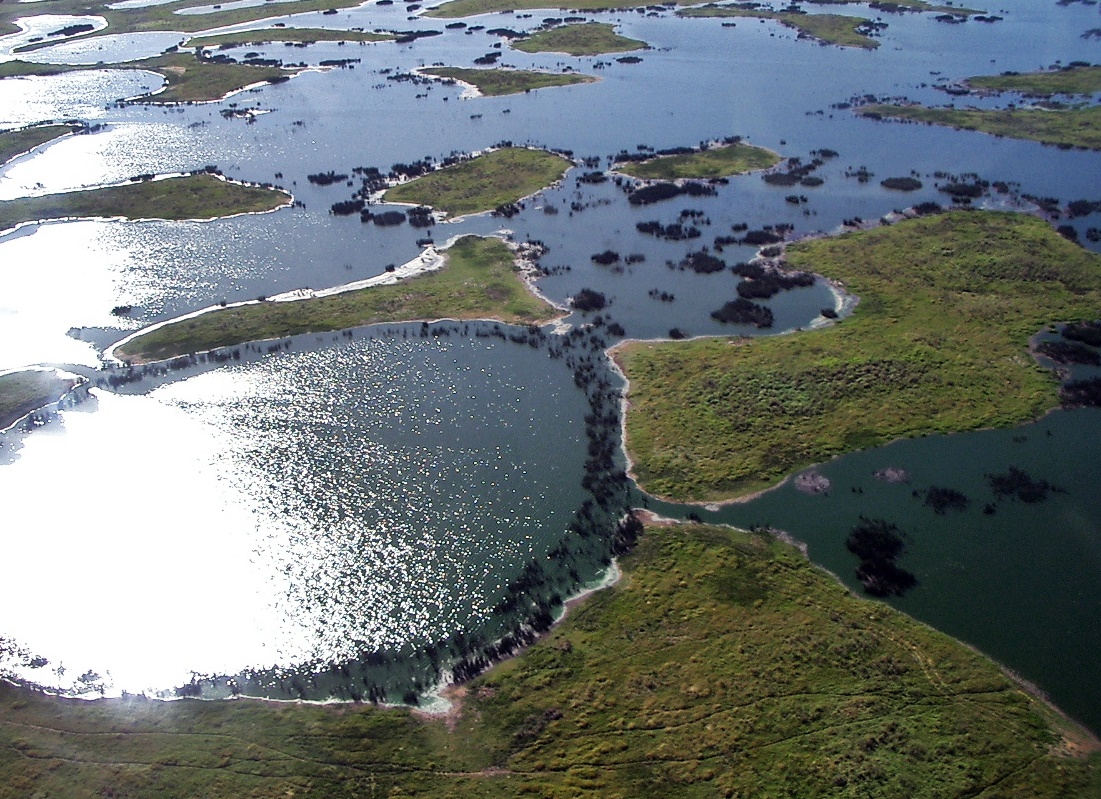
Pantanal

- Universidade Federal de Mato Grosso do Sul (UFMS) (Federal University of Mato Grosso do Sul)
- Instituto Federal de Educação, Ciência e Tecnologia de Mato Grosso do Sul (IFMS) (Federal Institute of Education, Science and Technology of Mato Grosso do Sul)
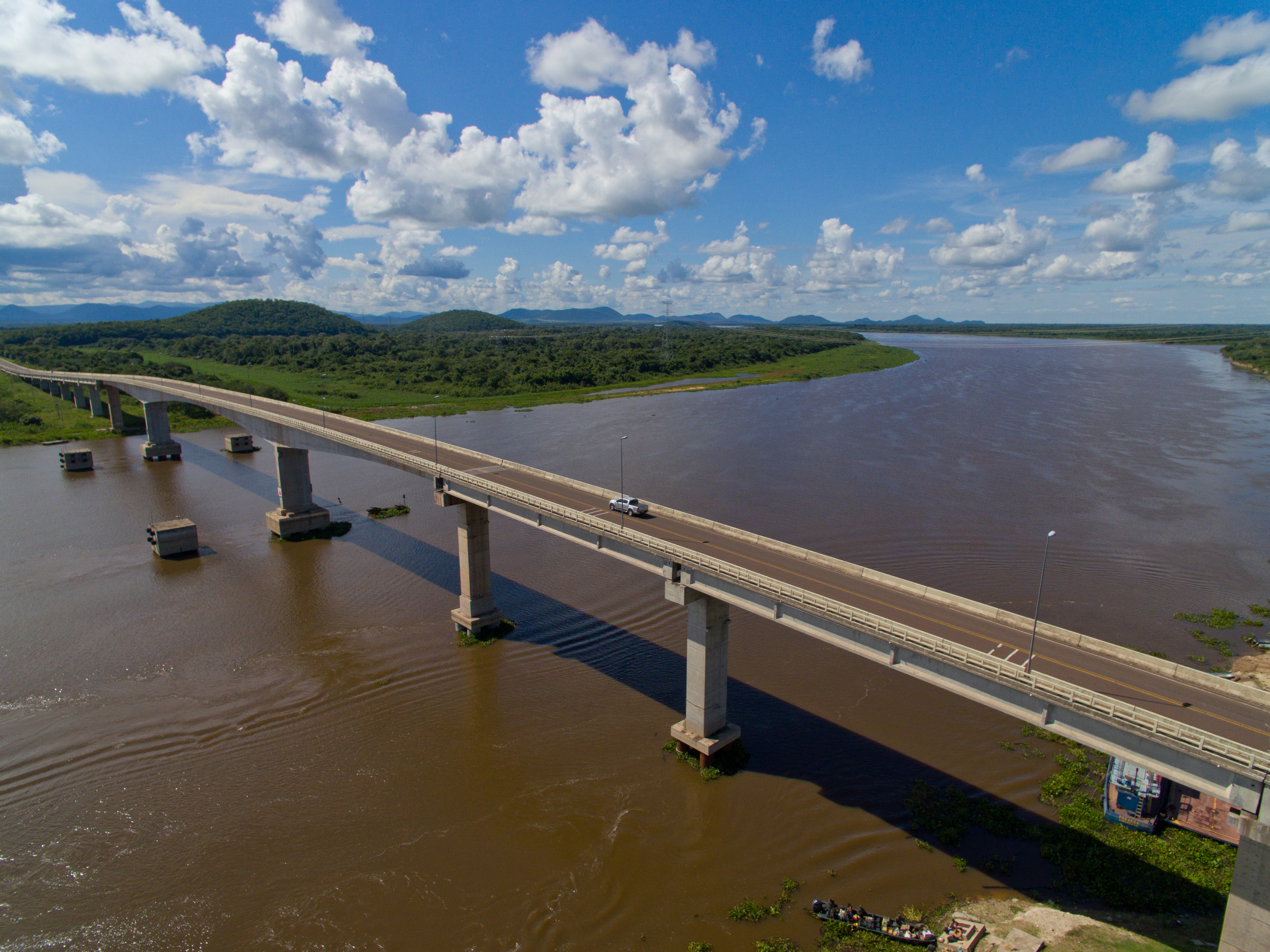
- Paraguay River in Mato Grosso do Sul
  Universidade Estadual de Mato Grosso do Sul (UEMS) (State University of Mato Grosso do Sul)
- Universidade Federal da Grande Dourados (UFGD) (Federal University of Dourados Region)
- Universidade Católica Dom Bosco (UCDB) (Dom Bosco Catholic University)
- Universidade para o Desenvolvimento do Estado e da Região do Pantanal (Uniderp) (University for the Development of the State and Region of the Pantanal)

== Economy ==
The service sector is the largest component of GDP at 46.1%, followed by the industrial sector at 22.7%. Agriculture represents 31.2%, of GDP (2004). Mato Grosso do Sul exports: soybeans 34.9%, pork and chicken 20.9%, beef 13.7%, ores 8%, leather 7.4%, timber 5.1% (2002).

Share of the Brazilian economy: 1% (2005).

=== Agriculture ===
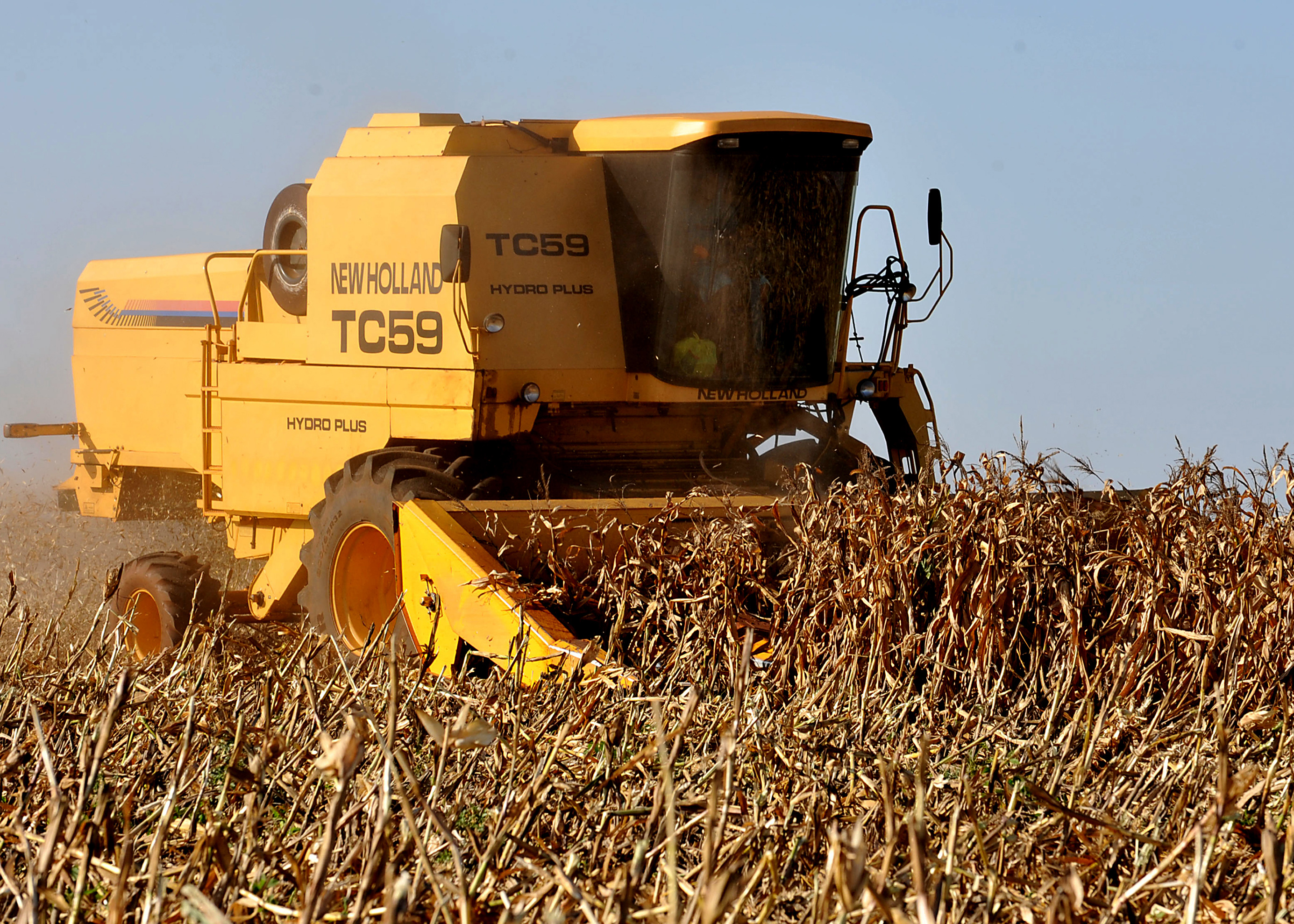
Harvester in a corn plantation in Dourados.

According to data from 2020, if Mato Grosso do Sul were a country, it would be the world's fifth largest producer of oilseeds. In 2020, Mato Grosso do Sul was the 5th biggest grain producer in the country, with 7.9%. In soy, produced 10.5 million tons in 2020, one of the largest producing states in Brazil, around 5th place. It is the 4th largest producer of sugarcane, with around 49 million tons harvested in the 2019/20 harvest. In 2019, Mato Grosso do Sul was also one of the largest producers of maize in the country with 10,1 million tons. In cassava production, Brazil produced a total of 17.6 million tons in 2018. Mato Grosso do Sul was the 6th largest producer in the country, with 721 thousand tons.

=== Livestock ===
The state has the 4th largest cattle herd in Brazil, with a total of 21.4 million head of cattle. The state is a major exporter of beef, but also poultry and pork. In poultry farming, the state had, in 2017, a flock of 22 million birds. In pork, in 2019, Mato Grosso do Sul slaughtered more than 2 million animals. The state occupies the 7th Brazilian position in pig farming, moving towards becoming the 4th largest Brazilian producer in the coming years.

=== Mining ===
In 2017, Mato Grosso do Sul had 0.71% of the national mineral participation (6th place in the country). Mato Grosso do Sul had production of iron (3.1 million tons at a value of R$324 million) and manganese (648 thousand tons at a value of R$299 million).

=== Industry ===
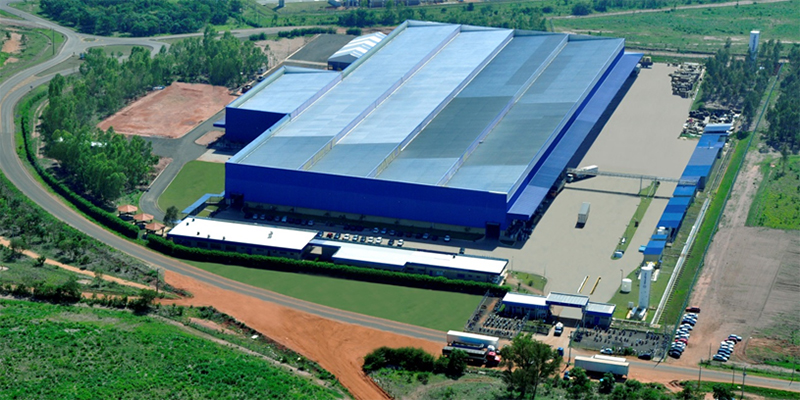
Metalfrio headquarters in Três Lagoas, Brazilian multinational manufacturer of refrigeration equipment.

Mato Grosso do Sul had an industrial GDP of R $19.1 billion in 2017, equivalent to 1.6% of the national industry. It employs 122,162 workers in the industry. The main industrial sectors are: Public Utility Industrial Services, such as Electricity and Water (23.2%), Construction (20.8%), Food (15.8%), Pulp and Paper (15.1%) and Petroleum Derivatives and Biofuels (12.5%). These 5 sectors concentrate 87.4% of the state's industry.

In the city of Três Lagoas, the production of paper and cellulose is considerable. Mato Grosso do Sul recorded growth above the national average in the production of cellulose, reached the mark of 1 million hectares of planted eucalyptus, expanded its industrial park in the sector and consolidated itself as the largest exporter of the product in the country in the first quarter of 2020. Between 2010 and 2018, production in the south of Mato Grosso increased by 308%, reaching 17 million cubic meters of round wood for paper and cellulose in 2018. In 2019, Mato Grosso do Sul reached the leadership of exports in the product in the country, with 9.7 million tons traded: 22.20% of the total Brazilian pulp exports that year.

== Infrastructure ==
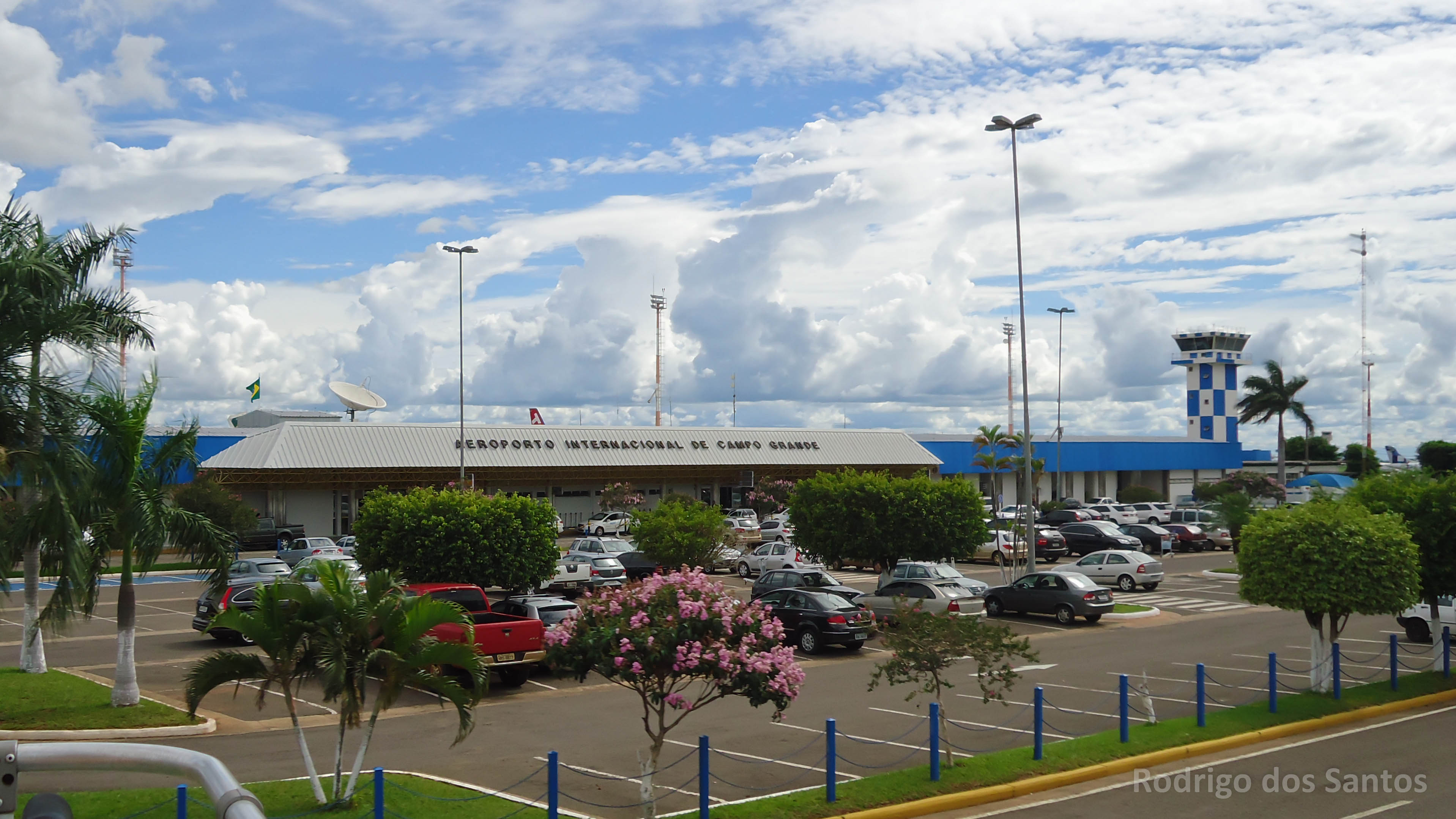
Campo Grande International Airport.

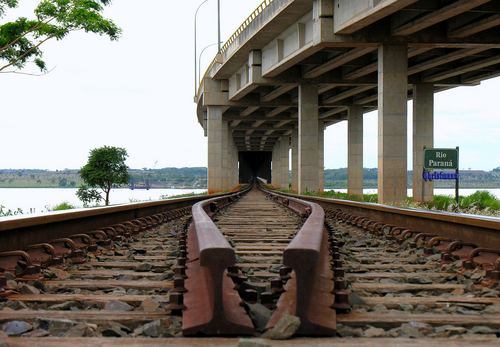
Ferrovia Norte Brasil, stretch over the Paraná River, between the states of Mato Grosso do Sul and São Paulo.

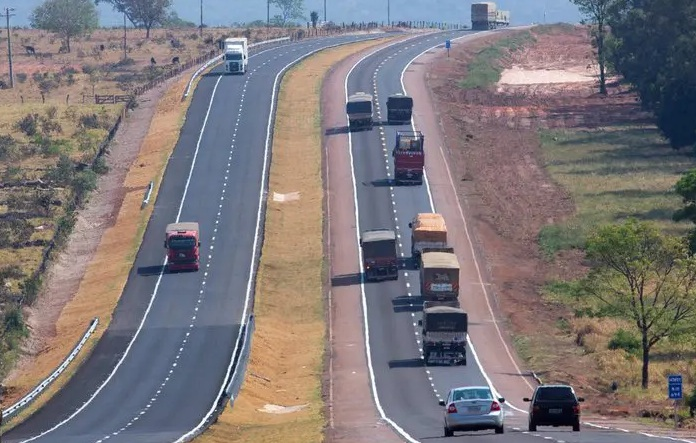
BR-163, duplicate stretch in Mato Grosso do Sul.

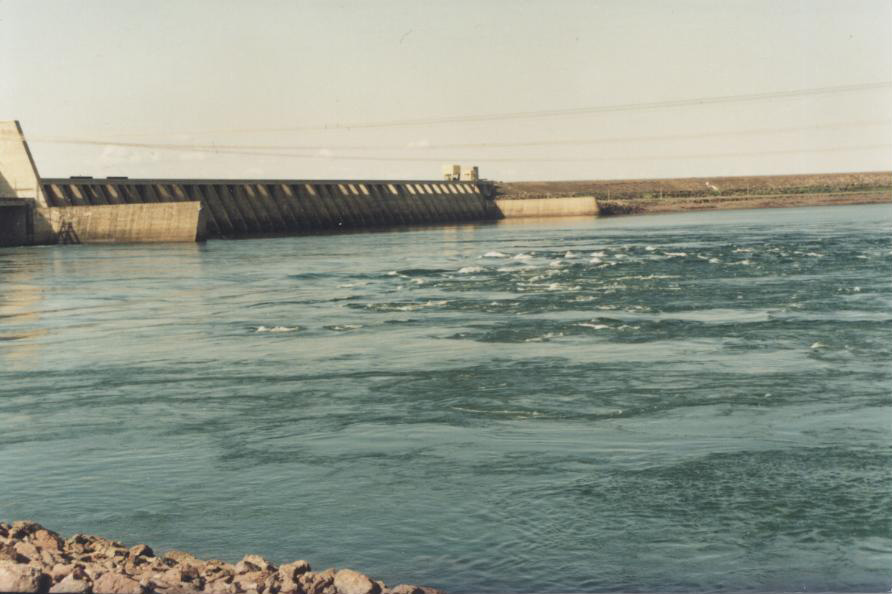
Engineer Souza Dias Dam.

In 2022, Mato Grosso do Sul had, between municipal, Mato Grosso do Sul state and federal highways, 45,176.8 km of municipal highways, 15,084.0 km of Mato Grosso do Sul state highways and 3,197.6 km of federal highways. In 2022 there were about 8,000 km of paved roads (between state and federal highways). In BR-163 there were about 120 km of duplicated highways in 2022, with future planning to have a total of 847 km of duplications, crossing the entire state. Other important highways in the state are BR-262, BR-060 and BR-267. As it is a state that only became more populated in the 1970s, its transport network is in a clear process of evolution, and it continues to be a low-density road network.

The state also has two railway lines: the Estrada de Ferro Noroeste do Brasil, which connects the center-west of the state of São Paulo with the city of Corumbá, in Mato Grosso do Sul, on the Paraguay River, with 1,330 kilometers in length; and Ferrovia Norte Brasil, which has connected the city of Santa Fé do Sul with Rondonópolis since 1989, being one of the main corridors for the flow of grain in the region, with 755 kilometers connect the northwest of São Paulo with the south of Mato Grosso.

River navigation, once again important, is losing its pre-eminence. Two fluvial axes make up the state, both belonging to the Río de la Plata basin. The Paraguay River integrates the state with the neighboring countries Paraguay and Argentina, and with Mato Grosso through the port of Cáceres. The main products transported by the river are: iron and manganese ores, cement, wood, petroleum derivatives and cattle. In 1999, this waterway began transporting sugar, departing from Porto Murtinho. The main ports are Corumbá (Corumbá, Ladário and Porto Esperança) and Porto Murtinho. Finally, the Paraná-Tieté Waterway runs through the Paraná River.

About international Airports:

- Campo Grande - The operation of Campo Grande International Airport is shared with the Campo Grande Air Base. The airport has two runways. Construction of the main runway, made of concrete, began in 1950 and was finished in 1953. The passenger terminal was concluded in 1964, and in 1967 concrete aprons were built for both military and civilian aircraft. As commercial aviation demand grew, it became necessary to widen the civil aircraft apron, which was completed 12 years after its construction. The airport has been administered by Infraero since 1975.
- Corumbá - Corumbá International Airport, located just 3 km (1.86 mi) from the city center, was opened on September 21, 1960, the city's anniversary. Built on a land plot of 290 hectares and at an elevation of 140 meters above sea, it has an asphalt runway measuring 1660 x 30 meters, with one of its thresholds reinforced with concrete for an additional 60 meters. Corumbá International Airport has been administered by Infraero since February 1975.
- Ponta Porã - Ponta Porã International Airport is also administered by Infraero.

=== Other airports ===
- Dourados Regional Airport
- Bonito Airport

== Miscellaneous facts ==
Vehicles: 835,259 (June 2009); Mobile phones: 2.407 million (July/2009); Telephones: 471,000 (April 2007); Cities: 78 (2007)

== Tourism ==
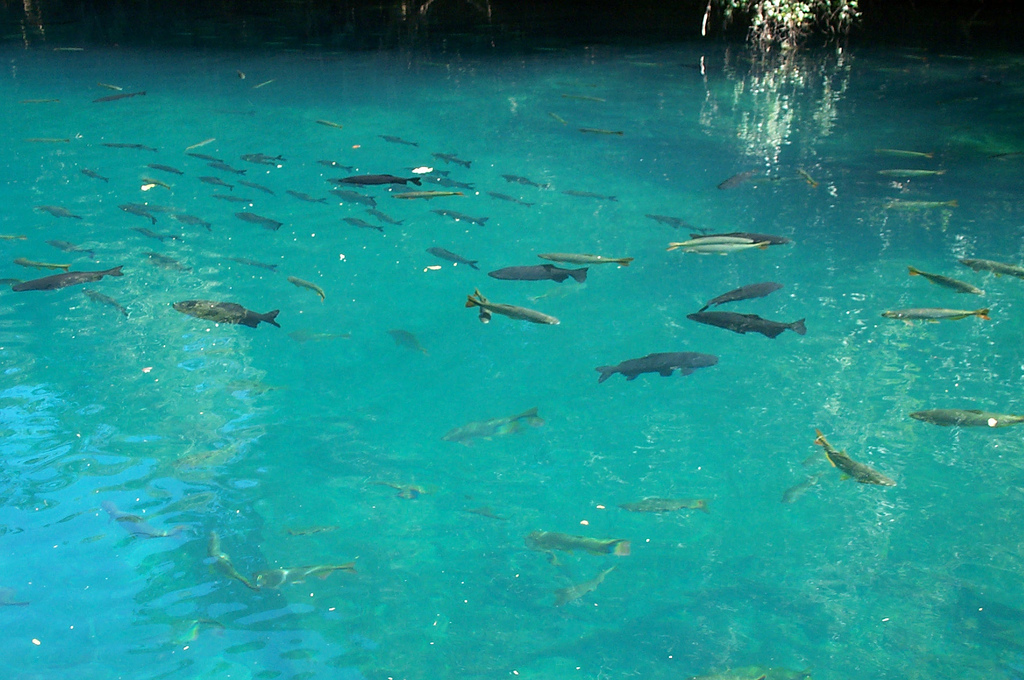
Rio da Prata (River of Silver) in Jardim.

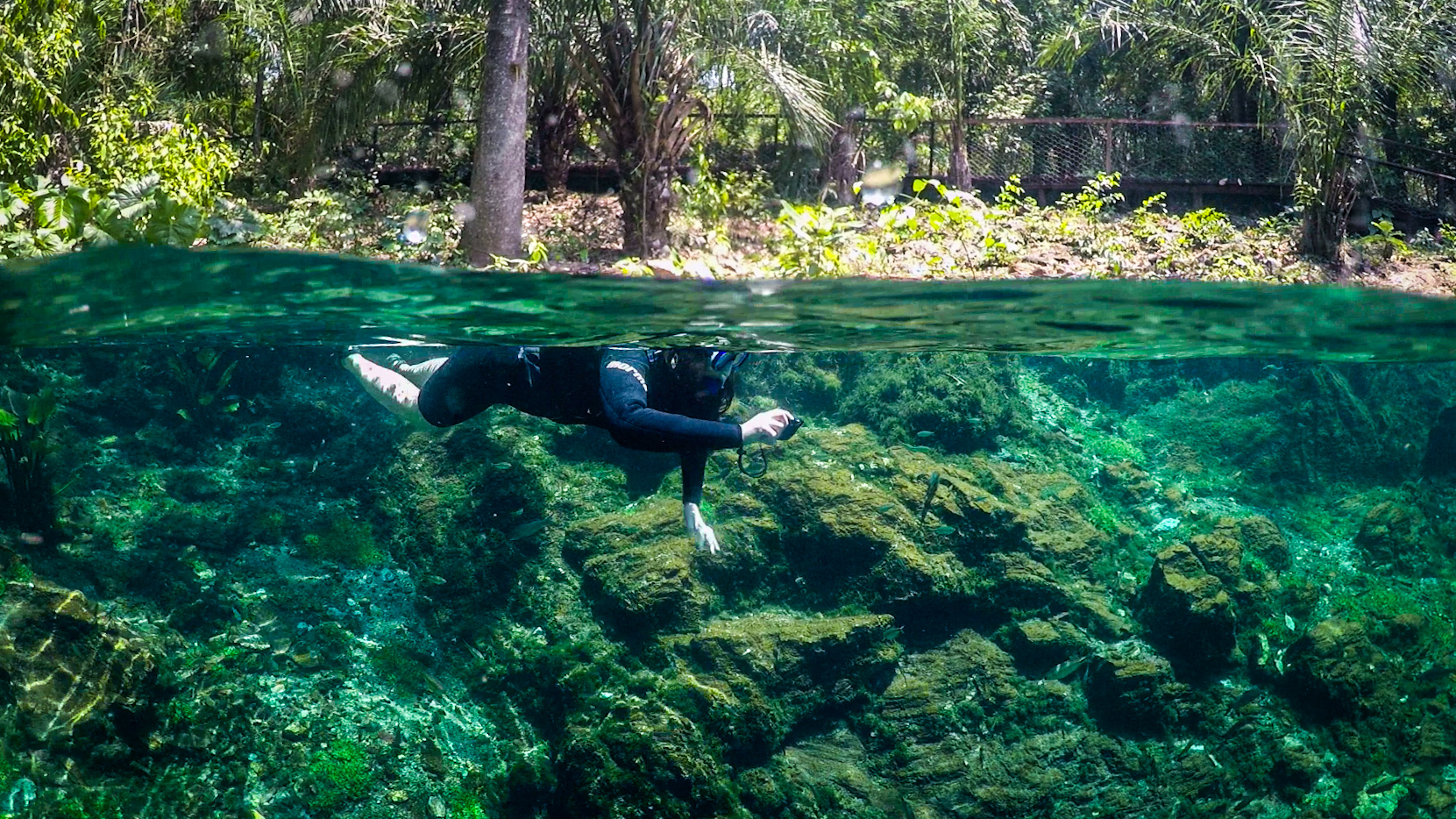
Recreational scuba diver in Bonito.

The most important tourist city in the state is Bonito, considered the capital of ecotourism in Brazil. Its main attractions are the natural landscapes, and the immersions in rivers of transparent waters, waterfalls, caves and sinkholes. Along with Jardim, Guia Lopes da Laguna and Bodoquena, it is the main municipality that integrates the region's tourist complex. The Pantanal is also an area of considerable visitation.

Ponta Porã, Bela Vista and Porto Murtinho, being located on the border with Paraguay, receive many visitors, and with the construction of Bioceanic Corridor, Porto Murtinho will have a considerable increase in business tourism.

== Flag ==
Mato Grosso do Sul's flag was designed by Mauro Michael Munhoz. A white stripe divides an upper left green corner from a bottom right blue space with a yellow star. White symbolizes hope, green is an allusion to the state's rich flora, blue represents its vast sky, while the yellow star adds balance, force and serenity. The star on the flag is Alphard, the brightest star in the constellation Hydra.

== See also ==
- List of municipalities in Mato Grosso do Sul
- Rafael Silva, judoka.
- Leonardo de Deus, swimmer.
- Müller, footballer.
- Izabel Pimentel, sailor.
- Federal Territory of Ponta Porã

== Bibliography ==
- Gott, Richard (1993). Land without Evil. London: Verso. ISBN 0860913988.
- Henning, John (1978). Red Gold. Cambridge, MA: Harvard University Press. ISBN 0674751078.
