= Federal University of Grande Dourados =

University in Mato Grosso do Sul, Brazil

- Universidade Federal da Grande Dourados
- Other name: UFGD
- Established: August 1, 2005
- Budget: R$ 170.140.265,13 (2014)
- Rector: Liane Maria Calarge
- Students: 8,000
- Location: Dourados, Mato Grosso do Sul, Brazil
- Campus: Dourados (Campus I & II)
- Language: Portuguese
- Website: http://www.ufgd.edu.br

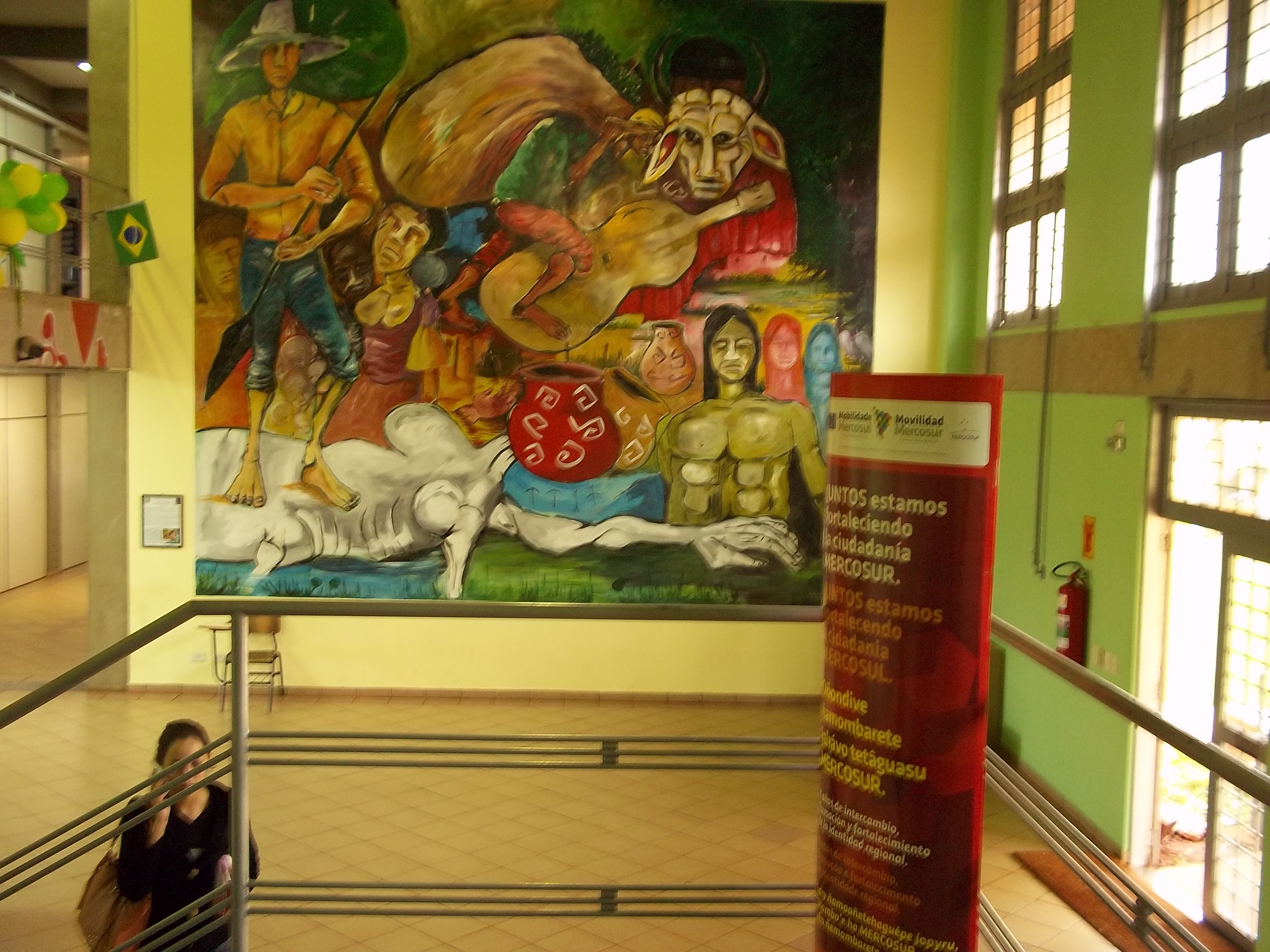
Painel FCH

The Federal University of Grande Dourados (Portuguese: Universidade Federal da Grande Dourados, UFGD) is a Brazilian public institution which is located in the city of Dourados, state of Mato Grosso do Sul, Brazil.

== See also ==
- List of federal universities of Brazil
