= List of airports by ICAO code: SN-SP =

List of airports by ICAO code: A - B - C - D - EB-EG - EH-EY - FA-FM - FN-FZ - G - H - ~~I~~ - J - KA-KH - KI-KP - KR-KZ - LA-LJ - LK-LZ - M - N - O - P - Q - R - SA-SC - SD-SH - SI - SJ - SK-SM - SN-SP - SQ - SS-SU - SV-SY - T - U - V - W - ~~X~~ - YA-YG - YH-YQ - YR-YZ - Z

== SN - Brazil ==
Also see airport category and list.

ICAO	IATA	Airport name	Community	Coordinates	Notes
SNAA		Harmony Heliport	Balneário Camboriú, Santa Catarina	26°59′14″S 048°37′58″W	
SNAB	JAW	Comte. Mairson C. Bezerra Airport	Araripina, Pernambuco	07°35′11″S 040°32′07″W	
SNAC		Santa Rosa Farm Aerodrome	Xinguara, Pará	07°02′02″S 050°05′29″W	
SNAD		Águia Branca Farm Aerodrome	Centro Novo do Maranhão, Maranhão	03°19′36″S 046°46′36″W	
SNAE		Arcoverde Airport	Arcoverde, Pernambuco	08°24′28″S 037°05′18″W	
SNAF		Aparecida Farm Aerodrome	Penápolis, São Paulo	21°29′53″S 050°06′04″W	
SNAG		Araguari Airport	Araguari, Minas Gerais	18°40′05″S 048°11′25″W	
SNAH		Piloto Padrão Farm Aerodrome	Duque de Caxias, Rio de Janeiro	22°38′31″S 043°22′25″W	
SNAI		Nossa Senhora das Graças Farm Aerodrome	Jateí, Mato Grosso do Sul	22°44′27″S 053°48′13″W	
SNAJ		Jaguaré Farm Aerodrome	Paragominas, Pará	03°25′11″S 048°19′50″W	
SNAK		Carajás Heliport	Parauapebas, Pará	06°04′39″S 050°04′27″W	
SNAL		Arapiraca Airport	Arapiraca, Alagoas	09°46′35″S 036°37′50″W	
SNAM		Santo Antônio do Amparo Airport	Santo Antônio do Amparo, Minas Gerais	20°54′49″S 044°53′34″W	
SNAN		Empresa Agrícola Chiapeta Aerodrome	Chiapetta, Rio Grande do Sul	28°03′59″S 053°52′40″W	
SNAO		Trimonte Aerodrome	Casimiro de Abreu, Rio de Janeiro	22°30′45″S 042°03′04″W	
SNAP		Janaúba Airport	Janaúba, Minas Gerais	15°43′55″S 043°19′23″W	
SNAQ		Elisa Heliport	Jarinu, São Paulo	23°09′17″S 046°46′49″W	
SNAR	AMJ	Cirilo Queiróz Airport	Almenara, Minas Gerais	16°09′57″S 040°41′03″W	
SNAS		Três Marias Airport	Três Marias, Minas Gerais	18°13′30″S 045°11′26″W	
SNAT		Nuclep Heliport	Itaguaí, Rio de Janeiro	22°53′00″S 043°49′35″W	
SNAU		Aracaju Aeroclub Airport	Aracaju, Sergipe	10°54′12″S 037°04′59″W	Closed
SNAV		Agrovale Aerodrome	Juazeiro, Bahia	09°30′15″S 040°22′10″W	
SNAW		SENAI/SESI/CNI Heliport	Brasília, Federal District	15°47′26″S 047°52′46″W	
SNAX	AIF	Assis Airport	Assis, São Paulo	22°38′19″S 050°27′21″W	
SNAY		São João Farm Aerodrome	Pontes e Lacerda, Mato Grosso	15°14′51″S 059°21′09″W	
SNAZ		Amazônia Heliport	Barueri, São Paulo	23°29′34″S 046°50′59″W	
SNBA	BAT	Chafei Amsei Airport	Barretos, São Paulo	20°35′08″S 048°35′45″W	Formerly SBBT
SNBB		BMR Medical Heliport	Campina Grande do Sul, Paraná	25°20′49″S 049°03′26″W	
SNBC		Barra do Corda Airport	Barra do Corda, Maranhão	05°30′09″S 045°12′58″W	
SNBD		Sobradinho Airport	Juazeiro, Bahia	09°27′43″S 040°49′28″W	
SNBE		Bela Vista Farm Aerodrome	Novo Horizonte do Sul, Mato Grosso do Sul	22°37′02″S 053°34′51″W	
SNBF		Vale Verde Farm Aerodrome	Canarana, Mato Grosso	13°21′22″S 052°44′59″W	
SNBG		Baixo Guandu-Aimorés Airport	Baixo Guandu, Espírito Santo	19°29′56″S 041°02′31″W	
SNBH		Biocor Heliport	Nova Lima, Minas Gerais	19°58′53″S 043°56′40″W	
SNBI		Bacabal Airport	Bacabal, Maranhão	04°13′41″S 044°49′11″W	
SNBJ		Belo Jardim Airport	Belo Jardim, Pernambuco	08°20′42″S 036°26′28″W	
SNBK		NSA Heliport	Campos do Jordão, São Paulo	22°44′18″S 045°32′24″W	
SNBL		Camargos Farm Aerodrome	Unaí, Minas Gerais	16°33′00″S 046°46′12″W	
SNBM		Cristiano Ferreira Varella Airport	Muriaé, Minas Gerais	21°07′34″S 042°23′40″W	
SNBN		Balbinot Aerodrome	Portel, Pará	02°52′33″S 050°29′30″W	
SNBO		Botelho Belchior Heliport	Aratuba, Ceará	04°22′43″S 039°02′03″W	
SNBP		Praia da Costa Heliport	Vila Velha, Espírito Santo	20°20′36″S 040°17′23″W	
SNBQ		Bela Cintra Heliport	São Paulo, São Paulo	23°33′14″S 046°39′31″W	
SNBR	BRA	Barreiras Airport	Barreiras, Bahia	12°04′45″S 045°00′34″W	
SNBS	BSS	Balsas Airport	Balsas, Maranhão	07°31′31″S 046°03′12″W	
SNBT		Benedito Leite Airport	Benedito Leite, Maranhão	07°13′01″S 044°33′02″W	Closed
SNBU		Alegria Farm Heliport	Funilândia, Minas Gerais	19°21′34″S 044°03′24″W	
SNBV		Bela Vista Heliport	Santa Cruz do Capibaribe, Pernambuco	07°56′54″S 036°13′09″W	
SNBW		Santa Luzia Farm Aerodrome	Sapezal, Mato Grosso	13°43′54″S 058°53′21″W	
SNBX	BQQ	Barra Airport	Barra, Bahia	11°04′52″S 043°08′51″W	
SNBY		Torre Boulevard Heliport	Belo Horizonte, Minas Gerais	19°55′13″S 043°55′15″W	
SNBZ		Paramirim Airport	Paramirim, Bahia	13°29′26″S 042°13′45″W	
SNCA		Campo Belo Airport	Campo Belo, Minas Gerais	20°53′33″S 045°20′08″W	
SNCB		Castanhal Aerodrome	Prainha, Pará	02°31′25″S 053°56′23″W	
SNCC		Centrino Farm Aerodrome	Cabixi, Rondônia	13°34′34″S 060°48′10″W	
SNCD		Catuama Heliport	Goiana, Pernambuco	07°39′48″S 034°50′17″W	
SNCE		Campo do Meio Airport	Campo do Meio, Minas Gerais	21°06′22″S 045°48′17″W	
SNCF		Colonial Farm Aerodrome	Verdelândia, Minas Gerais	15°27′02″S 043°24′09″W	
SNCG		Cedro Farm Aerodrome	Campo Grande, Mato Grosso do Sul	20°45′43″S 054°26′52″W	
SNCH		Unidade de Tratamento de Gás Caraguatatuba Heliport	Caraguatatuba, São Paulo	23°39′27″S 045°29′53″W	
SNCI		Cibrasa Aerodrome	Capanema, Pará	01°13′50″S 047°12′02″W	
SNCJ		Piquiatuba Aerodrome	Santarém, Pará	02°32′38″S 054°42′38″W	
SNCK		Porto Cajueiro Aerodrome	Januária, Minas Gerais	14°53′04″S 045°20′20″W	
SNCL	MXQ	Morro de São Paulo Airport	Morro de São Paulo / Cairu, Bahia	13°23′22″S 038°54′36″W	
SNCM		Camparino Farm Aerodrome	Cáceres, Mato Grosso	16°14′18″S 058°23′12″W	
SNCN		Parque Cidade Heliport	Brasília, Federal District	15°47′44″S 047°53′37″W	
SNCO		Agropecuária Santa Paola Aerodrome	Tacuru, Mato Grosso do Sul	23°31′01″S 055°03′47″W	
SNCP	EEA	Planalto Serrano Regional Airport	Correia Pinto / Lages, Santa Catarina	27°38′03″S 050°21′30″W	
SNCQ		Dal Molin Aerodrome	Santa Izabel do Oeste, Paraná	25°47′18″S 053°30′02″W	
SNCR		Viganó I Heliport	Belo Horizonte, Minas Gerais	19°57′47″S 043°57′20″W	Closed
SNCS		Campos Sales Airport	Campos Sales, Ceará	07°03′06″S 040°21′30″W	
SNCT		Ubaporanga Airport	Caratinga / Ubaporanga, Minas Gerais	19°43′31″S 042°06′44″W	
SNCU		Punaú Eco Brasil Heliport	Rio do Fogo, Rio Grande do Norte	05°21′14″S 035°21′33″W	
SNCV		Campina Verde Airport	Campina Verde, Minas Gerais	19°33′04″S 049°29′54″W	
SNCW		Alcântara Launch Centre	Alcântara, Maranhão	02°22′18″S 044°23′27″W	
SNCX		Colatina Airport	Colatina, Espírito Santo	19°29′15″S 040°34′46″W	
SNCY		Campo da Praia Aerodrome	Coruripe, Alagoas	10°13′22″S 036°17′07″W	
SNCZ		Ponte Nova Airport	Ponte Nova, Minas Gerais	20°24′11″S 042°55′00″W	
SNDA		Vale Formoso Farm Aerodrome	Figueirópolis d'Oeste, Mato Grosso	15°22′55″S 058°38′59″W	
SNDB		Palácio dos Leilões Heliport	Juatuba, Minas Gerais	19°55′36″S 044°23′17″W	
SNDC	RDC	Redenção Airport	Redenção, Pará	08°01′52″S 049°58′47″W	
SNDD		Condomínio Aeronáutico Santos Dumont Aerodrome	Elias Fausto, São Paulo	23°03′56″S 047°19′29″W	
SNDE		National Development Bank Heliport	Rio de Janeiro, Rio de Janeiro	22°54′31″S 043°10′48″W	
SNDF		Fecularia Lopes Aerodrome	Itaúna do Sul, Paraná	22°46′00″S 052°52′37″W	
SNDG		Aldeia Aerodrome	Borba, Amazonas	06°28′00″S 059°47′25″W	
SNDH		ABA Aerodrome	Barreiras, Bahia	12°09′46″S 045°02′01″W	
SNDI		Dois Irmãos Farm Aerodrome	Naviraí, Mato Grosso do Sul	22°47′32″S 054°10′46″W	
SNDJ		Sucunduri Inn Aerodrome	Borba, Amazonas	05°31′04″S 059°32′33″W	
SNDK		CTO Itaú Heliport	São Paulo, São Paulo	23°33′28″S 046°36′56″W	
SNDL		Luciano Cavalcante Heliport	Paraipaba, Ceará	03°20′45″S 039°07′34″W	
SNDM		Karina Heliport	Guarulhos, São Paulo	23°26′24″S 046°26′05″W	
SNDN		Cemaden–CIGE Heliport	Salvador, Bahia	12°56′38″S 038°25′32″W	
SNDO		Lagoa Redonda Heliport	Fortaleza, Ceará	03°49′05″S 038°27′38″W	
SNDP		Derso Portilho Vieira Aerodrome	São Félix do Araguaia, Mato Grosso	11°25′31″S 052°13′08″W	
SNDQ		Soya Farm Aerodrome	São Desidério, Bahia	12°55′16″S 045°34′10″W	
SNDR		Domingos Rego Aerodrome	Timon, Maranhão	05°04′51″S 042°52′25″W	
SNDS		São Martinho Farm Aerodrome	Ilha Solteira, São Paulo	20°21′26″S 051°15′20″W	
SNDT	DTI	Diamantina Airport	Diamantina, Minas Gerais	18°13′56″S 043°39′01″W	
SNDU		Ponta do Sol Aerodrome	Capitólio, Minas Gerais	20°38′20″S 045°59′55″W	
SNDV	DIQ	Brigadeiro Cabral Airport	Divinópolis, Minas Gerais	20°10′55″S 044°52′12″W	
SNDW		Divisa Aerodrome	Encruzilhada, Bahia	15°31′11″S 040°52′22″W	
SNDX		Cachoeira Aerodrome	Coruripe, Alagoas	10°02′26″S 036°19′33″W	
SNDZ		NX Gold Aerodrome	Nova Xavantina, Mato Grosso	14°38′34″S 052°29′58″W	
SNEA		Primavera Estate	Alegrete, Rio Grande do Sul	30°03′29″S 055°26′08″W	
SNEB	JPE	Paragominas Airport	Paragominas, Pará	03°01′11″S 047°18′59″W	
SNEC		Outeiro das Brisas Airport	Porto Seguro, Bahia	16°42′45″S 039°08′33″W	
SNED		Sócrates Rezende Airport	Canavieiras, Bahia	15°39′59″S 038°57′19″W	
SNEE		Vacaria Airport	Vacaria, Rio Grande do Sul	28°25′55″S 051°01′22″W	
SNEF		Praia de Santa Rita Heliport	Paraty, Rio de Janeiro	23°11′30″S 044°38′45″W	
SNEG		Netolândia Farm Aerodrome	Tangará da Serra, Mato Grosso	14°39′04″S 057°53′17″W	
SNEH		Samaritan Hospital Heliport	Rio de Janeiro, Rio de Janeiro	22°59′33″S 043°22′16″W	
SNEI		São Miguel Farm Aerodrome	Rio Pardo, Rio Grande do Sul	30°10′43″S 052°10′20″W	
SNEJ		Monte Verde Aerodrome	Camanducaia, Minas Gerais	22°51′35″S 046°02′15″W	
SNEK		Acalanto Farm Aerodrome	São Desidério, Bahia	12°57′30″S 045°58′18″W	
SNEL		Joá Farm Aerodrome	Caarapó, Mato Grosso do Sul	22°33′40″S 054°57′50″W	
SNEM		Enseada Heliport	Salvador, Bahia	12°47′44″S 038°38′37″W	
SNEN		Calubra Farm Aerodrome	Passagem Franca do Piauí, Piauí	05°58′21″S 042°24′27″W	
SNEO		Sequóia Building Heliport	Ribeirão Preto, São Paulo	21°13′08″S 047°48′16″W	
SNEP		Infinity Heliport	Araranguá, Santa Catarina	28°56′07″S 049°28′56″W	
SNEQ		Ouro Negro Heliport	Rio de Janeiro, Rio de Janeiro	22°54′47″S 043°13′23″W	
SNER		RB Institute Heliport	Recife, Pernambuco	08°03′44″S 034°57′50″W	
SNES		Esplanada Airport	Esplanada, Bahia	11°46′22″S 037°57′03″W	
SNET		Estrela Farm Aerodrome	Sidrolândia, Mato Grosso do Sul	21°16′26″S 055°12′58″W	
SNEU		Euclides da Cunha Airport	Euclides da Cunha, Bahia	10°31′38″S 039°01′58″W	
SNEV		Vargas Heliport	Brusque, Santa Catarina	27°08′56″S 048°57′25″W	
SNEW		Congonhas Farm Aerodrome	Carneirinho, Minas Gerais	19°39′45″S 050°57′03″W	
SNEX		Luxor Building Heliport	Sorocaba, São Paulo	23°31′10″S 047°27′48″W	
SNEY		Aguapey Farm Aerodrome	Porto Esperidião, Mato Grosso	15°45′45″S 058°48′15″W	
SNEZ		Palmeira do Capim Farm Aerodrome	Novo Brasil, Goiás	15°57′39″S 050°42′56″W	
SNFA		Santo Antônio Farm Aerodrome	Unaí, Minas Gerais	16°42′58″S 046°31′16″W	
SNFB		Cachoeira do Bambuzal Farm Aerodrome	Itaguari, Goiás	15°55′52″S 049°40′42″W	
SNFC		Marina do Caraipé Aerodrome	Tucuruí, Piauí	03°51′35″S 049°40′58″W	
SNFD		Porto Frade Heliport	Angra dos Reis, Rio de Janeiro	22°58′12″S 044°26′40″W	
SNFE		Alfenas Airport	Alfenas, Minas Gerais	21°25′53″S 045°55′56″W	
SNFF		Feijó Aerodrome	Fortaleza, Ceará	03°48′34″S 038°37′01″W	
SNFG		Fogoió Aerodrome	Itaituba, Pará	05°21′32″S 057°31′13″W	
SNFH		Usina César Filho Aerodrome	Chupinguaia, Rondônia	12°15′44″S 061°10′37″W	
SNFI		São José do Paranaíba Farm Aerodrome	Tupaciguara, Minas Gerais	18°23′15″S 048°51′42″W	
SNFJ		Thaimaçu Inn Aerodrome	Jacareacanga, Pará	09°03′31″S 056°35′31″W	
SNFK		Colorado Estate Heliport	Sales Oliveira, São Paulo	20°45′31″S 047°51′48″W	
SNFL		Fly Lagos Aerodrome	Cabo Frio, Rio de Janeiro	22°43′09″S 042°03′10″W	
SNFM		Mourão Farm Aerodrome	Colniza, Mato Grosso	08°59′11″S 061°27′29″W	
SNFN		Santa Fé Farm Aerodrome	Jardinópolis, São Paulo	20°56′15″S 047°52′05″W	
SNFO		Formiga Airport	Formiga, Minas Gerais	20°23′41″S 045°28′59″W	
SNFP		Pirapó Farm Aerodrome	Sorriso, Mato Grosso	12°12′41″S 055°51′25″W	
SNFQ		Bandeirantes Farm Aerodrome	Nova Marilândia, Mato Grosso	14°20′54″S 056°56′59″W	
SNFR		Presidente Roosevelt Aerodrome	Novo Aripuanã, Amazonas	07°50′50″S 060°58′21″W	
SNFS		Barcelona V Farm Aerodrome	Formosa do Rio Preto, Bahia	11°35′59″S 046°01′43″W	
SNFT		Toca da Onça Farm Aerodrome	União do Sul, Mato Grosso	11°19′25″S 054°34′27″W	
SNFU		Frutal Airport	Frutal, Minas Gerais	20°00′17″S 048°57′32″W	
SNFV		Serra da Pintura Aerodrome	Santa Fé de Goiás, Goiás	15°34′03″S 051°12′39″W	
SNFW		Girua Farm Aerodrome	Rio Verde de Mato Grosso, Mato Grosso do Sul	18°48′11″S 054°51′07″W	
SNFX	SXX	São Félix do Xingu Airport	São Félix do Xingu, Pará	06°38′29″S 051°57′08″W	
SNFY		Fly Park Florianópolis Aerodrome	Florianópolis, Santa Catarina	27°28′12″S 048°28′16″W	
SNFZ		Villa Terezinha Farm Aerodrome	Bocaiúva, Minas Gerais	17°24′19″S 043°56′23″W	
SNGA	GUZ	Guarapari Airport	Guarapari, Espírito Santo	20°38′47″S 040°29′30″W	
SNGB		Gilbués Airport	Gilbués, Piauí	09°49′51″S 045°22′06″W	
SNGC		Galleria Corporate Heliport	Campinas, São Paulo	22°51′59″S 047°01′18″W	
SNGD	GDP	Guadalupe Airport	Guadalupe, Piauí	06°46′56″S 043°34′56″W	
SNGE		Ilha do Retiro Heliport	Recife, Pernambuco	08°04′00″S 034°54′05″W	
SNGF		Manacá Farm Heliport	Gravatá, Pernambuco	08°11′29″S 035°30′17″W	
SNGG		Bom Jesus do Gurguéia Airport	Bom Jesus, Piauí	09°03′34″S 044°22′09″W	
SNGH		Esparrame Farm Aerodrome	Figueirão, Mato Grosso do Sul	18°48′13″S 053°42′38″W	
SNGI	GNM	Guanambi Airport	Guanambi, Bahia	14°12′29″S 042°44′46″W	
SNGJ		Padre Cicero Farm Aerodrome	Marabá, Pará	05°36′20″S 049°28′30″W	
SNGK		Bela Vista Farm Aerodrome	Monte Alegre de Minas, Minas Gerais	19°02′46″S 048°58′23″W	
SNGL		Boa Vista Heliport	Porto Feliz, São Paulo	23°19′57″S 047°33′36″W	
SNGM		Epemaju Farm Aerodrome	São Félix do Xingu, Pará	05°33′36″S 050°57′55″W	
SNGN	QGP	Garanhuns Airport	Garanhuns, Pernambuco	08°50′04″S 036°28′17″W	
SNGO		Montes Claros de Goiás Aerodrome	Montes Claros de Goiás, Goiás	15°53′45″S 051°31′21″W	
SNGP		Santa Maria Farm Aerodrome	Tupaciguara, Minas Gerais	18°35′12″S 048°52′11″W	
SNGQ		Bom Despacho Aerodrome	Bom Despacho, Minas Gerais	19°41′17″S 045°16′11″W	
SNGR		Gorotire Aerodrome	Cumaru do Norte, Pará	07°47′01″S 051°08′02″W	
SNGS		Alagoas Aeroclub Aerodrome	Maceió, Alagoas	09°35′10″S 035°45′02″W	
SNGT		Gentio do Ouro Aerodrome	Gentio do Ouro, Bahia	11°26′30″S 042°31′08″W	
SNGU		Grupo Petrópolis Uberaba Heliport	Uberaba, Minas Gerais	19°50′16″S 047°53′08″W	
SNGV		Tanguro Farm Aerodrome	Querência, Mato Grosso	12°43′38″S 052°23′06″W	
SNGW		Santo Angelo Farm Aerodrome	Barra do Choça, Bahia	14°49′36″S 040°39′03″W	
SNGX		Guaxupé Airport	Guaxupé, Minas Gerais	21°19′36″S 046°43′49″W	
SNGY		Salles Aerodrome	Castanhal, Pará	01°15′32″S 047°57′12″W	
SNGZ		Bardahl Heliport	Cajamar, São Paulo	23°20′25″S 046°50′38″W	
SNHA		Comandante Endeel Gabriel Heliport	São Luís, Maranhão	02°29′06″S 044°15′04″W	
SNHB		Paracuru Base Heliport	Paracuru, Ceará	03°24′08″S 039°00′42″W	
SNHC		Caraguatatuba Regional Hospital Heliport	Caraguatatuba, São Paulo	23°39′26″S 045°26′24″W	
SNHD		Floresta do Lobo Farm Aerodrome	Uberlândia, Minas Gerais	19°04′41″S 048°07′46″W	
SNHE		Canuanã Farm Aerodrome	Formoso do Araguaia, Tocantins	11°58′39″S 049°54′29″W	
SNHF		Figaro Heliport	Brasília, Federal District	15°46′25″S 047°49′01″W	Closed
SNHG		Varjadão Farm Aerodrome	Sandolândia, Tocantins	12°20′29″S 049°37′16″W	
SNHH		Helibrás Heliport	Itajubá, Minas Gerais	22°25′48″S 045°28′51″W	
SNHI		Pólo Industrial Heliport	Guamaré, Rio Grande do Norte	05°07′37″S 036°22′53″W	
SNHJ		Usina de José Bonifácio Aerodrome	José Bonifácio, São Paulo	21°05′43″S 049°54′55″W	
SNHK		Caacupê Farm Aerodrome	Nioaque, Mato Grosso do Sul	21°17′26″S 055°49′22″W	
SNHL		Ama Heliport	Arujá, São Paulo	23°23′00″S 046°18′31″W	Closed
SNHM		Morro da Gavazza Heliport	Salvador, Bahia	13°00′30″S 038°31′51″W	
SNHN		EFAI Heliport	Contagem, Minas Gerais	19°53′27″S 044°03′19″W	
SNHO		Hotel Paradise Heliport	Catanduva, São Paulo	21°06′39″S 048°57′52″W	
SNHP		São Judas Tadeu Farm Aerodrome	Santa Rita do Pardo, Mato Grosso do Sul	21°33′40″S 052°58′30″W	
SNHQ		CRER Heliport	Goiânia, Goiás	16°39′18″S 049°14′56″W	
SNHS	SET	Santa Magalhães Airport	Serra Talhada, Pernambuco	08°03′41″S 038°19′43″W	
SNHT		Togni Heliport	Poços de Caldas, Minas Gerais	21°46′49″S 046°35′52″W	
SNHU		Bola Sete Farm Aerodrome	Itinga do Maranhão, Maranhão	04°34′09″S 047°28′16″W	
SNHV		Vaska Heliport	Guarulhos, São Paulo	23°23′20″S 046°24′34″W	
SNHW		Agro-Maratá Farm Aerodrome	Santa Luzia, Maranhão	04°19′10″S 046°13′30″W	
SNHX		Central Farm Aerodrome	Aquidauana, Mato Grosso do Sul	19°24′57″S 056°11′36″W	
SNHY		Esperança Hospital Heliport	Recife, Pernambuco	08°04′02″S 034°53′43″W	
SNHZ		Amazonas State Government Palace Heliport	Manaus, Amazonas	03°05′33″S 060°03′36″W	
SNIA		Arujá Heliport	Arujá, São Paulo	23°23′39″S 046°21′16″W	
SNIB		Itaberaba Airport	Itaberaba, Bahia	12°29′59″S 040°16′13″W	
SNIC		Irecê Airport	Irecê, Bahia	11°20′24″S 041°50′49″W	
SNID		São Paulo State Cancer Institute Heliport	São Paulo, São Paulo	23°33′22″S 046°40′06″W	
SNIE		Caetité Airport	Caetité, Bahia	14°00′44″S 042°29′38″W	
SNIF		Floresta Flying Club Aerodrome	Visconde do Rio Branco, Minas Gerais	20°59′17″S 042°53′16″W	
SNIG	QIG	Dr. Francisco Tomé da Frota Airport	Iguatu, Ceará	06°20′48″S 039°17′40″W	
SNIH		Rio Negro Farm Aerodrome	Aquidauana, Mato Grosso do Sul	19°34′11″S 056°14′38″W	
SNII		Joazeiro Farm Aerodrome	Corumbá, Mato Grosso do Sul	19°12′37″S 055°56′23″W	
SNIJ		Joca Viol Aerodrome	Birigui, São Paulo	21°16′59″S 050°24′42″W	
SNIK		Kapoto Aerodrome	Peixoto de Azevedo, Mato Grosso	09°45′48″S 053°14′54″W	
SNIL		HBR Lead Corporate Faria Lima Heliport	São Paulo, São Paulo	23°35′31″S 046°40′49″W	
SNIM		Pegoraro Joaçaba Heliport	Joaçaba, Santa Catarina	27°10′33″S 051°30′59″W	
SNIN		Nova Era Aerodrome	Pantano Grande, Rio Grande do Sul	30°12′48″S 052°26′31″W	
SNIO		Cipó Airport	Cipó, Bahia	11°07′31″S 038°29′13″W	
SNIP		Itapetinga Airport	Itapetinga, Bahia	15°14′40″S 040°16′38″W	
SNIQ		Morro do Ouro II Heliport	Paracatu, Minas Gerais	17°10′40″S 046°52′44″W	
SNIR		Mata Escura Farm Aerodrome	Parnarama, Maranhão	05°44′42″S 043°36′07″W	
SNIS		Rio Largo Farm Aerodrome	Caxias, Maranhão	05°11′49″S 043°35′52″W	
SNIT		Ibotirama Airport	Ibotirama, Bahia	12°10′06″S 043°13′21″W	
SNIU		Ipiaú Airport	Ipiaú, Bahia	14°10′24″S 039°41′03″W	
SNIV		Jumari Farm Aerodrome	Ipiaçu, Minas Gerais	18°38′47″S 049°52′57″W	
SNIW		Carmelo Farm Aerodrome	Maracaju, Mato Grosso do Sul	21°28′42″S 055°19′53″W	
SNIX		Masutti Farm Aerodrome	Campos de Júlio, Mato Grosso	13°33′12″S 059°06′01″W	
SNIY		Fartura Farm Aerodrome	Planalto da Serra, Mato Grosso	14°32′44″S 054°47′11″W	
SNIZ		Jaqueline Farm Aerodrome	Vilhena, Rondônia	12°52′57″S 060°07′10″W	
SNJA		Capivari Aerodrome	Capivari do Sul, Rio Grande do Sul	30°08′04″S 050°30′35″W	
SNJB		Jacobina Airport	Jacobina, Bahia	11°09′47″S 040°33′12″W	
SNJC		Cialne Umirim Aerodrome	Umirim, Ceará	03°41′41″S 039°24′31″W	
SNJD		Jardim Farm Aerodrome	Chapadão do Céu, Goiás	18°25′54″S 052°39′22″W	
SNJE		Fresadora Farm Aerodrome	Gonçalves Dias, Maranhão	05°02′43″S 044°02′49″W	
SNJF		Rural Verde Aerodrome	Sítio do Mato, Bahia	12°38′51″S 043°31′07″W	
SNJG		Jardim Metropolitano Heliport	Eusébio, Ceará	03°52′02″S 038°28′52″W	
SNJH		JH Sementes Aerodrome	Correntina, Bahia	13°46′08″S 046°08′40″W	
SNJI		Fortaleza de Santa Terezinha Farm Aerodrome	Jequitaí, Minas Gerais	17°11′13″S 044°38′58″W	
SNJJ		Vô Anízio Farm Aerodrome	Dois Irmãos do Buriti, Mato Grosso do Sul	20°42′33″S 055°22′23″W	
SNJK		Jequié Airport	Jequié, Bahia	13°52′40″S 040°04′17″W	
SNJL		J LEM Aerodrome	Luís Eduardo Magalhães, Bahia	12°07′30″S 045°46′20″W	
SNJM	JMA	Manhuaçu Airport	Manhuaçu, Minas Gerais	20°15′35″S 042°11′02″W	
SNJN	JNA	Januária Airport	Januária, Minas Gerais	15°28′29″S 044°23′11″W	
SNJO		João Pessoa Aeroclub Aerodrome	João Pessoa, Paraíba	07°05′31″S 034°50′30″W	
SNJP		João Pinheiro Airport	João Pinheiro, Minas Gerais	17°47′15″S 046°07′13″W	
SNJQ		Jequitinhonha Airport	Jequitinhonha, Minas Gerais	16°26′29″S 041°02′14″W	
SNJR	JDR	Pref. Octávio de Almeida Neves Airport	São João del-Rei, Minas Gerais	21°05′08″S 044°13′31″W	
SNJS		Júlio Simões–Matriz Heliport	Mogi das Cruzes, São Paulo	23°32′30″S 046°13′53″W	
SNJT		The One Office Tower Heliport	Taubaté, São Paulo	23°01′44″S 045°34′43″W	
SNJU		Municipal Cid Cley Mendes Leoncini Aerodrome	São José do Xingu, Mato Grosso	10°48′55″S 052°44′49″W	
SNJV		Santa Mônica Farm Aerodrome	São João da Ponte, Minas Gerais	15°59′54″S 043°44′18″W	
SNJW		Cabletech Heliport	Caçapava, São Paulo	23°10′40″S 045°43′34″W	
SNJX		Monte Sinai Hospital Heliport	Juiz de Fora, Minas Gerais	21°46′52″S 043°21′53″W	
SNJY		Ibiza Blumenau Heliport	Blumenau, Santa Catarina	26°54′52″S 049°05′15″W	
SNJZ		Joatinga Heliport	Rio de Janeiro, Rio de Janeiro	23°00′56″S 043°17′45″W	
SNKA		Perto d'Água Farm Aerodrome	Avaré, São Paulo	23°15′14″S 048°54′27″W	
SNKB		Campina Grande Aeroclub Aerodrome	Campina Grande, Paraíba	07°10′42″S 035°59′25″W	
SNKC		Cocos Aerodrome	Cocos, Bahia	14°10′22″S 044°32′48″W	
SNKD		Conceição do Mato Dentro Airport	Conceição do Mato Dentro, Minas Gerais	19°01′13″S 043°26′02″W	
SNKE		São Francisco Farm Aerodrome	Morada Nova de Minas, Minas Gerais	18°34′55″S 045°19′17″W	
SNKF		Das Bandeirinhas Airport	Conselheiro Lafaiete, Minas Gerais	20°44′19″S 043°47′51″W	
SNKG		Green Metals Heliport	Brumadinho, Minas Gerais	20°09′07″S 044°08′39″W	
SNKH		Creputiá Aerodrome	Jacareacanga, Pará	08°07′01″S 057°07′02″W	Closed
SNKI	CDI	Raimundo de Andrade Airport	Cachoeiro de Itapemirim, Espírito Santo	20°50′07″S 041°11′11″W	
SNKJ		Rio Dourado Farm Aerodrome	Cumaru do Norte, Pará	08°20′02″S 051°26′49″W	
SNKK		Caicó Airport	Caicó, Rio Grande do Norte	06°26′21″S 037°04′41″W	
SNKL		Leonardo da Vincí Heliport	Sorocaba, São Paulo	23°31′55″S 047°27′57″W	
SNKM		MJ Heliport	Campo Largo, Paraná	25°26′25″S 049°23′31″W	
SNKN		Currais Novos Airport	Currais Novos, Rio Grande do Norte	06°16′51″S 036°32′25″W	
SNKO		Brotas de Macaúbas Aerodrome	Brotas de Macaúbas, Bahia	11°59′57″S 042°38′08″W	
SNKP		Conquista do Pontal Aerodrome	Mirante do Paranapanema, São Paulo	22°23′02″S 052°06′29″W	
SNKQ		Quebraxo Farm Aerodrome	Porto Murtinho, Mato Grosso do Sul	21°04′57″S 057°39′22″W	
SNKR		Corrente Aerodrome	Corrente, Piauí	10°27′10″S 045°08′09″W	
SNKS		Santa Rita de Cássia Aerodrome	Santa Rita de Cássia, Bahia	10°59′21″S 044°30′55″W	
SNKT		Viçosa Farm Aerodrome	Naviraí, Mato Grosso do Sul	23°08′15″S 053°50′36″W	
SNKU		Canudos Aerodrome	Canudos, Bahia	09°54′11″S 039°01′58″W	
SNKV		Campo Verde Farm Aerodrome	Tartarugalzinho, Amapá	01°02′34″N 050°31′01″W	
SNKW		Monteflor Heliport	Guaramiranga, Ceará	04°15′26″S 038°56′34″W	
SNKY		Cikel Farm Aerodrome	Paragominas, Pará	03°39′27″S 048°49′25″W	
SNKZ		São Marcos Farm Aerodrome	Vila Bela da Santíssima Trindade, Mato Grosso	15°28′02″S 059°56′45″W	
SNLA		Lagoa das Antas Farm Aerodrome	Canaã dos Carajás, Pará	06°33′53″S 049°43′30″W	
SNLB		Magdalena Farm Aerodrome	Lábrea, Amazonas	09°12′11″S 065°42′31″W	
SNLC		Panambi Farm Aerodrome	Buritis, Minas Gerais	15°49′35″S 046°27′56″W	
SNLD		São Luiz do Matão Farm Aerodrome	Carneirinho, Minas Gerais	19°52′12″S 050°39′10″W	
SNLE		Mil Estate Aerodrome	Miranda, Mato Grosso do Sul	20°11′59″S 057°06′04″W	
SNLF		Três Flechas Farm Aerodrome	Vila Rica, Mato Grosso	10°04′54″S 051°53′19″W	
SNLG		Serra do Cipó Aerodrome	Jaboticatubas, Minas Gerais	19°23′55″S 043°44′47″W	
SNLH		Ilha do Almeida Heliport	Angra dos Reis, Rio de Janeiro	23°02′17″S 044°20′31″W	
SNLI		Abaeté Airport	Abaeté, Minas Gerais	19°09′21″S 045°29′42″W	
SNLJ		Campo Aliancinha Farm Aerodrome	Corumbá, Mato Grosso do Sul	18°36′18″S 056°12′54″W	
SNLK		Skydive Litoral Aerodrome	Saquarema, Rio de Janeiro	22°51′00″S 042°33′21″W	
SNLL		Liberty Condominium Aerodrome	Goianápolis, Goiás	16°26′59″S 049°00′43″W	
SNLM		Pirá-Açu Inn Aerodrome	Apuí, Amazonas	07°46′14″S 060°22′40″W	
SNLN	LHN	Linhares Regional Airport	Linhares, Espírito Santo	19°21′19″S 040°04′17″W	
SNLO	SSO	Comte. Luiz Carlos de Oliveira Airport	São Lourenço, Minas Gerais	22°05′27″S 045°02′40″W	
SNLP		Acapulco Guarujá Heliport	Guarujá, São Paulo	23°57′16″S 046°12′07″W	
SNLQ		Conforto Farm Aerodrome	Nova Crixás, Goiás	14°03′57″S 050°24′57″W	
SNLR		Itautec Heliport	São Paulo, São Paulo	23°31′53″S 046°34′20″W	
SNLS		Luciano Peixoto Heliport	Pirenópolis, Goiás	15°55′50″S 048°55′32″W	
SNLT		Paulistana Aerodrome	Paulistana, Piauí	08°09′33″S 041°09′02″W	
SNLU		Santa Luzia d'Oeste Tradição Heliport	Santa Luzia d'Oeste, Rondônia	11°54′17″S 061°47′34″W	
SNLV		Maria Magalhães Aerodrome	Porto União, Santa Catarina	26°15′04″S 051°00′45″W	
SNLW		Reunidas Baumgart IV Farm Aerodrome	Paraúna, Goiás	16°52′14″S 050°57′35″W	
SNLX		Laguna Condominium Heliport	Marechal Deodoro, Alagoas	09°42′11″S 035°48′03″W	
SNLY		Lagoa da Prata Aerodrome	Lagoa da Prata, Minas Gerais	20°03′56″S 045°33′23″W	
SNLZ		Boca da Mata Farm Aerodrome	Divinópolis do Tocantins, Tocantins	09°25′55″S 049°35′28″W	
SNMA	MTE	Monte Alegre Airport	Monte Alegre, Pará	01°59′48″S 054°04′17″W	
SNMB		Santa Maria Farm Aerodrome	Corumbá, Mato Grosso do Sul	19°25′08″S 056°39′59″W	
SNMC		Macaúbas Airport	Macaúbas, Bahia	13°01′30″S 042°40′20″W	Closed
SNMD		Mundico Coelho Aerodrome	Itaituba, Pará	06°50′13″S 056°50′39″W	
SNME		Costa dos Coqueiros Aerodrome	Mata de São João, Bahia	12°29′23″S 038°01′25″W	
SNMF		Agropastoril Monte Alegre Aerodrome	Monte Belo, Minas Gerais	21°21′02″S 046°15′02″W	
SNMG		Miguel Dias I Heliport	Fortaleza, Ceará	03°45′59″S 038°29′10″W	
SNMH		Pirenópolis Airport	Pirenópolis, Goiás	15°50′55″S 048°58′58″W	
SNMI		Mina Caraíba Aerodrome	Jaguarari, Bahia	09°49′48″S 039°53′12″W	
SNMJ		Maracás Airport	Maracás, Bahia	13°23′10″S 040°27′58″W	
SNMK		Mocambinho Airport	Jaíba, Minas Gerais	15°05′35″S 043°58′45″W	
SNML		Manduca Leão Aerodrome	Rio Largo, Alagoas	09°32′39″S 035°49′29″W	
SNMN		Caraíbas Farm Aerodrome	Ipirá, Bahia	12°17′02″S 040°05′29″W	
SNMN		Minas Novas Airport	Minas Novas, Minas Gerais	17°15′50″S 042°32′21″W	
SNMO		Sítio Baronesa Heliport	Campos do Jordão, São Paulo	22°43′09″S 045°36′57″W	
SNMP		Alvorada Moema Hospital Heliport	São Paulo, São Paulo	23°36′04″S 046°39′40″W	
SNMQ		Tigre Heliport	Joinville, Santa Catarina	26°19′01″S 048°51′58″W	
SNMR		Maraú Airport	Maraú, Bahia	14°08′36″S 039°00′24″W	
SNMS		Acácio Favacho Aerodrome	Pracuúba, Amapá	01°33′39″N 050°46′15″W	
SNMT		Profitus Heliport	Ilhabela, São Paulo	23°55′00″S 045°27′19″W	
SNMU	MVS	Mucuri Airport	Mucuri, Bahia	18°02′58″S 039°51′48″W	
SNMV		Flávia Farm Aerodrome	Alcinópolis, Mato Grosso do Sul	18°20′50″S 053°45′06″W	
SNMW		Parceiro Farm Aerodrome	Corrente, Piauí	10°33′31″S 045°26′45″W	
SNMX		São Mateus Airport	São Mateus, Espírito Santo	18°43′17″S 039°50′01″W	
SNMY		Medic Life Heliport	Barueri, São Paulo	23°29′06″S 046°51′25″W	
SNMZ	PTQ	Porto de Moz Airport	Porto de Moz, Pará	01°44′29″S 052°14′09″W	
SNNA		Paiva Air Heliport	Mairinque, São Paulo	23°33′33″S 047°11′59″W	
SNNB		Cana Brava Farm Aerodrome	Paracatu, Minas Gerais	17°10′26″S 046°18′00″W	
SNNC		Namocoli Farm Aerodrome	Corumbá, Minas Gerais	20°36′32″S 057°33′15″W	
SNND		Piraquê II Heliport	Queimados, Rio de Janeiro	22°44′31″S 043°37′19″W	
SNNE		Sebastião Carlos Leite Airport	São João Nepomuceno, Minas Gerais	21°32′32″S 043°01′16″W	
SNNF		Our Lady of Fatima Farm Aerodrome	Jaraguari, Mato Grosso do Sul	20°09′17″S 054°38′57″W	
SNNG		Mário Spada Aerodrome	Minas Novas, Minas Gerais	17°31′19″S 042°23′18″W	
SNNH		Haskell Heliport	Viçosa, Minas Gerais	20°45′53″S 042°49′55″W	
SNNI		Horto da Paz Heliport	Itapecerica da Serra, São Paulo	23°43′42″S 046°53′09″W	
SNNJ		Cananéia Heliport	Cananéia, São Paulo	25°00′28″S 047°55′30″W	
SNNK		Santa Bernadette da Volta Grande Farm Aerodrome	Campo Grande, Mato Grosso do Sul	21°17′18″S 053°53′01″W	
SNNL		Locks Farm Aerodrome	Nova Maringá, Mato Grosso	12°48′33″S 057°07′36″W	
SNNM		Entre Rios Aerodrome	Guarapuava, Paraná	25°34′06″S 051°29′43″W	
SNNN		Buriti II Farm Aerodrome	Arinos, Minas Gerais	15°59′23″S 045°59′51″W	
SNNO		São Domingos Farm Aerodrome	Comodoro, Mato Grosso	14°03′32″S 059°51′03″W	
SNNP		Nilo Peçanha Airport	Nilo Peçanha, Pará	08°04′01″S 052°10′02″W	Closed
SNNQ		Mina de Ouro Farm Aerodrome	Paranatinga, Mato Grosso	14°07′53″S 054°14′00″W	
SNNR		Nossa Senhora Medianeira Farm Aerodrome	Naviraí, Mato Grosso do Sul	22°54′59″S 053°58′24″W	
SNNS		VLI Tiplam Heliport	Santos, São Paulo	23°52′15″S 046°21′57″W	
SNNT		Lagoa do Cavalo Heliport	Gravatá, Pernambuco	08°10′23″S 035°38′18″W	
SNNU		Nanuque Airport	Nanuque, Minas Gerais	17°49′23″S 040°19′47″W	
SNNV		Vila Nova Aerodrome	Joinville, Santa Catarina	26°18′23″S 048°56′05″W	
SNNW		Regalito Farm Aerodrome	Flores de Goiás, Goiás	14°27′58″S 046°52′14″W	
SNNX		Umbú Stud Farm Aerodrome	Barra do Quaraí, Rio Grande do Sul	29°58′50″S 057°16′16″W	
SNNY		Tapyratynga Farm Aerodrome	Pimenteiras do Oeste, Rondônia	12°42′56″S 061°28′28″W	
SNNZ		Zone 01 Heliport	Itapema, Santa Catarina	27°08′32″S 048°35′31″W	
SNOB	QBX	Sobral Airport	Sobral, Ceará	03°40′44″S 040°20′12″W	
SNOC		Morro do Chapéu Airport	Morro do Chapéu, Bahia	11°32′04″S 041°10′47″W	
SNOD		Mucugê Village Resort Hotel Heliport	Porto Seguro, Bahia	16°30′00″S 039°04′19″W	
SNOE		Oeiras Airport	Oeiras, Piauí	07°01′06″S 042°10′02″W	
SNOF		Ouro Fino Airport	Ouro Fino, Minas Gerais	22°17′50″S 046°23′33″W	
SNOG		Ceará-Mirim Aerodrome	Ceará-Mirim, Rio Grande do Norte	05°39′41″S 035°24′49″W	
SNOH		Tundavala Farm Aerodrome	Barra do Garças, Mato Grosso	14°51′26″S 052°02′10″W	
SNOI		Irmãos Martins Estate Aerodrome	Tupã, São Paulo	22°00′18″S 050°29′21″W	
SNOJ		Paz Farm Aerodrome	Formosa do Rio Preto, Bahia	10°35′30″S 045°44′40″W	
SNOK		Chão de Estrelas Farm Aerodrome	Aurora do Pará, Pará	02°19′57″S 047°39′22″W	
SNOL		Agropecuária Mariana Aerodrome	Alta Floresta, Mato Grosso	09°58′11″S 056°13′01″W	
SNOM		Guaporeí Farm Aerodrome	Vila Bela da Santíssima Trindade, Mato Grosso	15°00′24″S 060°13′15″W	
SNON		André Textor Aerodrome	Montividiu, Goiás	17°26′42″S 051°08′24″W	
SNOO		The One Building Heliport	Belo Horizonte, Minas Gerais	19°56′46″S 043°57′25″W	
SNOP		Vale da Providência Aerodrome	Rondolândia, Mato Grosso	10°33′35″S 061°25′54″W	
SNOQ		Agropecuária Crioulo Farm Aerodrome	Tacuru, Mato Grosso do Sul	23°35′56″S 055°08′33″W	
SNOR		Recanto Farm Aerodrome	Sidrolândia, Mato Grosso do Sul	21°03′52″S 055°01′40″W	
SNOS		José Figueiredo Municipal Airport	Passos, Minas Gerais	20°43′55″S 046°39′43″W	
SNOT		Usina Vale do Tijuco Aerodrome	Uberaba, Minas Gerais	19°23′05″S 048°16′27″W	
SNOU	FEJ	Feijó Airport	Feijó, Acre	08°08′29″S 070°20′27″W	
SNOV		Camaçari Settlement Aerodrome	Coruripe, Alagoas	10°07′20″S 036°17′30″W	
SNOW		Turmalina Farm Aerodrome	Rancharia, São Paulo	21°58′56″S 050°58′20″W	
SNOX	ORX	Oriximiná Airport	Oriximiná, Pará	01°42′49″S 055°50′09″W	
SNOY		Ouricuri Airport	Ouricuri, Pernambuco	07°52′35″S 040°05′30″W	
SNOZ		Coronel Alexandre Raposo Aerodrome	Paço do Lumiar, Maranhão	02°31′25″S 044°07′27″W	
SNPA		Pará de Minas Airport	Pará de Minas, Minas Gerais	19°50′33″S 044°36′03″W	
SNPB		Bravíssima Private Residence Heliport	Itajaí, Santa Catarina	26°56′03″S 048°37′59″W	
SNPC	PCS	Sen. Helvídio Nunes Airport	Picos, Piauí	07°03′41″S 041°31′33″W	
SNPD	POJ	Pedro Pereira dos Santos Airport	Patos de Minas, Minas Gerais	18°40′20″S 046°29′29″W	
SNPE		Engenho d'Água Heliport	Ilhabela, São Paulo	23°47′32″S 045°21′32″W	
SNPF		Retiro da Matão Farm Aerodrome	Porangatu, Goiás	13°29′11″S 049°01′50″W	
SNPG		Uval Farm Aerodrome	Corumbá, Mato Grosso do Sul	17°18′05″S 056°29′53″W	
SNPH		Rei da Pamonha Heliport	São Paulo, São Paulo	23°26′42″S 046°45′25″W	
SNPI		Piatã Aerodrome	Piatã, Bahia	13°09′56″S 041°46′19″W	
SNPJ		Patrocínio Airport	Patrocínio, Minas Gerais	18°54′33″S 046°58′58″W	
SNPK		WF Heliport	Pomerode, Santa Catarina	26°49′17″S 049°08′48″W	
SNPL		Pacuruxu Aerodrome	Santa Mercedes, São Paulo	21°15′23″S 051°43′44″W	
SNPM		Schõn Heliport	Pitanga, Paraná	24°45′16″S 051°45′40″W	
SNPN		Água Fria Farm Aerodrome	Lavínia, São Paulo	21°01′49″S 050°55′33″W	
SNPO		Tenente Xavier Airport	Pompéu, Minas Gerais	19°12′12″S 045°01′24″W	
SNPP		Ribeira Heliport	Ubatuba, São Paulo	23°30′12″S 045°07′33″W	
SNPQ		Pesqueira Airport	Pesqueira, Pernambuco	08°22′29″S 036°38′16″W	
SNPR		Gilson Machado Heliport	Gravatá, Pernambuco	08°11′27″S 035°36′56″W	
SNPS		Seriema Farm Aerodrome	Nova Andradina, Mato Grosso do Sul	22°03′13″S 053°20′21″W	
SNPT		Paraíso Farm Aerodrome	Conceição das Alagoas, Minas Gerais	20°05′16″S 048°29′31″W	
SNPU		Paraguaçu Airport	Paraguaçu, Minas Gerais	21°33′41″S 045°45′17″W	
SNPV		Solidão Aerodrome	Mostardas, Rio Grande do Sul	30°41′31″S 050°33′24″W	
SNPW		Palmeira Farm Aerodrome	Alto Taquari, Mato Grosso	17°55′32″S 053°13′15″W	
SNPX		Pirapora Airport	Pirapora, Minas Gerais	17°18′50″S 044°51′31″W	
SNPY		São Sebastião do Paraíso Airport	São Sebastião do Paraíso, Minas Gerais	20°56′54″S 046°58′59″W	
SNPZ		Comandante Almir Mendes de Oliveira Airport	Pedra Azul, Minas Gerais	16°04′02″S 041°10′02″W	
SNQA		Lojas Guaibim Heliport	Valença, Bahia	13°21′48″S 039°03′44″W	
SNQB		Fermap Aerodrome	Sorriso, Mato Grosso	12°33′32″S 055°37′56″W	
SNQC		IGESP Heliport	São Paulo, São Paulo	23°33′40″S 046°39′03″W	
SNQD		Sousa Airport	Sousa, Paraíba	06°47′08″S 038°14′02″W	
SNQE		Serra Grande Farm Aerodrome	Parauapebas, Pará	06°04′08″S 049°50′24″W	
SNQF		Paraíso Farm Aerodrome	Inocência, Mato Grosso do Sul	19°55′24″S 052°09′39″W	
SNQG		Cangapara Airport	Floriano, Piauí	06°50′46″S 043°04′41″W	
SNQH		Wheaton Heliport	São Bernardo do Campo, São Paulo	23°42′55″S 046°34′02″W	
SNQI		Camagril Agropecuária Farm Aerodrome	Diamantino, Mato Grosso	14°07′05″S 057°20′28″W	
SNQJ		Aerovilas Farm Aerodrome	Divinópolis, Minas Gerais	20°14′34″S 044°48′19″W	
SNQK		Muro Alto Beach Resort Heliport	Ipojuca, Pernambuco	08°26′14″S 034°59′00″W	
SNQL		Piraquê I Heliport	Rio de Janeiro, Rio de Janeiro	22°51′52″S 043°20′30″W	
SNQM		Formoso de Paraúna Farm Aerodrome	Paraúna, Goiás	17°08′57″S 050°35′45″W	
SNQN		Estrela Farm Aerodrome	Canarana, Mato Grosso	13°09′23″S 052°34′16″W	
SNQO		Carvalho Farm Aerodrome	Corumbá, Mato Grosso do Sul	17°34′04″S 056°28′58″W	
SNQP		São Francisco Farm Aerodrome	Magda, São Paulo	20°34′08″S 050°13′31″W	
SNQQ		Centroar Aerodrome	Flores de Goiás, Goiás	14°29′48″S 047°02′10″W	
SNQR		Bahia–Don Bosco Farm Aerodrome	Poconé, Mato Grosso	16°43′16″S 057°13′56″W	
SNQS		Nossa Senhora Auxiliadora Farm Aerodrome	Ivinhema, Mato Grosso do Sul	22°18′10″S 054°02′38″W	
SNQT		Estrela do Sul Farm Aerodrome	Umuarama, Paraná	23°47′18″S 053°28′57″W	
SNQU	CHD	Mucugê Airport	Mucugê, Bahia	13°01′54″S 041°26′40″W	
SNQV		Curvelo Airport	Curvelo, Minas Gerais	18°44′58″S 044°27′29″W	
SNQW		Cururu Aerodrome	Jacareacanga, Pará	07°33′52″S 057°44′32″W	
SNQX	QXD	Quixadá Airport	Quixadá, Ceará	04°58′44″S 038°59′16″W	
SNQY		Colina Verde Heliport	Ribeirão Preto, São Paulo	21°13′46″S 047°47′44″W	
SNQZ		Taquarussu Farm Aerodrome	Caarapó, Mato Grosso do Sul	22°32′48″S 055°00′11″W	
SNRA		Nossa Senhora da Abadia Aerodrome	Niquelândia, Goiás	14°39′20″S 048°35′11″W	
SNRB		Brasa Farm Aerodrome	Rosário do Sul, Rio Grande do Sul	30°20′42″S 055°03′06″W	
SNRC		Recanto Farm Aerodrome	Alcinópolis, Mato Grosso do Sul	18°00′24″S 054°00′49″W	
SNRD		Prado Airport	Prado, Bahia	17°17′49″S 039°16′19″W	
SNRE		Ellece Heliport	Guarulhos, São Paulo	23°28′20″S 046°25′58″W	
SNRF		Ecofabril Heliport	Jundiaí, São Paulo	23°10′32″S 046°56′18″W	
SNRG		Furnas Centrais Elétricas S/A Heliport	Rio de Janeiro, Rio de Janeiro	22°57′22″S 043°11′30″W	
SNRH		João Fonseca Aerodrome	Envira, Amazonas	07°26′36″S 070°01′11″W	
SNRI		Riviera de São Lourenço Heliport	Bertioga, São Paulo	23°47′52″S 046°03′21″W	
SNRJ	JRT	Juruti Airport	Juruti, Pará	02°11′12″S 056°05′25″W	
SNRK		Soledade Farm Aerodrome	Campo Alegre de Goiás, Goiás	17°23′00″S 047°32′11″W	
SNRL		Qyon Heliport	Americana, São Paulo	22°45′33″S 047°19′33″W	
SNRM		Remanso Airport	Remanso, Bahia	09°34′48″S 042°06′57″W	
SNRN		20 de Maio Farm Aerodrome	Getulina, São Paulo	21°48′32″S 049°58′16″W	
SNRO		Liberdade Farm Aerodrome	Querência, Mato Grosso	12°04′05″S 052°49′34″W	
SNRP		Rio Paranaíba Airport	Rio Paranaíba, Minas Gerais	19°12′45″S 046°14′26″W	
SNRQ		Porto Rico Aerodrome	Jacareacanga, Pará	06°06′20″S 057°22′26″W	
SNRR		Miguel Arraes Hospital Heliport	Paulista, Pernambuco	07°55′13″S 034°53′28″W	
SNRS		Canoeiro Farm Aerodrome	Cocalinho, Mato Grosso	13°03′08″S 050°49′57″W	
SNRT		Rio Negro Heliport	Cantagalo, Rio de Janeiro	21°54′38″S 042°16′00″W	
SNRU	CAU	Oscar Laranjeira Airport	Caruaru, Pernambuco	08°17′04″S 036°00′39″W	
SNRV		Rio Vermelho Farm Aerodrome	Sapucaia, Pará	06°52′34″S 049°27′31″W	
SNRW		Reik Morumbi Heliport	São Paulo, São Paulo	23°35′52″S 046°42′26″W	
SNRX		Riachão Airport	Riachão, Maranhão	07°20′47″S 046°37′39″W	
SNRY		Redpoint Heliport	Belo Horizonte, Minas Gerais	19°58′21″S 043°56′05″W	Closed
SNRZ		Oliveira Airport	Oliveira, Minas Gerais	20°42′52″S 044°51′55″W	
SNSA		Hilário Grandi Aerodrome	Unaí, Minas Gerais	16°32′45″S 047°10′43″W	
SNSB		Betel Heliport	Rio de Janeiro, Rio de Janeiro	22°54′54″S 043°40′08″W	
SNSC		Sacramento Airport	Sacramento, Minas Gerais	19°53′35″S 047°25′20″W	
SNSD		Direcional Engenharia Headquarters Heliport	Belo Horizonte, Minas Gerais	19°55′38″S 043°55′20″W	
SNSE		Sento Sé Airport	Sento Sé, Bahia	09°45′27″S 041°51′18″W	
SNSF		São Francisco Farm Aerodrome	Fartura, São Paulo	23°28′30″S 049°32′38″W	
SNSG		Salgueiro Airport	Salgueiro, Pernambuco	08°02′48″S 039°08′02″W	
SNSH		São José Aerodrome	Santarém, Pará	02°34′28″S 054°43′56″W	
SNSI		Santa Maria do Suaçuí Airport	Santa Maria do Suaçuí, Minas Gerais	18°11′55″S 042°27′58″W	
SNSJ		Fogliatelli Farm Aerodrome	Sapezal, Mato Grosso	13°31′47″S 058°34′24″W	
SNSK		Central Ferraz Aerodrome	Herculândia, São Paulo	21°52′08″S 050°18′32″W	
SNSL		São Luiz Farm	Luís Eduardo Magalhães, Bahia	12°25′54″S 046°15′28″W	
SNSM		Salinópolis Airport	Salinópolis, Pará	00°41′47″S 047°20′12″W	
SNSN		Henrimar Táxi Aéreo Heliport	Salvador, Bahia	12°52′12″S 038°21′57″W	
SNSO		Henrique Pimenta Aerodrome	Serro, Minas Gerais	18°36′31″S 043°25′27″W	
SNSP		Tropical Farm Aerodrome	Baixa Grande do Ribeiro, Piauí	08°42′38″S 045°01′15″W	
SNSQ		United Nations North Tower Heliport	São Paulo, São Paulo	23°36′37″S 046°41′47″W	
SNSR		Santos Reis Farm Aerodrome	Guarda-Mor, Minas Gerais	17°33′01″S 046°58′45″W	
SNSS	IAL	Salinas Airport	Salinas, Minas Gerais	16°12′30″S 042°19′19″W	
SNST		Souto Soares Airport	Souto Soares, Bahia	12°05′50″S 041°38′26″W	
SNSU		Globo Farm Aerodrome	Sapezal, Mato Grosso	12°56′53″S 058°35′14″W	
SNSV		São Domingos Farm Aerodrome	Ribas do Rio Pardo, Mato Grosso do Sul	20°44′15″S 053°17′38″W	
SNSW	SFK	Soure Airport	Soure, Pará	00°41′58″S 048°31′16″W	
SNSX		Apodi Quixeré Heliport	Quixeré, Ceará	05°02′32″S 037°46′43″W	
SNSY		São José Farm Aerodrome	Anastácio, Mato Grosso do Sul	20°56′42″S 055°29′46″W	Closed
SNSZ		Miss Silvia Morizono Heliport	São Paulo, São Paulo	23°35′32″S 046°40′52″W	
SNTA		São Miguel Farm Aerodrome	Pompeia, São Paulo	21°52′07″S 050°06′59″W	
SNTC		Campo Alto Farm Aerodrome	Prata, Minas Gerais	19°21′26″S 048°46′19″W	
SNTD		Mamoneira Farm Aerodrome	Natalândia, Minas Gerais	16°35′11″S 046°30′08″W	
SNTE		Terras II Heliport	Itu, São Paulo	23°20′34″S 047°18′22″W	
SNTF	TXF	9 de maio Airport	Teixeira de Freitas, Bahia	17°31′28″S 039°40′06″W	
SNTG		Gercino Coelho Aerodrome	Formosa do Rio Preto, Bahia	11°16′31″S 045°14′16″W	
SNTH		São Francisco Farm Heliport	Viana, Maranhão	03°12′42″S 045°02′00″W	
SNTI	OBI	Óbidos Airport	Óbidos, Pará	01°52′05″S 055°30′52″W	
SNTJ		Baltt Heliport	Balneário Camboriú, Santa Catarina	27°00′36″S 048°37′27″W	
SNTK		Bom Retiro Farm Aerodrome	Quintana, São Paulo	22°10′41″S 050°23′05″W	
SNTL		Treze Estrelas Farm Aerodrome	Araguaína, Tocantins	07°13′08″S 049°10′09″W	
SNTM		Turmalina Airport	Turmalina, Minas Gerais	17°14′02″S 042°44′02″W	Closed
SNTN		Gama Heliport	Barueri, São Paulo	23°29′05″S 046°51′21″W	
SNTO	TFL	Teófilo Otoni Airport	Teófilo Otoni, Minas Gerais	17°53′27″S 041°30′54″W	
SNTP		Agropalma Aerodrome	Tailândia, Pará	02°31′46″S 048°45′17″W	
SNTQ		Buritirama Airport	Buritirama, Bahia	10°43′18″S 043°39′13″W	
SNTR		Piritiba Aerodrome	Piritiba, Bahia	11°44′17″S 040°34′11″W	
SNTS		Brig. Firmino Ayres Airport	Patos, Paraíba	07°02′16″S 037°15′27″W	
SNTT		Teston Heliport	Cianorte, Paraná	23°39′25″S 052°32′22″W	
SNTU		Tupã Farm Aerodrome	Gaúcha do Norte, Mato Grosso	13°20′49″S 053°39′02″W	
SNTV		Timbaúba Farm Aerodrome	São Desidério, Bahia	12°31′10″S 046°09′04″W	
SNTW		PeterFrut Heliport	Venda Nova do Imigrante, Espírito Santo	20°23′59″S 041°04′58″W	
SNTX		San Antônio Farm Aerodrome	Buriticupu, Maranhão	04°30′28″S 046°16′02″W	
SNTY		Correntina Aerodrome	Correntina, Bahia	13°22′48″S 044°37′19″W	
SNTZ		Gran Palazzo Heliport	Chapecó, Santa Catarina	27°06′38″S 052°36′57″W	
SNUA		Paulista Farm Aerodrome	Santa Terezinha de Itaipu, Paraná	25°23′30″S 054°24′36″W	
SNUB		Ubá Airport	Ubá, Minas Gerais	21°07′12″S 042°53′01″W	
SNUC		Açu Airport	Açu, Rio Grande do Norte	05°35′42″S 036°57′39″W	
SNUD		Arruda Ramos Aerodrome	Porto Esperidião, Mato Grosso	15°47′20″S 059°01′26″W	
SNUE		Aero Sepé Aviação Agrícola Aerodrome	São Sepé, Rio Grande do Sul	30°11′05″S 053°38′23″W	
SNUF		Alfa Airport Posse Aerodrome	São Paulo, São Paulo	22°34′20″S 046°56′32″W	
SNUG		Eunice Farm Aerodrome	Vila Bela da Santíssima Trindade, Mato Grosso	14°57′20″S 059°37′25″W	
SNUH		Piumhi Airport	Piumhi, Minas Gerais	20°26′20″S 045°59′32″W	
SNUI	AIY	Araçuaí Airport	Araçuaí, Minas Gerais	16°51′07″S 042°02′46″W	
SNUJ		São Francisco Farm Aerodrome	Indiavaí, Mato Grosso	15°20′50″S 058°34′18″W	
SNUK		Centúria Montana Aerodrome	Formosa do Rio Preto, Bahia	11°17′18″S 046°03′39″W	
SNUL		Uberlândia Business Tower Heliport	Uberlândia, Minas Gerais	18°54′22″S 048°15′04″W	
SNUM		Córrego Fundo Farm Aerodrome	Água Boa, Mato Grosso	13°43′51″S 052°41′39″W	
SNUN		Unaí Airport	Unaí, Minas Gerais	16°21′14″S 046°55′37″W	
SNUO		Banco Central Heliport	Rio de Janeiro, Rio de Janeiro	22°54′07″S 043°10′58″W	
SNUP		Usina Porto Rico Aerodrome	Campo Alegre, Alagoas	09°48′09″S 036°13′20″W	
SNUQ		Urupá Tradição Heliport	Urupá, Rondônia	11°06′59″S 062°21′40″W	
SNUR		Iguatemi Empresarial Heliport	Fortaleza, Ceará	03°45′13″S 038°29′26″W	
SNUS		Usina Delta I Aerodrome	Delta, Minas Gerais	19°56′28″S 047°46′17″W	
SNUT		Utinga Aerodrome	Utinga, Bahia	12°06′20″S 041°04′28″W	
SNUU		Tainacan Farm Aerodrome	Nova Crixás, Goiás	14°08′06″S 050°49′25″W	
SNUV		Bela Vista Ranch Aerodrome	São José do Rio Claro, Mato Grosso	13°30′30″S 056°38′15″W	
SNUW		Morada Bela Farm Aerodrome	Morada Nova de Minas, Minas Gerais	18°25′38″S 045°21′51″W	
SNUX		Santo Antônio Farm Aerodrome	Ribas do Rio Pardo, Mato Grosso do Sul	21°24′38″S 053°18′31″W	
SNUY		Villa Santa Maria Heliport	São Bento do Sapucaí, São Paulo	22°43′22″S 045°40′54″W	
SNUZ		Usina Coruripe Aerodrome	Coruripe, Alagoas	10°05′38″S 036°11′12″W	
SNVA		Bela Vista Farm Aerodrome	Cumaru do Norte, Pará	07°59′15″S 050°37′54″W	
SNVB	VAL	Valença Airport	Valença, Bahia	13°17′47″S 038°59′33″W	
SNVC		Viçosa Airport	Viçosa, Minas Gerais	20°44′42″S 042°50′29″W	
SNVD		Santa Maria da Vitória Airport	Santa Maria da Vitória, Bahia	13°24′17″S 044°13′23″W	
SNVE		Vale das Estrelas Heliport	Areal, Rio de Janeiro	22°16′15″S 043°08′27″W	
SNVF		Banco Itaú-RJ Heliport	Rio de Janeiro, Rio de Janeiro	22°53′58″S 043°13′25″W	
SNVG		GL Freire Heliport	Campinas, São Paulo	22°54′58″S 047°00′26″W	
SNVH		Santa Helena Farm Aerodrome	Cáceres, Mato Grosso	16°14′31″S 057°59′59″W	
SNVI		Mello Viana Airport	Três Corações, Minas Gerais	21°47′21″S 045°16′05″W	
SNVJ		Senhora Aparecida Farm Aerodrome	Tangará da Serra, Mato Grosso	14°42′14″S 058°32′35″W	
SNVK		Ventura II Farm Aerodrome	São Desidério, Bahia	13°10′26″S 046°14′27″W	
SNVL		Nova Vida Aerodrome	Santana do Araguaia, Pará	09°30′43″S 050°49′55″W	
SNVM		Ventura III Farm Aerodrome	São Desidério, Bahia	13°09′36″S 046°11′49″W	
SNVN		Vitória Santa Farm Aerodrome	Santa Vitória, Minas Gerais	18°56′59″S 050°22′23″W	
SNVO		Vigor Heliport	São Paulo, São Paulo	23°31′59″S 046°36′14″W	Closed
SNVP		Paraíso Farm Aerodrome	Várzea da Palma, Minas Gerais	17°34′55″S 044°57′21″W	
SNVQ		União Farm Aerodrome	Brasilândia, Mato Grosso do Sul	20°40′11″S 052°54′11″W	
SNVR		Skydive Itaparica Aerodrome	Vera Cruz, Bahia	13°01′26″S 038°39′56″W	
SNVS	BVS	Breves Airport	Breves, Pará	01°38′11″S 050°26′36″W	
SNVT		Pires do Rio Heliport	São Caetano do Sul, São Paulo	23°36′55″S 046°32′48″W	
SNVU		Itatuba Farm Aerodrome	Cássia, Minas Gerais	20°25′51″S 046°51′36″W	
SNVV		Valente Airport	Valente, Bahia	11°24′40″S 039°26′36″W	
SNVW		Itanhanga Golf Club Heliport	Rio de Janeiro, Rio de Janeiro	22°59′54″S 043°18′34″W	
SNVX		Helisul Slin Heliport	São José, Santa Catarina	27°32′32″S 048°37′29″W	
SNVY		Ouro Verde Farm Aerodrome	Paranhos, Mato Grosso do Sul	23°58′46″S 055°21′47″W	
SNYZ		Flor da Serra Farm Aerodrome	Jaborandi, Bahia	14°06′03″S 046°10′47″W	
SNWA		Albor Heliport	Araquari, Santa Catarina	26°33′32″S 048°41′59″W	
SNWB		Bom Sossego Aerodrome	Porto Seguro, Bahia	16°22′52″S 039°04′52″W	
SNWC	CMC	Camocim Airport	Camocim, Ceará	02°53′45″S 040°51′32″W	
SNWD		Guavirá Farm Aerodrome	Iguatemi, Mato Grosso do Sul	23°26′01″S 054°36′23″W	
SNWE		Ouro Verde Estate Club Aerodrome	Santa Rita, Paraíba	07°02′47″S 034°54′46″W	
SNWF		Cachoeirinha Farm Aerodrome	Ponta Porã, Mato Grosso do Sul	22°26′24″S 055°14′09″W	
SNWG		Iporã Farm Aerodrome	Itaquiraí, Mato Grosso do Sul	23°34′52″S 054°02′57″W	
SNWH		São Matheus Farm Aerodrome	Querência do Norte, Paraná	22°57′43″S 053°32′48″W	
SNWI		São João do Guaporé Farm Aerodrome	Nova Lacerda, Mato Grosso	14°04′08″S 060°00′33″W	
SNWJ		Rancho Grande Farm Aerodrome	Indiavaí, Mato Grosso	15°12′21″S 058°37′41″W	
SNWK		Santa Terezinha Farm Aerodrome	Pedra Preta, Mato Grosso	16°40′22″S 054°16′13″W	
SNWL		Santarém Farm Aerodrome	Bandeirantes, Mato Grosso do Sul	20°02′43″S 054°09′55″W	
SNWM		Marcelo Machado Heliport	Juiz de Fora, Minas Gerais	21°47′10″S 043°23′49″W	
SNWN		Alexandre Castro e Silva Heliport	Recife, Pernambuco	08°06′42″S 034°53′34″W	
SNWO		Vera Cruz Farm Aerodrome	Amambai, Mato Grosso do Sul	23°01′07″S 054°37′46″W	
SNWP		Parecis Farm Aerodrome	Diamantino, Mato Grosso	13°54′49″S 057°28′46″W	
SNWQ		Santa Cecília Farm Aerodrome	Jari, Rio Grande do Sul	29°19′45″S 054°20′13″W	
SNWR		Wilma Rebelo Aerodrome	Senador Jose Porfirio, Pará	02°38′12″S 051°49′37″W	
SNWS		Crateús Airport	Crateús, Ceará	05°12′40″S 040°42′15″W	
SNWT		M Executive Heliport	Taubaté, São Paulo	23°03′31″S 045°36′23″W	
SNWU		Ponte Quihá Farm Aerodrome	Aral Moreira, Mato Grosso do Sul	23°00′14″S 055°30′32″W	
SNWV		Viganó 3 Heliport	Esmeraldas, Minas Gerais	19°43′32″S 044°23′43″W	
SNWW		Paradise Golf Heliport	Mogi das Cruzes, São Paulo	23°35′26″S 046°15′31″W	
SNWX		Espírito Santo Farm Aerodrome	Campo Grande, Mato Grosso do Sul	20°50′53″S 054°05′36″W	
SNWY		Rodoviária Heliport	Vitória, Espírito Santo	20°19′19″S 040°21′11″W	
SNWZ		Santa Maria Farm Aerodrome	Santana do Araguaia, Pará	09°22′54″S 050°34′04″W	
SNXA		Brigadeiro Sampaio Aerodrome	Tamboril, Ceará	04°51′28″S 040°22′31″W	
SNXB		Caxambu Airport	Caxambu, Minas Gerais	21°55′03″S 044°58′10″W	
SNXC		Viganó 2 Heliport	Betim, Minas Gerais	19°57′15″S 044°04′19″W	Closed
SNXD		Gerdau Heliport	Congonhas, Minas Gerais	20°32′19″S 043°45′24″W	
SNXE		Aero Z Ferrus Aerodrome	Ferreira Gomes, Amapá	00°59′36″N 051°07′15″W	
SNXF		Igarashi 2 Heliport	Cristalina, Goiás	16°04′49″S 047°31′07″W	
SNXG		Fazenda dos Castanhais Aerodrome	Sapucaia, Pará	06°46′29″S 049°21′41″W	
SNXH		Itapicuru Airport	Codó, Maranhão	04°30′48″S 044°01′13″W	
SNXI		Alberto Ramos Aerodrome	Cordisburgo, Minas Gerais	19°05′14″S 044°19′42″W	
SNXJ		Juscelino Plaza Heliport	São Paulo, São Paulo	23°35′21″S 046°40′32″W	
SNXK		Lagoa do Triunfo Farm Aerodrome	São Félix do Xingu, Pará	06°32′20″S 052°46′09″W	
SNXL		Superluna Heliport	Betim, Minas Gerais	19°59′50″S 044°10′44″W	
SNXM		BBP Heliport	Jarinu, São Paulo	23°02′28″S 046°42′31″W	
SNXN		Novo Progresso Farm Aerodrome	Altamira, Pará	06°37′17″S 054°59′02″W	
SNXO		Velo Città Heliport	Mogi Guaçu, São Paulo	22°17′08″S 046°51′04″W	
SNXP		Pontal Farm Aerodrome	Carneirinho, Minas Gerais	19°58′14″S 050°58′12″W	
SNXQ		Xique-Xique Airport	Xique-Xique, Bahia	10°50′03″S 042°41′00″W	
SNXR		Conforto Farm Aerodrome	Itaituba, Pará	07°23′23″S 056°31′13″W	
SNXS		Agropecuária Lazarotto Aerodrome	Tapurah, Mato Grosso	12°36′58″S 056°37′23″W	
SNXT		Alvorada Inn Aerodrome	Barão de Melgaço, Mato Grosso	17°10′53″S 056°01′19″W	
SNXU		Gruta Azul Farm Aerodrome	Dois Irmãos do Buriti, Mato Grosso do Sul	20°28′45″S 055°19′32″W	
SNXV		Tranquilo Testolin Aerodrome	Felixlândia, Minas Gerais	18°45′46″S 045°06′48″W	
SNXW		Yachthouse 01 Heliport	Balneário Camboriú, Santa Catarina	27°00′28″S 048°36′27″W	
SNXX		Maxaranguape Air Base	Maxaranguape, Rio Grande do Norte	05°22′55″S 035°31′51″W	
SNXY		Cikel Brasil Verde Aerodrome	Portel, Pará	02°42′01″S 050°31′43″W	
SNXZ		Nazaré Farm Aerodrome	Santa Filomena, Piauí	09°20′07″S 045°34′21″W	
SNYA	GGF	Almeirim Airport	Almeirim, Pará	01°28′45″S 052°34′41″W	
SNYB		Tito Teixeira Airport	Ituiutaba, Minas Gerais	19°00′05″S 049°29′14″W	
SNYC		CICC Heliport	Rio de Janeiro, Rio de Janeiro	22°54′32″S 043°11′56″W	
SNYD		Ilha dos Sonhos Heliport	Angra dos Reis, Rio de Janeiro	22°58′11″S 044°18′57″W	
SNYE	PHI	Pinheiro Airport	Pinheiro, Maranhão	02°28′39″S 045°06′18″W	
SNYF		Fortaleza Farm Aerodrome	Brasilândia, Mato Grosso do Sul	20°56′50″S 052°43′19″W	
SNYG		Naturágua Heliport	Fortaleza, Ceará	03°49′31″S 038°28′17″W	
SNYH		Vale Sereno Farm Aerodrome	Cumaru do Norte, Pará	08°42′02″S 051°10′21″W	
SNYI		Josidith II Heliport	Leopoldo de Bulhões, Goiás	16°36′55″S 048°47′23″W	
SNYJ		São Jorge Aerodrome	Jacareacanga, Pará	06°08′05″S 057°24′07″W	
SNYK		Isaías Luiz Pereira Aerodrome	Nova Ubiratã, Mato Grosso	13°01′35″S 055°14′23″W	
SNYL		Morro Alto Farm Aerodrome	Nova Canaã do Norte, Mato Grosso	10°30′17″S 055°42′35″W	
SNYM		Malwee Heliport	Jaraguá do Sul, Santa Catarina	26°31′05″S 049°07′38″W	
SNYN		New York Tower Heliport	Araçatuba, São Paulo	21°13′41″S 050°26′13″W	
SNYO		Rio Preto Farm Aerodrome	Guararapes, São Paulo	21°22′45″S 050°41′21″W	
SNYP		Chácara Paraíso Airport	Benevides, Pará	01°19′04″S 048°17′56″W	
SNYQ		Parque Empresarial Campinas Heliport	Campinas, São Paulo	22°50′19″S 047°02′03″W	
SNYR		Água Azul Farm Aerodrome	Itaituba, Pará	05°56′31″S 056°33′10″W	
SNYS		WD Agroindustrial Aerodrome	João Pinheiro, Minas Gerais	18°13′22″S 045°59′44″W	
SNYT		Ituaçu Aerodrome	Ituaçu, Bahia	13°49′43″S 041°18′08″W	
SNYU		Iturama Airport	Iturama, Minas Gerais	19°43′02″S 050°13′13″W	
SNYV		Sococo Farm Aerodrome	Moju, Pará	02°07′11″S 048°38′45″W	
SNYW		Antônio Guerreiro Aerodrome	Guimarães, Maranhão	02°06′37″S 044°39′06″W	
SNYX		Fenix Farm Aerodrome	Carangola, Minas Gerais	20°46′46″S 041°59′42″W	
SNYY		Sítio São Luiz Aerodrome	Boa Esperança, Paraná	24°15′45″S 052°47′32″W	
SNYZ		Rio 18 Farm Aerodrome	Cumaru do Norte, Pará	08°26′18″S 051°17′05″W	
SNZA		Pouso Alegre Airport	Pouso Alegre, Minas Gerais	22°17′20″S 045°55′10″W	
SNZB		Sumidor Ranch Aerodrome	Pouso Redondo, Santa Catarina	27°11′31″S 049°49′53″W	
SNZC		Cervinho Farm Aerodrome	Aquidauana, Mato Grosso do Sul	19°39′38″S 055°37′31″W	
SNZD		Capivara Farm Aerodrome	Pimenteiras do Oeste, Rondônia	13°23′29″S 061°04′08″W	
SNZE		Santa Zélia Farm Aerodrome	Itaqui, Rio Grande do Sul	29°18′01″S 055°53′20″W	
SNZF		AFG II Aerodrome	Tangará da Serra, Mato Grosso	14°24′19″S 058°13′46″W	
SNZG		São Benedito Farm Aerodrome	Capão Bonito, São Paulo	23°51′40″S 048°14′12″W	
SNZH		Novo Horizonte Farm Aerodrome	Jaíba, Minas Gerais	15°25′56″S 043°54′41″W	
SNZI		Helvétia Heliport	Indaiatuba, São Paulo	23°03′36″S 047°09′36″W	
SNZJ		América Building Heliport	Araraquara, São Paulo	21°48′18″S 048°10′25″W	
SNZK		Canadá Farm Aerodrome	Itacarambi, Minas Gerais	15°01′24″S 044°02′36″W	
SNZL		Usina São Luiz Aerodrome	Ourinhos, São Paulo	22°56′51″S 049°45′40″W	
SNZM		JCPM Trade Centre Heliport	Recife, Pernambuco	08°05′23″S 034°52′55″W	
SNZN		Naná Porã Farm Aerodrome	Sete Quedas, Mato Grosso do Sul	23°50′16″S 055°11′05″W	
SNZO		Bebida Velha Farm Aerodrome	Touros, Rio Grande do Norte	05°17′50″S 035°32′11″W	
SNZP		Três Lagoas Farm Aerodrome	Sapezal, Mato Grosso	13°15′30″S 058°43′41″W	
SNZQ		Yamana Gold Heliport	Jacobina, Bahia	11°15′36″S 040°31′06″W	
SNZR	PYT	Paracatu Airport	Paracatu, Minas Gerais	17°14′34″S 046°52′59″W	
SNZS		Vô Zeca Farm Aerodrome	Santa Terezinha, Mato Grosso	10°20′55″S 050°40′35″W	
SNZT		Recreio Farm Aerodrome	Paragominas, Pará	03°30′18″S 048°20′01″W	
SNZU		Vila Nova Aerodrome	Tomé-Açu, Pará	02°51′20″S 048°13′58″W	
SNZV		Beira Rio Farm Aerodrome	Ulianópolis, Pará	03°43′22″S 047°28′40″W	
SNZW		Ituberá Aerodrome	Ituberá, Bahia	13°43′54″S 039°08′26″W	
SNZX		WSTC Heliport	Fortaleza, Ceará	03°47′17″S 038°28′47″W	
SNZY		Lago Vermelho Farm Aerodrome	Buritizeiro, Minas Gerais	17°02′07″S 045°29′11″W	Closed
SNZZ		Muzzi Aerodrome	Coruripe, Alagoas	09°58′04″S 036°11′56″W	

== SO - French Guiana ==
Also see airport category and list.

ICAO	IATA	Airport name	Community	Coordinates
SOCA	CAY	Cayenne-Rochambeau Airport	Cayenne	04°49′11″N 052°21′43″W
SOCM		Camopi Airport	Camopi	03°10′20″N 052°20′10″W
SOGS		Grand-Santi Airport	Grand-Santi	04°17′00″N 054°22′52″W
SOOA	MPY	Maripasoula Airport	Maripasoula	03°39′27″N 054°02′14″W
SOOG	OYP	Saint-Georges-de-l'Oyapock Airport	Saint-Georges-de-l'Oyapock	03°53′36″N 051°48′20″W
SOOK		Kourou Airport	Kourou	05°10′25″N 052°41′29″W
SOOM	LDX	Saint-Laurent-du-Maroni Airport	Saint-Laurent-du-Maroni	05°28′59″N 054°02′04″W
SOOR	REI	Régina Airport	Régina	04°18′53″N 052°07′54″W
SOOS	XAU	Saül Airport	Saül	03°36′49″N 053°12′15″W
SOOY		Sinnamary Airport	Sinnamary	05°22′25″N 052°56′44″W
SOSA		Ouanary Airport	Ouanary	04°12′36″N 051°40′04″W

== SP - Peru ==
Also see airport category and list.

ICAO	IATA	Airport name	Community	Coordinates	Notes
SPAB		Huancabamba Aerodrome	Huancabamba, Piura Region	05°15′24″S 079°26′34″W	
SPAC		Ciro Alegria Airport	Santa Maria de Nieva, Amazonas	04°36′35″S 077°56′30″W	
SPAF		Abancay Airport	Abancay, Apurímac	13°38′00″S 072°55′00″W	Not yet open; coordinates unverified
SPAI		Urpay Airport	Urpay District, La Libertad Region	08°20′59″S 077°23′53″W	
SPAM		Río Los Amigos Airport	Manú, Madre de Dios Region	12°33′26″S 070°06′23″W	Closed
SPAO	APE	San Juan Aposento Airport	San Juan Aposento	15°21′14″S 075°10′02″W	Closed
SPAP		Picota Aerodrome	Picota, San Martín Region	06°54′00″S 076°23′00″W	Coordinates unverified
SPAR	ALD	Alerta Airport	Alerta, Ucayali Region	11°39′00″S 069°13′45″W	
SPAS		Alférez FAP Alfredo Vladimir Sara Bauer Airport	Andoas, Loreto Region	02°47′45″S 076°28′00″W	
SPAY	AYX	Tnte. Gral. Gerardo Pérez Pinedo Airport	Atalaya, Ucayali Region	10°43′45″S 073°46′00″W	
SPBB	MBP	Moyobamba Airport	Moyobamba, San Martín Region	06°01′15″S 076°59′15″W	
SPBC		Caballococha Airport	Caballococha, Loreto Region	03°55′00″S 070°30′30″W	
SPBD		Balta Aerodrome	Balta, Ucayali Region	10°10′00″S 071°25′00″W	Coordinates unverified
SPBJ		Buncuyo Aerodrome	Buncuyo, Loreto Region	06°31′00″S 074°35′00″W	Coordinates unverified
SPBK		Breu Aerodrome	Yurúa District, Ucayali Region	09°32′02″S 072°45′26″W	
SPBL		Bolognesi Airport	Bolognesi, Ucayali Region	10°01′45″S 073°56′30″W	
SPBR	IBP	Iberia Airport	Iberia District, Madre de Dios Region	11°24′35″S 069°29′25″W	
SPBS		Bellavista Airport	Jeberos, Loreto Region	05°17′20″S 076°17′20″W	
SPBT		Oventeni Aerodrome	Oventeni, Ucayali Region	10°45′15″S 074°13′18″W	
SPCC		Ciudad Constitución Airport	Ciudad Constitución, Pasco Region	09°51′50″S 075°00′25″W	
SPCH		Tocache Airport	Tocache, San Martín Region	08°11′43″S 076°31′45″W	
SPCI		Campamento de Ilo Airport	Uruhuasi, Moquegua Region	17°36′56″S 071°19′51″W	
SPCL	PCL	FAP Captain David Abensur Rengifo International Airport	Pucallpa, Ucayali Region	08°22′40″S 074°34′27″W	
SPCM	CTF	Contamana Airport	Contamana, Loreto Region	07°20′08″S 074°59′35″W	
SPCP		Pucacaca Aerodrome	Pucacaca District, San Martín Region	06°50′32″S 076°20′20″W	
SPCV		Cutivireni Aerodrome	Río Tambo District, Junín Region	11°52′38″S 073°55′01″W	
SPCY		Chao Airport	Chao, La Libertad Region	08°34′54″S 078°40′52″W	
SPDC		Chicosa Aerodrome	Chicosa, Ucayali Region	10°23′00″S 074°00′00″W	Coordinates unverified
SPDF		Chivay Airport	Chivay, Arequipa Region	15°38′10″S 071°36′50″W	
SPDN		Colonia Angamos Airport	Colonia Angamos, Loreto Region	05°08′15″S 072°52′05″W	
SPDO		Mollendo Airport	Mollendo, Arequipa Region	17°02′45″S 071°58′50″W	
SPDR		Trompeteros Airport	Corrientes, Loreto Region	03°48′20″S 075°02′20″W	
SPDS		Cuajone Botiflaca Airport	Cuajone, Moquegua Region	17°04′15″S 070°46′15″W	
SPDU		Puebro Libre del Codo Airport	Codo del Pozuzo District, Huánuco Region	09°39′52″S 075°17′07″W	
SPEE		El Estrecho Airport	San Antonio del Estrecho, Loreto Region	02°27′10″S 072°40′20″W	
SPEN		Iscozacín Aerodrome	Iscozacín, Pasco Region	10°11′28″S 075°09′37″W	
SPEO	CHM	Teniente FAP Jaime A. de Montreuil Morales Airport	Chimbote, Ancash Region	09°09′00″S 078°31′25″W	
SPEP		Puerto Esperanza Airport	Esperanza, Ucayali	09°46′05″S 070°42′25″W	
SPEQ		Cesar Torque Podesta Airport	Moquegua, Moquegua Region	17°10′45″S 070°55′50″W	
SPES		Esperanza/Amuesha Aerodrome	Cimijachana, Pasco Region	10°15′00″S 075°26′00″W	Coordinates unverified
SPEZ		Puerto Bermúdez Aerodrome	Puerto Bermúdez District, Pasco Region	10°18′00″S 074°56′00″W	
SPGA		Pata de Gallo Airport	Quiruvilca, La Libertad Region	07°59′00″S 078°16′00″W	
SPGB		Galilea Aerodrome	Galilea, Amazonas Region	04°01′54″S 077°45′32″W	
SPGC		Gochapita Aerodrome	Gochapita, La Libertad Region	08°17′00″S 077°16′00″W	Coordinates unverified
SPGL		Chagual Airport	Pataz, La Libertad Region	07°47′50″S 077°39′05″W	
SPGM	TGI	Tingo María Airport	Tingo María, Huánuco Region	09°17′15″S 076°00′18″W	
SPGP		Güeppi Airport	Güeppi, Loreto Region	00°07′15″S 075°15′00″W	
SPHI	CIX	FAP Captain José Abelardo Quiñones González International Airport	Chiclayo, Lambayeque Region	06°47′15″S 079°49′40″W	
SPHO	AYP	Coronel FAP Alfredo Mendívil Duarte Airport	Ayacucho, Ayacucho Region	13°09′15″S 074°12′15″W	
SPHY	ANS	Andahuaylas Airport	Andahuaylas, Apurímac Region	13°42′30″S 073°21′05″W	
SPHZ	ATA	Comandante FAP Germán Arias Graziani Airport	Anta/Huaraz, Ancash Region	09°20′50″S 077°35′55″W	
SPID		Lieutenant Bergerie Airport	Iquitos, Loreto Region	03°44′28″S 073°15′42″W	
SPIL	UMI	Quince Mil Airport	Quince Mil, Cusco Region	13°13′55″S 070°45′10″W	
SPIN		Iñapari Airport	Iñapari, Madre de Dios Region	10°58′45″S 069°33′35″W	
SPIP	SFK	Satipo Airport	Satipo, Junín Region	11°15′45″S 074°38′52″W	
SPIR		Patria Aerodrome	Patria, Cusco Region	12°58′02″S 071°25′45″W	
SPIS		Pias Airport	Pias, La Libertad Region	07°55′15″S 077°31′30″W	
SPIY		Yauri Airport	Yauri, Cusco Region	14°47′40″S 071°25′55″W	
SPIZ	UCZ	Uchiza Airport	Uchiza District, San Martín Region	08°28′25″S 076°27′38″W	
SPJA	RIJ	Juan Simons Vela Airport	Rioja, San Martín Region	06°04′05″S 077°09′35″W	
SPJB		Pampa Grande Airport	Cajabamba, Cajamarca Region	07°36′50″S 078°03′40″W	
SPJC	LIM	Jorge Chávez International Airport	Callao/Lima, Lima Metropolitan Area	12°01′19″S 077°06′52″W	
SPJE	JAE	Jaén Airport	Jaén, Cajamarca Region	05°35′35″S 078°46′25″W	
SPJI	JJI	Juanjuí Airport	Juanjuí, San Martín Region	07°10′10″S 076°43′45″W	
SPJJ	JAU	Francisco Carle Airport	Jauja, Junín Region	11°47′00″S 075°28′25″W	Formerly SPHU
SPJL	JUL	Inca Manco Cápac International Airport	Puno/Juliaca, Puno Region	15°28′00″S 070°09′30″W	
SPJN	SJA	San Juan de Marcona Airport	San Juan de Marcona, Ica Region	15°21′10″S 075°08′15″W	
SPJR	CJA	Major General FAP Armando Revoredo Iglesias Airport	Cajamarca, Cajamarca Region	07°08′25″S 078°29′20″W	
SPKG		Kirigueti Aerodrome	Kirigueti, Cusco Region	11°34′27″S 073°07′43″W	
SPKI		Kiteni Airport	Kiteni, Cusco Region	12°38′55″S 073°02′12″W	Formerly SPQI
SPLC		Mariano Melgar Airport	La Joya, Arequipa Region	16°47′30″S 071°53′12″W	
SPLH		Las Dunas Airport	Ica, Ica Region	14°02′10″S 075°45′35″W	
SPLN	RIM	San Nicolas Airport	Rodríguez de Mendoza	06°23′30″S 077°30′10″W	
SPLO	ILQ	Ilo Airport	Ilo, Moquegua Region	17°41′45″S 071°20′35″W	Also SPIA
SPLP		Las Palmas Air Base	Barranco, Lima Province	12°09′35″S 077°00′00″W	
SPLS		Zorrillos Aerodrome	Curimaná District, Ucayali Region	08°26′17″S 075°11′40″W	
SPLX		Lib Mandy Metropolitano Airport	San Bartolo District, Lima Region	12°23′20″S 076°45′30″W	
SPME	TBP	Capitán FAP Pedro Canga Rodríguez Airport	Tumbes, Tumbes Region	03°33′05″S 080°22′55″W	
SPMF	MZA	Mayor Nancy Flores Páucar Airport	Mazamari, Junín Region	11°19′30″S 074°32′10″W	
SPMG		Mazuko Aerodrome	Mazuko, Madre de Dios Region	13°05′59″S 070°22′12″W	Closed
SPMR	SMG	Santa Maria Airport	Santa Maria, Lima Metropolitan Area	12°23′29″S 076°45′21″W	
SPMS	YMS	Moisés Benzaquén Rengifo Airport	Yurimaguas, Loreto Region	05°53′37″S 076°07′05″W	
SPMU		Los Misioneros Aerodrome	Satipo, Junín Region	11°13′46″S 074°37′11″W	
SPNC	HUU	Alférez FAP David Figueroa Fernandini Airport	Huánuco, Huánuco Region	09°52′45″S 076°12′20″W	
SPNM		Nuevo Mundo Airport	Nuevo Mundo, Cusco Region	11°32′32″S 073°08′32″W	
SPNP		Ventilla Aerodrome	Puno, Puno Region	15°51′05″S 070°03′31″W	
SPNT		Intuto Aerodrome	Intuto, Loreto Region	03°29′35″S 074°46′25″W	
SPNU		Manú Airport	Manu, Madre de Dios Region	12°17′20″S 070°53′25″W	
SPOA	SFS	Saposoa Airport	Saposoa, San Martín Region	06°57′25″S 076°46′10″W	
SPOL		Collique Airport	Lima	11°55′43″S 077°03′40″W	Closed
SPON		Orellana Aerodrome	Orellana, Loreto Region	06°53′48″S 075°09′11″W	Closed
SPOR		Orcopampa Airport	Orcopampa, Arequipa Region	15°18′45″S 072°21′00″W	
SPOV		Shiringayoc/Hacienda Mejia Airport	Tahuamanu District, Madre de Dios Region	11°54′00″S 069°10′00″W	Coordinates unverified
SPOY		Atico Airport	Atico District, Arequipa Region	16°14′00″S 073°36′15″W	
SPPA		Puerto Ocopa Aerodrome	Puerto Ocopa, Junín Region	11°08′00″S 074°21′00″W	Coordinates unverified
SPPB		Tipishsa Airport	Breu, Ucayali Region	09°32′00″S 072°45′25″W	
SPPG		Paramonga Aerodrome	Paramonga, Lima Region	10°40′00″S 077°50′00″W	Coordinates unverified
SPPH		Pampa Hermosa Aerodrome	Pampa Hermosa, Loreto Region	07°12′04″S 075°17′39″W	
SPPN		Palmas Del Espino Airport	Tocache, San Martín Region	08°20′40″S 076°29′22″W	
SPPO		Delfin Del Pozuzo Aerodrome	Pozuzo, Pasco Region	10°07′07″S 075°32′23″W	
SPPR		Chilca Airport	Chilca, Lima Region	12°30′10″S 076°44′44″W	Closed
SPPT		Paititi Aerodrome	Paititi, Ucayali Region	09°59′47″S 072°49′43″W	
SPPY	CHH	Chachapoyas Airport	Chachapoyas, Amazonas Region	06°12′05″S 077°51′25″W	
SPQM		San Lorenzo Airport	San Lorenzo, Loreto	04°49′25″S 076°33′40″W	
SPQN	REQ	Requena Airport	Requena, Loreto Region	05°04′35″S 073°51′25″W	
SPQO		San Marcos Aerodrome	San Marcos, Ucayali Region	09°52′50″S 070°52′32″W	
SPQT	IQT	Coronel FAP Francisco Secada Vignetta International Airport	Iquitos, Loreto Region	03°47′05″S 073°18′30″W	
SPQU	AQP	Rodríguez Ballón International Airport	Arequipa, Arequipa Region	16°20′25″S 071°34′00″W	
SPRF		San Rafael Airport	San Rafael, Puno Region	14°16′55″S 070°22′50″W	
SPRM		Capitán FAP Leonardo Alvariño Herr Airport	San Ramón, Junín Region	11°07′45″S 075°21′02″W	
SPRR		Revalora Aerodrome	Pampa Melchorita, Lima Region	13°13′23″S 076°16′09″W	
SPRU	TRU	Capitán FAP Carlos Martínez de Pinillos International Airport	Trujillo, La Libertad Region	08°04′50″S 079°06′30″W	
SPSE		Sepahua Airport	Sepahua, Ucayali Region	11°08′35″S 073°02′00″W	
SPSH		Shanusa Aerodrome	Yurimaguas, Loreto Region	06°07′43″S 076°10′10″W	
SPSI		Siguas Aeodrome	Siguas, Arequipa Region	16°22′00″S 072°10′00″W	Coordinates unverified
SPSO	PIO	Capitán FAP Renán Elías Olivera Airport	Pisco, Ica Region	13°44′42″S 076°13′15″W	
SPSR		Palmapampa Airport	Palmapampa, Ayacucho Region	12°45′50″S 073°39′10″W	Formerly SPPE
SPSS		Masisea Aerodrome	Masisea District, Ucayali Region	08°36′44″S 074°18′37″W	
SPST	TPP	Comandante FAP Guillermo del Castillo Paredes Airport	Tarapoto, San Martín Region	06°30′30″S 076°22′25″W	
SPSU		Santa Lucía Airport	Santa Lucía, San Martín Region	08°20′04″S 076°23′08″W	
SPTE		Pichari Aerodrome	Pichari, Cusco Region	12°30′11″S 073°51′10″W	
SPTI		Puerto Inca Aerodrome	Puerto Inca, Huánuco Region	09°23′00″S 074°58′00″W	Coordinates unverified
SPTM		Timpia Aerodrome	Timpia, Cusco Region	12°05′02″S 072°49′31″W	
SPTN	TCQ	Coronel FAP Carlos Ciriani Santa Rosa Airport	Tacna, Tacna Region	18°03′05″S 070°16′30″W	
SPTO		Tulpo Airport	Mollebamba, La Libertad Region	08°07′35″S 077°59′15″W	
SPTP		El Pato Air Base	Talara, Piura Region	04°33′00″S 081°13′27″W	
SPTQ		Toquepala Airport	Toquepala, Tacna Region	17°17′58″S 070°39′15″W	
SPTR		Tournavista Aerodrome	Tournavista District, Huánuco Region	08°55′02″S 074°42′47″W	
SPTU	PEM	Padre Aldamiz International Airport	Puerto Maldonado, Madre de Dios Region	12°36′49″S 069°13′43″W	
SPTV		Taini Aerodrome	Taini, Cusco Region	11°34′52″S 073°24′02″W	
SPTZ		Tangoshiari Aerodrome	Tangoshiari, Cusco Region	11°46′01″S 073°19′30″W	
SPUC		Huamachuco Airport	Huamachuco, La Libertad Region	07°49′04″S 078°01′45″W	
SPUI		Culina Aerodrome	Purús District, Ucayali Region	09°35′04″S 070°37′04″W	
SPUR	PIU	Capitán FAP Guillermo Concha Iberico Airport	Piura/Talara, Piura Region	05°12′20″S 080°37′00″W	
SPVI		Vicco Airport	Vicco District, Pasco Region	10°50′40″S 076°14′50″W	
SPVL		Caravelí Aerodrome	Caravelí, Arequipa Region	15°46′51″S 073°21′39″W	
SPVN		Vilcashuamán Airport	Vilcashuamán, Ayacucho Region	13°40′50″S 073°55′30″W	
SPVT		Mayor FAP Guillermo Protset del Castillo Airport	La Joya District, Arequipa Region	16°25′30″S 071°50′05″W	Military operations use code SPVR
SPWB	PTL	Walter Braedt Segú Aerodrome	Punta Sal / Máncora, Tumbes Region	04°05′12″S 081°01′32″W	
SPWT	VVN	Las Malvinas Airport	Las Malvinas, Cusco Region	11°51′00″S 072°56′25″W	
SPYL	TYL	Capitán FAP Víctor Montes Arias International Airport	Talara, Piura Region	04°34′35″S 081°15′15″W	
SPYO		Pacasmayo Airport	Pacasmayo, La Libertad Region	07°24′50″S 079°34′13″W	
SPYU		Yauca Aerodrome	Yauca District, Arequipa Region	15°37′08″S 074°32′10″W	Closed
SPZA	NZC	Maria Reiche Neuman Airport	Nazca, Ica Region	14°51′15″S 074°57′40″W	
SPZO	CUZ	Subteniente FAP Alejandro Velasco Astete International Airport	Cusco, Cusco Region	13°32′08″S 071°56′37″W	
