= Portel Municipality =

Portel Municipality may refer to:

- Portel Municipality, Portugal
- Portel, Pará, Brazil
