= Juruti =

Juruti may refer to:

- Tucano language of Brazil
- Juruti, Brazil, a Brazilian city
