= Naviraí =

- Municipality
- The Municipality of Naviraí
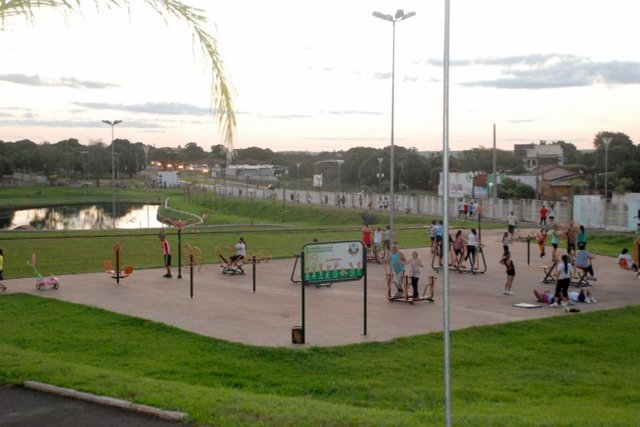
- View of Parque Sucupira, Naviraí

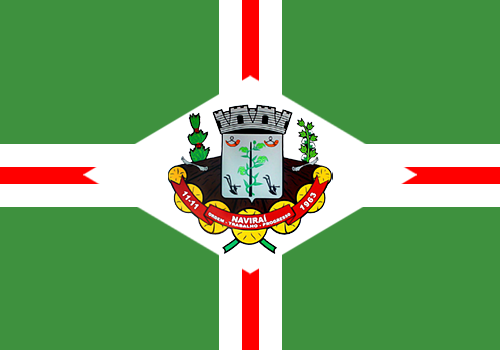
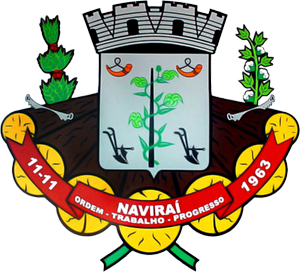
- Flag Coat of arms
- Nicknames: Portuguese: Ordem, Trabalho, Progresso, lit. 'Order, Work, Progress'
- Motto: Portuguese: Corredor do Mercosul, lit. 'Corridor of Mercosur'
- Location in the State of Mato Grosso do Sul
- Coordinates: 23°03′44″S 54°12′07″W
- Country: Brazil
- State: Mato Grosso do Sul
- Region: Center-West
- Microregion: Iguatemi
- Founded: 1952

Government
  - Mayor: Leandro Peres de Matos (PP)

Area
  - Municipality: 3,193.8 km^{2} (1,233.1 sq mi)
  - Urban: 7.3 km^{2} (2.8 sq mi)
- Elevation: 362 m (1,188 ft)

Population (2020)
  - Municipality: 55,689
  - Density: 14.5/km^{2} (38/sq mi)
- Time zone: UTC−4 (AMT)
- Postal Code: 79950-000
- Area code: +55 67
- Website: navirai.ms.gov.br

Naviraí is a municipality located in the Brazilian state of Mato Grosso do Sul.

Founded in 1952 and emancipated [separated administratively] in 1963, Naviraí has a radial urban plan with pathways that convert the center to the periphery, formatted similarly to a cobweb.

== History ==
The city of Navirai was planned by Colonizadora Vera Cruz Mato Grosso Ltda.

Naviraí's settlement began, by plane and by boat, at the beginning of the 1950s. With the construction of the road from Dourados, it began to develop more speed. Originally, it was named Vera Cruz, after the company, and since 1958 has had the current name. From then the city developed and became one of the most important of Mato Grosso do Sul. Within decades of foundation were three major economic phases which can be divided as follows as follows:

- phase of timber extraction and agricultural production (notably the planting of coffee);
- phase of the great cycle of wood and the modernization of agriculture (cotton cycle) and livestock;
- phase of development of agribusiness and Service (1990 onwards).

=== Development of construction ===
In 90 years there has been increasing economic development allied construction was crucial to Naviraí experiencing an outbreak of buildings and luxury residences located in both the central core when the outer boroughs. Thus, the urban changes contrasted with the social ills and the need for public policies to solve such problems. If not addressed Naviraí ran the risk of becoming stagnant. However, economic policies prevented the city from being lost economically. Among these investments are Copasul (refrigerators), Coopernavi / Usinavi, agribusiness, the garment industry and a strong trade and diversification.

A land conflict with Guaraní people in Naviraí has led to occasions of serious violence, including in 2015 and near to 2026

== Geography ==
=== Location ===
The city is located 370 km from the capital of the state (Campo Grande) and 1301 km from the national capital (Brasília). The city is adjacent to Jateí, Itaquiraí, Iguatemi, Juti, Alto Paraíso, Icaraíma and Querência do Norte.

The municipality contains 21% of the 73,345-hectare (181,240-acre) Rio Ivinhema State Park, created in 1998.

=== Rivers ===
The city is under the influence of the Rio Paraná, the La Plata river belongs to the river system. Next Rivers:

- Rio Amambai: right tributary of the Paraná River.
- Rio Curupaí: right tributary of the Paraná River.
- Rio Ivinhema: right tributary of the Paraná River.
- Rio Laranjaí: right tributary of the Rio Ivinhema.

=== Vegetation ===
The area is part of the Cerrado (savanna of central Brazil).

=== Climate ===
The city has a subtropical climate (CFA). Rainy season is between October and March. The average temperature of the coldest month is varied from 1400 to 1700 mm between 14 °C and 15 °C.

== People ==
Population of Navirai
| Year | People |
|---|---|
| 1970 | 23,117 |
| 1980 | 28,564 |
| 1991 | 30,670 |
| 1996 | 34,670 |
| 2000 | 36,662 |
| 2005 | 40,416 |
| 2006 | 41,091 |
| 2007 | 43,391 |
| 2008 | 44,828 |
| 2009 | 45,627 |
| 2010 | 46,424 |
| 2011 | 47,173 |
| 2012 | 47,899 |
| 2013 | 49,827 |
| 2014 | 50,692 |

== Religion ==
Naviraí is home to the Roman Catholic Diocese of Naviraí. The Bishop is Ettore Dotti (C.S.F.), since June 1, 2011.

== Transportation ==
Naviraí is served by Naviraí Airport located 3.7 km from downtown Naviraí, the bus Alternav, federal highway BR-163, as well as state highways.

== Sports ==
Clube Esportivo Naviraiense is the municipality's football (soccer) club. They competed in the Série D in 2009. The team has participated four times in the Brazil Cup (2010, 2011, 2013 and 2014).
