= Juruti Airport =

Juruti Airport Aeroporto de Juruti
- IATA: JRT; ICAO: SNRJ; LID: PA0103

Summary
- Airport type: Private
- Serves: Juruti
- Time zone: BRT (UTC−03:00)
- Elevation AMSL: 33 m (108 ft)
- Coordinates: 02°11′12″S 056°05′25″W

Map
- Location in Brazil JRT (Brazil)

Runways
Direction	Length		Surface
Direction	m	ft	Surface
08/26	1,050	3,445	Gravel
- Sources: ANAC, DECEA

Juruti Airport (IATA: JRT, ICAO: SNRJ) formerly SJOH, is the airport serving Juruti, Brazil.

== Access ==
The airport is located 4 km (2 mi) from downtown Juruti.

== See also ==
- List of airports in Brazil
