= Urupá =

Municipality in Rondônia, Brazil

- Municipality
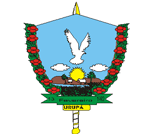
- Flag Coat of arms

- Location in Rondônia state

- Location in Brazil
- Coordinates: 11°8′26″S 62°21′39″W
- Country: Brazil
- Region: North
- State: Rondônia

Area
  - Total: 832 km^{2} (321 sq mi)

Population (2020)
  - Total: 11,272
  - Density: 13.5/km^{2} (35.1/sq mi)
- Time zone: UTC−4 (AMT)

Urupá is a municipality located in the Brazilian state of Rondônia. Its population was 11,272 (2020) and its area is 832 km^{2}.
