= Buritirama =

Municipality of Bahia, Brazil

Buritirama Município de Buritirama
- Municipality
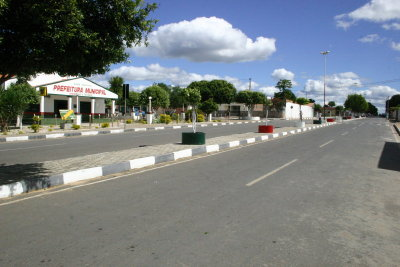
- View of Buritirama

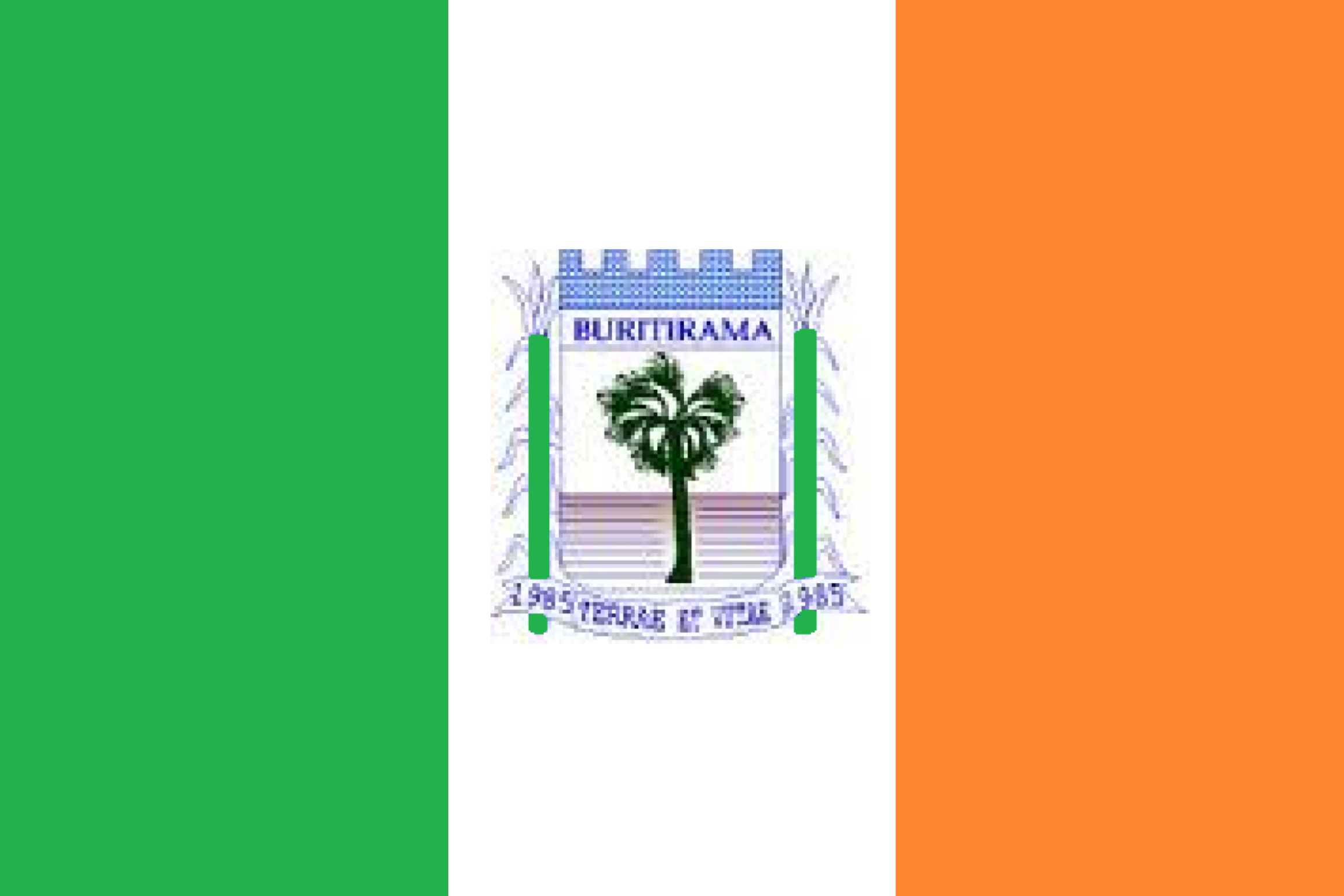
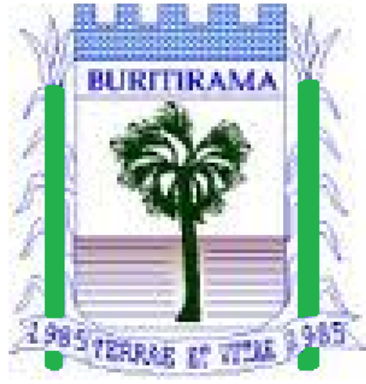
- Flag Coat of arms

- Location of Buritirama in Bahia

- Location of Buritirama in the Brazil
- Coordinates: 10°42′28″S 43°37′51″W
- Country: Brazil
- Region: Northeast
- State: Bahia
- Founded: 1986

Government
  - Mayor: Arival Marques Viana (PP, 2013-2016)

Area
  - Total: 3,941.872 km^{2} (1,521.965 sq mi)
- Elevation: 492 m (1,614 ft)

Population (2020)
  - Total: 21,276
  - Density: 5.3974/km^{2} (13.979/sq mi)
- Demonym: buritiramense
- Time zone: UTC−3 (BRT)
- Website: pmburitirama.ba.ipmbrasil.org.br

Buritirama is a municipality in the state of Bahia in the North-East region of Brazil. Buritirama covers 3,941.872 km^{2} (1,521.965 mi^{2}), and has a population of 21,276 with a population density of 5.4 inhabitants per square kilometer.

== See also ==
- List of municipalities in Bahia
