= La Joya District =

Coordinates: 16°43′34″S 71°51′40″W

La Joya
- District
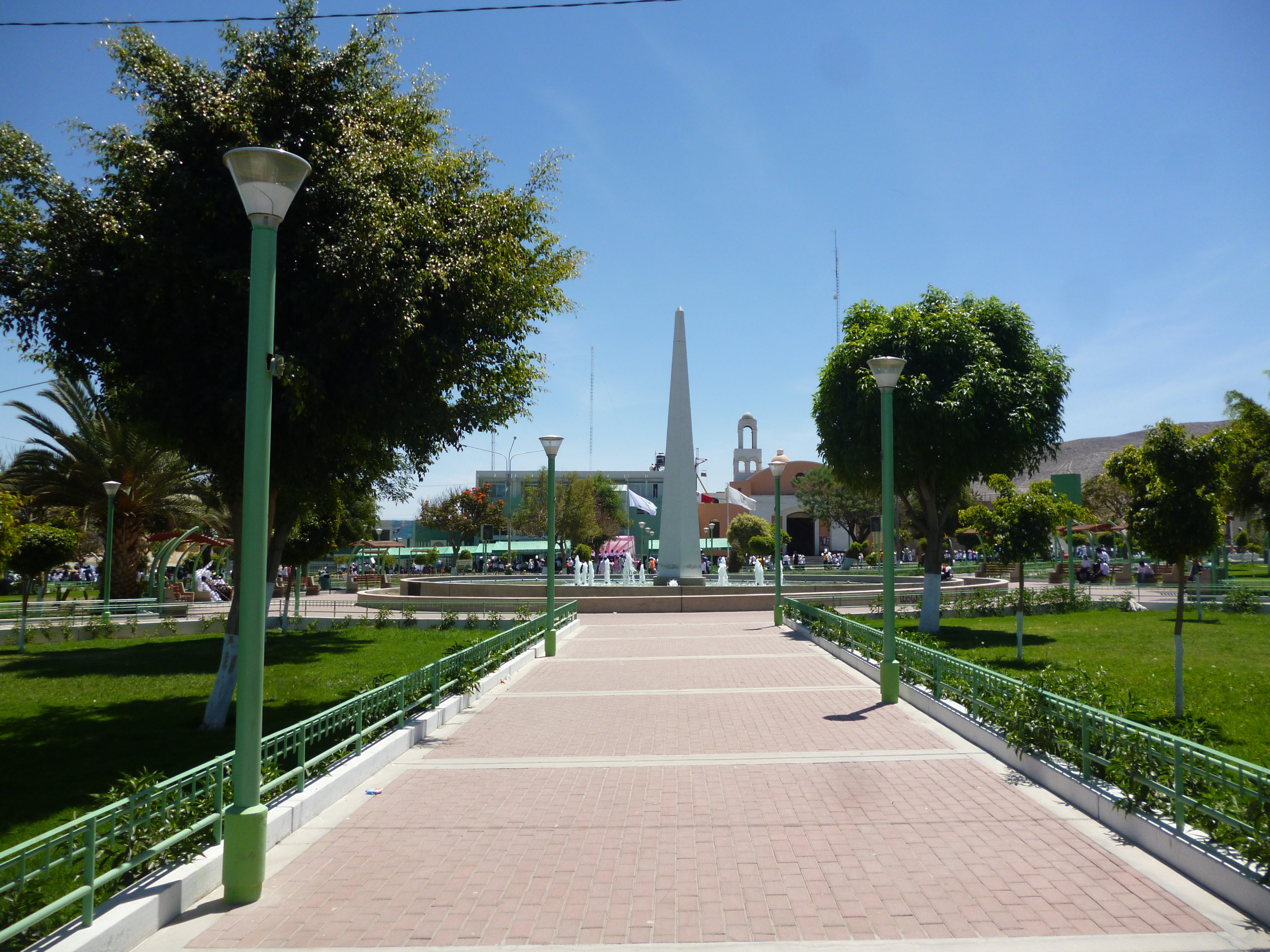
- La Joya
- Interactive map of La Joya
- Country: Peru
- Region: Arequipa
- Province: Arequipa
- Founded: March 25, 1952
- Capital: La Joya

Government
  - Mayor: David Santos Inofuente Mamani

Area
  - Total: 670.22 km^{2} (258.77 sq mi)
- Elevation: 1,620 m (5,310 ft)

Population (2005 census)
  - Total: 22,513
  - Density: 33.590/km^{2} (86.999/sq mi)
- Time zone: UTC-5 (PET)
- UBIGEO: 040108

La Joya District is one of twenty-nine districts of the province Arequipa in Peru.

The district is served by Mariano Melgar Airport.
