= Ibotirama =

Municipality of Bahia, Brazil

Ibotirama Município de Ibotirama
- Municipality
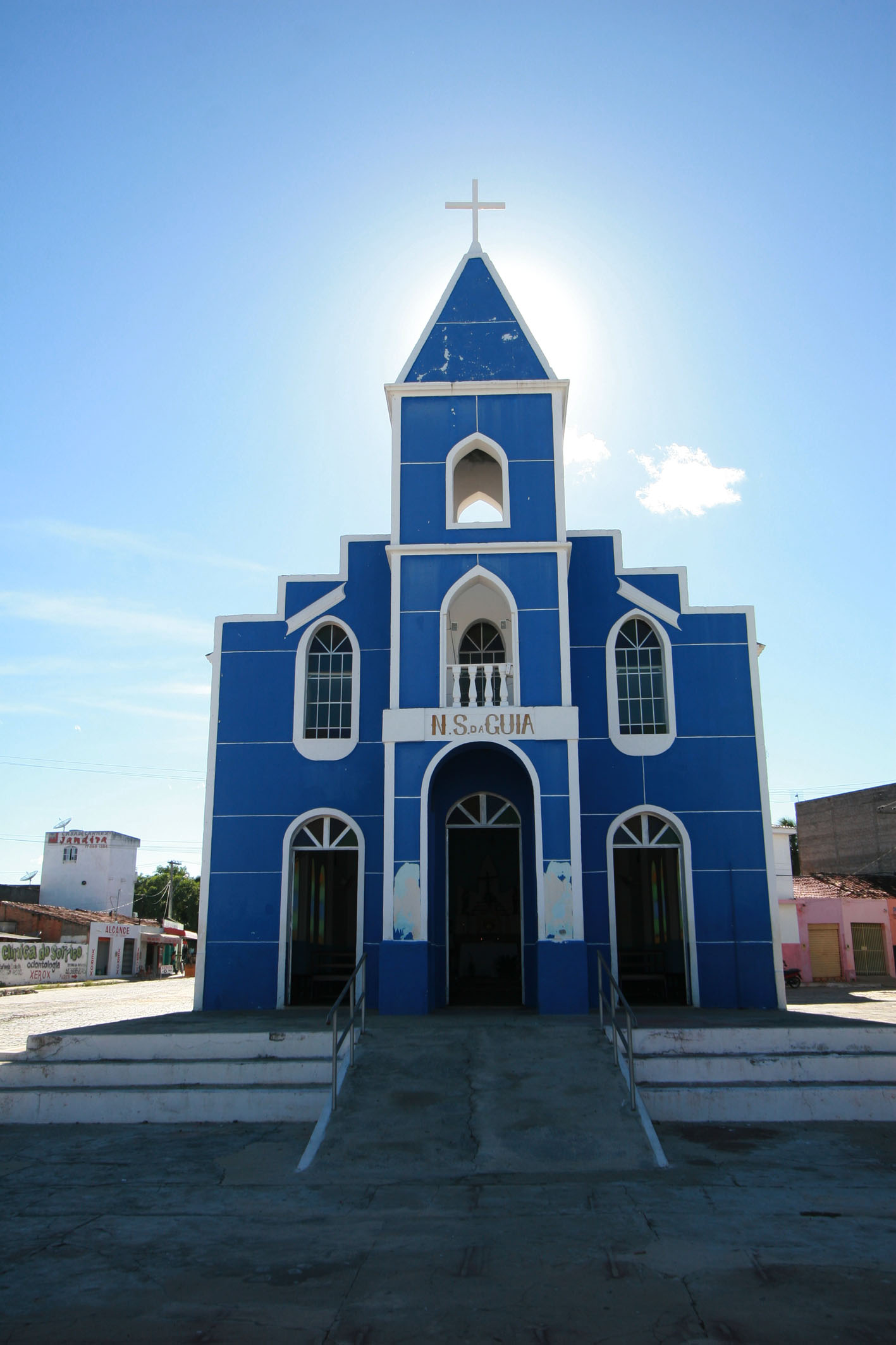
- Church of Nossa Senhora da Guia

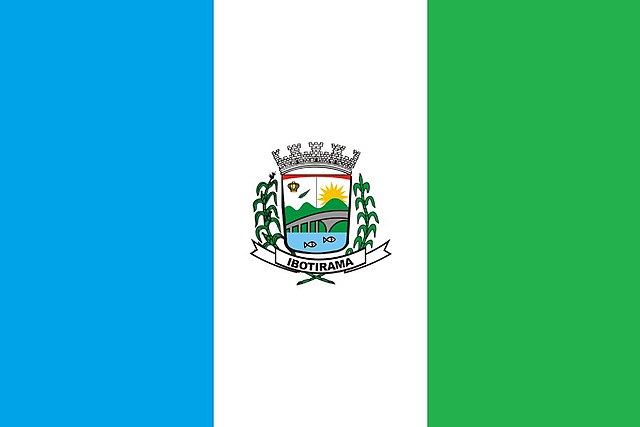
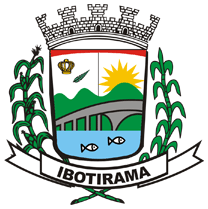
- Flag Coat of arms

- Location of Ibotirama in Bahia

- Location of Ibotirama in the Brazil
- Coordinates: 12°11′06″S 43°13′15″W
- Country: Brazil
- Region: Northeast
- State: Bahia
- Founded: August 14, 1959

Government
  - Mayor: Claudir Terence Lessa (PT, 2013-2016)

Area
  - Total: 1,740.087 km^{2} (671.851 sq mi)
- Elevation: 419 m (1,375 ft)

Population (2020)
  - Total: 27,003
  - Density: 15.518/km^{2} (40.192/sq mi)
- Demonym: ibotiramense
- Time zone: UTC−3 (BRT)
- Postal code: 47520

Ibotirama is a municipality located in the west of the state of Bahia, Brazil. It is in the micro-region of the lower-middle São Francisco River. This major river passes by the city where it is crossed by a recently constructed bridge. Ibotirama covers 1,740.087 km^{2} (671.851 mi^{2}), and has a population of 27,003 with a population density of 16 inhabitants per square kilometer. The municipality lies along the São Francisco River, a major inland water route and the fourth-longest river in Brazil.

== Geography ==
Its area is 1,740.087 km^{2} (671.851 mi^{2}) and it is limited on the north by the municipality of Morpará, on the south with the municipality of Paratinga, on the east with the municipality of Oliveira dos Brejinhos and on the west with the municipality of Muquém do São Francisco.

Ibotirama is crossed by Br-242, which connects Brasília to Salvador and Ba 162, connecting with Bom Jesus da Lapa.

The distance between the city and the state capital is 668 kilometres (415 mi). The average distance between neighboring cities is 100 km. The average time taken to go from the villages to the municipal center is 20 with people coming by bus, automobile, truck, boat, cart, horse, bicycle, and on foot.

=== Climate ===
Ibotirama is hot and semi-arid with dry winds during the dry season becoming aggravated during the months of August and September. The rainy season is from November to March. In this season the climate is wet and hot, and feels uncomfortable. The average temperature varies between 35° and 45°. Due to the soft breeze that comes with the dry season the climate becomes more agreeable, especially at night. The average rainfall varies between 500 and 600 mm.

The flora of the region is known as Caatinga, which is characterized by sparse, stunted, thorny and drought-resistant vegetation. Trees, leafless for long periods and able to resist drought, also are characteristic, particularly in the basin of the São Francisco River. There is also Cerrado in some parts of the municipality, which is characterised by low-lying vegetation and trees like the umbuzeiro, the aroeira, the xique-xique, the juruma preta, the umburana de cheiro, the mandacaru, the palma e other cacti that store water in their leaves and stems, which serve as food for the cattle and also for the population, mainly in the dry season.

The fauna of the region is made up mainly of parakeets and doves. There are also parrots, owls, hawks, and emas. Mammals are rare but there are still wildcats, wilddogs, sagui monkeys, sloths, skunks, deer, capivara and bats. The onça, or jaguar, is also still found in reduced numbers.

== Economy ==
The first industries began with sugar mills to produce molasses and stills to produce rum. There were also small factories making manioc flour, cheese, carnauba wax, babaça palm oil, bricks and roof tiles.

Present-day Ibotirama has five brick factories, two rice mills, one quarry, five small ironworks, five sawmills, a broom factory, a mineral water bottler, and three furniture factories.

Agriculture is the main economic activity. Main crops planted during the rainy season are: tobacco, beans, corn, manioc, pumpkin, sesame, sugarcane and grass. The plants develop quickly due to the constant heat of the region.

There is also fishing on the river with over six thousand fishermen registered with the government.

== History ==
The area was once inhabited by Tupi-Guarani Indians who had their fishing camp here. In the eighteenth century settlers began to arrive to start cattle ranching. A settlement was formed to supply muleteers and cattle drivers and fishermen began to settle to take advantage of the vast fishing in the river. In 1911, the village was elevated to the district of Piratinga and in 1931 it became a vila with the name of Jardinópolis. In 1943, the name was changed to Ibotirama. It was only in 1958 that it became a city.

Economic growth occurred when the important Brasília-Salvador highway was built, making Ibotirama an obligatory stopover for travelers and truck drivers on the long and tiring journey.
