= Gentio do Ouro =

Municipality of Bahia State, Brazil

- Municipality
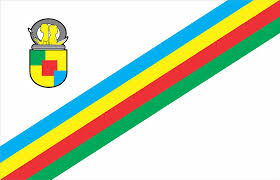
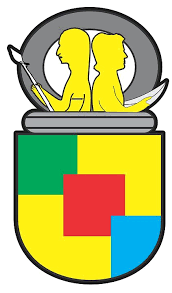
- Flag Coat of arms

- Location in Brazil
- Coordinates: 11°25′S 42°30′W
- Country: Brazil
- Region: Nordeste
- State: Bahia

Population (2020)
  - Total: 11,259
- Time zone: UTC−3 (BRT)
- Famous places/ attractions Estadio Municipal Aeroporto de Gentio do Ouro Tanque Paraginha

Gentio do Ouro is a municipality in the state of Bahia in the North-East region of Brazil.

== See also ==
- List of municipalities in Bahia
