= Passagem Franca do Piauí =

Coordinates: 5.85778°S 42.44°W

- Municipality
- Country: Brazil
- Region: Nordeste
- State: Piauí
- Mesoregion: Centro-Norte Piauiense

Population (2020)
  - Total: 4,323
- Time zone: UTC−3 (BRT)

Passagem Franca do Piauí is a municipality in the state of Piauí in the Northeast region of Brazil.

== See also ==
- List of municipalities in Piauí
