= Formosa do Rio Preto =

Municipality of Bahia, Brazil

- Municipality
- The Municipality of Formosa do Rio Preto
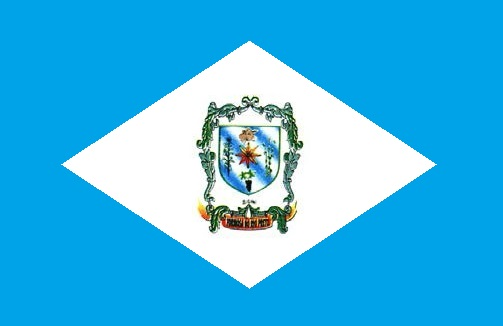
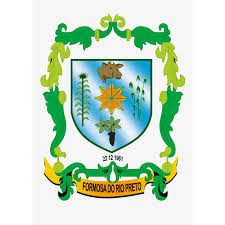
- Flag Coat of arms

- Localization of the city
- Coordinates: 11°02′52″S 45°11′34″W
- Country: Brazil
- Region: Northeast
- State: Bahia
- Founded: December 22, 1961

Government
  - Mayor: Manoel Afonso de Araujo (PMN)

Area
  - Total: 16,185.171 km^{2} (6,249.129 sq mi)

Population (2020)
  - Total: 25,857
  - Density: 1.3/km^{2} (3.4/sq mi)
- Time zone: UTC−3 (BRT)
  - Summer (DST): UTC11° 02' 52" S 45° 11' 34" O
- HDI (2000): 0.646 – medium

Formosa do Rio Preto is the westernmost and largest (by area) city in the Brazilian state of Bahia. It is also the largest in all Northeastern Brazil.

The municipality contains part of the 707,079 hectares (1,747,230 acres) Serra Geral do Tocantins Ecological Station, a strictly protected conservation unit created in 2001 to preserve an area of cerrado. It also contains part of the 724,324 hectares (1,789,840 acres) Nascentes do Rio Parnaíba National Park, created in 2002.

== See also ==
- List of municipalities in Bahia
