= Barra do Choça =

Municipality of Bahia, Brazil

Coordinates: 14.8808°S 40.5789°W

- Municipality
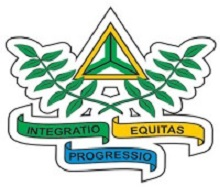
- Flag
- Interactive map of Barra do Choça
- Country: Brazil
- Region: Nordeste
- State: Bahia

Population (2020)
  - Total: 31,209
- Time zone: UTC−3 (BRT)

Barra do Choça is a municipality in the state of Bahia in the North-East region of Brazil.

== See also ==
- List of municipalities in Bahia
