= Cumaru do Norte =

Coordinates: 7.825°S 50.7728°W

- Municipality
- Interactive map of Cumaru do Norte
- Country: Brazil
- Region: Northern
- State: Pará
- Mesoregion: Sudeste Paraense

Population (2020)
  - Total: 13,761
- Time zone: UTC−3 (BRT)

Cumaru do Norte is a municipality in the state of Pará in the North Region of Brazil.

== See also ==
- List of municipalities in Pará
