= Itaúna do Sul =

Coordinates: 22°40′S 52°49′W

- Municipality
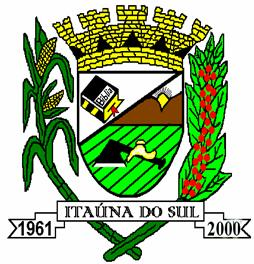
- Flag Coat of arms

- Country: Brazil
- Region: Southern
- State: Paraná
- Mesoregion: Noroeste Paranaense

Population (2020)
  - Total: 2,781
- Time zone: UTC−3 (BRT)

Itaúna do Sul is a municipality in the state of Paraná in the Southern Region of Brazil.

== See also ==
- List of municipalities in Paraná
