= Benedito Leite =

Coordinates: 7°13′S 44°34′W

- Municipality
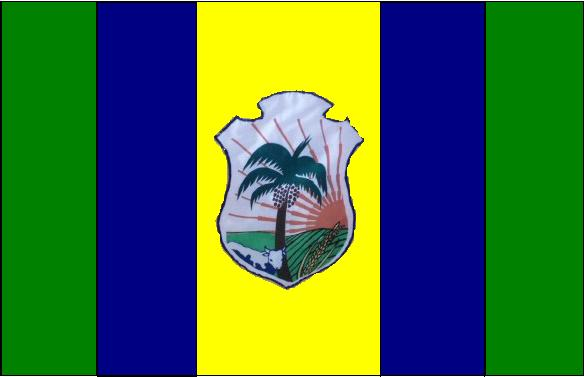
- Flag
- Interactive map of Benedito Leite
- Country: Brazil
- Region: Nordeste
- State: Maranhão
- Mesoregion: Sul Maranhense

Population (2020)
  - Total: 5,638
- Time zone: UTC−3 (BRT)

Benedito Leite is a municipality in the state of Maranhão in the Northeast region of Brazil.

== See also ==
- List of municipalities in Maranhão
