= Mariano Melgar Airport =

Airport in Peru

Mariano Melgar Airport La Joya Air Base
- IATA: none; ICAO: SPLC

Summary
- Airport type: Public
- Serves: La Joya District
- Elevation AMSL: 3,890 ft / 1,186 m
- Coordinates: 16°47′30″S 71°53′12″W

Map
- Location of the airport in Peru

Runways
Direction	Length		Surface
Direction	m	ft	Surface
17/35	4,000	13,123	Concrete, Asphalt
- Sources: GCM Google Maps

Mariano Melgar Airport (ICAO: SPLC) is an airport serving the agricultural district of La Joya in the Arequipa Region of Peru. It is named after Peruvian patriot Mariano Melgar. It also serves as the La Joya Air Base.

== See also ==
- Transport in Peru
- List of airports in Peru
