= Maracás =

Municipality of Bahia, Brazil

Coordinates: 13°26′S 40°27′W

- Municipality
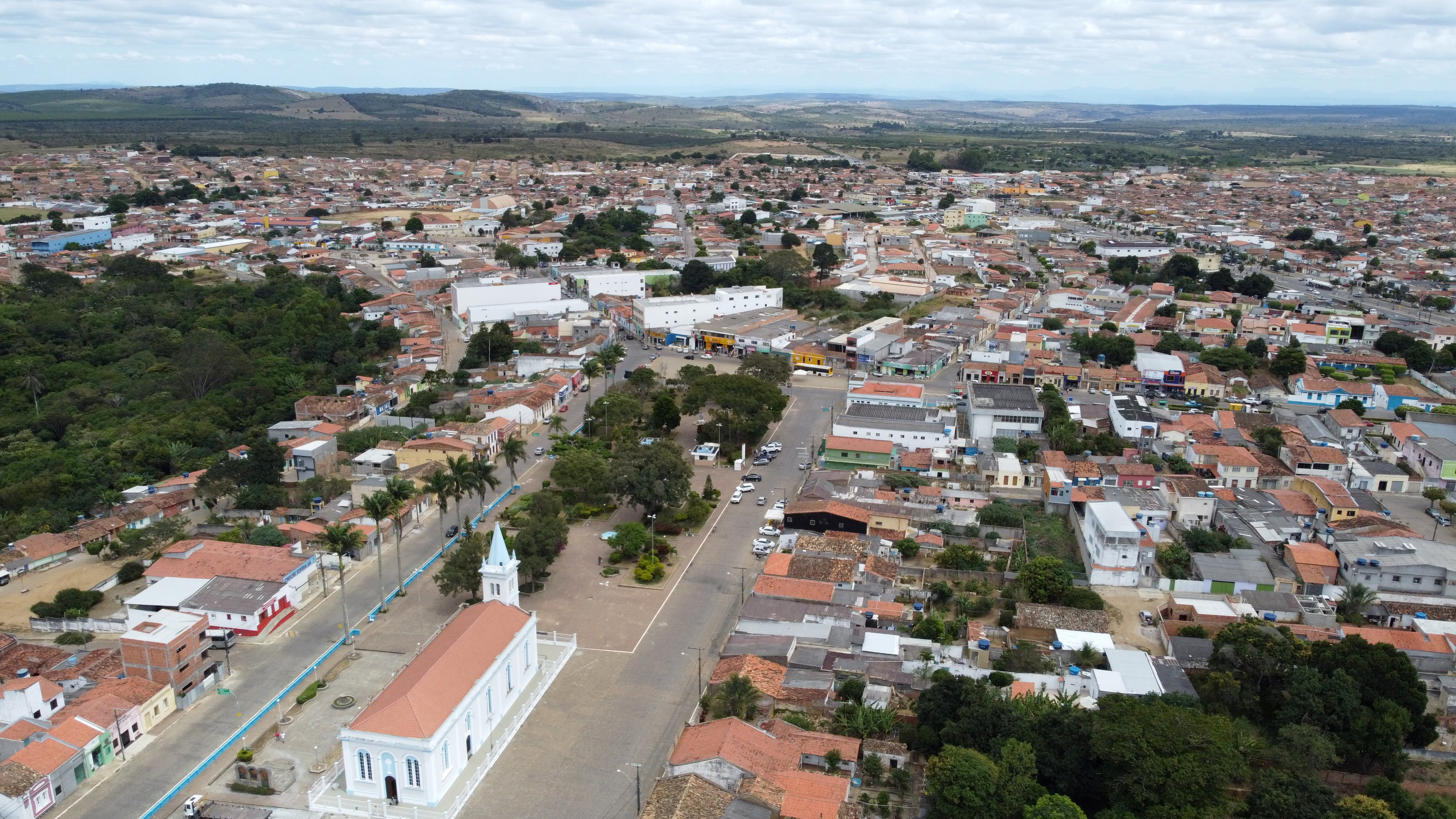

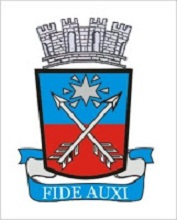
- Flag Coat of arms
- Interactive map of Maracás
- Country: Brazil
- Region: Nordeste
- State: Bahia

Population (2020)
  - Total: 20,393
- Time zone: UTC−3 (BRT)

Maracás is a municipality in the state of Bahia in the North-East region of Brazil.

== See also ==
- List of municipalities in Bahia
