= Querência do Norte =

- Municipality
- Flag Coat of arms

- Location in Brazil
- Coordinates: 23°05′02″S 53°29′02″W
- Country: Brazil
- Region: Southern
- State: Paraná
- Mesoregion: Noroeste Paranaense
- Founded: 1955

Area
  - Total: 914.764 km^{2} (353.192 sq mi)
- Elevation: 338 m (1,109 ft)

Population (2020)
  - Total: 12,232
  - Density: 13.372/km^{2} (34.633/sq mi)
- Time zone: UTC−3 (BRT)

Querência do Norte is a municipality in the state of Paraná in the Southern Region of Brazil.

== See also ==
- List of municipalities in Paraná
