= Juruti, Pará =

Juruti
- Municipality
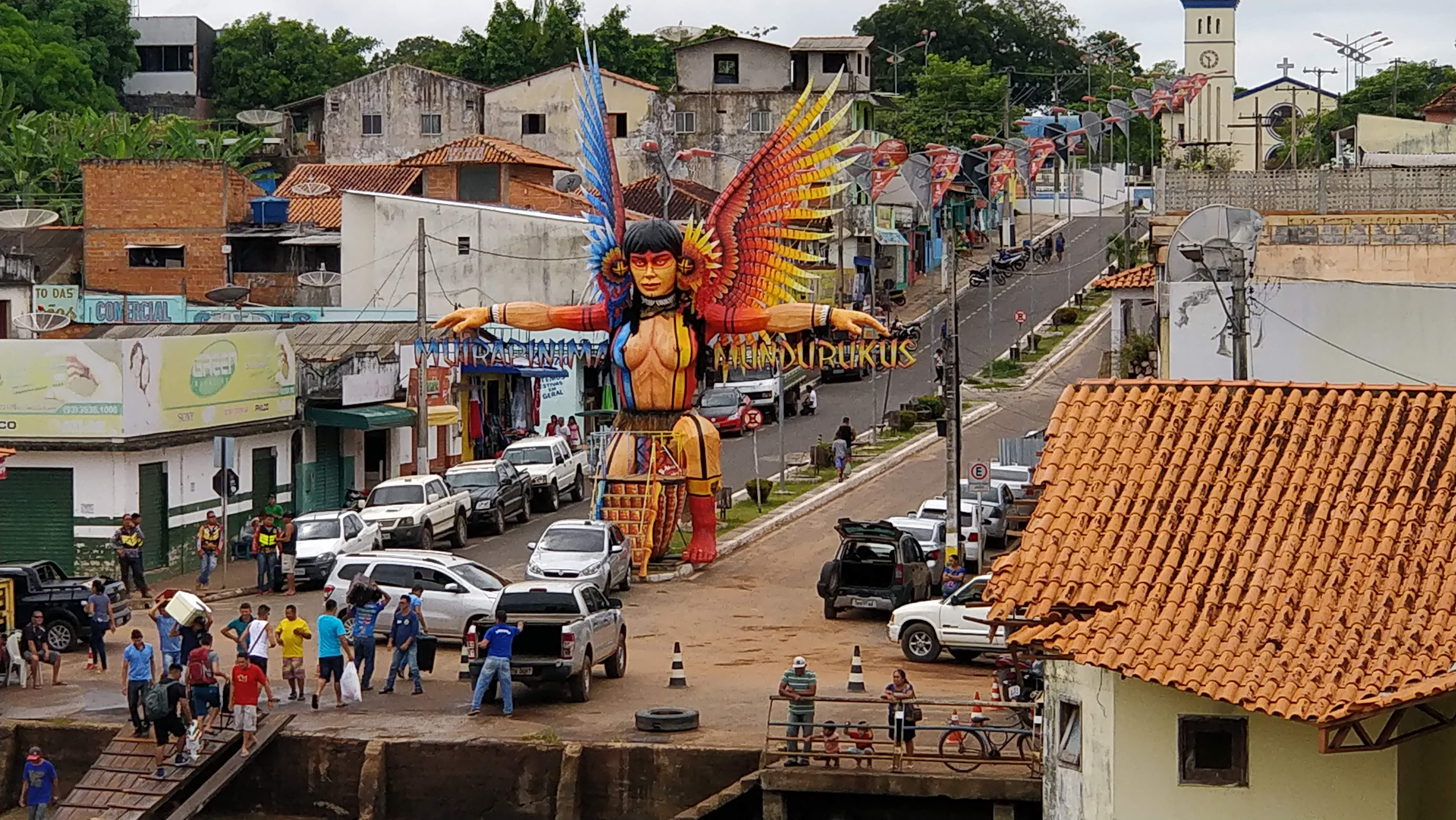

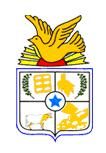
- Flag Coat of arms

- Coordinates: 02°09′08″S 56°05′32″W
- Country: Brazil
- Region: Northern
- State: Pará
- Mesoregion: Baixo Amazonas
- Established: 9 April 1883

Area
  - Total: 3,206.179 sq mi (8,303.966 km^{2})
- Elevation: 118 ft (36 m)

Population (2020)
  - Total: 58,960
  - Density: 12/sq mi (4.5/km^{2})
- Time zone: UTC−3 (BRT)

Juruti is a municipality in western Pará state, Brazil, on the Amazon River. This is the site of a new giant Alcoa bauxite mine that has changed the face of this previously neglected area.

The city is served by Juruti Airport.

== See also ==
- List of municipalities in Pará
