= Portel, Pará =

Portel
- Municipality
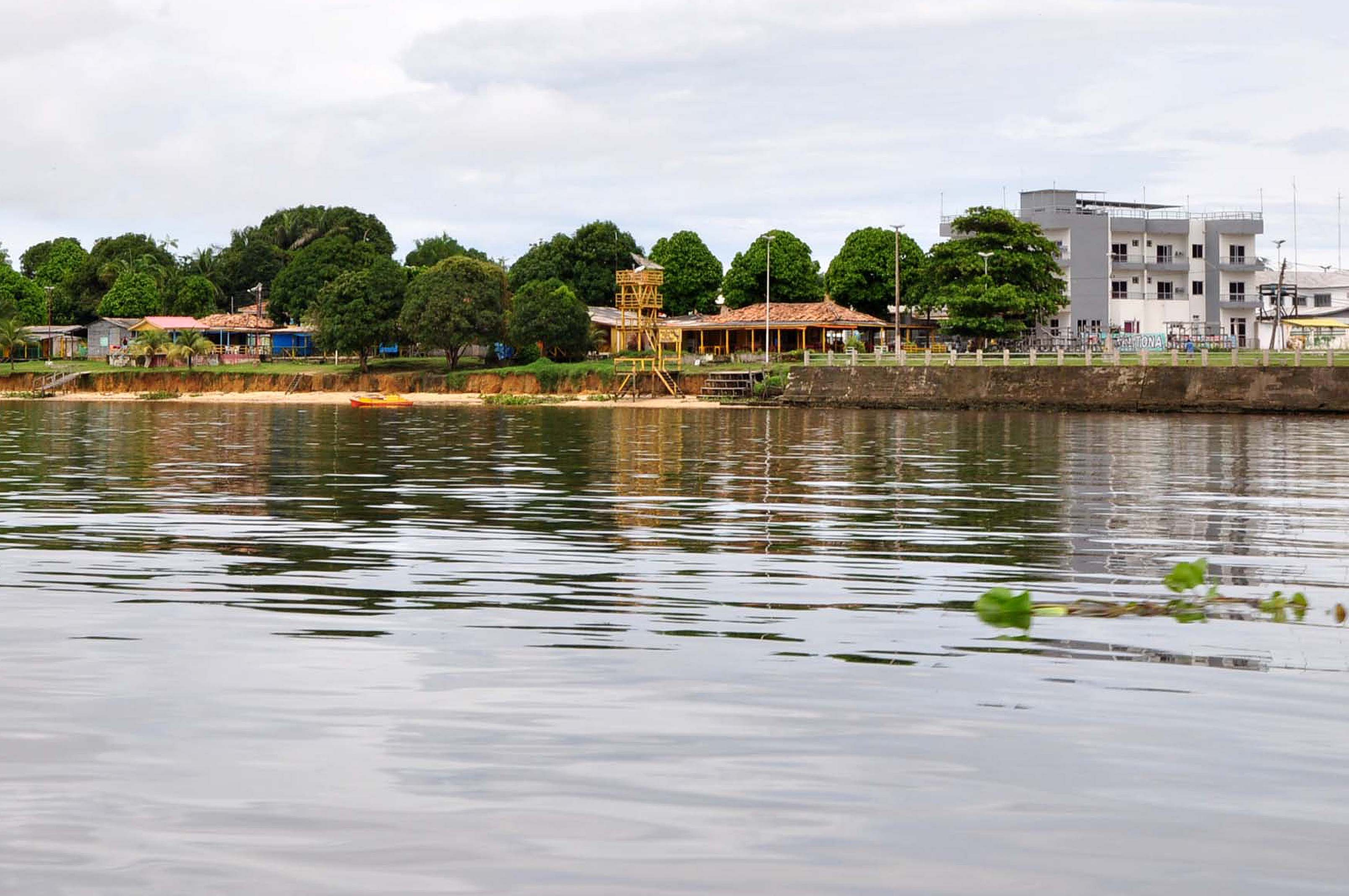

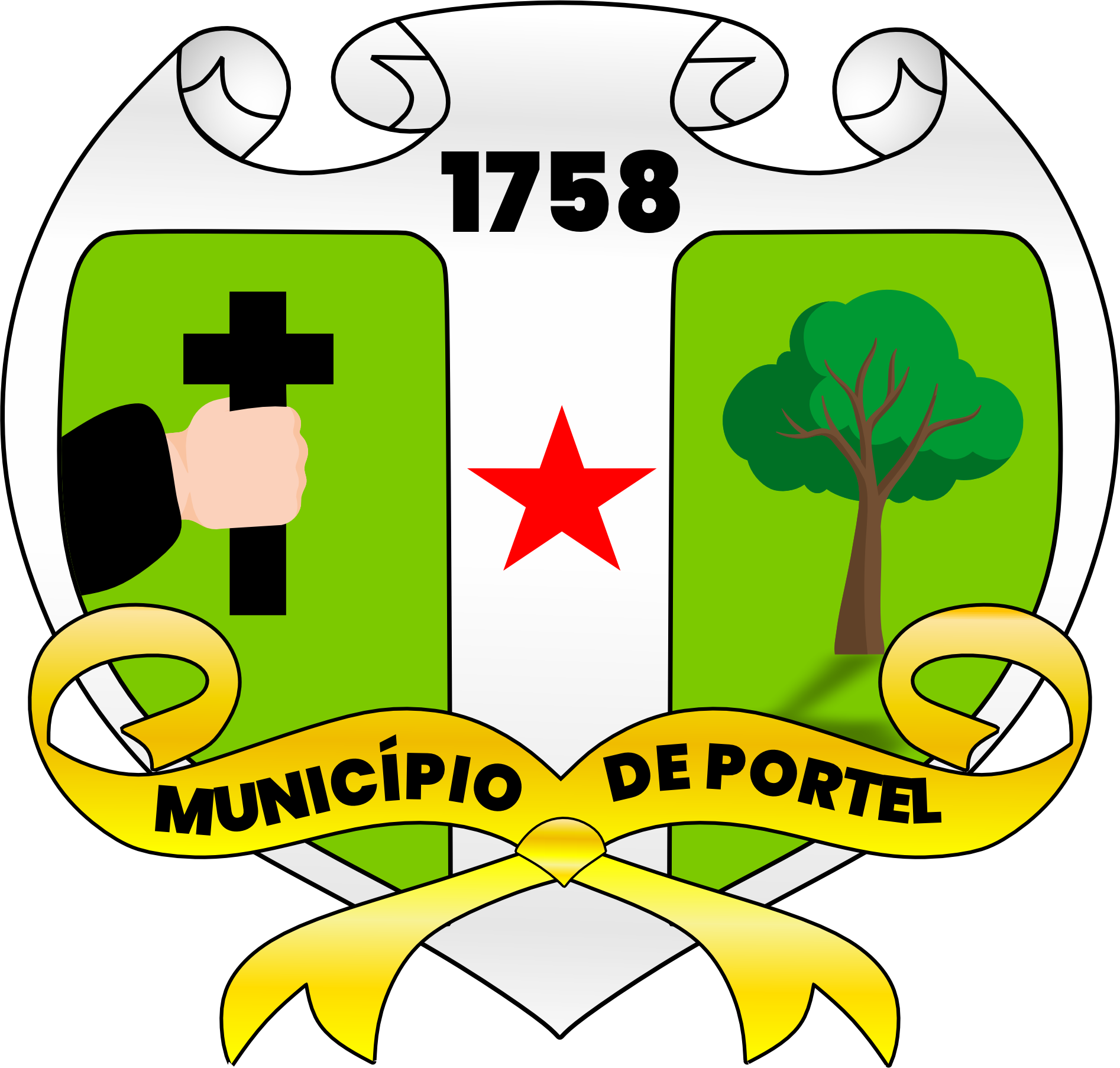
- Flag Coat of arms

- Location in the State of Pará
- Coordinates: 01°56′09″S 50°49′15″W
- Country: Brazil
- Region: North
- State: Pará

Area
  - Total: 25,384.779 km^{2} (9,801.118 sq mi)
- Elevation: 19 m (62 ft)

Population (2020)
  - Total: 62,945
  - Density: 1.7/km^{2} (4.4/sq mi)
- Time zone: UTC−3 (BRT)
- Postal Code: 68480-000
- HDI: 0.483 PNUD/2010
- GDP: R$ 440766.76
- GDP per capita: R$ 7705.04

Portel is a Brazilian municipality located in the state of Pará. Its population as of 2020 is estimated to be 62,945 people. The area of the municipality is 25,384.779 km^{2}. The city belongs to the mesoregion Marajó and to the microregion of Portel.

== See also ==
- List of municipalities in Pará
