= List of airports in Peru =

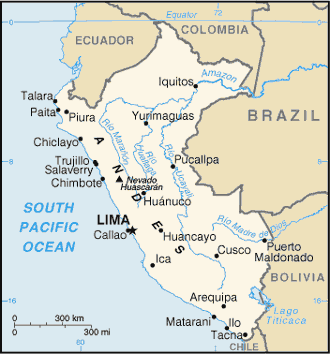
Map of Peru

This is a list of airports in Peru, sorted by location.

Peru, officially the Republic of Peru, is a country located in western South America. It is bordered in the north by Ecuador and Colombia, in the east by Brazil, in the southeast by Bolivia, in the south by Chile, and in the west by the Pacific Ocean.

The country is divided into 25 regions, which are subdivided into provinces and districts. Peru's capital city is Lima, located in the Lima Province (which is not part of any region).

== Airports ==
Of a total of 234 airports, this list contains Peru's 5 international airports with scheduled services, 20 domestic airports with scheduled services, 63 domestic airports without scheduled services, and 5 military airports, making a total of 93 main airports, of which 25 have scheduled commercial airlines services.

City served	Region	ICAO	IATA	Airport name
International airports featuring scheduled services (number of foreign destinations)
Chiclayo	Lambayeque	SPHI	CIX	FAP Captain José Abelardo Quiñones González International Airport (1)
Cusco	Cusco	SPZO	CUZ	Alejandro Velasco Astete International Airport (3)
Lima / Callao	Callao	SPJC	LIM	Jorge Chávez International Airport (46)
Trujillo	La Libertad	SPRU	TRU	Cap. FAP Carlos Martínez de Pinillos International Airport (1)
Domestic airports featuring scheduled services
Andoas	Loreto	SPAS		Alférez FAP Alfredo Vladimir Sara Bauer Airport
Anta / Huaraz	Ancash	SPHZ	ATA	Comandante FAP Germán Arias Graziani Airport
Arequipa	Arequipa	SPQU	AQP	Rodríguez Ballón International Airport
Atalaya	Ucayali	SPAY	AYX	Tnte. Gral. Gerardo Pérez Pinedo Airport
Ayacucho	Ayacucho	SPHO	AYP	Coronel FAP Alfredo Mendívil Duarte Airport
Caballococha	Loreto	SPBC	LHC	Caballococha Airport
Cajamarca	Cajamarca	SPJR	CJA	Mayor General FAP Armando Revoredo Iglesias Airport
Chachapoyas	Amazonas	SPPY	CHH	Chachapoyas Airport
Colonia Angamos	Loreto	SPDN		Colonia Angamos Airport
Contamana	Loreto	SPCM	CTF	Contamana Airport
San Antonio del Estrecho	Loreto	SPEE		El Estrecho Airport
Güeppi	Loreto	SPGP		Güeppi Airport
Huánuco	Huánuco	SPNC	HUU	Alférez FAP David Figueroa Fernandini Airport
Iquitos	Loreto	SPQT	IQT	Coronel FAP Francisco Secada Vignetta International Airport
Jaén	Cajamarca	SPJE	JAE	Jaén Airport
Jauja	Junín	SPJJ	JAU	Francisco Carle Airport
Juanjuí	San Martín	SPJI	JJI	Juanjuí Airport
Juliaca	Puno	SPJL	JUL	Inca Manco Cápac International Airport
Mazamari	Junín	SPMF	MZA	Mayor Pnp Nancy Flore Airport
Piura	Piura	SPUR	PIU	Cap. FAP Guillermo Concha Iberico International Airport
Pucallpa	Ucayali	SPCL	PCL	FAP Captain David Abensur Rengifo International Airport
Puerto Maldonado	Madre de Dios	SPTU	PEM	Padre Aldamiz International Airport
Rio Santiago	Amazonas			Galilea Airport
Rioja	San Martín	SPJA	RIJ	Juan Simons Vela Airport
Rodríguez de Mendoza	Amazonas	SPLN	RIM	San Nicolas Airport
San Lorenzo	Loreto	SPQM		San Lorenzo Airport
Santa Maria de Nieva	Amazonas	SPAC		Ciro Alegria Airport
Tacna	Tacna	SPTN	TCQ	Crnl. FAP Carlos Ciriani Santa Rosa International Airport
Talara	Piura	SPYL	TYL	Cap. FAP Victor Montes Arias Airport
Tarapoto	San Martín	SPST	TPP	Cad. FAP Guillermo del Castillo Paredes Airport
Tingo María	Huánuco	SPGM	TGI	Tingo María Airport
Tumbes	Tumbes	SPME	TBP	Cap. FAP Pedro Canga Rodríguez Airport
Yurimaguas	Loreto	SPMS	YMS	Moisés Benzaquén Rengifo Airport
Domestic airports without scheduled services
Alerta	Ucayali	SPAR	ALD	Alerta Airport
Andahuaylas	Apurímac	SPHY	ANS	Andahuaylas Airport
Atico District	Arequipa	SPOY		Atico Airport
Breu	Ucayali	SPPB		Tipishsa Airport
Cajabamba	Cajamarca	SPJB		Pampa Grande Airport
Chimbote	Ancash	SPEO	CHM	Tnte. FAP Jaime Montreuil Morales Airport
Ciudad Constitución	Pasco	SPCC		Ciudad Constitución Airport
Corrientes	Loreto	SPDR		Trompeteros Airport
Cuajone	Moquegua	SPDS		Cuajone Botiflaca Airport
Espinar	Cusco	SPIY		Yauri Airport
Huamachuco	La Libertad			Huamachuco Airport
Iberia	Madre de Dios	SPBR	IBP	Iberia Airport
Ica	Ica	SPLH		Las Dunas Airport
Ilo	Moquegua	SPLO	ILQ	Ilo Airport
Iñapari	Madre de Dios	SPIN		Iñapari Airport
Jeberos	Loreto	SPBS		Bellavista Airport
Kiteni	Cusco	SPQI/SPKI		Kiteni Airport
Las Malvinas	Cusco	SPWT	VVN	Las Malvinas/Echarate Airport
Manú	Madre de Dios	SPNU		Manú Airport
Pampa Melchorita (Cañete)	Lima	SPRR		Revalora Aerodrome
Mollebamba	La Libertad	SPTO		Tulpo Airport
Mollendo	Arequipa	SPDO		Mollendo Airport
Moquegua	Moquegua	SPEQ		Cesar Torque Podesta Airport
Moyobamba	San Martín	SPBB	MBP	Moyobamba Airport
Nazca	Ica	SPZA	NZC	Maria Reiche Neuman Airport
Nuevo Mundo	Cusco	SPNM		Nuevo Mundo Airport
Orcopampa	Arequipa	SPOR		Orcopampa Airport
Pacasmayo	La Libertad	SPYO		Pacasmayo Airport
Pataz	La Libertad	SPGL		Chagual Airport
Pias	La Libertad	SPIS		Pias Airport
Pisco	Ica	SPSO	PIO	Capitán FAP Renán Elías Olivera Airport
Punta Sal / Máncora	Tumbes	SPWB	PTL	Walter Braedt Segú Aerodrome
Esperanza	Ucayali	SPEP		Puerto Esperanza Airport
Quince Mil	Cusco	SPIL	UMI	Quince Mil Airport
Quiruvilca	La Libertad	SPGA		Pata de Gallo Airport
Requena	Loreto	SPQN	REQ	Requena Airport
San Ramón	Junín	SPRM		Capitán FAP Leonardo Alvariño Herr Airport
San Rafael	Puno	SPRF		San Rafael Airport
San Bartolo / Lima	Lima	SPLX		Lib Mandy Metropolitano Airport
Santa Maria	Lima	SPMR	SMG	Santa Maria Airport
Santa Rosa	Ayacucho			Palmapampa Airport
Saposoa	San Martín	SPOA		Saposoa Airport
Satipo	Junín	SPIP	SFK	Satipo Airport
Sepahua	Ucayali	SPSE		Sepahua Airport
Tahuanía	Ucayali	SPBL		Bolognesi Airport
Tocache	San Martín	SPCH	TCG	Tocache Airport
Tocache	San Martín	SPPN		Palmas Del Espino Airport
Toquepala	Tacna	SPTQ		Toquepala Airport
Uchiza	San Martín	SPIZ	UCZ	Uchiza Airport
Vicco	Pasco	SPVI		Vicco Airport
Vilcashuamán	Ayacucho	SPVN		Vilcashuamán Airport
Vitor	Arequipa	SPVT		Mayor FAP Guillermo Protset del Castillo Airport
Military airports
Lima	Lima	SPLP		Las Palmas Air Base
Iquitos	Loreto	SPID		Teniente Bergerie airport
La Joya	Arequipa	SPLC		La Joya Air Base
Talara	Piura	SPTP		El Pato Air Base
San Juan de Marcona	Ica	SPJN	SJA	San Juan de Marcona Airport
Proposed airports
Chinchero	Cusco			Chinchero International Airport

== See also ==
- Transport in Peru
- List of airports by ICAO code: S#SP - Peru
- Wikipedia: WikiProject Aviation/Airline destination lists: South America#Peru
