= Faucett Perú =

Peruvian airline

Compañía de Aviación Faucett

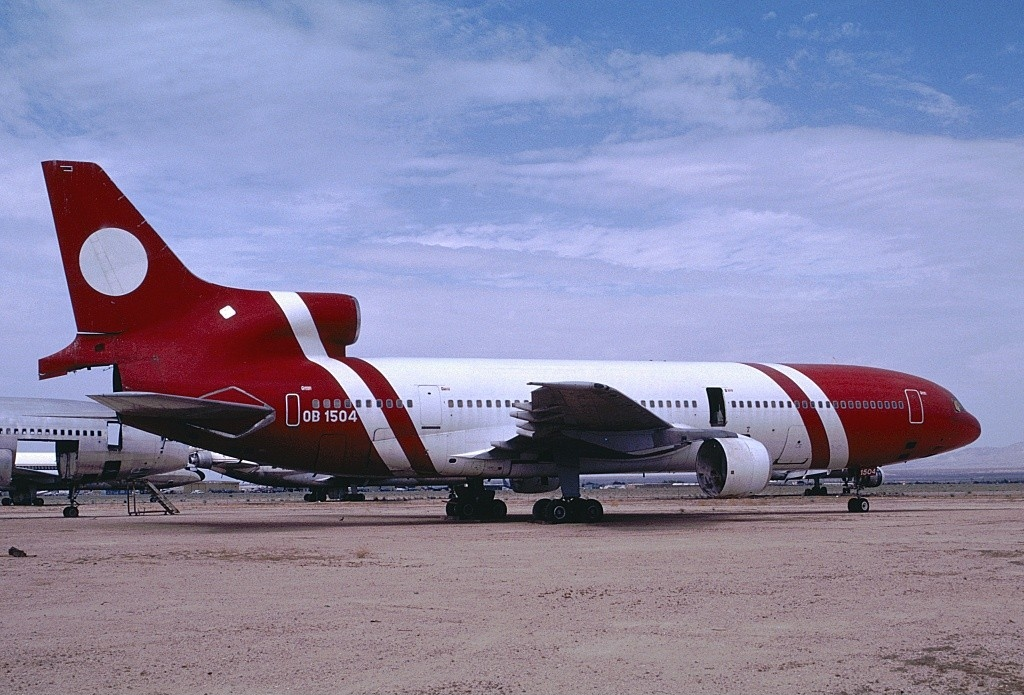
IATA	ICAO	Call sign
CF	CFP	FAUCETT
- Founded: 15 September 1928
- Commenced operations: 27 September 1928
- Ceased operations: 3 December 1997
- Hubs: Jorge Chávez International Airport
- Destinations: 17 (at the time of closure)
- Headquarters: Jorge Chávez International Airport, Lima, Peru
- Key people: Elmer J. Faucett

Compañía de Aviación Faucett, colloquially known simply as Faucett Perú or Faucett, was a Peruvian airline. Its headquarters were located on the premises of Jorge Chávez International Airport in Lima.

== History ==
=== Beginnings ===
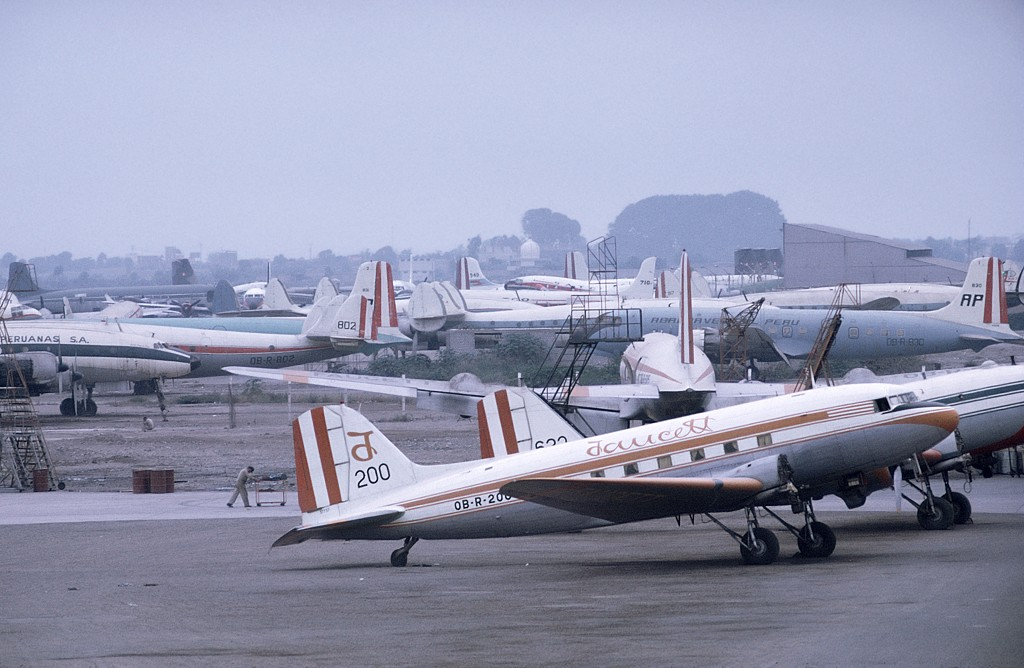
Douglas DC-3 of Faucett at Lima Airport, Peru, in 1972

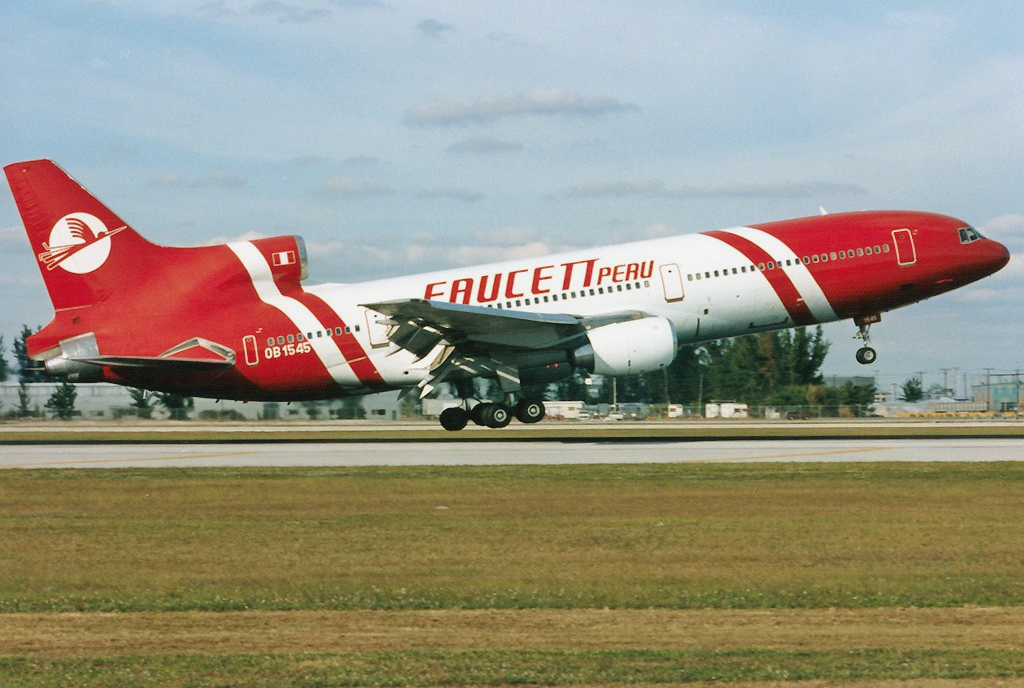
A Faucett Lockheed L-1011-1 at Miami International Airport in 1996.

Elmer J. Faucett had been sent to Peru as a representative of the Curtiss Export Company, arriving in the country from the United States in 1920. In 1928, he and a group of Peruvian business men joined to found the first commercial airline in Peru, and one of the first in Latin America. With an initial investment of £2,500, the company was formed on 15 September 1928, and started operations on 27 September that year. In 1937, the airline absorbed Compañía de Aviación Peruana SA from Panagra. At April 1938, the route network was flown with seven planes manufactured by the Stinson Aircraft Company, and included Chiclayo, Ica, Lima, Sabados and Talara.

=== Postwar operations (1945–1960) ===
Having their initial investment increased to £200,000 by 1943, Elmer Faucett bought a large number of aircraft from the United States in 1945.

By May 1952, the airline flew a route network that was 3,000 miles (4,800 km) long. Faucett carried 136,456 passengers in 1955, and at year end the company had 307 employees.

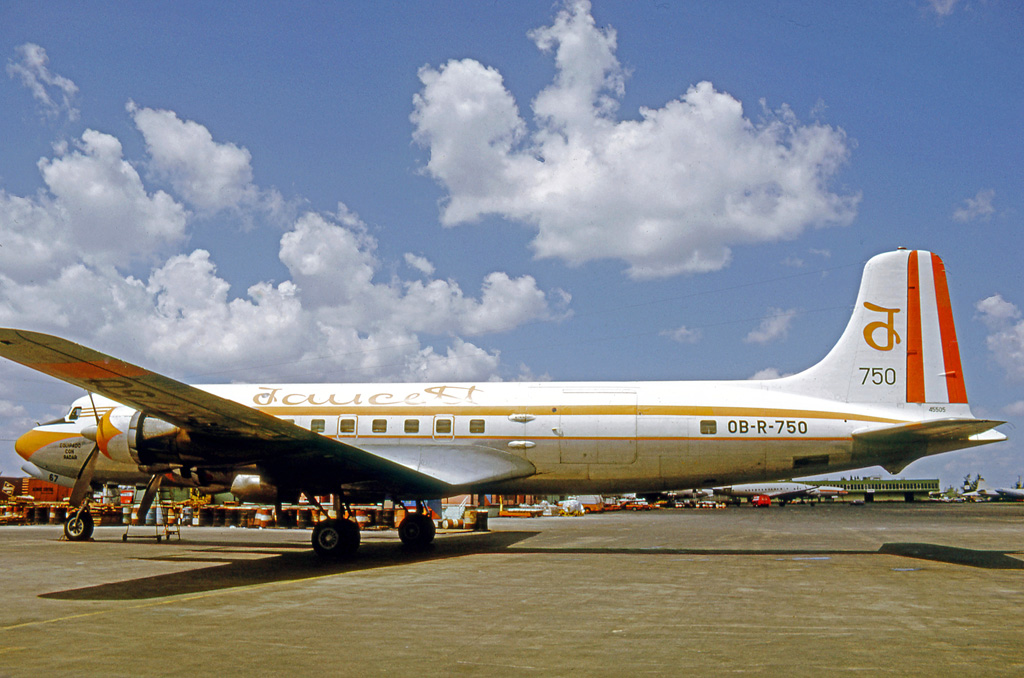
Faucett Douglas DC-6B(F) in 1972 fitted with large rear cargo door for freight operations

By March 1960, the airline had a fleet of eight DC-3s, four DC-4s and four Faucett Stinson F-19s to serve a route network that was 6,368 miles (10,248 km) long. A second-hand Douglas DC-6B acquired from Panagra was incorporated into the fleet in the early 1960s. Another DC-6B was acquired in late 1964, and was converted to DC-6B(F) standard with a large rear freight door. This was operated on cargo services to Miami, Florida.

=== 1970s–1980s ===
In 1973, Faucett was owned by Peruvian interests (46%), the Fundación Faucett (35%) and Braniff International Airways (19%). The cargo-only airline Aeronaves del Peru became Faucett's biggest shareholder in 1982.

=== 1990s: Decline and final years ===
The 1990s economic liberalization under Alberto Fujimori, after years of economic and political chaos (as well as a violent Maoist insurgency), brought a series of measures aimed at the privatization and deregulation of the airline market. A series of short-lived airlines, in the style of Russian Babyflots, sprang up during this decade. State-owned Aeroperú was partly sold to Mexican investors, and the rise of low-fare Aero Continente as the biggest domestic airline contributed to the slow decline of Faucett. A series of high-profile accidents, especially Faucett Perú Flight 251 and Aeroperú Flight 603 (both in 1996) affected the safety reputation of the Peruvian airline industry, with the US Embassy in Lima banning their employees from flying on Aero Continente and, more broadly, advising caution to US citizens flying on Peru's airlines.

In the end, problems with the economic-financial structure of the airline (with debts even with CORPAC for airport services), forced it to cease operations on 3 December 1997. Despite claiming that the 45-day closure would be temporary until government approval, all 1,250 employees were dismissed. Faucett incurred over US$1 million in debt. By 1998, the former directors and employees were engaged in legal battles over labor and management issues, as well as accusations over bankrupting the company. The airline was liquidated in 1999.

== Destinations ==
Faucett Perú served the following destinations:

^{†}	Hub
^{‡}	Focus city
^{#}	Destination served at the time of closure

Country (State/Province)	City	Airport	Refs
Peru	Arequipa ^{#}	Rodríguez Ballón International Airport	
Peru	Ayacucho ^{#}	Coronel FAP Alfredo Mendívil Duarte Airport	
Peru	Cajamarca	Mayor General FAP Armando Revoredo Iglesias Airport	
Peru	Chiclayo ^{#}	FAP Captain José Abelardo Quiñones González International Airport	
Peru	Chimbote	Tnte. FAP Jaime Montreuil Morales Airport	
Peru	Cuzco ^{#}	Alejandro Velasco Astete International Airport	
Peru	Huánuco	Alférez FAP David Figueroa Fernandini Airport	
Peru	Iberia	Iberia Airport	
Peru	Ilo	Ilo Airport	
Peru	Iquitos ^{#}	Crnl. FAP Francisco Secada Vignetta International Airport	
Peru	Juliaca ^{#}	Inca Manco Cápac International Airport	
Peru	Lima ^{#}	Jorge Chávez International Airport ^{†}	
Peru	Mollendo	Mollendo Airport	
Peru	Moyobamba	Moyobamba Airport	
Peru	Piura ^{#}	Cap. FAP Guillermo Concha Iberico International Airport	
Peru	Pucallpa ^{#}	FAP Captain David Abenzur Rengifo International Airport	
Peru	Puerto Maldonado	Padre Aldamiz International Airport	
Peru	Quince Mil	Quince Mil Airport	
Peru	Rioja ^{#}	Juan Simons Vela Airport	
Peru	Tacna ^{#}	Crnl. FAP Carlos Ciriani Santa Rosa International Airport ^{‡}	
Peru	Talara ^{#}	Cap. FAP Víctor Montes Arias Airport	
Peru	Tarapoto ^{#}	Cad. FAP Guillermo del Castillo Paredes Airport	
Peru	Tingo María	Tingo María Airport	
Peru	Trujillo ^{#}	Cap. FAP Carlos Martínez de Pinillos International Airport	
Peru	Tumbes ^{#}	Cap. FAP Pedro Canga Rodríguez Airport	
Peru	Yurimaguas ^{#}	Moisés Benzaquén Rengifo Airport	
United States (Florida)	Miami ^{#}	Miami International Airport	

According to the February 15, 1985 edition of the Official Airline Guide (OAG), Faucett was also serving Owen Roberts International Airport on Grand Cayman in the Cayman Islands as an intermediate stop on its service between Lima and Miami.

== Fleet ==
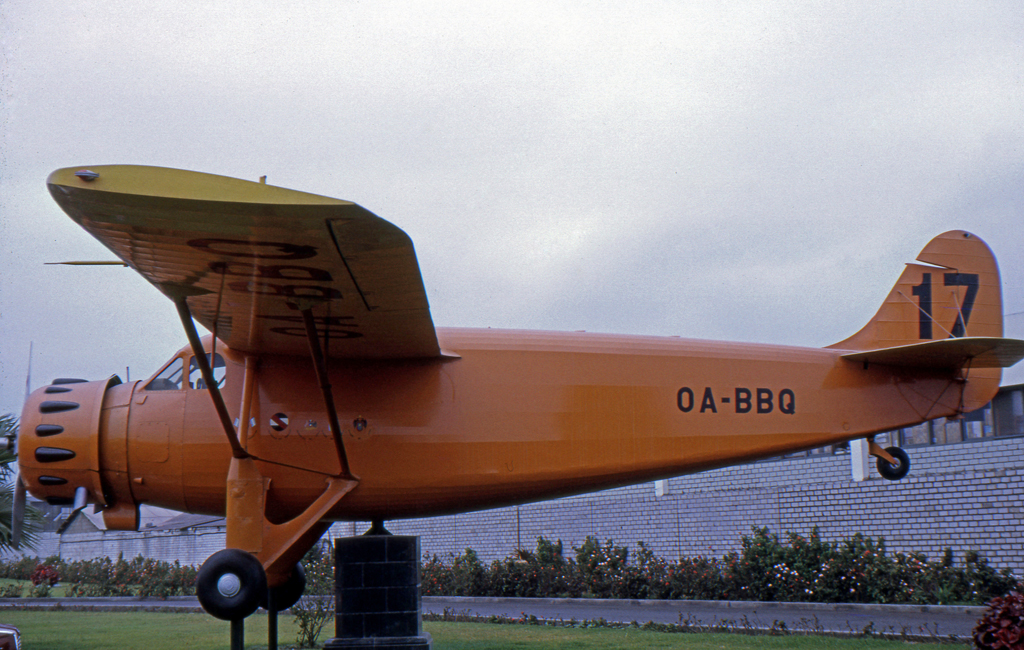
Faucett-Stinson F.19 cargo aircraft built by Faucett, exhibited at their base at Lima in April 1972

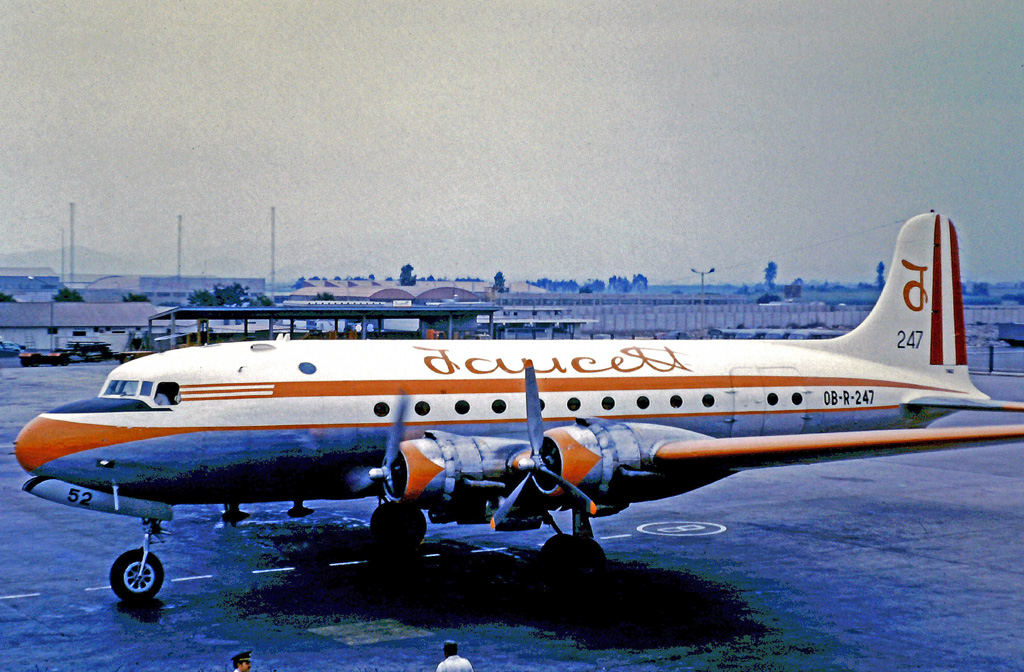
Douglas DC-4 of Faucett operating an internal Peruvian passenger service from Lima Airport in 1972

At March 1990, the airline had 1,300 employees and a fleet of ten aircraft that consisted of two Boeing 727-200s, one Boeing 737-100, four Boeing 737-200s and three McDonnell Douglas DC-8-50s.

Overall, Faucett Perú operated the following equipment at various times during its history:

Faucett Perú fleet
Aircraft	Total	Introduced	Retired	Notes
Airbus A300B4	4	1994	1995	
BAC One-Eleven 475	2	1971	1983	
BAC One-Eleven 500	1	1977	1982	
Boeing 707-320C	9	1978	1985	
Boeing 720	1	1980	1980	
Boeing 727-100	2	1968	1993	
Boeing 727-100C	3	1975	1987	
Boeing 727-200	3	1987	1997	One disappeared
Boeing 737-100	1	1988	1989	
Boeing 737-200	6	1982	1997	One written off as Flight 251
Douglas C-47 Skytrain	19	1946	1981	
Douglas C-54 Skymaster	8	1946	1981	
Douglas DC-6B	6	1960	1981	
Douglas DC-8-33F	1	1979	1980	Leased from Rich International
Douglas DC-8-43F	1	1984	1985	Leased from Aeronaves del Perú
Douglas DC-8-51	1	1986	1989	
Douglas DC-8-52	8	1982	1997	
Douglas DC-8-53F	1	1982	1990	
Douglas DC-8-61	1	1990	1991	
Douglas DC-8-62H	1	1995	1997	
Lockheed L-1011-1 TriStar	4	1991	1998	
Stinson Detroiter	7	1928	Unknown	
Faucett Stinson F-19	25	1929	Unknown	

== Incidents and accidents ==
- On 8 December 1967, a Faucett Douglas DC-4 airliner crashed into a mountain in the Andes at 10,470 feet, killing all 66 passengers and six crew.
- On 3 April 1989, Faucett 737-200, registered as OB-R-1314, veered off the runway while landing during a heavy tropical rainstorm at Iquitos Airport in Peru's Amazon region. There were no fatalities among the 130 passengers and crew, but 14 people were injured, and the aircraft was destroyed in the crash landing and its ensuing fire.
- On 11 September 1990, a Faucett Boeing 727-247 went missing some 180 miles southeast of Cape Race, Newfoundland. After having been leased to Air Malta, the aircraft was being returned to Peru from Europe via Iceland, when the crew reported a low fuel notice and that they were preparing to ditch. There were apparently zero survivors, as no bodies or wreckage were ever discovered.
- On 29 February 1996, Faucett Perú Flight 251, a Boeing 737 crashed in the mountains near Arequipa's airport, killing all 117 passengers and 6 crew aboard.

== See also ==
- List of airlines of Peru
- Transport in Peru
