= Expresso Aéreo =

Peruvian airline

IATA	ICAO	Call sign
-	-	-
- Founded: June 16, 1991
- Ceased operations: February 1997
- Fleet size: See Fleet below
- Headquarters: Lima, Peru

Expreso Aéreo was a small Peruvian regional airline based at Jorge Chávez International Airport. It was a passenger and cargo airline that operated from 1991 until 1996. It was one of several short-lived airlines that emerged and later folded in the first half of the 1990s following the deregulation of Peru's commercial aviation sector during the economic liberalization period of President Alberto Fujimori after the country's 1980s crisis.

== Accidents ==
- On September 10, 1992, Expresso Aéreo Flight 015, a Fokker F27-500 (reg. OB-1443), crashed in the airstrip of the remote Amazon jungle town of Bellavista. Due to a pilot error on approximation, possibly compounded by fatigue and the co-pilot's lack of experience, the plane hit the ground shortly before the runway threshold (practically crash-landing) and broke up in several parts, killing the pilot in the ensuing fire. The six remaining crew members and the 36 passengers managed to evacuate and survived, although some were injured.
- On February 25, 1994, Expresso Aéreo Flight 028, a Yakovlev Yak-40 struck Mount Carpish six minutes after leaving Tingo María for Lima, killing all 26 passengers and five crew members. The recently-delivered aircraft was reportedly piloted by two Russians and one Peruvian; Martín Perochena, son of the airline's CEO.

== Destinations ==
- Jorge Chávez International Airport, Lima
- Alejandro Velasco Astete International Airport, Cuzco
- Crnl. FAP Francisco Secada Vignetta International Airport, Iquitos
- Alférez FAP David Figueroa Fernandini Airport, Huánuco
- Cad. FAP Guillermo del Castillo Paredes Airport, Tarapoto
- Uchiza Airport, Uchiza
- Chachapoyas Airport, Chachapoyas
- Moyobamba Airport, Moyobamba
- Bellavista Airstrip, Bellavista
- Tingo María Airport, Tingo María
- Juanjuí Airport, Juanjuí
- Tocache Airport, Tocache

== Fleet ==
- Antonov An-24
- Antonov An-32
- Boeing 727-200
- Fokker F27
- Yakovlev Yak-40
