= Expresso Aéreo Flight 028 =

1994 aviation accident in Peru

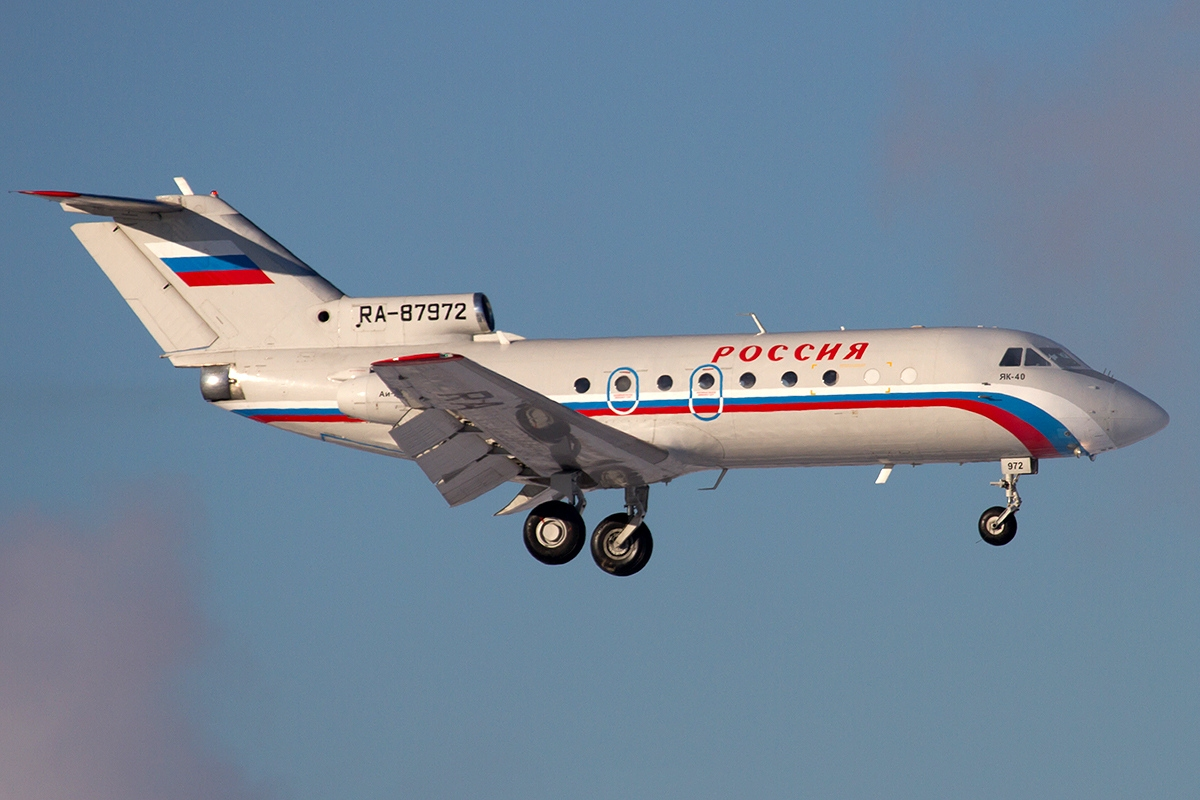
- A Yak-40 of Rossiya Airlines, similar to the one involved

Accident
- Date: 25 February 1994
- Summary: Controlled flight into terrain
- Site: Mount Carpish, Huánuco, Peru

Aircraft
- Aircraft type: Yakovlev Yak-40
- Operator: Expreso Aéreo
- IATA flight No.: 9D028
- ICAO flight No.: EPR028
- Call sign: EXPRESSO PERU 028
- Registration: OB-1559
- Flight origin: Juanjuí Airport, Juanjuí
- 1st stopover: Tocache Airport, Tocache
- Last stopover: Tingo María Airport, Tingo María
- Destination: Jorge Chávez International Airport, Lima
- Occupants: 31
- Passengers: 26
- Crew: 5
- Fatalities: 31
- Survivors: 0

Expresso Aéreo Flight 028 (9D028/EPR028) was a domestic flight from Juanjuí to Lima, with scheduled stopovers at Tocache and Tingo María. On 25 February 1994, the Yakovlev Yak-40 with 31 occupants onboard, operating the flight, collided with Mount Carpish after taking off from Tingo María Airport, killing all 31 onboard.

== Aircraft ==
The aircraft involved was a Yak-40 with serial number 9640251. It was manufactured in December 1976 and was operated under Aeroflot (registration CCCP-88233) from January 1977. After the fall of the USSR, the airliner was transferred to the Russian airline of Cheremshanka. The aircraft finally went to Expresso Aéreo on 17 February 1994 as OB-1559.

== Occupants ==
Nationalities of occupants
Nation	Occupants
Peruvian	29
Russian	2

The crew consisted of three Peruvians and two Russians. The pilot and flight engineer were Russian. The first officer of the flight was the son of the airline’s CEO, Martín Perochena.

== Accident ==
The aircraft took off from Tingo María Airport and climbed to 13,000 feet. Six minutes later, the aircraft collided with the slope of Mount Carpish and exploded. The crash happened during a day of bad weather, with heavy rain and dense fog leading to reduced visibility. The plane reportedly crashed into a particular elevation called "Tres Alcantarillas." The wreckage was located 45 kilometers southwest of the airport and spread over 660 feet. Air Force pilots found the aircraft, leading to 35 climbers discovering the wreckage of the aircraft on March 5th in an isolated area.

== Aftermath ==
The investigation by Peru’s Commission for the Investigation of Aviation Accidents was unable to conclude the cause of the incident due to the location of the wreckage. However, the crash is reported to have effectively ended commercial air links between Tingo María and Lima until LC Perú resumed the route in 2012.

== See also ==
- List of accidents and incidents involving the Yakovlev Yak-40
- Aeroflot Flight Sh-4
- Aeroflot Flight Sh-88
