= SPCH =

SPCH may refer to:

- speechless
- ICAO code for Tocache Airport
- Space Pirate Captain Harlock

== See also ==
- SPCH1
- SPCHS (disambiguation)
