= SPQR (disambiguation) =

SPQR is Senātus Populusque Rōmānus, Latin for the government of the ancient Roman Republic.

SPQR may also refer to:

== Arts and entertainment ==
- SPQR, novel by Paul Hyde Bonner (1952)
- SPQR series, a collection of detective stories set in the time of the Roman Republic
- SPQR: The Empire's Darkest Hour, a computer adventure game set in Ancient Rome
- SPQR (board game), a board wargame
- Steve Perrin's Quest Rules, a generic role-playing game system
- S.P.Q.R.: 2,000 and a Half Years Ago (1994), an Italian comedy film
- S.P.Q.R., a track on the album Deceit by experimental rock band This Heat
- S. P. Q. R., a record label distributed by London Records

== Non-fiction ==
- SPQR: A History of Ancient Rome, a 2015 book by Mary Beard

== Science and technology ==
- SPQR tree, a data structure for graph connectivity and planar embeddings
- Small Payload Quick Return, a NASA Ames program for "de-orbiting" small payloads

== Other uses ==
- Quiruvilca Airport (ICAO code), a defunct airport in Peru
- Sebastian Patrick Quintus Rahtz (1955–2016), British digital humanities information professional
