= 1967 Cordillera Carpish Faucett Perú Douglas C-54 crash =

1967 aviation accident in Peru

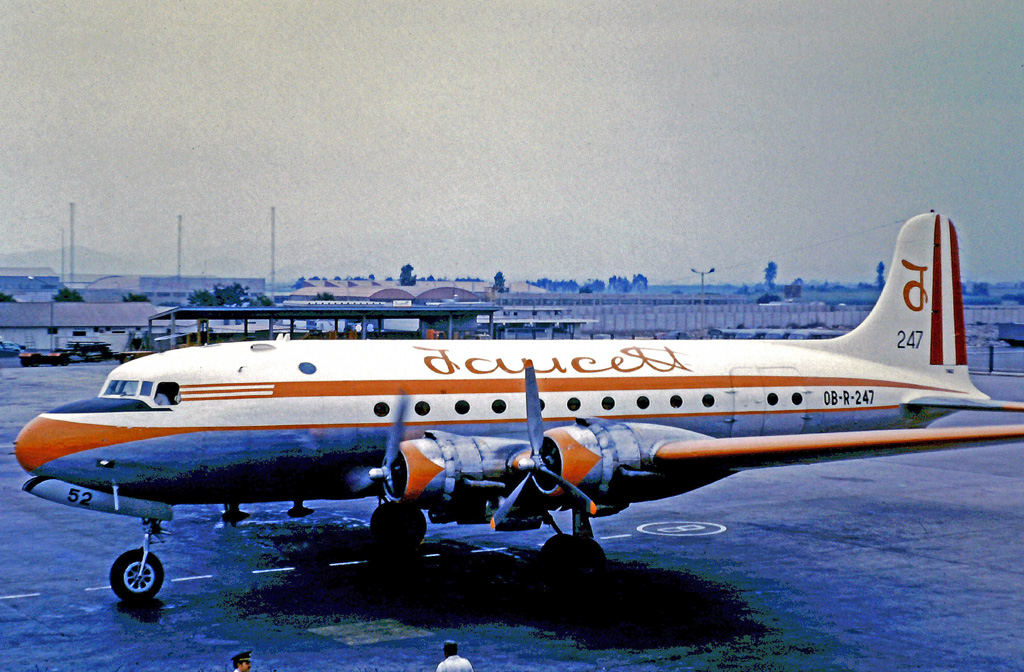
- Similar Peruvian airplane as the involved airplane

Accident
- Date: 8 December 1967
- Summary: Controlled flight into terrain
- Site: Cordillera de Carpish, Peru

Aircraft
- Aircraft type: Douglas C-54
- Operator: Faucett Perú
- Registration: OB-R-148
- Flight origin: Lima Airport; Lima, Peru
- Stopover: Huánuco Airport; Huánuco, Peru
- Destination: Tingo Maria Airport; Tingo Maria, Peru
- Occupants: 72
- Passengers: 66
- Crew: 6
- Fatalities: 72
- Survivors: 0

A Faucett Perú operated domestic scheduled Lima–Huánuco–Tingo Maria passenger flight, operated with a Douglas C-54, crashed on 8 December 1967 against a mountain at Cordillera de Carpish. All 66 passengers and 6 crew members aboard were killed.

== Accident details ==
The Douglas C-54 operated by Faucett Perú was on 8 December 1967 a domestic scheduled passenger flight from Lima via Huánuco to Tingo Maria. The involved aircraft involved had made its first flight in 1944 and had registration: OB-R-148 and MSN: 10284. From Lima there were 65 people on board: 60 passengers and 5 crew members. All people on board were Peruvian citizens except for three Italian citizens and two Belgian citizens. After Huánuco there were 72 people on board: 66 passengers and 6 crew members.

After a short stopover in Huánuco, the airplane crashed at 12:00 near at the eastern slope near the top of a 3300 metres high mountain at Cordillera de Carpish in the Andes. The burning wreckage tumbled 3,000 feet below the summit. The crash occurred within 100 metres of the highway between Lima and Tingo Maria. Motorists and police officers went to the crash site. They tried to rescue people from the airplane but could not save any lives. All 72 people on board were killed. By the time that rescuers arrived at the scene, they found that looters from Huánuco had taken clothes, money, rings and other possessions from the bodies of the victims.

It is assumed that due to the clouds the pilot Manuel Macco Morales (42) did not see the mountain in time and crashed.
