= Trompeteros Airport =

Airport in Peru

- IATA: TDP; ICAO: SPDR

Summary
- Airport type: Public
- Serves: Trompeteros
- Elevation AMSL: 418 ft / 127 m
- Coordinates: 3°48′20″S 75°02′20″W

Map
- Location of the airport in Peru

Runways
Direction	Length		Surface
Direction	m	ft	Surface
11/29	1,850	6,070	Asphalt
- Source: GCM Google Maps

Trompeteros Airport (ICAO: SPDR) is an airport serving the town of Trompeteros in the Loreto Region of Peru. The airport runs along the south bank of the Corrientes River. The town is 1.5 kilometres (0.93 mi) west of the airport, on the opposite side of the river.

The Corrientes/Trompeteros VOR-DME (Ident: TRO) and Corrientes/Trompeteros non-directional beacon (Ident: TRO) are located on the field.

== See also ==
- Transport in Peru
- List of airports in Peru
