= Palmas Del Espino Airport =

- IATA: none; ICAO: SPPN

Summary
- Airport type: Public
- Owner: Palmas del Espino S.A.
- Elevation AMSL: 1,625 ft / 495 m
- Coordinates: 8°20′40″S 76°29′22″W

Map
- Location of the airport in Peru

Runways
Direction	Length		Surface
Direction	m	ft	Surface
18/36	1,760	5,774	Gravel
- Source: GCM Google Maps

Palmas Del Espino Airport (ICAO: SPPN) is an airport serving the oil palm plantations of Palmas del Espino S.A. in the San Martín Region of Peru. The airport is midway between the towns of Tocache and Uchiza.

== See also ==
- Transport in Peru
- List of airports in Peru
