= Mayor FAP Guillermo Protset del Castillo Airport =

Vitor Airport Mayor FAP Guillermo Protset del Castillo Airport
- IATA: none; ICAO: SPVR

Summary
- Airport type: Military/Public
- Serves: Vitor District (es)
- Location: La Joya
- Elevation AMSL: 5,145 ft / 1,568 m
- Coordinates: 16°25′30″S 71°50′05″W

Map
- Location of the airport in Peru

Runways
Direction	Length		Surface
Direction	m	ft	Surface
03/21	3,000	9,843	Concrete, Asphalt
- Source: WAC

Mayor FAP Guillermo Protset del Castillo Airport (ICAO: SPVR), also known as Vitor Airport and with an additional ICAO code of SPVT, is an airport serving the Vitor District in the Arequipa Region of Peru. The joint military and public airport is just west of the agricultural town of La Joya.

== See also ==
- Transport in Peru
- List of airports in Peru
