= Vicco =

Vicco may refer to:

== People ==
- Vicco (singer) (born 1995), Spanish singer

== Places ==
- Vicco, Kentucky, city in Kentucky, U.S.
- Vicco, Peru, locality in Peru
  - Vicco Airport, airport in Peru
  - Vicco District, district in Peru

== Other ==
- Vicco Group, Indian Ayurvedic manufacturer
