= San Rafael Airport (Peru) =

- IATA: none; ICAO: SPRF

Summary
- Airport type: Public
- Serves: San Rafael mine, Peru
- Elevation AMSL: 14,422 ft / 4,396 m
- Coordinates: 14°16′55″S 70°22′50″W

Map
- Location of the airport in Peru

Runways
Direction	Length		Surface
Direction	m	ft	Surface
11/29	2,925	9,596	Gravel, concrete
- Source: GCM Google Maps

San Rafael Airport (ICAO: SPRF) is an extremely high elevation airport serving the San Rafael tin mine in the Puno Region of Peru.

== See also ==
- Transport in Peru
- List of airports in Peru
