= Güeppi Airport =

Airport in Peru

- IATA: none; ICAO: SPGP; LID: SP01

Summary
- Airport type: Public
- Serves: Güeppi (es), Peru
- Elevation AMSL: 680 ft (210 m)
- Coordinates: 0°07′15″S 75°15′00″W

Map
- Location of the airport in Peru

Runways
| Direction | Length | | Surface |
| Direction | m | ft | Surface |
|---|---|---|---|
| 05/23 | 1,300 | 4,265 | Asphalt |
- Source: GCM Google Maps

Güeppi Airport (ICAO: SPGP) is an airport serving the town of Güeppi (es) in the Loreto Region of Peru. It lies on the confluence of the river Güeppi with the Putumayo River at Peru's tri-border with Colombia and Ecuador.

== Airlines and destinations ==
| Airlines | Destinations |
|---|---|
| Saeta Peru | Iquitos |

== See also ==
- Transport in Peru
- List of airports in Peru
