= Orcopampa Airport =

Airport in Peru

Orcopampa Airport Minas Buenaventura Airport
- IATA: none; ICAO: SPOR

Summary
- Airport type: Public
- Serves: Orcopampa (es), Peru
- Elevation AMSL: 12,322 ft / 3,756 m
- Coordinates: 15°18′45″S 72°21′00″W

Map
- Location of the airport in Peru

Runways
Direction	Length		Surface
Direction	m	ft	Surface
03/21	1,980	6,496	Gravel
- Source: GCM Google Maps

Orcopampa Airport (ICAO: SPOR) is an extremely high elevation airport serving the town of Orcopampa (es) and the Minas Buenaventura open pit mine in the Arequipa Region of Peru.

== See also ==
- Transport in Peru
- List of airports in Peru
