= Vilcashuamán Airport =

Airport in Peru

- IATA: none; ICAO: SPVN

Summary
- Airport type: Public
- Serves: Vilcashuamán
- Elevation AMSL: 11,965 ft / 3,647 m
- Coordinates: 13°40′50″S 73°55′30″W

Map
- Location of the airport in Peru

Runways
Direction	Length		Surface
Direction	m	ft	Surface
13/31	1,590	5,217	Asphalt
- Source: GCM Google Maps

Vilcashuamán Airport (ICAO: SPVN) is a very high elevation airport serving the town of Vilcashuamán in the Ayacucho Region of Peru. The runway has rising terrain in all quadrants.

== See also ==
- Transport in Peru
- List of airports in Peru
