= Pampa Grande Airport =

Airport in Peru

- IATA: none; ICAO: SPJB

Summary
- Airport type: Public
- Serves: Cajabamba
- Elevation AMSL: 8,727 ft / 2,660 m
- Coordinates: 7°36′50″S 78°03′40″W

Map
- Location of the airport in Peru

Runways
Direction	Length		Surface
Direction	m	ft	Surface
05/23	660	2,165	Gravel
- Source: GCM Google Maps

Pampa Grande Airport (ICAO: SPJB) is an airport serving the town of Cajabamba, in the Cajamarca Region of Peru. The runway is 1.6 kilometres (0.99 mi) west of the town.

== See also ==
- Transport in Peru
- List of airports in Peru
