= Chagual Airport =

Airport in Peru

- IATA: CGL; ICAO: SPGL

Summary
- Airport type: Public
- Serves: Chagual (es), Peru
- Elevation AMSL: 3,967 ft / 1,209 m
- Coordinates: 7°47′50″S 77°39′05″W

Map
- Location of the airport in Peru

Runways
Direction	Length		Surface
Direction	m	ft	Surface
14/32	1,205	3,953	Asphalt
- Source: GCM Google Maps

Chagual Airport (IATA: CGL, ICAO: SPGL) is an airport serving the town of Chagual (es) in the La Libertad Region of Peru. The runway is in a deep canyon, on the banks of the Marañón River.

The runway length of 1,205 metres (3,953 ft) includes a 300 metres (980 ft) displaced threshold on the northwestern end. There is mountainous terrain in all quadrants.

== See also ==
- Transport in Peru
- List of airports in Peru
