= Alerta Airport =

Airport in Peru

- IATA: ALD; ICAO: SPAR

Summary
- Airport type: Public
- Operator: CORPAC S.A.
- Serves: Alerta, Peru
- Elevation AMSL: 797 ft (243 m)
- Coordinates: 11°39′00″S 69°13′45″W

Map
- Location of the airport in Peru

Runways
Direction	Length		Surface
Direction	m	ft	Surface
09/27	1,210	3,970	Grass
- GCM Landings.com

Alerta Airport (IATA: ALD, ICAO: SPAR) is an airstrip serving Alerta, a village near the Bolivian border in the Ucayali Region of Peru. The village is on the Río Muymanu (sv), a stream in the Amazon basin.

The airstrip is 1 kilometre (0.6 mi) north of the village. The runway may have 660 metres (2,170 ft) usable length due to encroaching vegetation.

The Iberia non-directional beacon (Ident: IBE) is 19.3 nautical miles (35.7 km) northwest of the airstrip.

== See also ==
- Transport in Peru
- List of airports in Peru
