= Caballococha Airport =

Airport in Peru

- IATA: none; ICAO: SPBC

Summary
- Airport type: Public
- Operator: CORPAC S.A.
- Serves: Caballococha
- Elevation AMSL: 328 ft / 100 m
- Coordinates: 3°55′00″S 70°30′30″W

Map
- Location of the airport in Peru

Runways
Direction	Length		Surface
Direction	m	ft	Surface
12/30	1,800	5,906	Asphalt
- Source: GCM Google Maps

The Caballococha Airport (ICAO: SPBC) is a small regional airport serving Caballococha, in the eastern Loreto Region of Peru near the Tres Fronteras, which is a tri-border between Peru, Brazil, and Colombia. It receives charter flights from all over Peru as well as to Colombia and Brazil.

== Airlines and destinations ==
Airlines	Destinations
Saeta Peru	Iquitos

== See also ==
- Transport in Peru
- List of airports in Peru
