= Galilea Airport =

Airport in Peru

- IATA: none; ICAO: SPGB

Summary
- Airport type: Public
- Serves: Puerto Galilea (es), Peru
- Elevation AMSL: 597 ft / 182 m
- Coordinates: 4°01′50″S 77°45′30″W

Map
- Location of the airport in Peru

Runways
Direction	Length		Surface
Direction	m	ft	Surface
17/35	2,000	6,562	Asphalt
- Source: GCM Google Maps

Galilea Airport (ICAO: SPGB) is an airport serving the river town of Puerto Galilea (es) in the Amazonas Region of Peru. The runway is south of the town, which is within a bend of the Rio Santiago, a tributary of the Marañón River, the principal source of the Amazon River.

== Airlines and destinations ==
Airlines	Destinations
Saeta Perú	Tarapoto

== See also ==
- Transport in Peru
- List of airports in Peru
