= El Estrecho Airport =

Peru airport

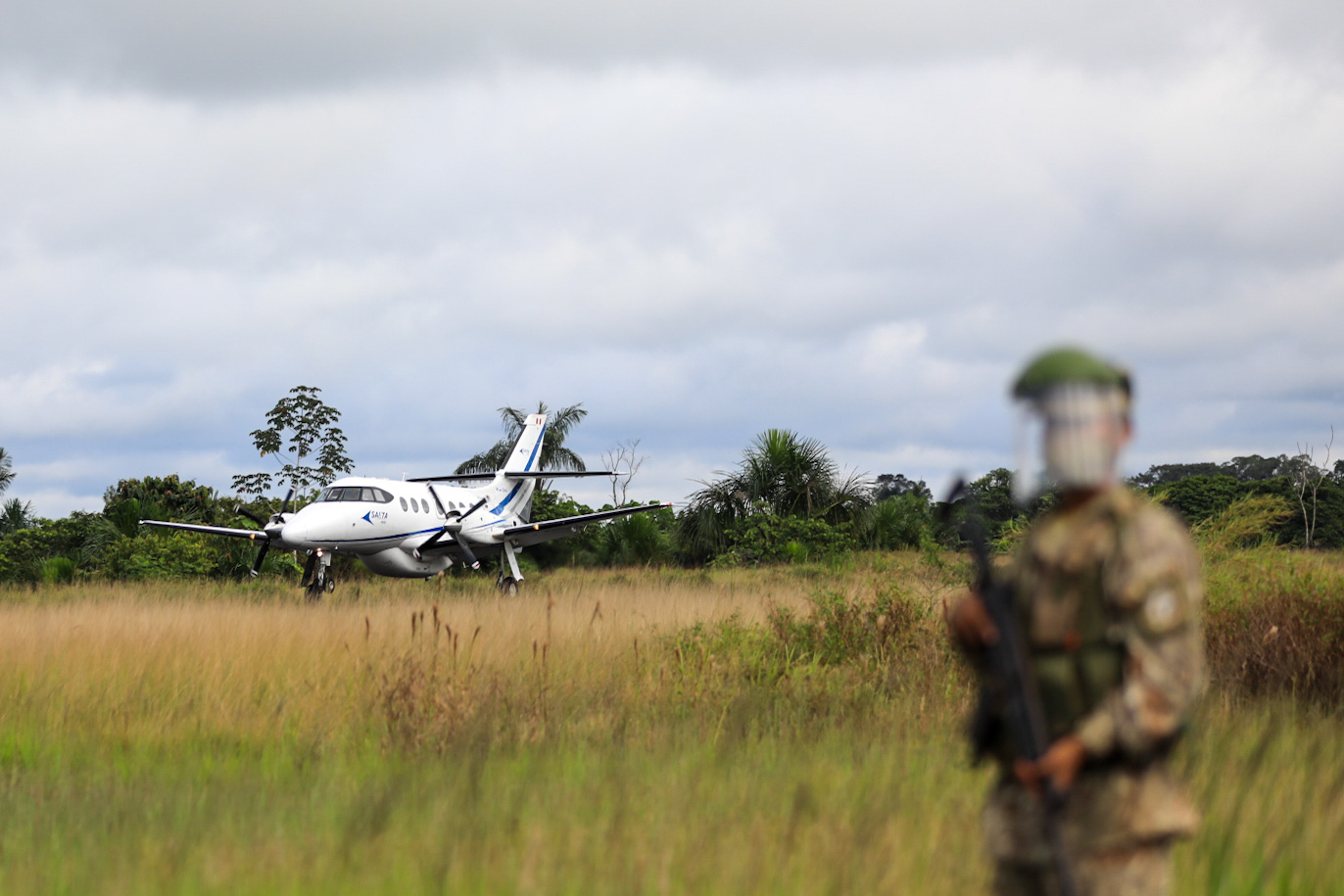
- IATA: none; ICAO: SPEE

Summary
- Airport type: Public
- Serves: El Estrecho (es), Peru
- Elevation AMSL: 421 ft / 128 m
- Coordinates: 2°27′10″S 72°40′20″W

Map
- Location of the airport in Peru

Runways
Direction	Length		Surface
Direction	m	ft	Surface
13/31	1,205	3,953	Asphalt
- Source: GCM Google Maps

El Estrecho Airport (ICAO: SPEE) is an airport serving the town of El Estrecho in the Loreto Region of Peru. The town is on the Putumayo River, which forms most of the border between Colombia and Peru.

== Airlines and destinations ==
Airlines	Destinations
Saeta Peru	Iquitos

== See also ==
- Transport in Peru
- List of airports in Peru
