= Manu Airport =

- IATA: none; ICAO: SPNU

Summary
- Airport type: Public
- Elevation AMSL: 1,010 ft / 308 m
- Coordinates: 12°17′20″S 70°53′25″W

Map
- Location of the airport in Peru

Runways
Direction	Length		Surface
Direction	m	ft	Surface
03/21	1,480	4,856	Grass
- Source: GCM HERE Maps

Manu Airport (ICAO: SPNU) is an airstrip serving the village of Boca Manu and the Manu National Park in the Department of Madre de Dios of Peru. The grass runway is on the opposite side of the Madre de Dios River, 3.5 kilometres (2.2 mi) southwest of the village, which is near the confluence of the Madre de Dios and Manu Rivers.

== See also ==
- Transport in Peru
- List of airports in Peru
