= Bolognesi Airport =

Airport in Peru

- IATA: none; ICAO: SPBL

Summary
- Airport type: Private
- Serves: Bolognesi (es), Peru
- Elevation AMSL: 630 ft / 192 m
- Coordinates: 10°01′45″S 73°56′30″W

Map
- Location of the airport in Peru

Runways
Direction	Length		Surface
Direction	m	ft	Surface
09/27	1,180	3,871	Asphalt
- Source: GCM Google Maps SkyVector

Bolognesi Airport (ICAO: SPBL) is an airport serving the village of Bolognesi (es), capital of the Tahuanía District (es) in the Ucayali Region of Peru. The runway is just east of the village, which is near an oxbow of the Ucayali River.

The Atalaya non-directional beacon (Ident: LAY) is located 42.9 nautical miles (79 km) south of the airport.

== See also ==
- Transport in Peru
- List of airports in Peru
