= Lib Mandy Metropolitano Airport =

Lib Mandi Metropolitano Airport
- IATA: none; ICAO: SPLX

Summary
- Airport type: Public
- Serves: Lima metropolitan area
- Location: San Bartolo
- Hub for: Master of the Sky , Aerolink Peru
- Elevation AMSL: 200 ft (61 m)
- Coordinates: 12°23′20″S 76°45′30″W

Map
- Location of the airport in Peru

Runways
Direction	Length		Surface
Direction	m	ft	Surface
14/32	1,000	3,281	Asphalt
- Source: GCM Google Maps

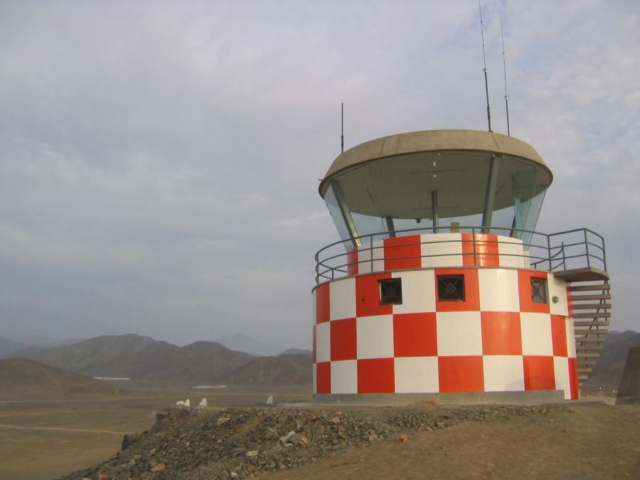
Control Tower at LibMandy airport, Lima

Lib Mandi Metropolitano Airport (ICAO: SPLX) is an airport serving the coastal town of San Bartolo, in the metropolitan area of Lima. It is located inside the Lima Region of Peru. The runway is 2.4 kilometres (1.5 mi) inland from the Pacific Ocean shore. It is a base of a school of pilots (Master of the Sky). The airport also offer charter and aviation services with Aerolink Peru. Currently does not show scheduled flights.

== See also ==
- Transport in Peru
- List of airports in Peru
