= Contamana Airport =

Airport in Peru

- IATA: none; ICAO: SPCM

Summary
- Airport type: Public
- Owner: Municipalidad Provincial de Ucayali
- Serves: Contamana, Peru
- Elevation AMSL: 487 ft / 148 m
- Coordinates: 7°20′08″S 74°59′35″W

Map
- Location of the airport in Peru

Runways
Direction	Length		Surface
Direction	m	ft	Surface
09/27	960	3,150	Asphalt
- Sources: GCM Google Maps

Contamana Airport (ICAO: SPCM), is an airport serving the Ucayali River town of Contamana, in the Loreto Region of Peru.

The Contamana non-directional beacon (Ident: ANA) is located within the town, 1.5 kilometres (0.93 mi) southwest of the runway.

== Airlines and destinations ==
Airlines	Destinations
Saeta Peru	Pucallpa, Tarapoto

== See also ==
- Transport in Peru
- List of airports in Peru
