= Tnte. FAP Jaime Montreuil Morales Airport =

Airport in Peru

Teniente FAP Jaime Montreuil Morales Airport
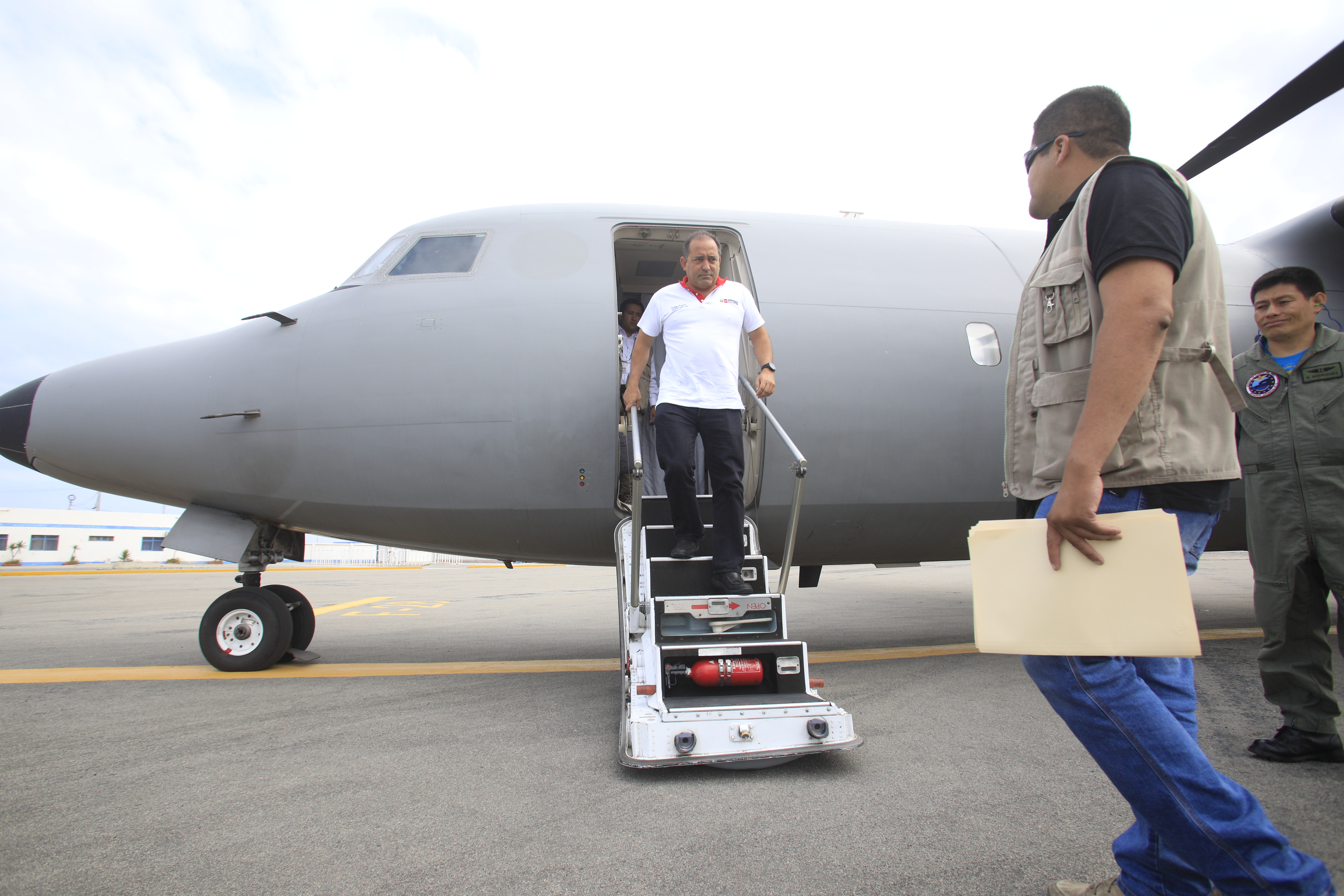
- IATA: CHM; ICAO: SPEO

Summary
- Airport type: Public
- Operator: CORPAC S.A.
- Location: Chimbote
- Elevation AMSL: 69 ft / 21 m
- Coordinates: 9°09′00″S 78°31′25″W

Map
- Location of the airport in Peru

Runways
Direction	Length		Surface
Direction	m	ft	Surface
01/19	1,800	5,906	Asphalt
- Sources: GCM

Teniente FAP Jaime Montreuil Morales Airport (IATA: CHM, ICAO: SPEO) is an airport serving Chimbote, in the Ancash Region of Peru. It is operated by the civil government and handles many government planes.

== Airlines and destinations ==
As of December 2022, there are no regular scheduled passenger flights.

== Former Destinations ==
Airlines	Destinations
Atsa Airlines	Lima

== Expansion ==
In January 2023, a plan was introduced to expand airport infrastructure within Peru. Chimbote was named for new investment. There are currently no public plans to the airport expansion.

== See also ==
- Transport in Peru
- List of airports in Peru
