= Colonia Angamos Airport =

Airport in Peru

- IATA: none; ICAO: SPDN

Summary
- Airport type: Public
- Serves: Colonia Angamos (es), Peru
- Elevation AMSL: 427 ft / 130 m
- Coordinates: 5°08′15″S 72°52′05″W

Map
- Location of the airport in Peru

Runways
Direction	Length		Surface
Direction	m	ft	Surface
06/24	1,250	4,101	Grass
- Source: GCM Google Maps

Colonia Angamos Airport (ICAO: SPDN) is an airport serving the village of Colonia Angamos (es) in the Loreto Region of Peru.

Colonia Angamos is a village on the Javary River, a tributary of the Amazon River. The Javary forms part of the boundary between Brazil and Peru.

== Airlines and destinations ==
Airlines	Destinations
Saeta Peru	Iquitos

== See also ==
- Transport in Peru
- List of airports in Peru
