= SPRM =

SPRM may refer to:

== Science ==
- Sprm1, a POU domain protein also known as POU5F2
- Selective progesterone receptor modulator
- Surface plasmon resonance microscopy

== Other ==
- Malaysian Anti-Corruption Commission (Suruhanjaya Pencegahan Rasuah Malaysia)
- Somali People's Resistance Movement (Al-Shabaab)
- Capitán FAP Leonardo Alvariño Herr Airport (IATA code)
