= Iberia Airport =

Airport in Peru

- IATA: IBP; ICAO: SPBR

Summary
- Airport type: Public
- Serves: Iberia, Madre de Dios, Peru
- Elevation AMSL: 750 ft / 229 m
- Coordinates: 11°24′35″S 69°29′25″W

Map
- Location of the airport in Peru

Runways
Direction	Length		Surface
Direction	m	ft	Surface
13/31	1,330	4,364	Concrete
- Sources: World Aero Data GCM Google Maps

Iberia Airport (IATA: IBP, ICAO: SPBR, FAA LID: Iberia Airport) is an airport serving Iberia in the Madre de Dios Region of Peru. The town is in the Amazon basin, 18 kilometres (11 mi) from the Peruvian border with Bolivia.

The Iberia non-directional beacon (Ident: IBE) is located 1 kilometre (0.62 mi) north of the runway.

== See also ==
- List of airports in Peru
- Transport in Peru
