= Sepahua Airport =

Airport in Peru

- IATA: none; ICAO: SPSE

Summary
- Airport type: Public
- Serves: Sepahua (es), Peru
- Elevation AMSL: 1,000 ft / 305 m
- Coordinates: 11°08′35″S 73°02′00″W

Map
- Location of the airport in Peru

Runways
| Direction | Length | | Surface |
| Direction | m | ft | Surface |
|---|---|---|---|
| 09/27 | 1,800 | 5,906 | Grass |
- Source: GCM Google Maps

Sepahua Airport (ICAO: SPSE) is an airport serving the village of Sepahua (es) in the Ucayali Region of Peru.

The airport is at the confluence of the Sepahua River into the Urubamba River.

== See also ==
- Transport in Peru
- List of airports in Peru
