= San Nicolas Airport =

- IATA: RIM; ICAO: SPLN

Summary
- Airport type: Public
- Serves: Mendoza
- Location: San Nicolas, Peru
- Elevation AMSL: 5,085 ft / 1,550 m
- Coordinates: 6°23′30″S 77°30′10″W

Map
- Location of the airport in Peru

Runways
Direction	Length		Surface
Direction	m	ft	Surface
10/28	1,800	5,906	Asphalt
- Source: GCM Google Maps

San Nicolas Airport (IATA: RIM, ICAO: SPLN) is a public airport serving the town of Mendoza in the Amazonas Region of Peru. The runway is just west of the town, at the adjoining village of San Nicolas.

== Airlines and destinations ==
Airlines	Destinations
Saeta Perú	Tarapoto

== See also ==
- Transport in Peru
- List of airports in Peru
