= Tipishsa Airport =

Airport in Peru

Tipishsa Airport Breu Airport
- IATA: none; ICAO: SPPB

Summary
- Airport type: Public
- Serves: Breu, Peru
- Elevation AMSL: 783 ft / 239 m
- Coordinates: 9°32′00″S 72°45′25″W

Map
- Location of the airport in Peru

Runways
Direction	Length		Surface
Direction	m	ft	Surface
02/20	1,000	3,281	Grass
- Source: GCM Google Maps

Tipishsa Airport (ICAO: SPPB) is an airport serving the village of Breu in the Ucayali Region of Peru. It also has an ICAO code of SPBK.

Breu is the administrative center of the Yurúa District. It is on the Juruá River, which drains into the Amazon basin.

== See also ==
- Transport in Peru
- List of airports in Peru
