= El Pato Air Base =

El Pato Air Base Base aérea El Pato
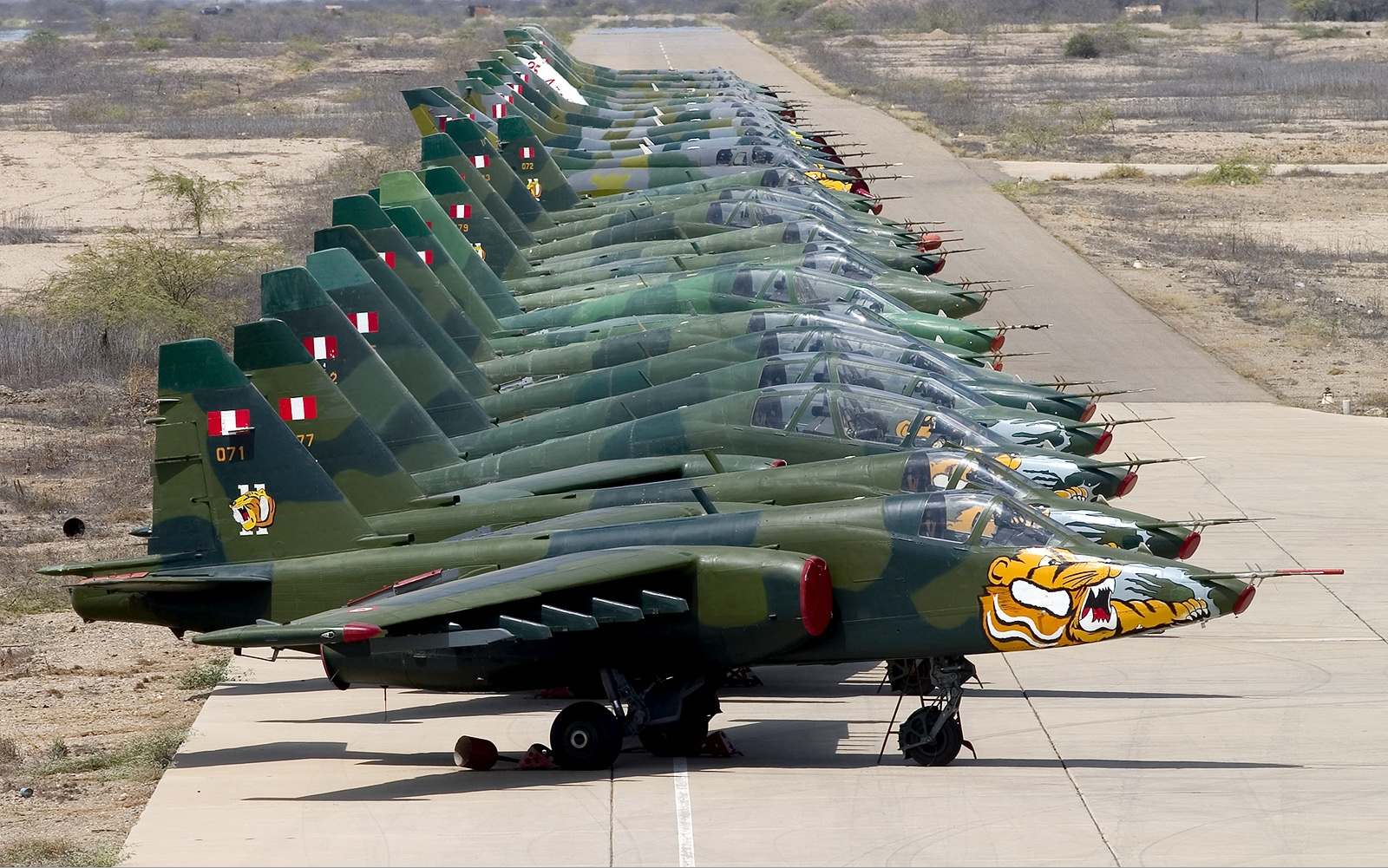
- IATA: none; ICAO: SPTP

Summary
- Airport type: Military
- Owner: Peruvian Air Force
- Operator: Peruvian Air Force
- Location: Talara, Peru
- Elevation AMSL: 286 ft / 87 m
- Coordinates: 4°33′00″S 81°13′27″W
- Interactive map of El Pato Air Base

Runways
Direction	Length		Surface
Direction	m	ft	Surface
18/36	2,600	8,530	Asphalt
- Sources: Google Maps GCM

Location of the air base in Peru

El Pato Air Base is a Peruvian Air Force base located near the city of Talara in the Piura Region of Peru, 4.5 kilometres (2.8 mi) northwest of FAP Captain Víctor Montes Arias International Airport.

The El Pato non-directional beacon (Ident: TYL) is located 2.3 nautical miles (4.3 km) southwest of the runway.

== See also ==
- Transport in Peru
- List of airports in Peru
