= Bellavista Airport =

Airport in Peru

- IATA: none; ICAO: SPBS

Summary
- Airport type: Public
- Serves: Jeberos
- Elevation AMSL: 675 ft / 206 m
- Coordinates: 5°17′20″S 76°17′20″W

Map
- Location of the airport in Peru

Runways
Direction	Length		Surface
Direction	m	ft	Surface
13/31	800	2,625	Grass
- Source: GCM Google Maps

Bellavista Airport (ICAO: SPBS) is an airstrip serving the town of Jeberos in the Loreto Region of Peru.

== See also ==
- Transport in Peru
- List of airports in Peru
