= Palmapampa Airport =

Airport in Peru

- IATA: none; ICAO: SPPE

Summary
- Airport type: Public
- Serves: Palmapampa
- Elevation AMSL: 2,340 ft / 713 m
- Coordinates: 12°45′50″S 73°39′10″W

Map
- Location of the airport in Peru

Runways
| Direction | Length | | Surface |
| Direction | m | ft | Surface |
|---|---|---|---|
| 03/21 | 970 | 3,182 | Gravel |
- Source: SkyVector Google Maps

Palmapampa Airport (ICAO: SPPE) is an airport serving the town of Palmapampa in the Ayacucho Region of Peru. The runway is just off the AY-101 Santa Rosa - Samugari Road.

== See also ==
- Transport in Peru
- List of airports in Peru
