= Cesar Torque Podesta Airport =

Airport in Peru

- IATA: none; ICAO: SPEQ

Summary
- Airport type: Public
- Serves: Moquegua, Peru
- Elevation AMSL: 4,480 ft / 1,366 m
- Coordinates: 17°10′45″S 70°55′50″W

Map
- Location of the airport in Peru

Runways
Direction	Length		Surface
Direction	m	ft	Surface
06/24	1,688	5,538	Asphalt
- Source: GCM Google Maps

Cesar Torque Podesta Airport (ICAO: SPEQ) is an airport serving the city of Moquegua, capital of the Moquegua Region of Peru.

== See also ==
- Transport in Peru
- List of airports in Peru
