= Kiteni Airport =

- IATA: none; ICAO: SPQI/SPKI

Summary
- Airport type: Public
- Serves: Kiteni
- Elevation AMSL: 2,540 ft / 774 m
- Coordinates: 12°38′55″S 73°02′12″W

Map
- Location of the airport in Peru

Runways
Direction	Length		Surface
Direction	m	ft	Surface
07/25	1,085	3,560	Asphalt
- Source: GCM Google Maps

Kiteni Airport (ICAO: SPQI/SPKI) is an airport serving the town of Kiteni in the Cusco Region of Peru. The runway sits on a ledge above the Urubamba River with dropoffs on both sides. There is high terrain in all quadrants.

== See also ==
- Transport in Peru
- List of airports in Peru
