= Pias Airport =

- IATA: PYZ; ICAO: SPIS

Summary
- Airport type: Public
- Serves: Pías, Peru
- Elevation AMSL: 6,283 ft / 1,915 m
- Coordinates: 7°55′15″S 77°31′30″W

Map
- Location of the airport in Peru

Runways
| Direction | Length | | Surface |
| Direction | m | ft | Surface |
|---|---|---|---|
| 14/32 | 1,660 | 5,446 | Gravel, asphalt |
- Source: GCM Google Maps

Pías Airport (IATA: PYZ, ICAO: SPIS) is an airport serving the village of Pías in the La Libertad Region of Peru. The airport is 5.5 kilometres (3.4 mi) southeast of the village, at the head of Lake Pías. The runway is on the banks of the Parcoy River and in a deep canyon with high terrain in all quadrants.

Pías Airport also serves the upstream mining operations of Consorcio Minero Horizonte S.A.

== See also ==
- Transport in Peru
- List of airports in Peru
