= Cuajone Botiflaca Airport =

Airport in Peru

- IATA: none; ICAO: SPDS

Summary
- Airport type: Public
- Serves: Cuajone (es)
- Location: Botiflaca
- Elevation AMSL: 11,204 ft / 3,415 m
- Coordinates: 17°04′15″S 70°46′15″W

Map
- Location of the airport in Peru

Runways
Direction	Length		Surface
Direction	m	ft	Surface
08/26	760	2,493	Asphalt
- Source: GCM Google Maps

Cuajone Botiflaca Airport (ICAO: SPDS) is a high elevation airport serving the mining town of Cuajone (es) in the Moquegua Region of Peru.

== See also ==
- Transport in Peru
- List of airports in Peru
