= Yauri Airport =

Airport in Peru

- IATA: none; ICAO: SPIY

Summary
- Airport type: Public
- Serves: Espinar
- Elevation AMSL: 12,795 ft / 3,900 m
- Coordinates: 14°47′40″S 71°25′55″W

Map
- Location of the airport in Peru

Runways
Direction	Length		Surface
Direction	m	ft	Surface
18/36	2,500	8,202	Asphalt
- Source: GCM Google Maps

Yauri Airport (ICAO: SPIY) is an extremely high elevation airport serving the town of Espinar in the Cusco Region of Peru.

== See also ==
- Transport in Peru
- List of airports in Peru
