= Atico Airport =

Airport in Peru

- IATA: none; ICAO: SPOY

Summary
- Airport type: Public
- Serves: Atico
- Elevation AMSL: 40 ft / 12 m
- Coordinates: 16°14′00″S 73°36′15″W

Map
- Location of the airport in Peru

Runways
Direction	Length		Surface
Direction	m	ft	Surface
12/30	1,305	4,281	Dirt
- Source: GCM Google Maps

Atico Airport (ICAO: SPOY) is an airport serving the Pacific coast Atico District in the Arequipa Region of Peru.

The Atico non-directional beacon (Ident: ACO) is located 1.46 nautical miles (2.70 km) off the approach end of runway 30.

== See also ==
- Transport in Peru
- List of airports in Peru
