= Las Dunas Airport =

Airport in Peru

- IATA: none; ICAO: SPLH

Summary
- Airport type: Private
- Owner: Jorge Chavez Dartnell - Escuela de Aviación Civil
- Location: Ica, Peru
- Elevation AMSL: 1,358 ft / 414 m
- Coordinates: 14°02′10″S 75°45′35″W

Map
- Location of the airport in Peru

Runways
Direction	Length		Surface
Direction	m	ft	Surface
15/33	1,560	5,118	Asphalt
- Sources: GCM Google Maps

Las Dunas Airport (ICAO: SPLH) is a private airport of Jorge Chavez Dartnell - Escuela de Aviación Civil, subsidiary of Alas Peruanas University located in the city of Ica, Peru. It is used mainly for pilot training. The runway is on the northwest side of Ica.

== See also ==
- Transport in Peru
- List of airports in Peru
