= Huamachuco Airport =

Peruvian airport

- IATA: none; ICAO: SPUC

Summary
- Airport type: Public
- Serves: Huamachuco
- Elevation AMSL: 10,367 ft / 3,160 m
- Coordinates: 7°49′05″S 78°01′45″W

Map
- Location of the airport in Peru

Runways
Direction	Length		Surface
Direction	m	ft	Surface
11/29	1,200	3,937	Asphalt
- Source: GCM Google Maps

Huamachuco Airport (ICAO: SPUC) is an airport serving Huamachuco, in the La Libertad Region of Peru. The very high elevation runway has mountainous terrain in all quadrants.

== See also ==
- Transport in Peru
- List of airports in Peru
