= Tulpo Airport =

- IATA: none; ICAO: SPTO

Summary
- Airport type: Public
- Serves: Santa Clara de Tulpo
- Elevation AMSL: 10,702 ft / 3,262 m
- Coordinates: 8°07′35″S 77°59′15″W

Map
- Location of the airport in Peru

Runways
| Direction | Length | | Surface |
| Direction | m | ft | Surface |
|---|---|---|---|
| 03/21 | 1,155 | 3,789 | Gravel |
- Source: GCM Google Maps

Tulpo Airport (ICAO: SPTO) is a high elevation airport serving the village of Santa Clara de Tulpo in the La Libertad Region of Peru. The runway sits across a ridge above the village, with mountainous terrain in all quadrants. A Comarsa metals mine is 4 kilometres (2.5 mi) to the northwest.

== See also ==
- Transport in Peru
- List of airports in Peru
