= Ciro Alegria Airport =

Airport in Peru

- IATA: none; ICAO: SPAC

Summary
- Airport type: Public
- Serves: Santa María de Nieva
- Elevation AMSL: 547 ft / 167 m
- Coordinates: 4°36′35″S 77°56′30″W

Map
- Location of the airport in Peru

Runways
Direction	Length		Surface
Direction	m	ft	Surface
02/20	1,650	5,413	Asphalt
- Source: GCM Google Maps

Ciro Alegria Airport (ICAO: SPAC) is an airport serving the town of Santa María de Nieva in the Amazonas Region of Peru. The runway is 8.7 kilometres (5.4 mi) west of the town, on the opposite side of the Marañón River.

== Airlines and destinations ==
Airlines	Destinations
Saeta Perú	Tarapoto

== See also ==
- Transport in Peru
- List of airports in Peru
