= Iñapari Airport =

Airport in Peru

- IATA: none; ICAO: SPIN

Summary
- Airport type: Public
- Serves: Iñapari, Peru
- Elevation AMSL: 800 ft / 244 m
- Coordinates: 10°58′45″S 69°33′35″W

Map
- Location of the airport in Peru

Runways
Direction	Length		Surface
Direction	m	ft	Surface
15/33	1,190	3,904	Asphalt, gravel
- Source: GCM Google Maps

Iñapari Airport (ICAO: SPIN) is an airport serving the town of Iñapari, in the Madre de Dios Region of Peru. The runway is 3.5 kilometres (2.2 mi) south of the town, paralleling the Interoceanic Highway, and very close to Peru's border with Brazil.

== See also ==
- Transport in Peru
- List of airports in Peru
