= Requena Airport =

Airstrip

- IATA: none; ICAO: SPQN

Summary
- Airport type: Public
- Serves: Requena
- Elevation AMSL: 394 ft / 120 m
- Coordinates: 5°04′35″S 73°51′25″W

Map
- Location of the airport in Peru

Runways
Direction	Length		Surface
Direction	m	ft	Surface
16/34	1,000	3,281	Gravel
- Source: GCM Google Maps

Requena (ICAO: SPQN) is an airstrip serving the Tapiche River town of Requena in the Loreto Region of Peru. The runway also serves as a street, and is lined with houses on its west side.

== See also ==
- Transport in Peru
- List of airports in Peru
