= Pacasmayo Airport =

Airport in Peru

- IATA: none; ICAO: SPYO

Summary
- Airport type: Public
- Serves: Pacasmayo
- Elevation AMSL: 95 ft / 29 m
- Coordinates: 7°24′50″S 79°34′13″W

Map
- Location of the airport in Peru

Runways
Direction	Length		Surface
Direction	m	ft	Surface
18/36	1,405	4,610	Dirt
- Source: GCM Google Maps

Pacasmayo (ICAO: SPYO) is an airport serving the Pacific coastal town of Pacasmayo in the La Libertad Region of Peru. The runway is just south of the town and 1.6 kilometres (1 mi) inland from the shore.

== See also ==
- Transport in Peru
- List of airports in Peru
