= Toquepala =

Toquepala may refer to:

- Toquepala Caves
- Toquepala mine
- Toquepala Airport
