= Uchiza Airport =

Airport in Peru

- IATA: ~~UCZ~~; ICAO: SPIZ

Summary
- Airport type: Public
- Serves: Uchiza
- Elevation AMSL: 1,965 ft / 599 m
- Coordinates: 8°28′25″S 76°27′38″W

Map
- Location of the airport in Peru

Runways
Direction	Length		Surface
Direction	m	ft	Surface
01/19	1,170	3,839	Grass
- Source: GCM Google Maps

Uchiza Airport (IATA: ~~UCZ~~, ICAO: SPIZ) is an airport serving the town of Uchiza in the San Martín Region of Peru. The runway is south of the town, alongside and between road 12A and a tributary of the Huallaga River.

== See also ==
- Transport in Peru
- List of airports in Peru
