= Pata de Gallo Airport =

Pata De Gallo Airport
- IATA: none; ICAO: SPGA

Summary
- Airport type: Public
- Serves: Quiruvilca (es), Peru
- Elevation AMSL: 13,720 ft / 4,182 m
- Coordinates: 7°59′00″S 78°16′00″W

Map
- Location of the airport in Peru

Runways
Direction	Length		Surface
Direction	m	ft	Surface
09/27	1,590	5,217	Asphalt
- Source: GCM Google Maps

Pata De Gallo Airport (ICAO: SPGA) is an extremely high elevation airport serving the town of Quiruvilca (es) in the La Libertad Region of Peru. The airport is on a ridge 4.6 kilometres (2.9 mi) east of the town.

== Quiruvilca Airport ==
The former Quiruvilca Airport (ICAO: SPQR) is 7.6 kilometres (4.7 mi) east of Pata De Gallo Airport, but aerial images show only deteriorated runway patches at the site.

== See also ==
- Transport in Peru
- List of airports in Peru
