= Capitán FAP Leonardo Alvariño Herr Airport =

Airport in Peru

- IATA: none; ICAO: SPRM

Summary
- Airport type: Public
- Serves: San Ramón
- Elevation AMSL: 2,600 ft / 792 m
- Coordinates: 11°07′45″S 75°21′02″W

Map
- Location of the airport in Peru

Runways
| Direction | Length | | Surface |
| Direction | m | ft | Surface |
|---|---|---|---|
| 01/19 | 975 | 3,199 | Asphalt |
- Source: GCM Google Maps

Capitán FAP Leonardo Alvariño Herr Airport (ICAO: SPRM) is an airport serving the city of San Ramón in the Junín Region of Peru.

The airport is in the valley of the Chanchamayo River. There is distant mountainous terrain in all quadrants, and a hill immediately to the east.

The San Ramon non-directional beacon (Ident: MON) is located 0.7 nautical miles (1.3 km) north of the airport.

== See also ==
- Transport in Peru
- List of airports in Peru
