= Ilo Airport =

Airport in Peru

- IATA: ILQ; ICAO: SPLO

Summary
- Airport type: Public
- Operator: Government
- Location: Ilo, Peru
- Elevation AMSL: 72 ft (22 m)
- Coordinates: 17°41′45″S 71°20′35″W

Map
- Location of the airport in Peru

Runways
Direction	Length		Surface
Direction	m	ft	Surface
12/30	2,500	8,202	Asphalt
- Source: WAD

Ilo Airport (IATA: ILQ, ICAO: SPLO) is located in the Department of Moquegua of Peru and serves the city of Ilo. The runway is on the Pacific shoreline 4 kilometres (2.5 mi) south of the city.

== See also ==
- Transport in Peru
- List of airports in Peru
