= Quince Mil Airport =

- IATA: UMI; ICAO: SPIL

Summary
- Airport type: Public
- Serves: Quince Mil
- Elevation AMSL: 2,047 ft / 624 m
- Coordinates: 13°13′55″S 70°45′10″W

Map
- Location of the airport in Peru

Runways
Direction	Length		Surface
Direction	m	ft	Surface
07/23	1,170	3,839	Grass
- Source: GCM HERE Maps Google Maps

Quince Mil (IATA: UMI, ICAO: SPIL) is a public airport serving the village of Quince Mil in the Cusco Region of Peru. The runway is in the strip of land between the Interoceanic Highway and the Araza River, a tributary of the Inambari River. Aerial images show brush growing mid-field.

== See also ==
- Transport in Peru
- List of airports in Peru
