= Atsa Airlines =

Charter airline in Peru

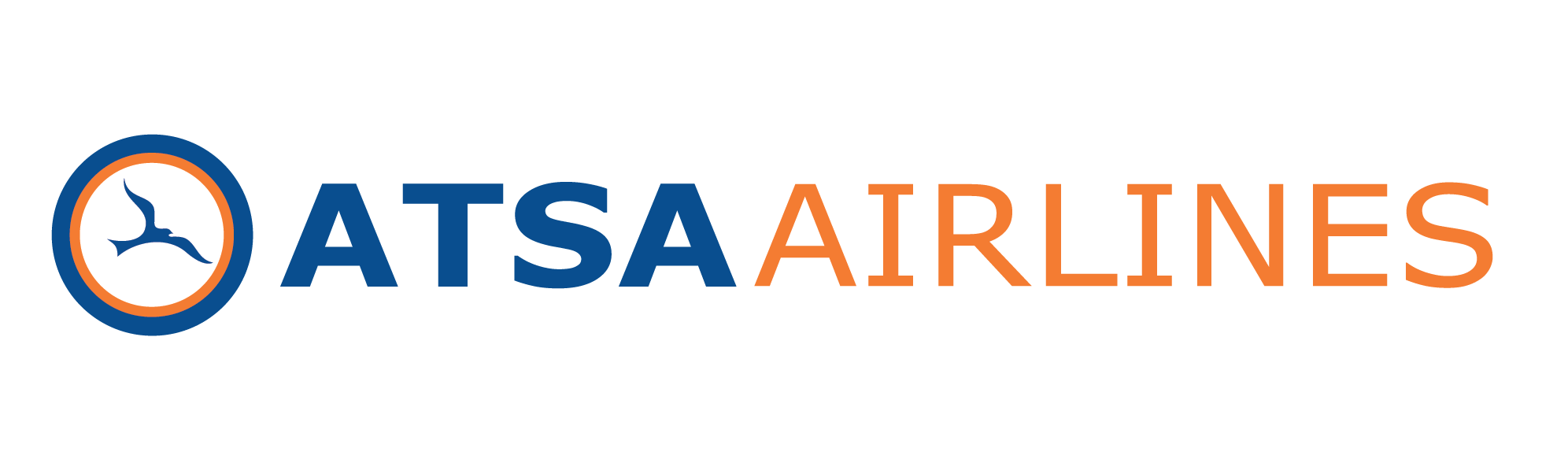
IATA	ICAO	Call sign
4A	AMP	ATSA
- Founded: 1980
- Commenced operations: 1981
- Hubs: Jorge Chávez International Airport
- Fleet size: 7
- Destinations: 6
- Headquarters: Lima, Peru
- Website: www.atsaairlines.com

Atsa Airlines is a Peruvian airline based in Lima, Peru. The airline corresponds to a business line of ATSA (Aero Transporte SA), a company with more than 39 years in the market under the support of the Romero Group. It operates passenger, cargo, and charter flights in Peru and South America. Its main hub is Jorge Chávez International Airport.

== History ==
Atsa, under the support of the Romero Group, began operations in 1980, dedicating itself to the corporate charter flight service . The initial fleet consisted of one Jet Citation Eagle and two PA-31T Piper Cheyenne IIs. In 1987, cargo operations began with the Shell oil company, in the Camisea area. For this service, two Beechcraft 1900 aircraft were acquired, which together with the Piper aircraft carried out charter passenger transport flights.

Operations soon expanded to Bolivia with the transportation of oil palm to Industrias Fino de Santa Cruz. This service was carried out with an L-188 aircraft, which later also carried out cabotage operations in Angola, until 1991. In 1999 the Citation was replaced by the IAI 1125 Astra, improving the executive transport service. A few years later, the second cargo plane, an Antonov An-26 was acquired.

In 2010, the first of two Fokker 50s was acquired for passenger transport operations with Repsol, joined by a second in 2013. A year later, the company's first An-32 arrives, strengthening the cargo transportation service. The following year, the cargo capacity was increased with the acquisition of more aircraft of the same type until there were four units. These aircraft carried out operations mainly for the oil industry at the airfields of the Las Malvinas Airport, Nuevo Mundo, Trompeteros, Andoas and Pucallpa. Two Super King aircraft and a G200 Jet were purchased for VIP transport. In 2013, the MEDEVAC business unit was created with a B-200 and a PA-41 certified as air ambulances, a service that would later be expanded to an international scope with the certification of the Astra jet as an ambulance.

In 2014, Atsa was certified to perform aerial work in the Radio AIDS Calibration modality, starting a new line of business both in Peru and other South American countries. In July 2017, with a larger commercial fleet of Fokker 50s and Dash Q400s, Atsa began operating commercial flights to Chachapoyas from Lima. ATSA would soon obtain four new domestic destinations and continue their operations.

== Destinations ==
As of 2024, Atsa Airlines operates scheduled routes between the following airports:

Country	City	Airport	Notes	Refs
Peru	Chachapoyas	Chachapoyas Airport		
Peru	Huánuco	Alférez FAP David Figueroa Fernandini Airport		
Peru	Lima	Jorge Chávez International Airport	Hub	
Peru	Tingo María	Tingo María Airport		
Peru	Mazamari	Mayor Nancy Flores Páucar Airport		

== Fleet ==
=== Current fleet ===
The Atsa Airlines fleet consists of the following aircraft (as of July 2025):

Aircraft	In service	Orders	Passengers	Notes
De Havilland Canada Dash Q-400	2	–	76	(as of August 2025)
Beechcraft King Air	2	–	10	For VIP and ambulance services
Beechcraft 1900D	2	–	19	(as of August 2025)
Cargo fleet
Antonov An-32	1	–	Cargo	
Total	8	2		

== Incidents and accidents ==
- On March 17, 2024, an Atsa Airlines Dash Q400 (OB-2195) flying from Mazamari to Lima, was ascending out of Mazamari when the crew needed to shut down the left engine due to loss of oil pressure. The crew decided to divert to Pucallpa, where the aircraft landed safely.

== See also ==
- List of airlines of Peru
