= Minsur =

- Company type: Public
- Traded as: BVL: MINSURI1
- Industry: Mining
- Founded: (1966)
- Headquarters: Lima, Peru
- Key people: Fortunato Brescia Moreyra (Chairman); Juan Luis Kruger (CEO)
- Products: Copper; Lead; Niobium; Tin; Zinc; Tantalum
- Revenue: ▲US$ 706.9 Million (2008)
- Website: www.minsur.com

Minsur is a Peru-based mining company engaged in the extraction, foundation and refining of tin and copper. It is also involved in the exploration for new minerals deposits, with a focus on gold, silver, lead, and zinc ores.

The company operates within five areas: mining, maintenance, security and environment, geology and planning and engineering. Minsur distributes its products to Europe, South America, the United States and Canada.

Minsur was founded in 1966 and its headquarters are located in Lima.

Minsur runs 3 operations in Peru: San Rafael mine, a tin mine which is third largest tin producer worldwide; Pucamarca, a gold mine; and Pisco smelter and refinery plant.

On 31 January 2014, Minsur raised US$450 million through issuance of international bonds, Bank of America Merrill Lynch, JP Morgan and Scotiabank were the Bookrunners of the bond. Minsur stated that proceeds of the issuance are used to repay the company $200 million credit facility as well as for capital expenditures and expansion projects.
