= Mollendo Airport =

Airport in Peru

- IATA: none; ICAO: SPDO

Summary
- Airport type: Public
- Serves: Mollendo
- Elevation AMSL: 26 ft / 8 m
- Coordinates: 17°2′45″S 71°58′50″W

Map
- Location of the airport in Peru

Runways
Direction	Length		Surface
Direction	m	ft	Surface
12/30	1,500	4,921	Gravel
- Sources: GCM Google Maps

Mollendo Airport (ICAO: SPDO) is a regional airport that serves the Pacific coast town of Mollendo in the Arequipa Region of Peru. It is 3.4 kilometres (2.1 mi) southeast of the town, along the beach. It has one runway and is operational only during the daytime.

== See also ==
- Transport in Peru
- List of airports in Peru
