= LC Perú =

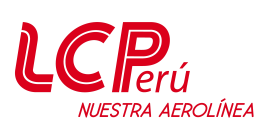
IATA	ICAO	Call sign
W4	LCB	BUSRE
- Founded: 1993 (as LC Busre)
- Ceased operations: December 12, 2018
- AOC #: LY0F915F
- Hubs: Jorge Chávez International Airport
- Frequent-flyer program: Destino
- Fleet size: 8
- Destinations: 12
- Headquarters: Lima, Peru
- Key people: Carlos Carmona A. (General manager)
- Website: lcperu.pe

LC Perú S.A.C. was a Peruvian regional airline based in Lima, Peru. It operated scheduled domestic and regional flights to Leticia, Colombia. Its main base was Jorge Chávez International Airport.

== History ==
The company was founded in 1993, they started operations as a cargo agent. In 1998, charter flights began for the periodic transport of passengers nationwide. In 2003, a second Fairchild Metro III was incorporated and ventured into regular passenger transport, for 2004 the destinations of Cajamarca, Ayacucho, Huánuco and Pucallpa were covered.

In 2011, the airline made an alliance with LAN Perú, in late 2011, the name was changed to the current name LC Perú. From the partnership with the USMP in 2011, the Fairchild Metro were withdrawn, replaced with Bombardier Dash 8 Q200, in 2013 the IOSA Certification and BARS Certification were obtained.

On December 12, 2018, the airline failed to renew its aviation insurance and was forced to declare bankruptcy.

== Destinations ==
As of December 2018, LC Perú served the following destinations:

City	Airport	Notes	Refs
Andahuaylas	Andahuaylas Airport		
Arequipa	Rodríguez Ballón International Airport		
Ayacucho	Coronel FAP Alfredo Mendívil Duarte Airport		
Cajamarca	Mayor General FAP Armando Revoredo Iglesias Airport		
Chiclayo	FAP Captain José Abelardo Quiñones González International Airport		
Cusco	Alejandro Velasco Astete International Airport		
Huánuco	Alférez FAP David Figueroa Fernandini Airport		
Huaraz	Comandante FAP Germán Arias Graziani Airport		
Lima	Jorge Chávez International Airport	Hub	
Pucallpa	FAP Captain David Abensur Rengifo International Airport		
Tingo María	Tingo María Airport		
Trujillo	FAP Captain Carlos Martínez de Pinillos International Airport		

== Fleet ==
=== Final fleet ===
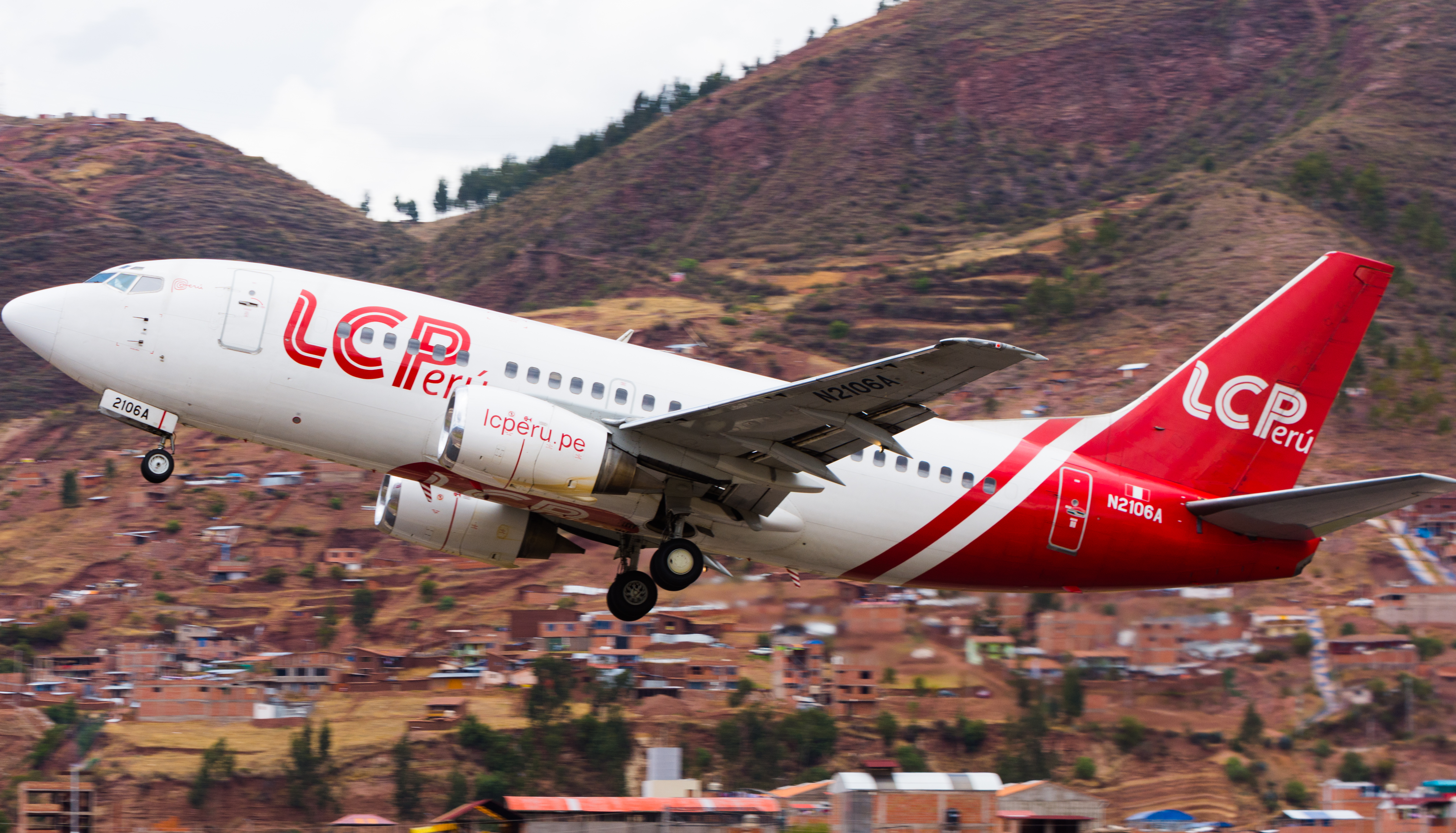
LC Perú Boeing 737-500

The LC Perú fleet consisted of the following aircraft (as of August 2018):

Aircraft	In service	Orders	Passengers	Notes
Bombardier Dash 8 Q200	1	—	37	
Bombardier Dash 8 Q400	3	—	76	
Boeing 737-500	4	—	120	
Boeing 737-900ER	—	2	186	
Total	8	2		

=== Retired fleet ===
LC Perú previously operated the following aircraft:

- 4 Fairchild Metro III
- 2 de Havilland Canada DHC-6 Twin Otter

== See also ==
- List of defunct airlines of Peru
