= Vicco Airport =

Airport in Peru

- IATA: none; ICAO: SPVI

Summary
- Airport type: Public
- Serves: Vicco
- Elevation AMSL: 13,461 ft / 4,103 m
- Coordinates: 10°50′40″S 76°14′50″W

Map
- Location of the airport in Peru

Runways
Direction	Length		Surface
Direction	m	ft	Surface
17/35	2,015	6,611	Gravel
- Source: GCM Google Maps

Vicco Airport (ICAO: SPVI) is a very high elevation airport serving the mining town of Vicco in the Pasco Region of Peru.

== See also ==
- Transport in Peru
- List of airports in Peru
