= Toquepala Airport =

Toquepala Airport Campamento Airport
- IATA: none; ICAO: SPTQ

Summary
- Airport type: Public
- Serves: Toquepala
- Elevation AMSL: 8,536 ft / 2,602 m
- Coordinates: 17°17′58″S 70°39′15″W

Map
- Location of the airport in Peru

Runways
Direction	Length		Surface
Direction	m	ft	Surface
09/27	630	2,067	Asphalt
- Source: GCM Google Maps

Toquepala Airport (ICAO: SPTQ) is a high-elevation airport serving the mining village of Toquepala in the Tacna Region of Peru. The runway has nearby high terrain in all quadrants.

== See also ==
- Transport in Peru
- List of airports in Peru
