= Vitor District =

Coordinates: 16°25′26″S 71°49′08″W

Vitor
- District
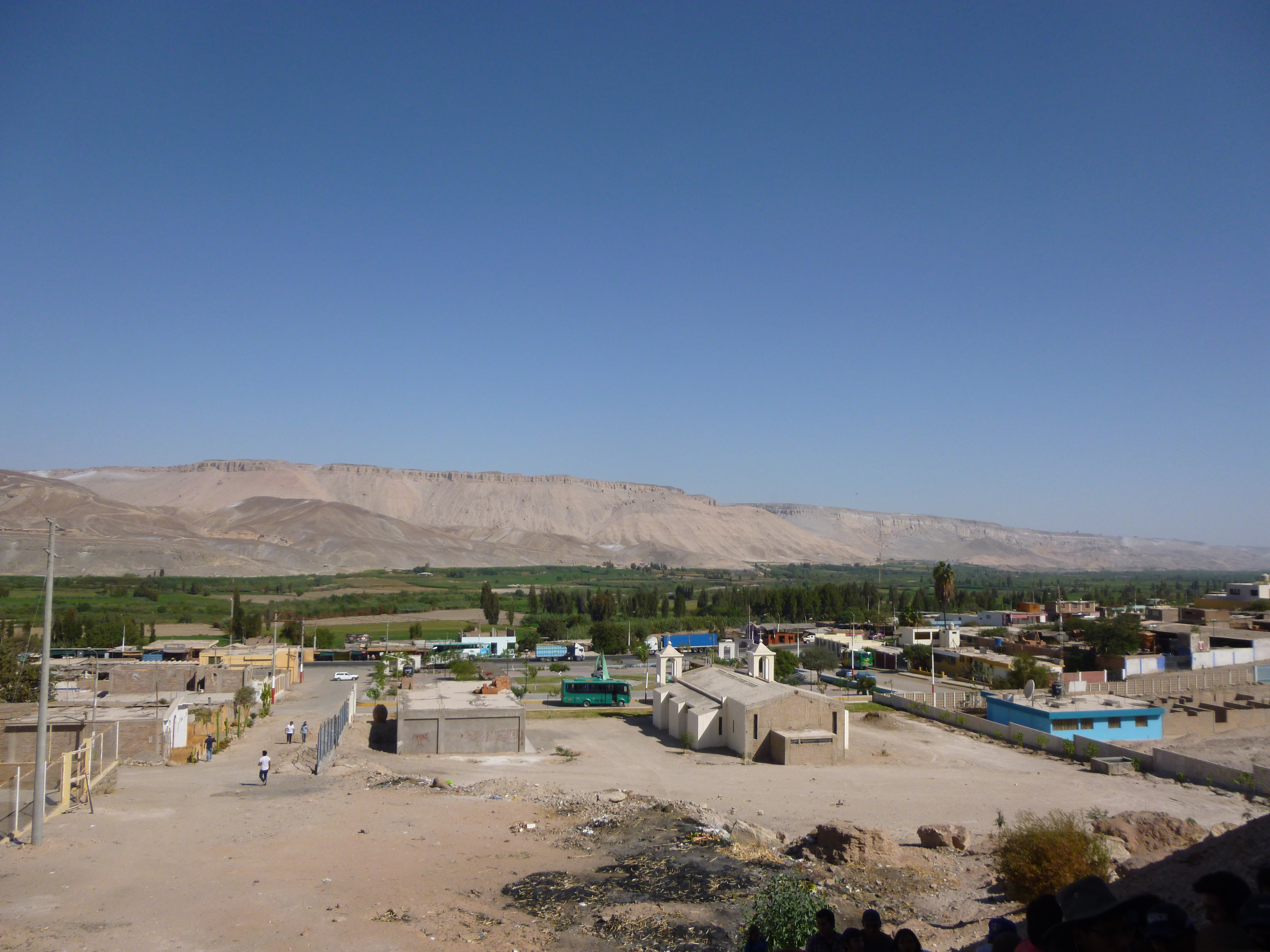
- Main square of Vitor
- Interactive map of Vitor
- Country: Peru
- Region: Arequipa
- Province: Arequipa
- Capital: Vitor

Government
  - Mayor: Cristhian Mario Cuadros Treviño

Area
  - Total: 1,543.5 km^{2} (595.9 sq mi)
- Elevation: 1,200 m (3,900 ft)

Population (2005 census)
  - Total: 3,007
  - Density: 1.948/km^{2} (5.046/sq mi)
- Time zone: UTC-5 (PET)
- UBIGEO: 040125

Vitor District is one of twenty-nine districts of the province Arequipa in Peru.
