= Jeberos =

- Location of Jeberos in Peru
- Coordinates: 5°17′30″S 76°17′00″W

Jeberos is a town in the Loreto Region of Peru. It is 37 kilometres (23 mi) south of the Marañón River. It had a population of 2,320 inhabitants in 2017.

Jeberos is served by the Bellavista Airport.
