= Moyobamba Airport =

- IATA: MBP; ICAO: SPBB

Summary
- Airport type: Public
- Serves: Moyobamba
- Elevation AMSL: 2,749 ft / 838 m
- Coordinates: 6°01′15″S 76°59′15″W

Map
- Location of the airport in Peru

Runways
Direction	Length		Surface
Direction	m	ft	Surface
16/34	1,320	4,331	Grass
- Source: GCM Google Maps

Moyobamba (IATA: MBP, ICAO: SPBB) is an airport serving the town of Moyobamba in the San Martín Region of Peru. The runway is just northwest of the town.

== See also ==
- Transport in Peru
- List of airports in Peru
