= Alerta =

Alerta Alerta
- Town
- Location within Peru
- Coordinates: 11°40′S 69°13′W
- Country: Peru
- Region: Madre de Dios Region
- Province: Tahuamanu Province
- District: Tahuamanu District

Alerta is a city in the Madre de Dios Region of Peru. It is located very close to the border with Bolivia. It is located 696 km (435 mi) from the region's capital, Pucallpa.

It is served by the Alerta Airport.
