= SPCHS =

- St. Paul Catholic High School
- St. Petersburg Catholic High School
