= Steve Perrin's Quest Rules =

Tabletop fantasy role-playing game

- Designers: Steve Perrin
- Publishers: Steve Perrin
- Publication: 2002; 23 years ago
- Genres: Fantasy
- Systems: Basic Role-Playing

Steve Perrin's Quest Rules (SPQR) is a role-playing game system created and published by Steve Perrin.

== History ==
SPQR rules are based on those Perrin created for the role-playing game RuneQuest, a game which was first published in 1978 by Chaosium and set in Greg Stafford's fantasy world, Glorantha. Stafford and Lynn Willis simplified the rules in order to publish a generic role-playing game system called Basic Role-Playing (BRP). First released in 1980, BRP served as a basic system of rules for almost all future role-playing games produced by Chaosium, including Call of Cthulhu (1981), Stormbringer (1981) and Pendragon (1985). One of those games, Superworld (1983), proved a commercial failure and resulted in the departure of Perrin from Chaosium. He began then to work as a video game designer for companies such as Interplay Productions, Maxis, and Spectrum Holobyte. He also worked freelance for many of the major players in the tabletop game industry including TSR, Inc., FASA Corporation, Hero Games, West End Games, and Iron Crown Enterprises. Only years later, in 2002, he decided to pick up again in business with his former game system, which he calls now Steve Perrin's Quest Rules (SPQR).

== Game system ==
As was the case for BRP, SPQR is both a simplified version of RuneQuest and a generic role-playing game system. For example, Strike Ranks and Resistance Table were eliminated. Perrin said in an interview in the September 2008 issue of RPG Review, "the game does not need two separate systems for resolving situations."
