= Juanjuí Airport =

Airport in Peru

Juanjuí Airport Aeropuerto de Juanjuí
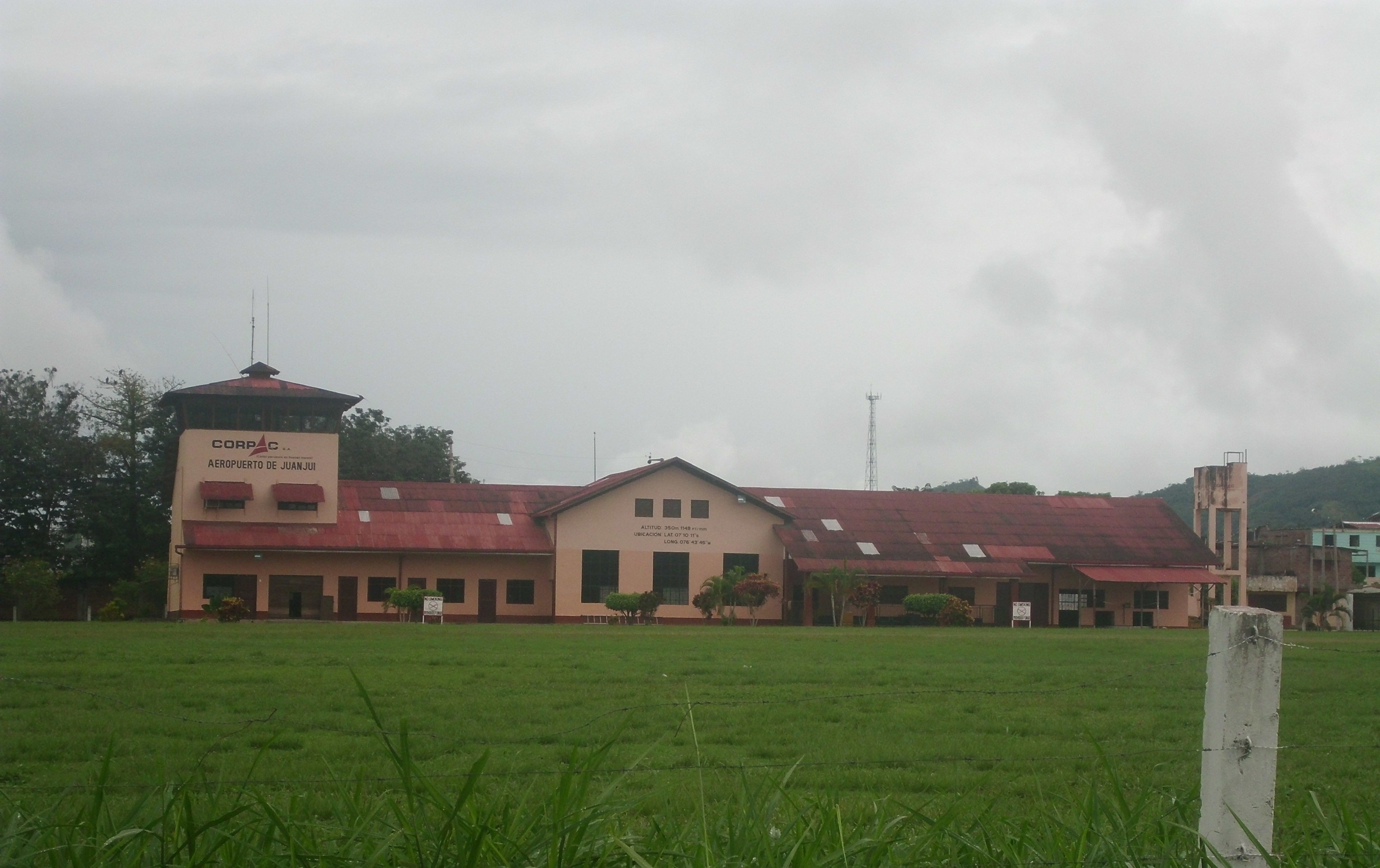
- IATA: JJI; ICAO: SPJI

Summary
- Airport type: Public
- Owner/Operator: CORPAC S.A.
- Serves: Juanjuí, San Martín Region, Peru
- Elevation AMSL: 1,148 ft (350 m)
- Coordinates: 7°10′10″S 76°43′45″W

Map
- Location of the airport in Peru

Runways
Direction	Length		Surface
Direction	m	ft	Surface
03/21	2,560	8,399	Gravel
- Sources: WAD GCM

Juanjuí Airport (Spanish: Aeropuerto de Juanjuí) (IATA: JJI, ICAO: SPJI) is an airport serving Juanjuí, a city on the Huallaga River in the San Martín Region of Peru. The airport is owned and operated by CORPAC S.A., a civil government agency.

The Juanjui non-directional beacon (Ident: UAN) is located just southeast of the runway.

== See also ==
- Transport in Peru
- List of airports in Peru
