= Ormeño =

Ormeño is a Spanish surname. Notable people with the surname include:

- Alonso de Olmedo y Ormeño (1626–1682), Spanish actor, playwright and writer
- Álvaro Ormeño (born 1979), Chilean footballer
- Filomeno Ormeño Belmonte (1899–1975), Peruvian composer, orchestrator and pianist
- Jorge Ormeño (born 1977), Chilean footballer
- María de la Luz Jiménez Ormeño (born 1934), Chilean actress, theater director and teacher
- Raúl Ormeño (born 1958), Chilean footballer
- Santiago Ormeño (born 1994), Mexican-Peruvian footballer, grandson of Walter
- Walter Ormeño (1926–2020), Peruvian footballer
  - Walter Ormeño de Cañete, a football club named after him
