= Lake Pías =

Lake in Peru

- Location within Peru
- Coordinates: 7°54′20″S 77°33′00″W
- Basin countries: Peru

Lake Pías is a lake in the La Libertad Region of Peru. It is in a mountain valley 3 kilometres (1.9 mi) south of the village of Pías, and just downstream of Pias Airport.

== See also ==
- List of lakes in Peru
