= Tocache Airport =

Airport in Peru

- IATA: none; ICAO: SPCH

Summary
- Airport type: Public
- Serves: Tocache
- Elevation AMSL: 1,631 ft / 497 m
- Coordinates: 8°11′43″S 76°31′45″W

Map
- Location of the airport in Peru

Runways
Direction	Length		Surface
Direction	m	ft	Surface
09/27	1,970	6,463	Grass
- Source: GCM Google Maps

Tocache Airport (ICAO: SPCH) is an airport serving the town of Tocache in the San Martín Region of Peru.

== See also ==
- Transport in Peru
- List of airports in Peru
