= San Rafael mine =

Mine in Peru

Coordinates: 14.2327°S 70.3207°W

San Rafael Mine
- Interactive map of San Rafael Mine
- Location: Puno Region, Peru
- Products: Tin
- Company: Minsur

San Rafael mine is a Minsur tin mining operation located in Puno region, Peru. San Rafael is the third largest tin producer worldwide currently producing 12% of the world's tin.

San Rafael concentration plant capacity was expanding from 2,700 to 2,900 tonnes/day during 2014. Sandvik installed a CH440 Sandvik Hydrocone crusher, Gekko Systems installed two InLine Pressure Jigs.

Amec Foster Wheeler on 2013 was in charge on getting approved the second amendment of the Environmental impact assessment for Tailings Dam Bofetal III project which includes the construction of the Larancota tailings deposit. The approval was granted by Peruvian Ministry of Energy and Mining on February 27, 2014, issuing the directorial resolution Nº100-2014-MEM/DGAAM.

== See also ==
- List of mines in Peru
- Tin mining
