= Vicco District =

Coordinates: 10.8442°S 76.2409°W

Vicco
- District
- Interactive map of Vicco
- Country: Peru
- Region: Pasco
- Province: Pasco
- Founded: March 17, 1958
- Capital: Vicco

Government
  - Mayor: Zenon Espinoza Panez

Area
  - Total: 173.3 km^{2} (66.9 sq mi)
- Elevation: 4,114 m (13,497 ft)

Population (2005 census)
  - Total: 2,901
  - Density: 16.74/km^{2} (43.36/sq mi)
- Time zone: UTC-5 (PET)
- UBIGEO: 190112

Vicco District is one of thirteen districts of the province of Pasco in Peru.

== See also ==
- Upamayu Dam
- Vicco Airport
