= Iberia District =

Iberia
- District
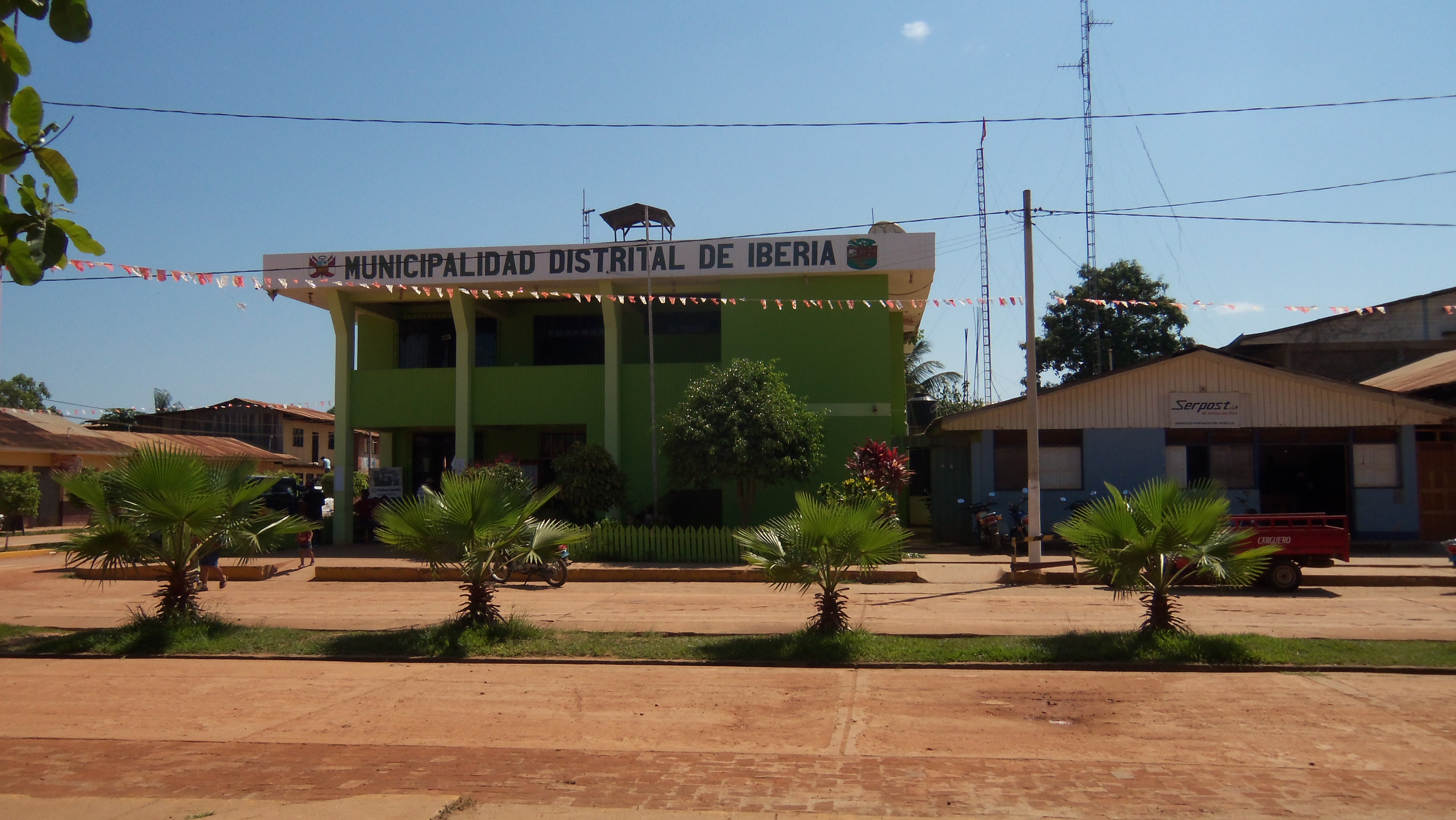

- Location of Iberia in the Tahuamanu Province

- Location within Peru
- Coordinates: 11.4086°S 69.4906°W
- Country: Peru
- Region: Madre de Dios
- Province: Tahuamanu
- Founded: June 7, 1961
- Capital: Iberia

Government
  - Mayor: Gilmer Gibaja Silva

Area
  - Total: 2,549.32 km^{2} (984.30 sq mi)
- Elevation: 260 m (850 ft)

Population (2005 census)
  - Total: 4,868
  - Density: 1.910/km^{2} (4.946/sq mi)
- Time zone: UTC-5 (PET)
- UBIGEO: 170302

Iberia District is one of three districts of the province Tahuamanu in Peru.
