= Quince Mil =

Coordinates: 13°14′S 70°46′W

Quince Mil (Spanish: "Fifteen Thousand") is a community in Cusco Region, Peru.

There are many stories regarding how the community received its name.

Quince Mil is located on the route of the Interoceanic Highway. The highway, which is nearing completion, will link the Pacific coast of Peru to the Atlantic coast of Brazil. In 2009 Quince Mil began expanding, anticipating the completion of the new road.

Quince Mil Airport is located in Quince Mil.
