= Tingo María Airport =

Airport in Peru

- IATA: TGI; ICAO: SPGM

Summary
- Airport type: public
- Serves: Tingo María, Huánuco, Peru
- Elevation AMSL: 2,146 ft (654 m)
- Coordinates: 9°17′15″S 76°00′18″W

Map
- Location of the airport in Peru

Runways
Direction	Length		Surface
Direction	m	ft	Surface
01/19	2,098	6,883	Gravel
- Sources: WAD, GCM, STV Google Maps

Tingo María Airport (IATA: TGI, ICAO: SPGM) is an airport serving Tingo María, in the Huánuco Region of Peru. The runway is alongside the west bank of the Huallaga River.

The Tingo Maria non-directional beacon (Ident: TGM) is located on the field.

== History ==
On February 25, 1994, Expresso Aéreo Flight 028 crashed into Mount Carpish, killing all 31 people. The crash is reported to have effectively ended commercial air links between Tingo María and Lima until LC Perú resumed the route in 2012.

== Airlines and destinations ==
Airlines	Destinations
Atsa Airlines	Lima

== Accidents and incidents ==
- On December 8, 1967, a Faucett DC-4 airliner, crashed into Mount Carpish at 10,200 feet, shortly before it was scheduled to land at Tingo María on a flight from Huánuco, killing all 66 passengers and six crew.
- On May 20, 1989, a US or Peruvian-owned Cessna 208 Caravan (PNP-021) that had left Tingo María on a DEA coca eradication mission taking place in the context of Operation Snowcap, crashed into Mount Huacranacro, 100 km (62.5 mls) east of Huaral. The 9 individuals on board (six American and three Peruvians) were killed. The plane may have suffered an engine failure.
- On February 25, 1994, Expresso Aéreo Flight 028, a Yakovlev Yak-40 (OB-1559), piloted by two Russians and one Peruvian, struck Mount Carpish six minutes after leaving Tingo María, for Lima. The 31 occupants were killed.

== See also ==
- Transport in Peru
- List of airports in Peru
