= Trompeteros District =

Coordinates: 3.8243°S 75.1031°W

Trompeteros
- District
- Interactive map of Trompeteros
- Country: Peru
- Region: Loreto
- Province: Loreto
- Founded: June 18, 1987
- Capital: Villa Trompeteros

Government
  - Mayor: José Panaifo Perez

Area
  - Total: 12,246 km^{2} (4,728 sq mi)
- Elevation: 125 m (410 ft)

Population (2005 census)
  - Total: 6,621
  - Density: 0.5407/km^{2} (1.400/sq mi)
- Time zone: UTC-5 (PET)
- UBIGEO: 160304

Trompeteros District is one of five districts of the province Loreto in Peru.
