= Alférez FAP David Figueroa Fernandini Airport =

Airport in Peru

Alf. FAP David Figueroa Fernandini
- IATA: HUU; ICAO: SPNC

Summary
- Airport type: Public
- Operator: CORPAC S.A.
- Serves: Huánuco
- Elevation AMSL: 6,070 ft / 1,850 m
- Coordinates: 9°52′45″S 76°12′20″W

Map
- Location of airport in Peru

Runways
Direction	Length		Surface
Direction	m	ft	Surface
07/25	2,500	8,202	Asphalt

Statistics
- Sources: GCM Google Maps

Alférez FAP David Figueroa Fernandini Airport (IATA: HUU, ICAO: SPNC) is an airport serving Huánuco, Peru. It is the most important airport in the Huánuco Region in central Peru and is operated by the civil government. It is currently served by 3 airlines, all of them offering daily flights to Lima: ATSA, Star Perú and Wayraperú. Although there are no other regular scheduled services, the airport serves many charter and private flights.

The runway is in the valley of the Huallaga River, with high terrain in all quadrants. The runway length includes a 300 metres (980 ft) displaced threshold on the western end.

The Huanuco non-directional beacon (Ident: NUC) is located on the field.

== Airlines and destinations ==
Airlines	Destinations
Atsa Airlines	Lima, Pucallpa, Tarapoto
Star Perú	Lima

== See also ==
- Transport in Peru
- List of airports in Peru
