= Uchiza District =

Coordinates: 8.4619°S 76.4784°W

- District
- Interactive map of Uchiza District
- Country: Peru
- Region: San Martín
- Province: Tocache
- Founded: October 21, 1912
- Capital: Uchiza

Government
  - Mayor: Segundo Emilio Nuñez Pantoja

Area
  - Total: 723.73 km^{2} (279.43 sq mi)
- Elevation: 544 m (1,785 ft)

Population (2005 census)
  - Total: 19,293
  - Density: 26.658/km^{2} (69.043/sq mi)
- Time zone: UTC-5 (PET)
- UBIGEO: 221005

Uchiza District is one of five districts of the province Tocache in Peru.
