= Transport in Peru =

This article describes the transport in Peru.

== Railways ==
total: 2,374 km (1,475 mi)
standard gauge: 1,608 km (999 mi), 4 ft 8 1/2 in (1,435 mm) gauge
narrow gauge: 380 km (240 mi), 3 ft (914 mm) gauge

There are two unconnected principal railways in Peru.

The Ferrocarril Central Andino (FCCA; the former Ferrocarril Central del Perú) runs inland from Callao and Lima across the Andes watershed to La Oroya and Huancayo. It is the second highest railway in the world (following opening of the Qingzang railway in Tibet), with the Galera summit tunnel under Mount Meiggs at 4,783 m (15,692 ft) and Galera station at 4,777 m (15,673 ft) above sea level. In 1955 the railway opened a spur line from La Cima on the Morococha branch (4,818 m (15,807 ft) above sea level) to Volcán Mine, reaching an (at the time) world record altitude of 4,830 m (15,850 ft). Both branch and spur have since closed to traffic. From Huancayo the route is extended by the Ferrocarril Huancayo-Huancavelica. In July 2006 FCCA began work to regauge the Huancavelica line from 914 mm (3 ft) to 1,435 mm (4 ft 8 1/2 in) standard gauge and it was finished in 2010. There was also a proposal for a 21 km (13 mi) tunnel under the Andes.

The Ferrocarriles del Sur del Perú (FCS), now operated by PeruRail, runs from the coast at Matarani to Cuzco, and to Puno on Lake Titicaca. From Cuzco, PeruRail runs the 914 mm (3 ft) gauge line to Aguas Calientes for Machu Picchu.

Railways in Peru

=== Towns served ===
==== Central railways ====
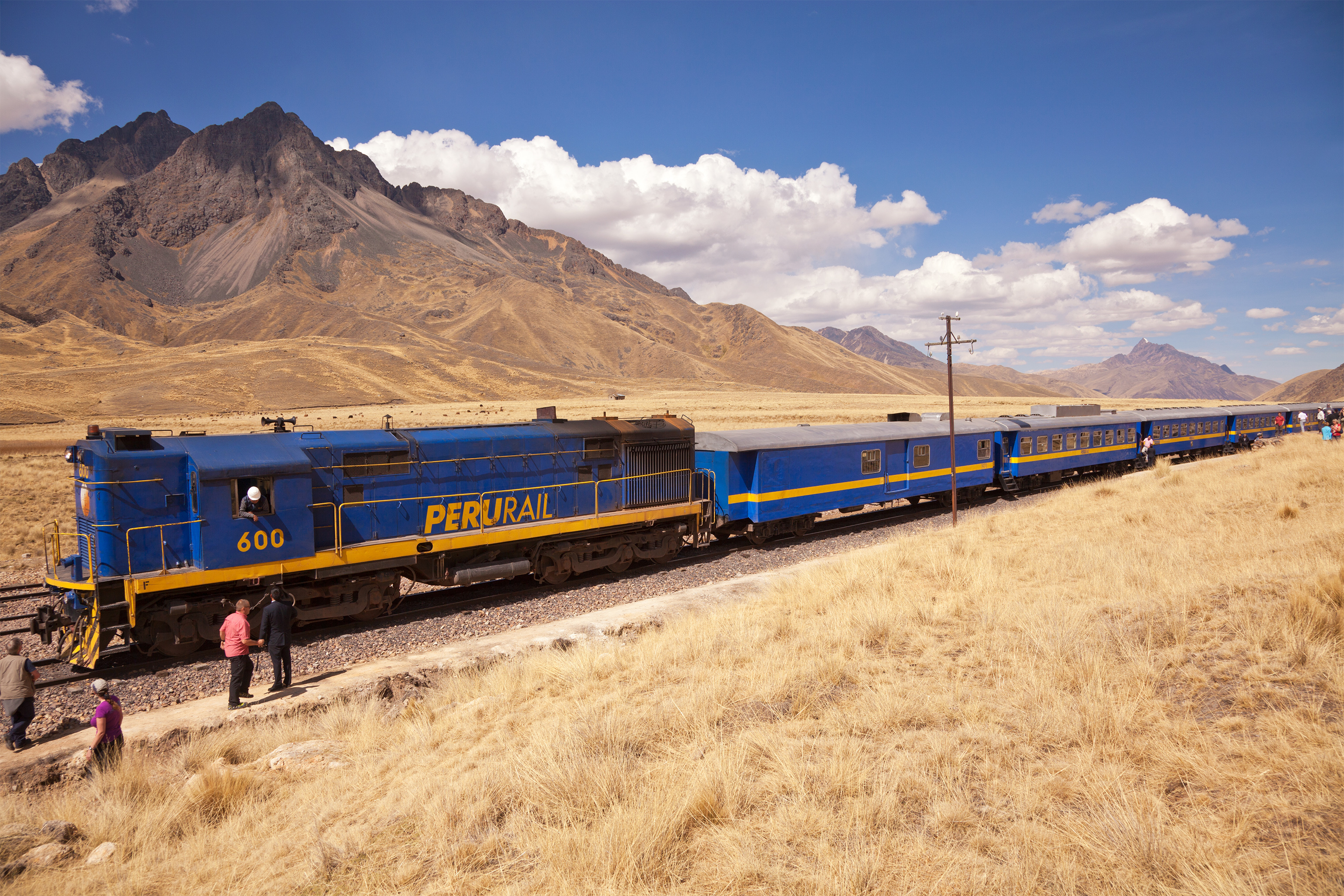
A PeruRail passenger train stopping in La Raya

- Map
- Lima – capital
- Callao – port
- La Oroya – junction
- Huancavelica – provincial capital
- Huancayo – provincial capital
- Cerro de Pasco – provincial capital
- Jauja
- Matucana
- Chosica
- Galera
- Junín
- Mejorada
- Ticlio – former junction
- in March 2009, gauge conversion from Huancayo to Huancavelica from 914 mm (3 ft) to 1,435 mm (4 ft 8 1/2 in) proceeds. By October 2010 it was finished and it is in service now.

==== Southern railway ====
- Matarani – port
- Juliaca – junction
- Juliaca – junction
- Cuzco – break of gauge, start of 3 ft (914 mm)
- Juliaca – junction, via Arequipa – second city
- Puno – railhead on Lake Titicaca
- Cuzco – break of gauge, end of 4 ft 8 1/2 in (1,435 mm) standard gauge
- Aguas Calientes – railhead for Machu Picchu

=== Metro ===
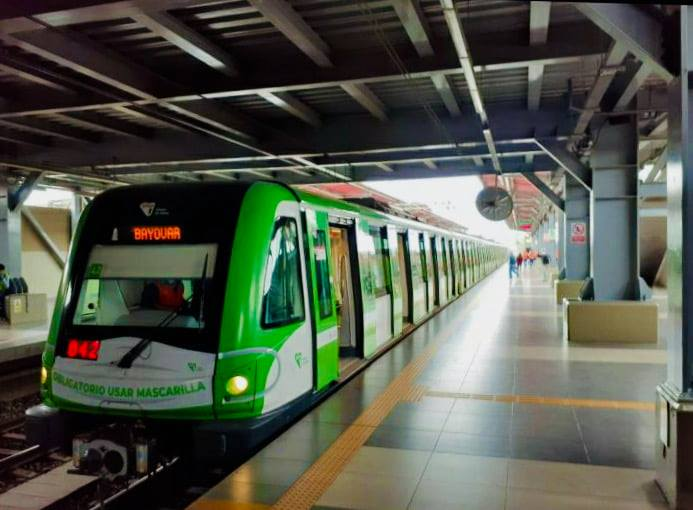
A car in the Villa El Salvador station in Lima

Lima has a metro service or Lima Metro, also called Tren eléctrico that has now only one line (called Linea 1). The line has an extension of 34.6 km (21.5 mi), with 26 stations, and goes from the south east to north east Lima urban districts passing downtown (This is Villa El Salvador to San Juan de Lurigancho). The second line (called Linea 2) is now under construction and will run from the port of Callao to Ate passing downtown too (west to east).(2015).

Huancayo Metro is the second urban rail line in Peru, is located in the Andean city of Huancayo and is currently under construction (2012).

=== Proposed ===
- Mining railway to Bayovar port by 2019. Also to Paita port.
- Cajamarca – mine
- Tren de la Costa

== Highways ==
total: 85,900 km (53,400 mi)
paved: 45,000 km (Of which approximately 350 km of divided multi-line roads)
unpaved: 40,900 km (1999 est.)

The Pan-American Highway runs the country from north to south next to the coast, from Tumbes (Ecuadoran border) to Tacna (Chilean border). From Arequipa a branch goes to Puno and then to Bolivia. Other important highways in Peru are the Longitudinal de la Sierra, that goes from north to south in the highlands; and the Carretera Central, that goes from Lima (in the coast) to Pucallpa (in the jungle).

=== Long distance buses ===
Inter-city travel in Peru is almost exclusively done in long-distance buses. Buses in most of the cities depart from bus terminals called terminal terrestre. The main bus companies that link Lima with the major cities include Cruz del Sur and Ormeño. Other companies are Civa and Oltursa., while the full list of carriers include Transported Libertad and Turismo Mer, among others.

=== Maps ===
- UN Map Dead link
- UNHCR Map for Peru and Ecuador Dead link

== Waterways ==
8,600 km (5,300 mi) of navigable tributaries of Amazon system and 208 km (129 mi) of Lake Titicaca.

There are river boat service from Yurimaguas and Pucallpa to Iquitos, and from there to the Brazilian border in the Amazon River. Touristic boats can be reached at Puno in Lake Titicaca.

== Pipelines ==
- crude oil 800 km
- natural gas and natural gas liquids 64 km

== Ports and harbors ==
Portuary administration in Peru is carried out by the National Port Authority.

=== Pacific Ocean ===
- Callao
- Chimbote
- Ilo
- Matarani
- Paita
- Salaverry
- General San Martín
- Talara

=== Lake Titicaca ===
- Puno

=== Amazon basin ===
- Iquitos
- Pucallpa
- Yurimaguas

== Merchant marine ==
total: 7 ships (1,000 gross tonnage (GT) or over) totaling 65,193 GT/100,584 tonnes deadweight (DWT)
ships by type: (1999 est.)

- bulk carrier 1
- cargo ships 6

== Airports and airlines ==
Airports

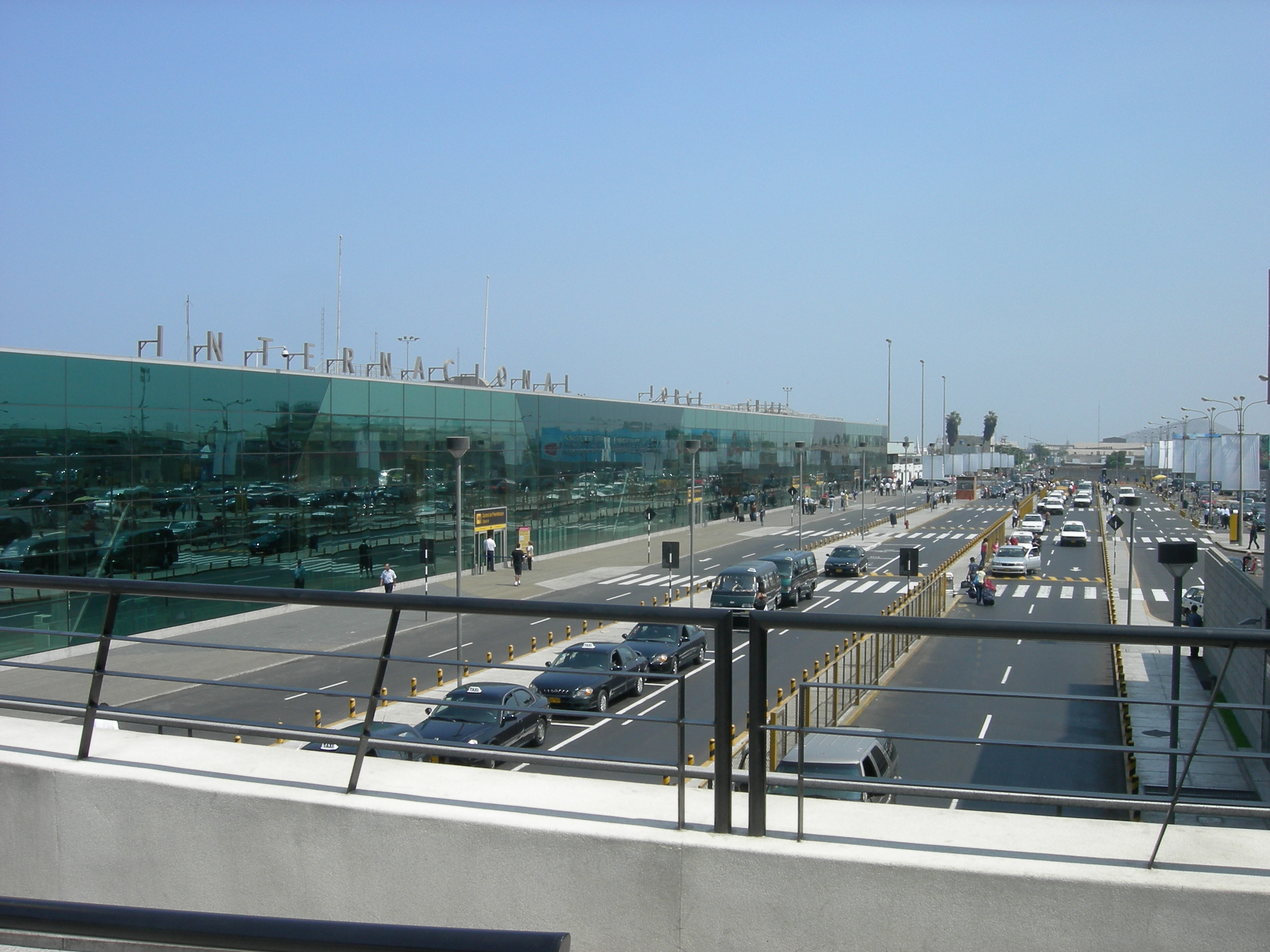
The exterior of Jorge Chavez International airport in 2008

According to a 1999 estimate there are 234 airports in Peru. Jorge Chavez International Airport, in Lima is Peru's main national and international gateway, with an estimate of 98 percent of all international flights into Peru landing at this airport. Other important airports are located in Cusco, Arequipa, Iquitos and Piura.

Airports – with paved runways:
total: 44
over 3,047 m: 7
2,438 to 3,047 m: 17
1,524 to 2,437 m: 12
914 to 1,523 m: 7
under 914 m: 1 (1999 est.)

Airports – with unpaved runways:
total: 190
over 3,047 m: 1
2,438 to 3,047 m: 2
1,524 to 2,437 m: 26
914 to 1,523 m: 67
under 914 m: 94 (1999 est.)

Airlines

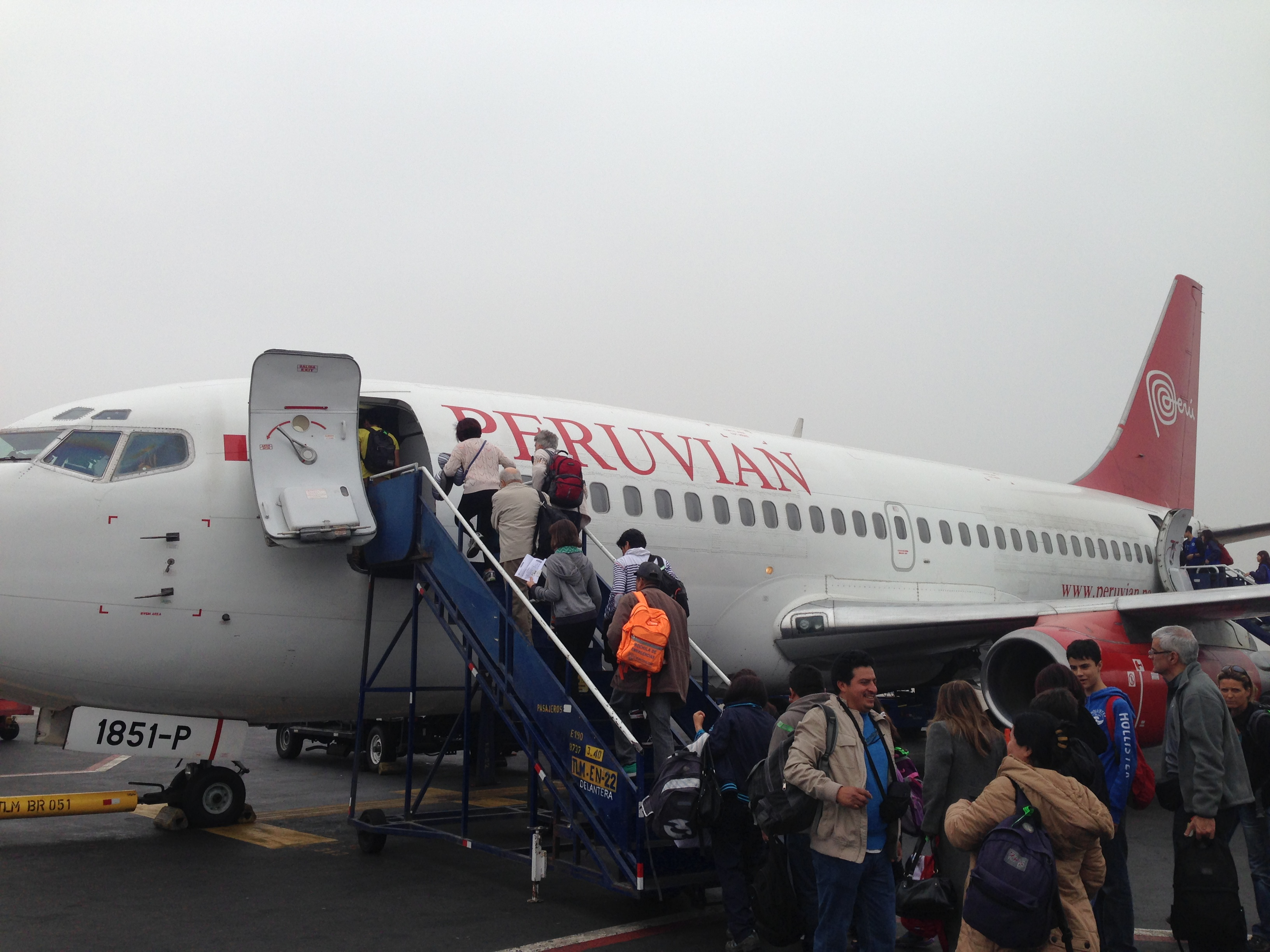
A Peruvian Airlines plane

International airlines connecting Peru with North America, Europe and other Latin American countries include: Delta Air Lines, American Airlines, United Airlines, Air Canada, Iberia, Air France, KLM, LATAM Airlines, Avianca, AeroMexico, and British Airways.
Airlines in Peru with domestic service in Peru include LAN Peru, Star Peru, Peruvian Airlines, and LC Perú. Charter and Cargo airlines include ATSA, Andes Air and Cielos Airlines. Former Peruvian airlines include Aero Continente, AeroPerú and Faucett.

== See also ==
- Rail transport in Peru
