= Glider Ushñahua =

Peruvian politician (1968–2020)

Member of Congress
- In office 28 July 2016 – 30 September 2019
- Constituency: Ucayali

Personal details
- Born: Glider Agustín Ushñahua Huasanga; 26 September 1968 Pucallpa, Peru
- Died: 16 April 2020 (aged 51) Pucallpa, Peru
- Cause of death: COVID-19
- Party: Popular Force (2016–2020)
- Other political affiliations: Popular Action (2005–2015)
- Education: Universidad Continental (Master of Public Administration); Universidad de Huánuco (Bachelor of Laws)

Glider Agustín Ushñahua Huasanga (26 September 1968 – 16 April 2020) was a Peruvian Fujimorist politician who served as a Congressman, representing the Department of Ucayali between 2016 and 2019.

== Early life and career ==
He was born in Pucallpa on 26 September 1968. He completed his primary studies in his hometown and Puerto Esperanza, in Purus Province, on the banks of Purus River, and his secondary studies in Pucallpa.

In 1989, he moved to Huánuco city, where he completed his Bachelor of Laws degree at Universidad de Huánuco, in 1999. He studied Master of Public Administration at Universidad Continental.

In 2007, he was a judge of peace of Nauta District, Loreto Province and Loreto Department and, between 2015 and 2016, he was a rector of Order of Attorneys of Ucayali.

== Political career ==
From 2005 to 2015, he was a member of Popular Action.

In the 2016 elections, he ran for a seat under the Fujimorist Popular Force in the Congress, representing the Department of Ucayali. He won a seat to Congress with 12,234 preferential votes for the 2016-2021 parliamentary period. However, in aftermath of the dissolution of the Congress, decreed by President Martín Vizcarra, his parliamentary term ended on 30 September 2019.

== Death ==
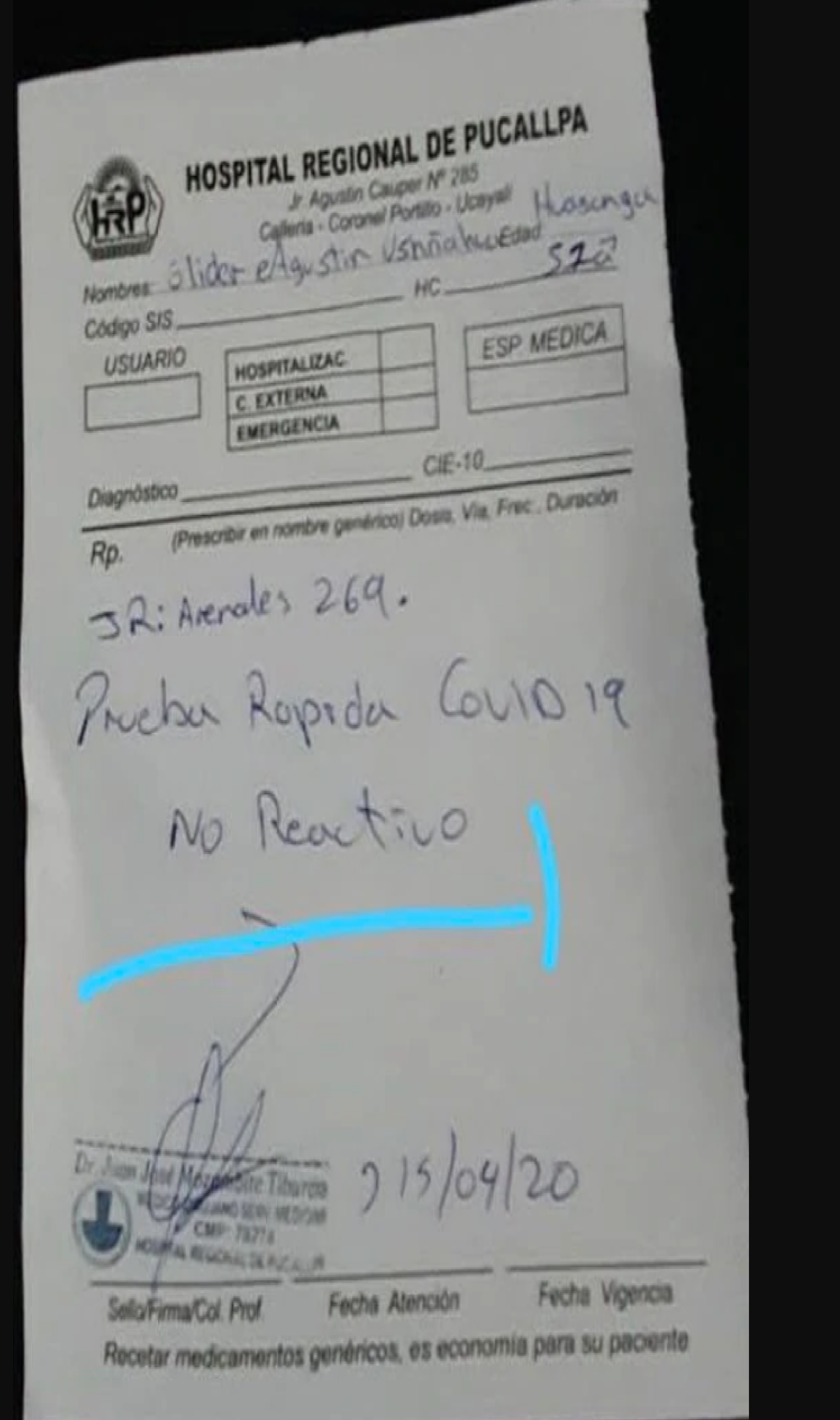
Ushñahua's attestation about his COVID-19 fast test.

He died on 16 April 2020 at EsSalud Hospital in Pucallpa due to respiratory problems caused by COVID-19 during the pandemic of that disease in Peru. His death occurred after he failed a fast test and was denied treatment at the Regional Hospital of Pucallpa and the Amazonian Hospital in Yarinacocha. After that, he went to EsSalud Hospital in the city, where he finally died.
