= Yurúa District =

Coordinates: 9.4833°S 72.7165°W

Yurua
- District
- Interactive map of Yurua
- Country: Peru
- Region: Ucayali
- Province: Atalaya
- Founded: July 2, 1943
- Capital: Breu

Government
  - Mayor: Edwin Hernani Alvarado Lima

Area
  - Total: 9,175.58 km^{2} (3,542.71 sq mi)
- Elevation: 320 m (1,050 ft)

Population (2005 census)
  - Total: 1,255
  - Density: 0.1368/km^{2} (0.3542/sq mi)
- Time zone: UTC-5 (PET)
- UBIGEO: 250204

Yurua District is one of the four districts of the province Atalaya in Peru.
