= Sepahua District =

Coordinates: 11.1470°S 73.0362°W

Sepahua
- District
- Interactive map of Sepahua
- Country: Peru
- Region: Ucayali
- Province: Atalaya
- Founded: June 1, 1982
- Capital: Sepahua
- Subdivisions: 15 populated centers

Government
  - Mayor: Francisco Javier Santillán Tuesta

Area
  - Total: 8,223.63 km^{2} (3,175.16 sq mi)
- Elevation: 276 m (906 ft)

Population (2005 census)
  - Total: 6,696
  - Density: 0.8142/km^{2} (2.109/sq mi)
- Time zone: UTC-5 (PET)
- Website: munisepahua.gob.pe

Sepahua is a district in southern Atalaya Province in Peru. It is bordered by the Junín Region on the west, the district of Raymondi on the north, the Echarate District on the east, and national land on the south.
