= Tahuanía District =

Coordinates: 10°03′46″S 74°00′27″W

Tahuanía District Distrito de Tahunía
- District
- Interactive map of Tahuanía District
- Country: Peru
- Region: Ucayali
- Province: Atalaya
- Founded: July 2, 1943
- Capital: Bolognesi

Government
  - Mayor: Jaime Carrion Vera

Area
  - Total: 7,016.71 km^{2} (2,709.17 sq mi)
- Elevation: 190 m (620 ft)

Population (2005 census)
  - Total: 5,171
  - Density: 0.7370/km^{2} (1.909/sq mi)
- Time zone: UTC-5 (PET)
- UBIGEO: 250203

Tahuanía District is one of the four districts of the province Atalaya in Peru.

The district was created by Law No. 9815 of 2 July 1943, during the government of President Manuel Prado Ugarteche.

In this district of the Peruvian Amazon lives the ethnic Pano group Shipibo-Conibo self-named Joni.
