= Palestina, Peru =

Palestina
- Location within Peru
- Coordinates: 9.4431°S 70.5091°W
- Country: Peru
- Region: Ucayali
- Province: Purús
- District: Purús
- Founded: 1994
- Time zone: UTC-5 (PET)
  - Summer (DST): UTC-5 (PET)

Palestina, Peru is a town in the district and province of Purús in the Ucayali Region of Peru, founded in 1994.

== History ==
Before 1994, Palestina was a set of fields where cattle and crops were raised and people lived in the fields. In 1994 the mayor of Purús Province came to the area to found a town and build homes for any farmers who wished to live there.

== Economy ==
In addition to raising cattle, Palestina grows rice, corn, and fruits: pineapple, banana, coconut, cocona, orange, peach palm, passion fruit, and tangerine.

== Holidays ==
The town celebrates some national holidays: Mother's Day, Father's Day, and Labor Day. They celebrate local anniversaries of the town's founding and the church founding, and they celebrate harvest holidays: watermelon planting, caywa planting, watermelon harvest, and rice harvest.

== Documentary ==
A clip from Web

A documentary featuring Palestina, Peru, has been created under the title Web, in cooperation with the Wikimedia Foundation and A Human Right. It describes the impact of the One Laptop per Child program on Palestina, including showing the children in the school writing the initial version of the Spanish-language version of this Wikipedia page. A 05:13.0 segment from this documentary is available on YouTube.
