= Purús District =

Coordinates: 9°47′55″S 70°45′12″W

Purus District Distrito de Purus
- District
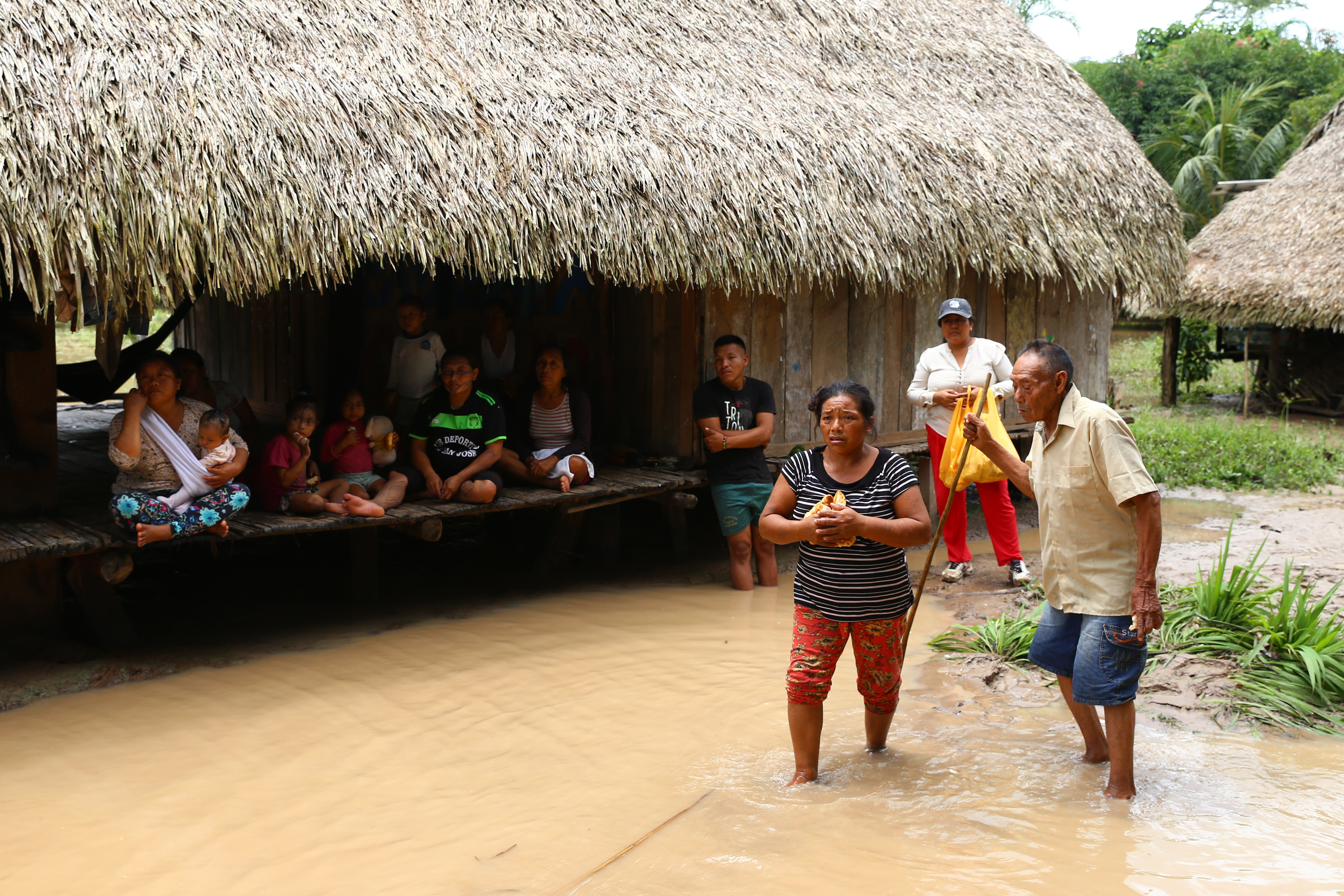

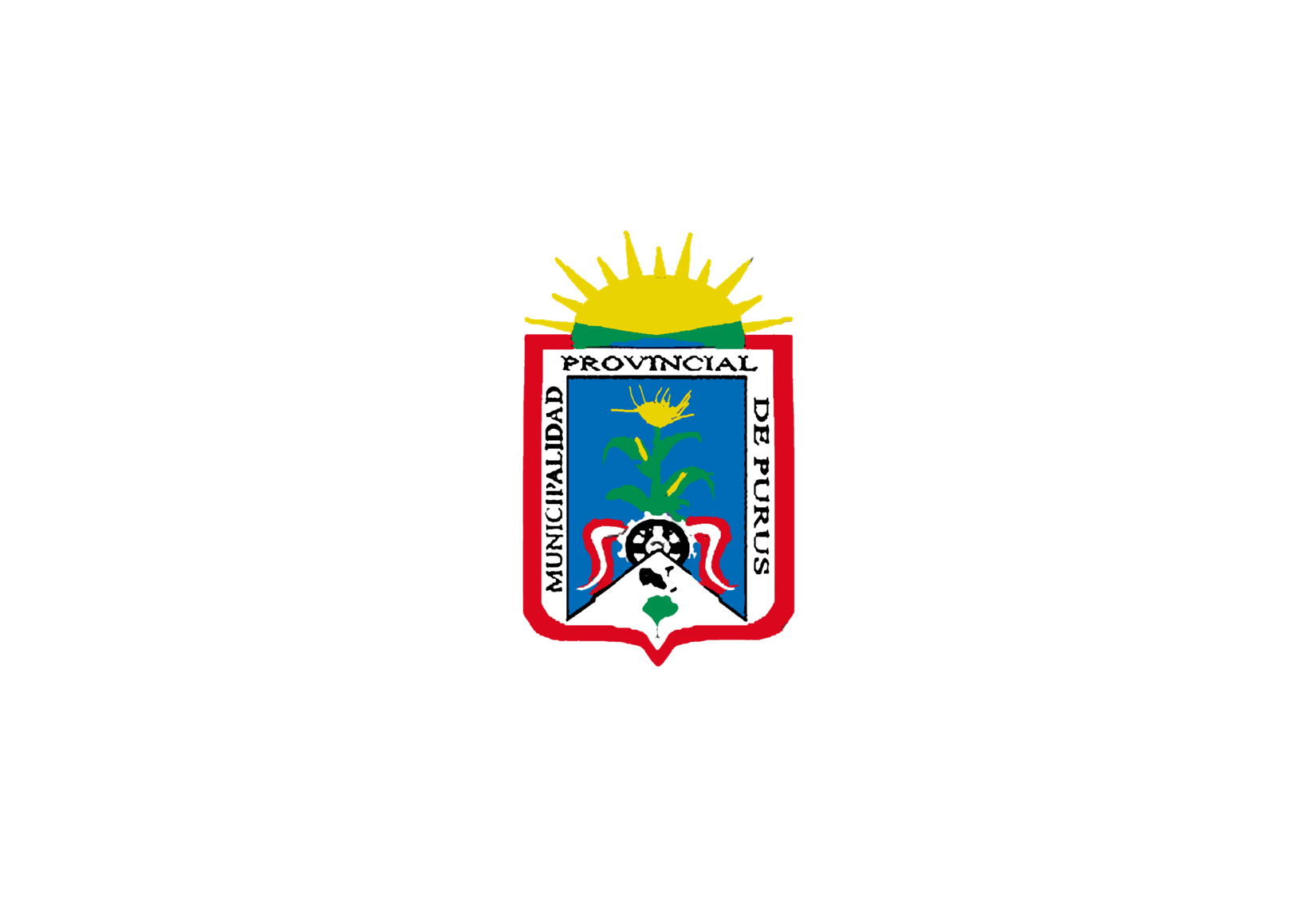
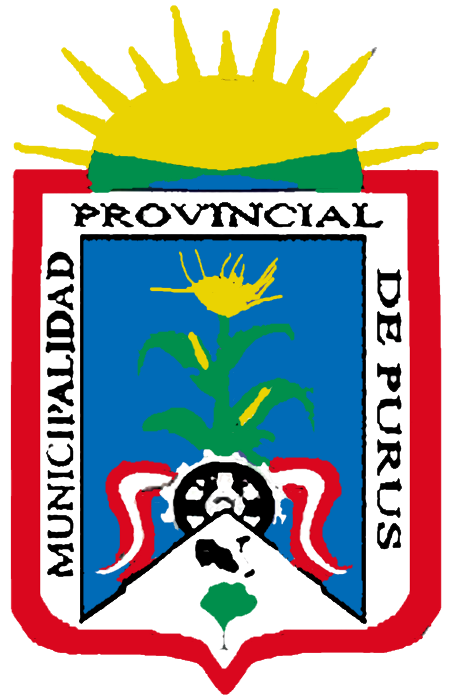
- Flag Coat of arms

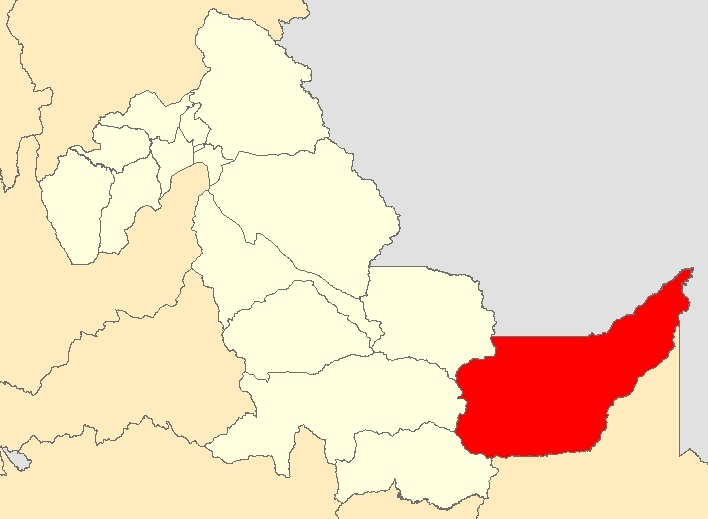
- Location of Purús in Purús Province
- Country: Peru
- Region: Ucayali
- Province: Purús
- Founded: July 2, 1943
- Capital: Esperanza

Government
  - Mayor: Emilio Montes Bardales

Area
  - Total: 17,847.8 km^{2} (6,891.1 sq mi)
- Elevation: 230 m (750 ft)

Population (2005 census)
  - Total: 3,485
  - Density: 0.1953/km^{2} (0.5057/sq mi)
- Time zone: UTC-5 (PET)
- UBIGEO: 250401

Purús District is the only district of the Purús Province located in the Ucayali Region in Peru. The Purus River runs through it.

It includes the town of Palestina.
