= Urarina language =

Isolated language spoken in Peru

Urarina
- Itucale, Simacu
- kachá
- Native to: Peru
- Region: Loreto Region, Urarinas District along the Chambira River
- Ethnicity: Urarina people
- Native speakers: 3,000 (2002)
- Language family: Language isolate: Urarina
- Writing system: Latin

Language codes
- ISO 639-3: ura
- Glottolog: urar1246
- ELP: Urarina
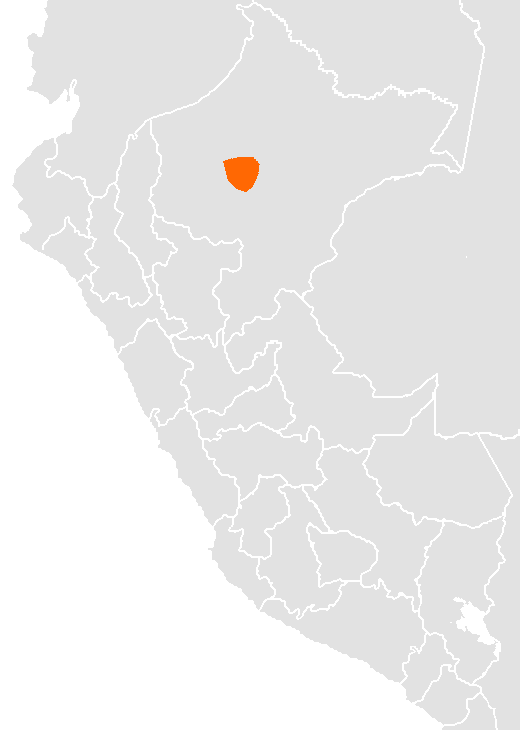

Urarina is a language isolate spoken in Peru, specifically in the Loreto Region of Northwest Peru, by the Urarina people. There are around 3,000 speakers in Urarinas District (along the Chambira River). It uses the Latin script. It is also known as Itucali, Simacu or Shimacu.

It has the rare canonical word order of object–verb–subject.

== Dialects ==
There are four Urarina dialect zones:

- Zone A (western area, including Tigrillo and Espejo)
- Zone B (Lower Chambira dialects, including the Asna and Airico Rivers)
- Zone C (Upper Chambira and all of its tributaries)
- Zone D (Corrientes)

== Language contact ==
Jolkesky (2016) notes that there are lexical similarities with the Arawak, Leko, and Omurano language families due to contact.

== Status ==
Urarina is currently spoken by the 2,000–3,000 members of the Urarina tribe, the majority of whom have retained the ability to speak the language. However, bilingualism and use of Spanish in everyday life is on the rise, as more and more Spanish-speaking mestizos have immigrated to the valley where the Urarina live. While there is a bilingual education system, most bilingual schools almost exclusively use Spanish, as the majority of the teachers do not speak Urarina. The version of Urarina that is spoken by younger generations has lost a substantial degree of grammatical complexity and vocabulary, as correlated to the loss of traditional cultural practices and beliefs. The language is considered potentially endangered.

== Phonology ==
The following is the phonology of Urarina as described by Olawsky.

=== Consonants ===
		Labial	Dental	Retroflex	Palatal	Velar		Glottal	
		Labial	Dental	Retroflex	Palatal	plain	labial	plain	palatal
Nasal		/m/	/n/		ng /ɲ/				
Stop	Voiceless		/t/		ts /t͡ɕ/	/k/	kw /kʷ/		
Stop	Voiced	/b/	/d/						
Fricative		fw /fʷ/	/s/		sh /ʃ/			/h/	hj /hʲ/
Approximant			/l/	r /ɽ/					

=== Vowels ===
	Front	Central	Back
Close	/i/	/ʉ/	/u/
Mid	/e/		
Open		/a/	

Orthography is only written where it differs from IPA

== Grammar ==
Urarina has several rare grammatical characteristics. The language follows the OVS word order: of all the languages that use OVS word order, Urarina is among the strictest adherents to this word order in speech. Another feature of Urarina is its complex system on all verbs (excluding borrowings). Every verb is marked according to one of three paradigms, as determined by a complicated set of pragmatic and syntactic conditions.

Urarina follows a similarly unique word class system. Numerals and adjectives that are borrowed from Quechua and Spanish are placed in a completely separate class from indigenous Urarina words. Urarina also follows syntactic rules wherein the pitch-accent system changes the tone of a word, based on the preceding word class. The language's set of unique features has recently garnered special attention from linguists. However, Urarina's distinctive grammatical features are gradually disappearing as younger generations speak a Urarina that is being influenced by a growing bilingualism in Spanish.

Like many other Amazonian languages, Urarina follows a polysynthetic, agglutinative word morphology in relating to verbs.

== See also ==
- Pano-Tacanan languages
