= Sarameriza =

City in Loreto, Peru

Coordinates: 4.5656°S 77.4158°W

Saramiriza
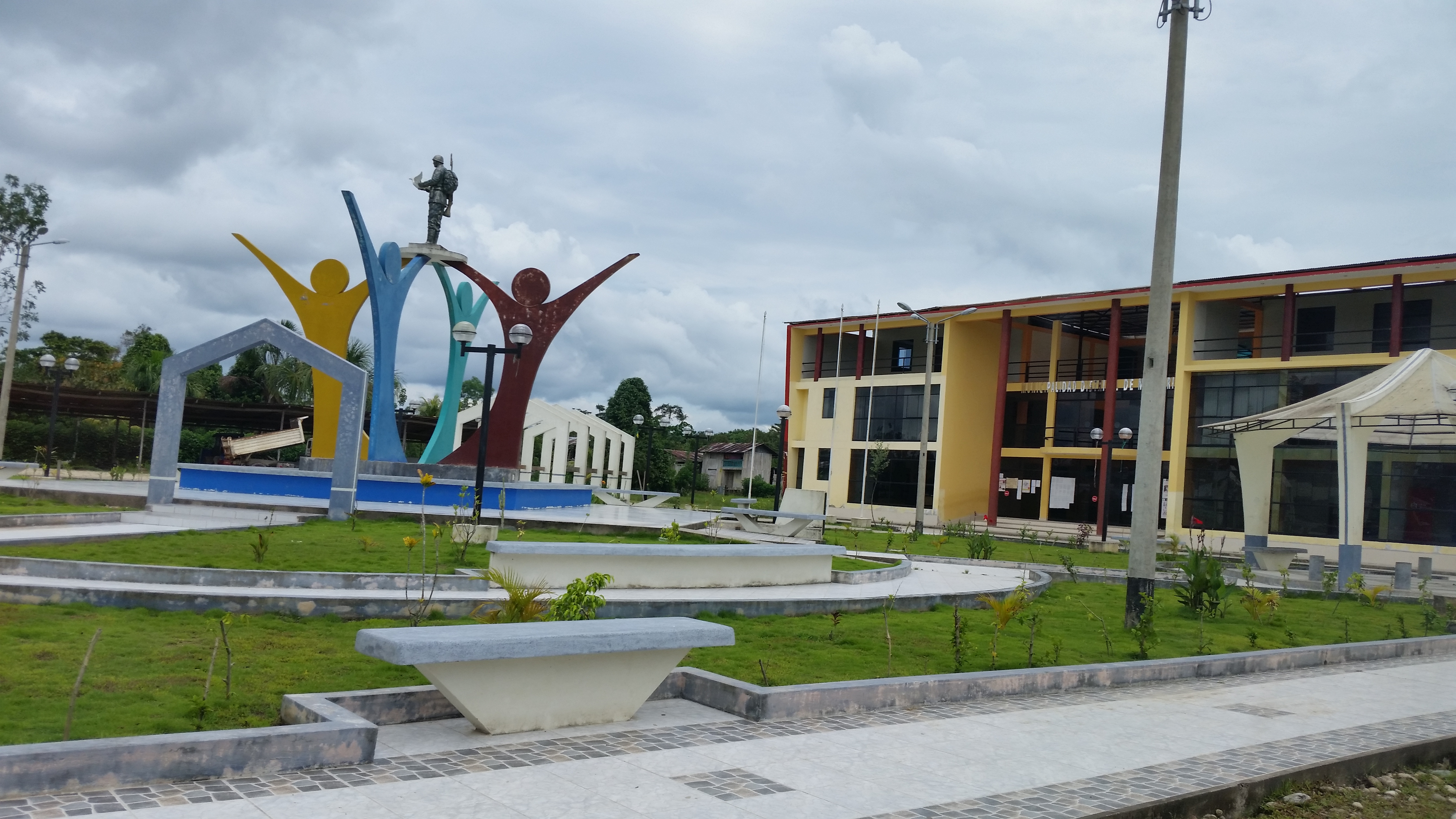
- Main square in Saramiriza
- Interactive map of Saramiriza
- Country: Peru
- Department: Loreto
- Province: Datem del Marañón
- District: Manseriche

Population
  - Total: 2,000
- Demonym(s): Saramirizano, -na
- Time zone: UTC-5 (PET)

Sarameriza is a small fluvial port in the department of Loreto. Its place is strategic since it is immediately after the Pongo de Manseriche and therefore it is the first navigable point on the Marañón River on the way to the Amazon River and therefore the city of Iquitos and the border with Brazil. It is located at: 4°33'58.34"S, 77°25'0.98"W, according to Google Earth.

== History ==
After the 1995 Cenepa War and the signing of the Brasilia Presidential Act, both signatory countries agreed to grant Ecuador two territories in Pijuayal and Saramiriza for 50 years, where Trade and Navigation Centers (Spanish: Centros de Comercio y Navegación, CECONA) would be established in order to provide the country an outlet to the Amazon River. Protests from local tribes have slowed down the process, however.

== See also ==
- Pijuayal
