= Puerto Esperanza =

Puerto Esperanza may refer to:

- Puerto Esperanza, Misiones, a village and municipality in Misiones Province in north-eastern Argentina
- Esperanza, Ucayali, also known as Puerto Esperanza, a town in Peru, capital of Purús Province in Ucayali Region
  - Puerto Esperanza Airport serving the town Esperanza, Ucayali, Peru
