= Miss Perú 1985 =

- Date: May 11, 1985
- Presenters: Jorge Beleván, Silvia Maccera
- Venue: Coliseo Amauta
- Broadcaster: Panamericana Televisión
- Entrants: 22
- Winner: María Gracia Galleno; Ucayali

The Miss Perú 1985 pageant was held on May 11, 1985. That year, 22 candidates were competing for the national crown. The chosen winner represented Peru at the Miss Universe 1985. The rest of the finalists would enter in different pageants.

== Placements ==
Final Results	Contestant
Miss Peru Universe 1985	Ucayali - María Gracia Galleno
Miss Peru Asia-Pacific 1985	Distrito Capital – Liliana Tapia Castillo
1st Runner-Up	Pasco - Miluska Newmann
Top 6	Huancavelica - Gretel Cornejo; Callao - Ana María Arce; Ancash - Verónica Vivanco

.

== Special awards ==
- Best Regional Costume - Ancash - Verónica Vivanco
- Miss Photogenic - Callao - Ana María Arce
- Miss Elegance - Pasco - Miluska Newmann
- Miss Body - Piura - Bárbara Vásquez
- Best Hair - Distrito Capital – Liliana Tapia
- Miss Congeniality - Ica - Edith Schever
- Miss Popularity - Callao - Ana María Arce (by votes of readers of CARETAS Magazine)

.

== Delegates ==
- Amazonas - Maruxia Garfias
- Áncash - Verónica Vivanco
- Arequipa - Maritza Pretto
- Cajamarca - Elsa Cáceres
- Callao - Ana María Arce
- Cuzco - Lucy Morales
- Distrito Capital - Liliana Tapia Castillo
- Huancavelica - Gretel Cornejo
- Huánuco - Elsa Ribera Sara
- Ica - Edith Schever
- Junín - Brigitte Vogier
- La Libertad - Ma. Luisa Benavides
- Lambayeque - Mónica Campos
- Loreto - Gladys Cárdenas
- Madre de Dios - Luisa Marina Burgos
- Pasco - Miluska Newmann
- Piura - Bárbara Vásquez
- Puno - Jaqueline Pinto
- San Martín - Lorena Luque
- Tacna - María Lucila Escandon
- Tumbes - Patricia Olavarría
- Ucayali - María Gracia Galleno

.

== Judges ==
- Jaime Andrade - Manager of Toyota
- Noemi Ivcher - Peruvian Designer
- Jorge Galarcep - Regional Manager of Discos Hispanos
- Emily Kreimer - Peruvian Actress
- Germán Kraus - Soap Opera Actor
- Susana Vieira - Brazilian Actress
- Benjamín Chávez Valderrama - Peruvian Bodybuilder & Owner of BENZ Gym
- Gloria Pires - Brazilian Actress
- Monica Brenner - Manager of Discos "El Virrey"
- Magnolia Martínez - Miss Peru 1971 (Miss Congeniality Universe)
- Dr. César Morillas - Plastic Surgeon
- Mario Cavagnaro - Creative Director of Panamericana Televisión

.

== Background Music ==
- Opening Show – Los Violines de Lima - "Campesina" (Composed by Pedro Espinel)
- Swimsuit Competition – "Sitting Pretty" (Instrumental) (Composed by John Kander & Fred Ebb)
- Evening Gown Competition – Herb Alpert & The Tijuana Brass - "Passion Play"
- Special Guest Singer - Fausto - "Susana"

.
