= San Lorenzo, Loreto =

City in Peru

Coordinates: 4.8307°S 76.5543°W

San Lorenzo is a city in the Loreto Region in northeastern Peru. It is the capital of both Datem del Marañón Province and Barranca District. In 2006, San Lorenzo recorded a population of 6,034.
