= Pijuayal =

City in Loreto, Peru

- Interactive map of Pijuayal
- Country: Peru
- Department: Loreto
- Province: Mariscal Ramón Castilla
- District: Pebas

Population
  - Total: 1,500
- Demonym(s): Pijuayalino, -na
- Time zone: UTC-5 (PET)

Pijuayal is a town in Pebas District, Mariscal Ramón Castilla Province, Loreto, Peru. It is located at: 3°19′37.67″ S, 71°50′22.54″ W, according to Google Earth.

== History ==
After the 1995 Cenepa War and the signing of the Brasilia Presidential Act, both signatory countries agreed to grant Ecuador two territories in Pijuayal and Saramiriza for 50 years, where Trade and Navigation Centers (Spanish: Centros de Comercio y Navegación, CECONA) would be established in order to provide the country an outlet to the Amazon River. Protests from local tribes have slowed town the process, however.

== See also ==
- Saramiriza
