= Pastaza District =

Coordinates: 4.6516°S 76.5878°W

- District
- Interactive map of Pastaza District
- Country: Peru
- Region: Loreto
- Province: Datem del Marañón
- Founded: July 2, 1943
- Capital: Ullpayacu

Area
  - Total: 8,918.24 km^{2} (3,443.35 sq mi)
- Elevation: 120 m (390 ft)

Population (2005 census)
  - Total: 6,148
  - Density: 0.6894/km^{2} (1.785/sq mi)
- Time zone: UTC-5 (PET)
- UBIGEO: 160705

Pastaza District is one of six districts of the province Datem del Marañón in Peru.
