= Cahuapanas District =

Coordinates: 5.2493°S 77.5438°W

Cahuapanas
- District
- Interactive map of Cahuapanas
- Country: Peru
- Region: Loreto
- Province: Datem del Marañón
- Founded: February 7, 1866
- Capital: Santa María de Cahuapanas

Area
  - Total: 4,982.93 km^{2} (1,923.92 sq mi)
- Elevation: 168 m (551 ft)

Population (2005 census)
  - Total: 7,334
  - Density: 1.472/km^{2} (3.812/sq mi)
- Time zone: UTC-5 (PET)
- UBIGEO: 160204

Cahuapanas District is one of six districts of the province Datem del Marañón in Peru.

The Cahuapana language is spoken in the district.
