= SPEP =

SPEP may refer to:

- Serum protein electrophoresis (SPEP or SPE)
- Society for Phenomenology and Existential Philosophy
- Puerto Esperanza Airport (ICAO: SPEP)
