= Tnte. Gral. Gerardo Pérez Pinedo Airport =

Airport in Peru

Lieutenant General Gerardo Pérez Pinedo Airport Aeropuerto Tnte. Gral. Gerardo Pérez Pinedo
- IATA: AYX; ICAO: SPAY

Summary
- Airport type: Public
- Operator: CORPAC S.A.
- Serves: Atalaya, Ucayali Region, Peru
- Elevation AMSL: 751 ft (229 m)
- Coordinates: 10°43′45″S 73°46′00″W

Map
- Location of the airport in Peru

Runways
Direction	Length		Surface
Direction	m	ft	Surface
05/23	1,504	4,934	Asphalt
- Source: WAD GCM Google Maps

Lieutenant General Gerardo Pérez Pinedo Airport (IATA: AYX, ICAO: SPAY) is a small regional airport serving the town of Atalaya, in the Ucayali Region of Peru. The town is at the confluence of the Tambo and Ucayali Rivers.

The airport name in Spanish is Aeropuerto Teniente General Gerardo Pérez Pinedo, with Teniente General often abbreviated as Tnte. Gral. The airport is currently served by one scheduled airline, and it receives also private and charter flights.

The Atalaya non-directional beacon (Ident: LAY) is located 0.5 kilometres (0.31 mi) northwest of the runway.

== Airlines and destinations ==
Airlines	Destinations
Saeta Peru	Pucallpa

== See also ==
- Transport in Peru
- List of airports in Peru
