= Urarinas District =

Coordinates: 4.5793°S 75.3107°W

Urarinas
- District
- Interactive map of Urarinas
- Country: Peru
- Region: Loreto
- Province: Loreto
- Founded: July 2, 1943
- Capital: Concordia

Area
  - Total: 15,778.4 km^{2} (6,092.1 sq mi)
- Elevation: 112 m (367 ft)

Population (2005 census)
  - Total: 12,025
  - Density: 0.76212/km^{2} (1.9739/sq mi)
- Time zone: UTC-5 (PET)
- UBIGEO: 160305

Urarinas District is one of five districts of the province Loreto in Peru. In addition to Jivaroan-speaking peoples, a major indigenous Amazonian group residing in this district is the Urarina people.
