= Parinari District =

Coordinates: 4.5718°S 74.7439°W

Parinari
- District
- Interactive map of Parinari
- Country: Peru
- Region: Loreto
- Province: Loreto
- Founded: February 7, 1866
- Capital: Parinari

Government
  - Mayor: Víctor Manuel García Acosta

Area
  - Total: 12,951.7 km^{2} (5,000.7 sq mi)
- Elevation: 107 m (351 ft)

Population (2005 census)
  - Total: 7,394
  - Density: 0.5709/km^{2} (1.479/sq mi)
- Time zone: UTC-5 (PET)
- UBIGEO: 160302

Parinari District is one of five districts of the province Loreto in Peru.
