= Atalaya province =

Atalaya
- Province
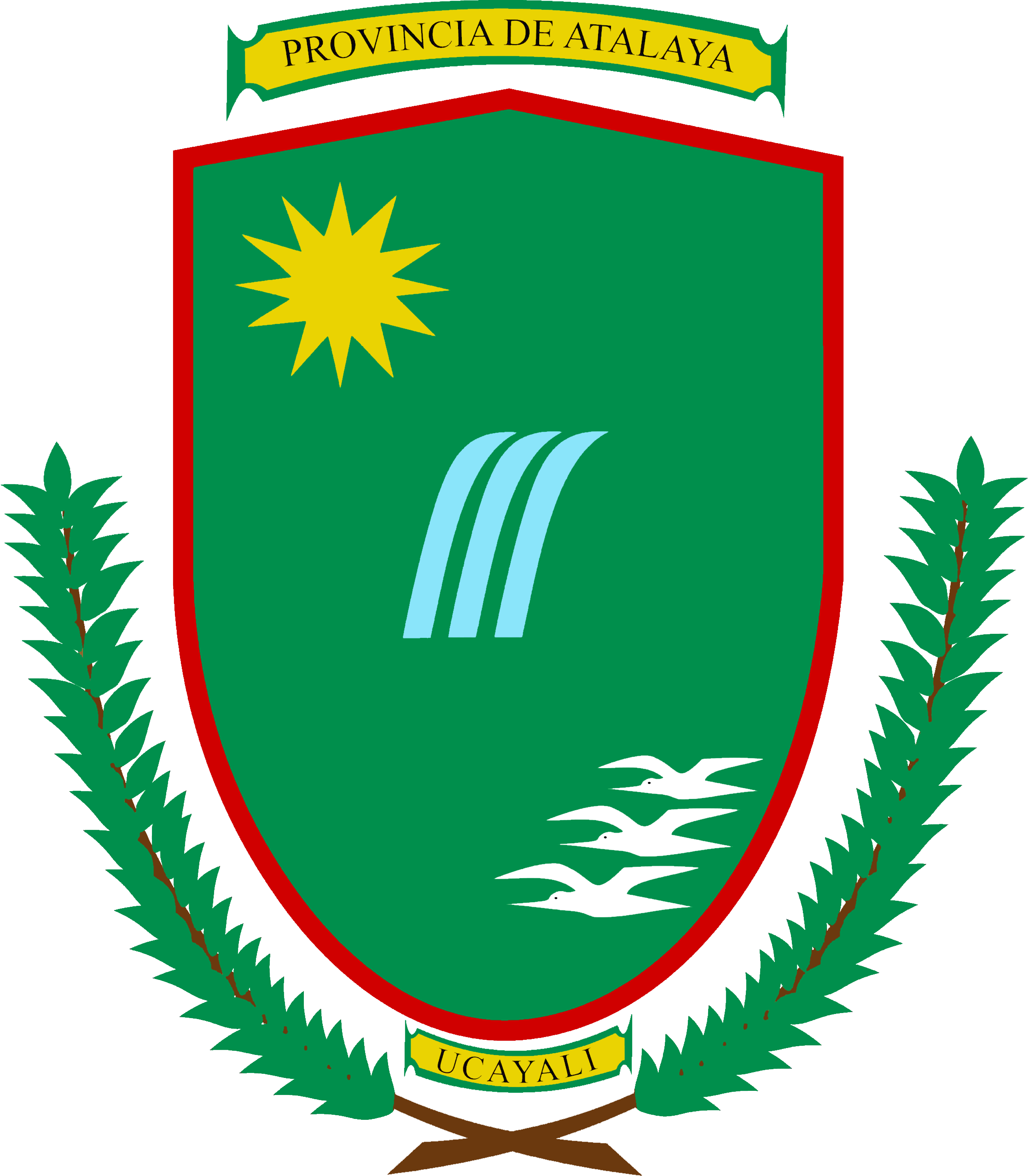
- Coat of arms

- Location of Atalaya in the Ucayali Region
- Coordinates: 10°21′S 73°09′W
- Country: Peru
- Region: Ucayali
- Founded: June 1, 1982
- Capital: Atalaya

Government
  - Mayor: Francisco De Asis Mendoza De Souza (2007)

Area
  - Total: 38,924.43 km^{2} (15,028.81 sq mi)

Population, 2007 census
  - Total: 43,933
  - Density: 1.1287/km^{2} (2.9233/sq mi)
- UBIGEO: 2502
- Website: muniatalaya.gob.pe

Atalaya is the largest of four provinces in the Ucayali Region, in the central Amazon rainforest of Peru.

== Languages ==
According to the 2007 census, Spanish was spoken as a first language by 49.1% of the population, while 37.0% spoke Asháninka, 1.7% spoke Quechua, 0.2% spoke Aymara, 11.9% spoke other indigenous languages and 0.1% spoke foreign languages.

== Political division ==
The province is divided into four districts (Spanish: distritos, singular: distrito), each of which is headed by a mayor (alcalde). The districts, with their capitals in parentheses, are:

- Raymondi (Atalaya)
- Sepahua (Sepahua)
- Tahuania (Bolognesi)
- Yurua (Breu)

== Places of interest ==
- El Sira Communal Reserve
- Gran Pajonal
