= Nauta District =

Coordinates: 4.4800°S 73.6327°W

Nauta
- District
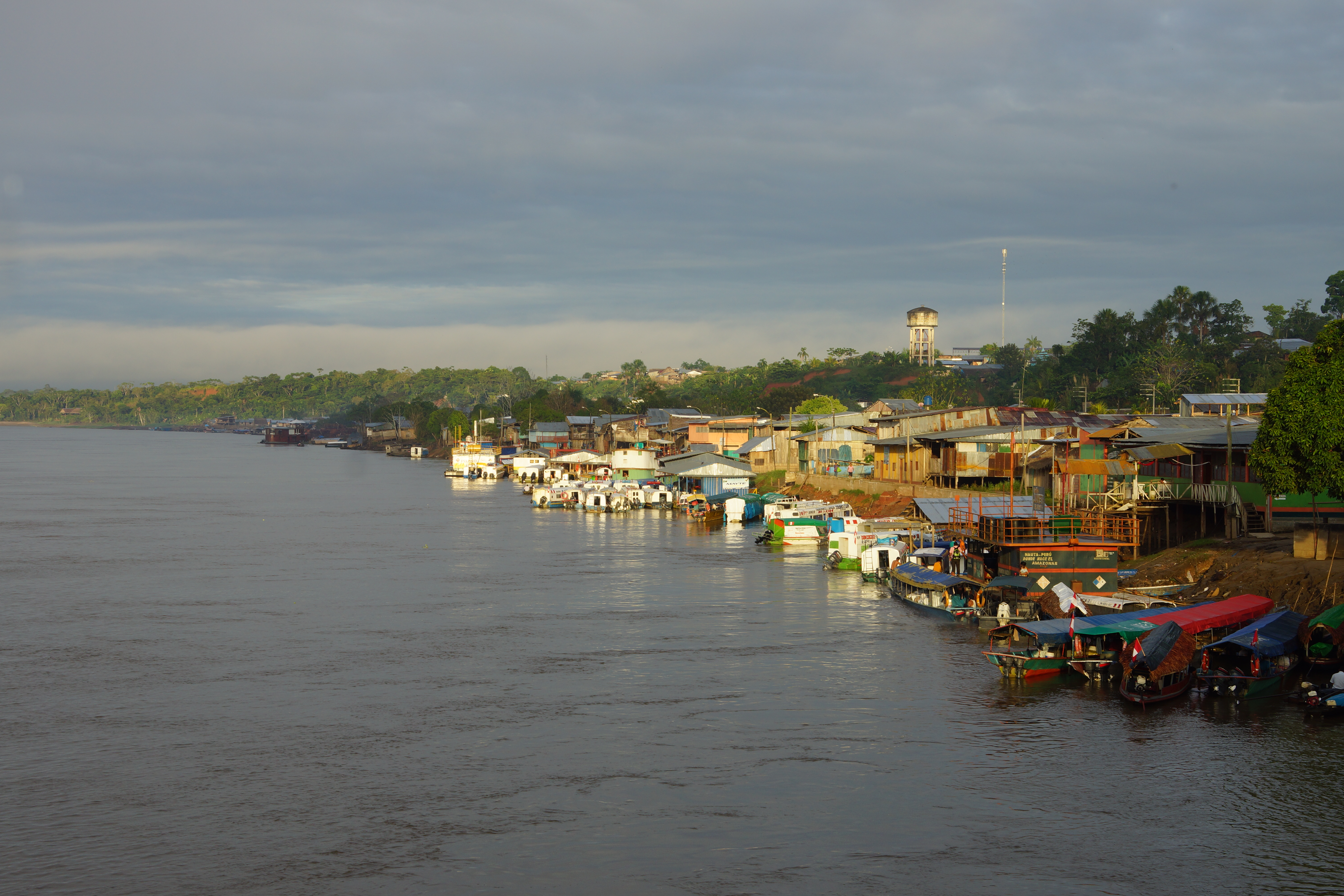
- Nauta
- Interactive map of Nauta
- Country: Peru
- Region: Loreto
- Province: Loreto
- Founded: January 2, 1857
- Capital: Nauta

Area
  - Total: 6,672.35 km^{2} (2,576.21 sq mi)
- Elevation: 111 m (364 ft)

Population (2005 census)
  - Total: 29,859
  - Density: 4.4750/km^{2} (11.590/sq mi)
- Time zone: UTC-5 (PET)
- UBIGEO: 160301

Nauta District is one of five districts of the province Loreto in Peru.

== Climate ==
Climate data for Nauta, elevation 101 m (331 ft), (1991–2020)
Month	Jan	Feb	Mar	Apr	May	Jun	Jul	Aug	Sep	Oct	Nov	Dec	Year
Mean daily maximum °C (°F)	31.1 (88.0)	31.2 (88.2)	30.9 (87.6)	30.9 (87.6)	30.6 (87.1)	30.5 (86.9)	30.5 (86.9)	31.3 (88.3)	32.0 (89.6)	32.0 (89.6)	31.6 (88.9)	31.2 (88.2)	31.2 (88.1)
Mean daily minimum °C (°F)	22.5 (72.5)	22.6 (72.7)	22.5 (72.5)	22.6 (72.7)	22.5 (72.5)	22.0 (71.6)	21.6 (70.9)	21.8 (71.2)	22.1 (71.8)	22.5 (72.5)	22.6 (72.7)	22.5 (72.5)	22.3 (72.2)
Average precipitation mm (inches)	243.1 (9.57)	230.5 (9.07)	259.8 (10.23)	224.7 (8.85)	316.5 (12.46)	155.0 (6.10)	141.7 (5.58)	132.3 (5.21)	166.4 (6.55)	217.7 (8.57)	237.2 (9.34)	261.0 (10.28)	2,585.9 (101.81)
Source: National Meteorology and Hydrology Service of Peru
