= Atalaya, Ucayali =

Atalaya Villa Atalaya
- Town
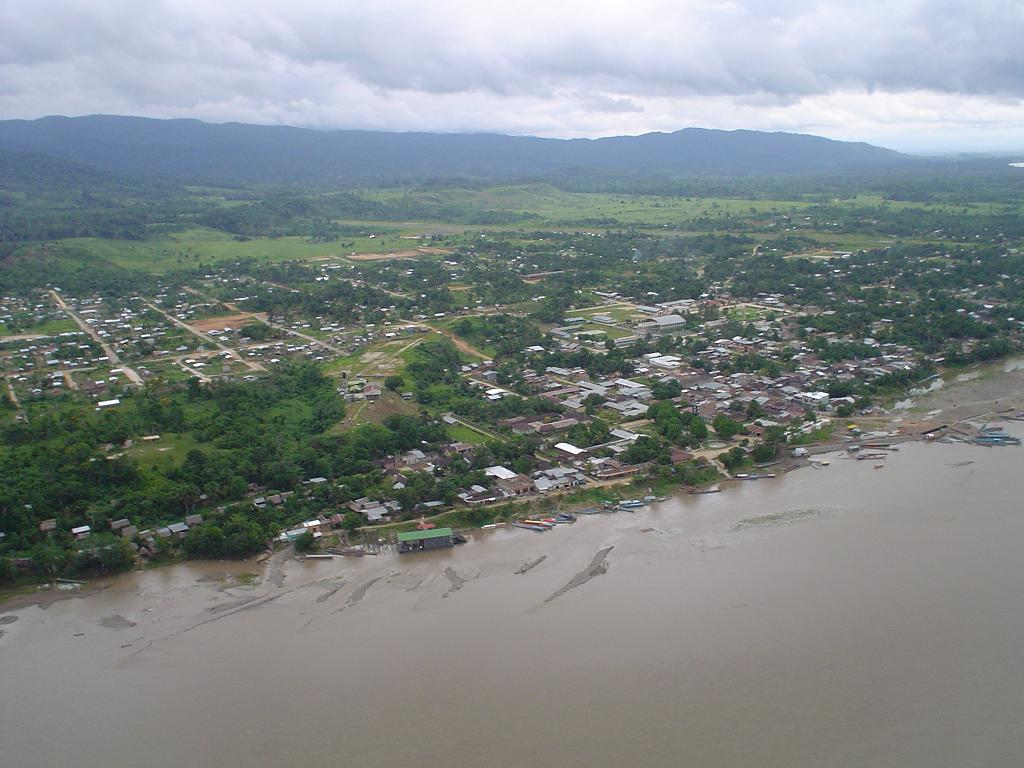
- Aerial view of Atalaya
- Nickname: La Esmeralda del Ucayali (The Emerald of Ucayali)
- Location within Peru
- Coordinates: 10°44′S 73°45′W
- Country: Peru
- Region: Ucayali Region
- Province: Atalaya Province
- District: Raymondi District

Atalaya is a town in the Ucayali Region of Peru. It is the capital of the Atalaya Province and the Raymondi District. It is located where the Tambo and Urubamba Rivers converge to form the Ucayali River.

It is served by the Tnte. Gral. Gerardo Pérez Pinedo Airport.
