= Fernando de Trazegnies =

Peruvian legal scholar, diplomat, historian, writer, and professor

- 5th Marquis de Torrebermeja and 7th Count of Las Lagunas

Minister of Foreign Affairs of Peru
- In office 1998–2000

Dean of the Law School at Pontifical Catholic University of Peru
- In office 1976–1987

Ambassador of the Sovereign Military Order of Malta to Peru
- In office 1995–1998

Personal details
- Born: Ferdinand Carlos Léopold de Trazegnies Granda; 3 September 1935 (age 90) Lima, Peru
- Education: Pontifical Catholic University of Peru, Sorbonne University

Ferdinand Carlos Léopold de Trazegnies Granda, 5th Marquis de Torrebermeja and 7th Count of Las Lagunas (born 3 September 1935, Lima), better known as Fernando de Trazegnies, is a Peruvian legal scholar, diplomat, historian, writer and professor. He was Minister of Foreign Affairs of Peru between 1998 and 2000.

== Biography ==
Born in Lima on 3 September 1935, de Trazegnies is the eldest son of María-Rosa Granda y Vásquez de Velasco, 4th Marquise of Torrebermeja, and Ferdinand de Trazegnies. While his mother was a member of the old Spanish nobility established in Peru since the Spanish era, his father was a Belgian diplomat and genealogist, born in Brussels and attaché of the legation in Lima. He was baptised in Miraflores on October 13 of the same year.

Trazegnies is of Quechua descent through the Vásquez de Velasco, his maternal family, which was a topic of conversation between his father and writers José de la Riva Agüero and Raúl Porras Barrenechea. The origin of this branch is believed to be that of Inés Huaylas Yupanqui, the daughter of Huayna Cápac.

He was educated at the Jesuit Inmaculada School and the School of Law of the Pontifical Catholic University of Peru, where he obtained his BA in 1960. From 1964 to 1965 while pursuing a doctorate degree, he studied philosophy of law at the Sorbonne University, where he was a disciple of Michel Villey. Upon his return to Peru, he was named associate professor and taught philosophy of law and general theory of law at the Catholic University and since 1965 he practiced as an attorney with the Olaechea law firm. In 1979, he obtained a doctor's degree from the Catholic University.

In 1971, he was a visiting scholar at Harvard Law School, where he researched on philosophy of law. Upon his return in 1973, he founded his own law firm De Trazegnies & Trelles and reincorporated to the Catholic University. In 1976, he was elected Dean of the School of Law, a post he occupied for eleven years until 1987. In this year, de Trazegnies published his main work on torts ("La responsabilidad extracontractual") and a year later he was named principal professor.

From 1973 to 1984, de Trazegnies was a member of the Civil Code Reform Commission. He was also legal adviser to the Minister of Energy and Mines in 1973 and the Minister of Justice in 1984 and a member of the Ucchuracay Commission chaired by Mario Vargas Llosa in 1983 and the Arbitration Act Drafting Commission in 1988.

In 1995, the Peruvian Government appointed him Special Envoy Ambassador to the United Kingdom, France and Belgium to explain the Peruvian position in the Cenepa War against Ecuador. The next year, he was appointed Representative to the Permanent Court of Arbitration in The Hague and two years later President Fujimori designated him chair of a committee to negotiate the peace with Ecuador and Minister of Foreign Affairs. In this capacity, de Trazegnies negotiated the Brasilia Presidential Act which put an end to the conflict in 1998.

Associated himself with the Spanish firm Uría Menéndez, he founded De Trazegnies & Uría in 1998 and founded his own law firm in 2000. In domestic and international arbitration, he has acted as chairman of several tribunals and legal expert and arbitrator in ICC and ICSID cases.

A member of the Sovereign Military Order of Malta, he was Ambassador of the Order to Peru from 1995 to 1998. He was also Vice President, President and Chancellor of the Peruvian Association of the Order in different times between 1985 and 2013.

De Trazegnies is a numerary member of the Peruvian Academy of Language and the Peruvian Academy of Jurisprudence and a corresponding member of the Royal Academy of History and the National Academy of History of Argentina.

== Works ==
- 1988 – La responsabilidad extracontractual (Torts, 2 Volumes)
- 1992 – La familia en el derecho peruano (Family in Peruvian Law)
- 1992 – La Idea del Derecho en el Perú Republicano del Siglo XIX (The Idea of Law in the 19th Century Republican Peru)
- 1992 – Imágenes rotas (Broken Images)
- 1993 – Posmodernidad y derecho (Posmodernism and Law)
- 1995 – En el país de las colinas de arena (In the Land of Sand Hills)
- 1999 – Para leer el Código Civil (How to Read the Civil Code, 2 Volumes)
- 2001 – La historia de Gillion de Trazegnies y de Dama Marie, su mujer (novela belga del S. XV) (The Story of Gillion de Trazegnies and Dame Marie, his wife)
