= Semi-mobile =

Ethnological term

Semimobile is an ethnological term for a practice noted among a number of indigenous peoples of the Upper Amazon, such as the Urarina. This symbiotic form of indigenous production, exchange and consumption articulates among nomadic patterns of residence, agricultural practices and extractive pursuits animated by the modernist desires of the global economy.
