= Brasilia Presidential Act =

International treaty

Spanish: Acta Presidencial de Brasilia Portuguese: Ato Presidencial de Brasília
- Ecuador–Peru border
- Signed: 26 October 1998
- Location: Brasília
- Signatories: Ecuador; Peru; Argentina; Brazil; Chile; United States
- Language: Spanish

Full text
- es:Acta de Brasilia at Wikisource

The Brasilia Presidential Act (Spanish: Acta Presidencial de Brasilia, Portuguese: Ato Presidencial de Brasília), also known as the Fujimori–Mahuad Treaty (Spanish: Tratado Fujimori–Mahuad), is an international treaty signed in Brasília by the then President of Ecuador, Jamil Mahuad and then President of Peru, Alberto Fujimori, which effectively put an end to the Ecuadorian–Peruvian territorial dispute.

== Background ==
After the 1941 Ecuadorian–Peruvian War, both countries, with the mediation of the United States, Argentina, Chile and Brazil, signed in Rio de Janeiro the Rio Protocol, that settled the boundary line between Peru and Ecuador. During the process of placing the respective milestones, the countries disagreed due to a geographical error in the Cordillera del Cóndor. They decided to go to the arbitration of the Brazilian Braz Dias de Aguiar, with which the works continued. However, due to the limited knowledge of the region, ambiguous terms such as "divortium aquarum" or "nascent river X" were used, discrepancies reappeared and in 1948, when only 78 kilometers were missing by demarcation, Ecuador suspended the placement of the landmarks and declared the Protocol unenforceable and void in 1960. With the dispute still unsolved, both countries went to war again in the 1981 Paquisha War, with the Cenepa War occurring in 1995.

== Treaty ==
After the end of the conflict, negotiations began between representatives Fernando de Trazegnies for Peru and Édgar Terán for Ecuador. After a year and a half of intense talks, and after a pronouncement of international experts on the border line, the two countries, with the approval of their respective Congresses, agree to submit their differences to the decision of the guarantors of the 1942 Rio Protocol. They ratified the validity of the mentioned document, the arbitration award of Dias de Aguiar and other complementary documents.

The treaty was signed at Itamaraty Palace on October 26, 1998, with the signatories being as follows:

Signatories
Alberto Fujimori	President of Peru
Fernando de Trazegnies	Minister of Foreign Affairs of Peru
Jamil Mahuad	President of Ecuador
José Ayala Lasso	Minister of Foreign Affairs of Ecuador
Carlos Menem	President of Argentina
Fernando Henrique Cardoso	President of Brazil
Eduardo Frei Ruiz-Tagle	President of Chile
Thomas F. McLarty III	Representative of the President of the United States

The peace agreement was followed by the formal demarcation of the border on 13 May 1999 and the end of the multi-national Military Observer Mission for Ecuador and Peru (MOMEP) troop deployment on 17 June 1999. The mission was composed of military representatives of the mediator countries that also signed the treaty, and had been operating since April 13, 1995, with its headquarters in Patuca, Ecuador.

=== Territorial changes ===
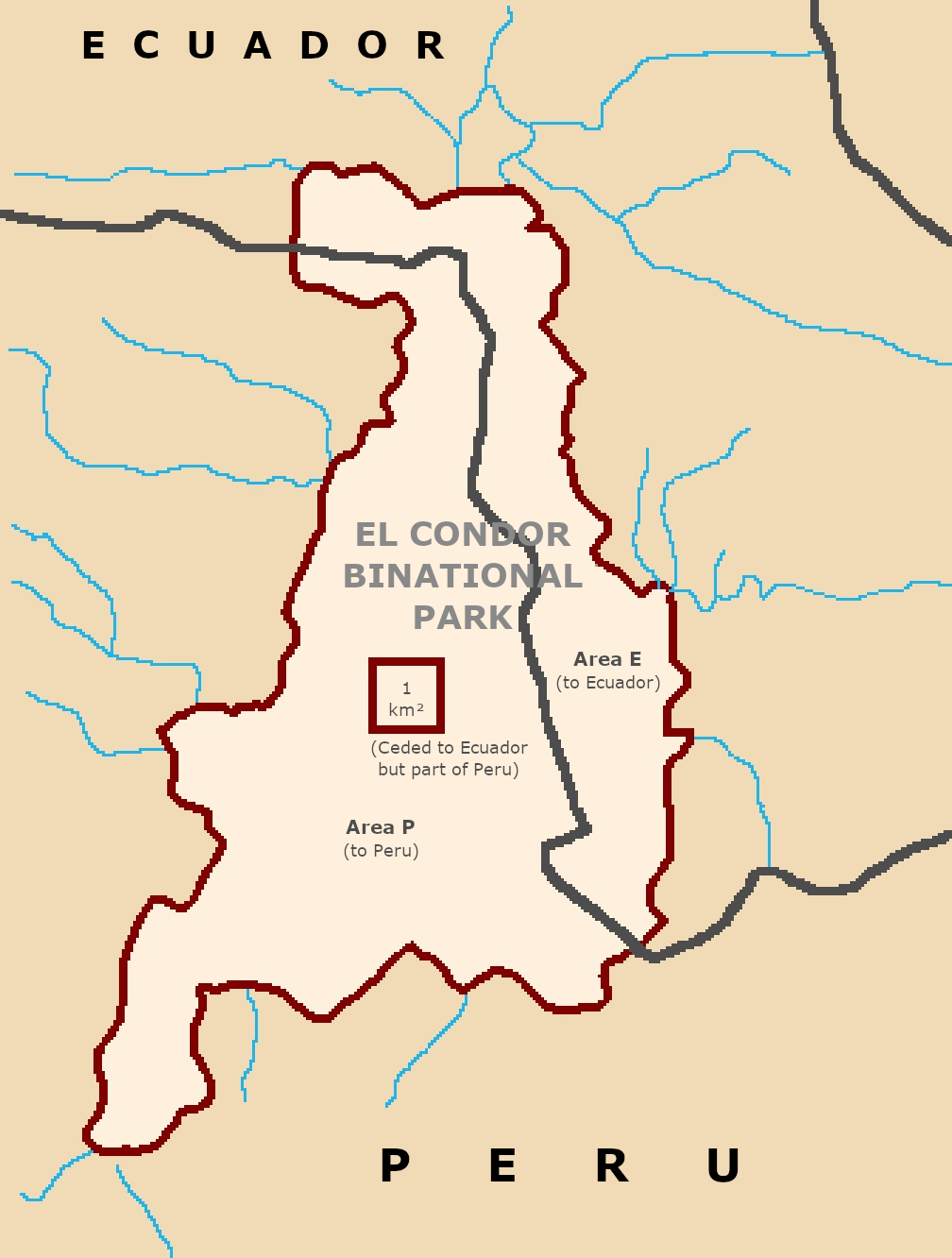
Post-1998 map of Tiwinza.

==== Tiwinza ====
The document recognized Peruvian sovereignty in Tiwinza, leasing Ecuador 1 km^{2} within the area as private property. Anyone born in the territory would be recognized as a Peruvian citizen, but the area would nevertheless remain under lease to Ecuador. As per the treaty, the area would exclusively serve a ceremonial purpose, so that both countries could commemorate the conflict. One part of this plan was to establish a Peace Park (Spanish: Parque de la Paz), which would include a monument dedicated to the fallen during the conflict, and a road system to connect the area with the rest of the country. This purpose, however, has been interrupted by the slow process of demining the area, which remains covered in mines and other boobytraps. The process is expected to finish in 2024.

In 1999, the El Cóndor Biological Reserve was established. The park is divided in two areas, one belonging to Ecuador and the other to Peru.

==== Pijuayal and Saramiriza ====
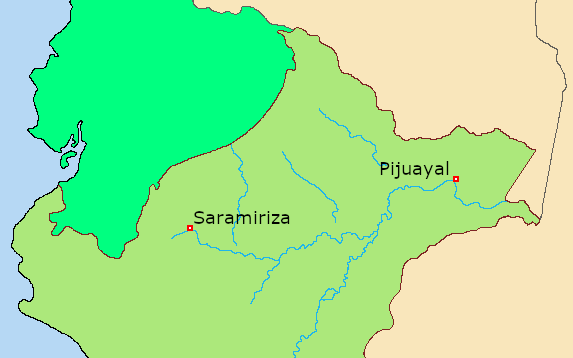
Map highlighting Pijuayal and Saramiriza

As per the treaty, Ecuador would also be granted two 150 ha territories in the Peruvian towns of Pijuayal and Saramiriza for 50 years, where Trade and Navigation Centers (Spanish: Centros de Comercio y Navegación, CECONA) would be established in order to provide the country an outlet to the Amazon River. Protests from local tribes have slowed down the process, however.

One notable protest took place on October 24, 1998, two days before the signing of the treaty. The event started as a peaceful protest organized by the Committee of Peace and Development, and attended by the Loreto Patriotic Front (Spanish: Frente Patriótico de Loreto) in the 28 July Plaza, eventually spiraling into riots between members of the group and local police and military units headed by José Villanueva Ruesta, that left 5 people dead and several vehicles and buildings burnt by protesters. The event is annually commemorated by members of the group, where it is known as the Day of Dignity (Spanish: Día de la Dignidad). The event is of a political nature, being characterized by anti-Fujimorism.

In 2018, after several years of postponing the project, an Ecuadorian inter-institutional team traveled to Pijuayal to establish the boundaries of the land where the first CECONA would work, according to authorities from the Foreign Ministry, Ministry of Defense and Military Geographic Institute of Ecuador, prior to the Cabinet Binational and Presidential Meeting between Lenín Moreno and Martín Vizcarra held in Quito on October 25 and 26 of that year, where in addition to highlighting the delimitation of boundaries, other border integration projects were reviewed, such as the final demining of the old undelimited areas, and the Puyango-Tumbes binational irrigation project.

== Aftermath ==
In May 1999, the last milestone out of 30 was placed, which finally ended a conflict of more than a century and a half, which brought together the integration between the two countries through the 0°0' parallel in the Loreto region, that from there goes down to the Zarumilla River through Tiwinza to the north of Peru.

== See also ==
- Salomón–Lozano Treaty, which ended the Colombian–Peruvian territorial dispute
- Treaty of Lima, which ended the Chilean–Peruvian territorial dispute
- Polo-Bustamante Treaty, which ended the Bolivian–Peruvian territorial dispute
