= Purús Communal Reserve =

Protected area in Peru

- Reserva Comunal Purús
- IUCN category VI (protected area with sustainable use of natural resources)
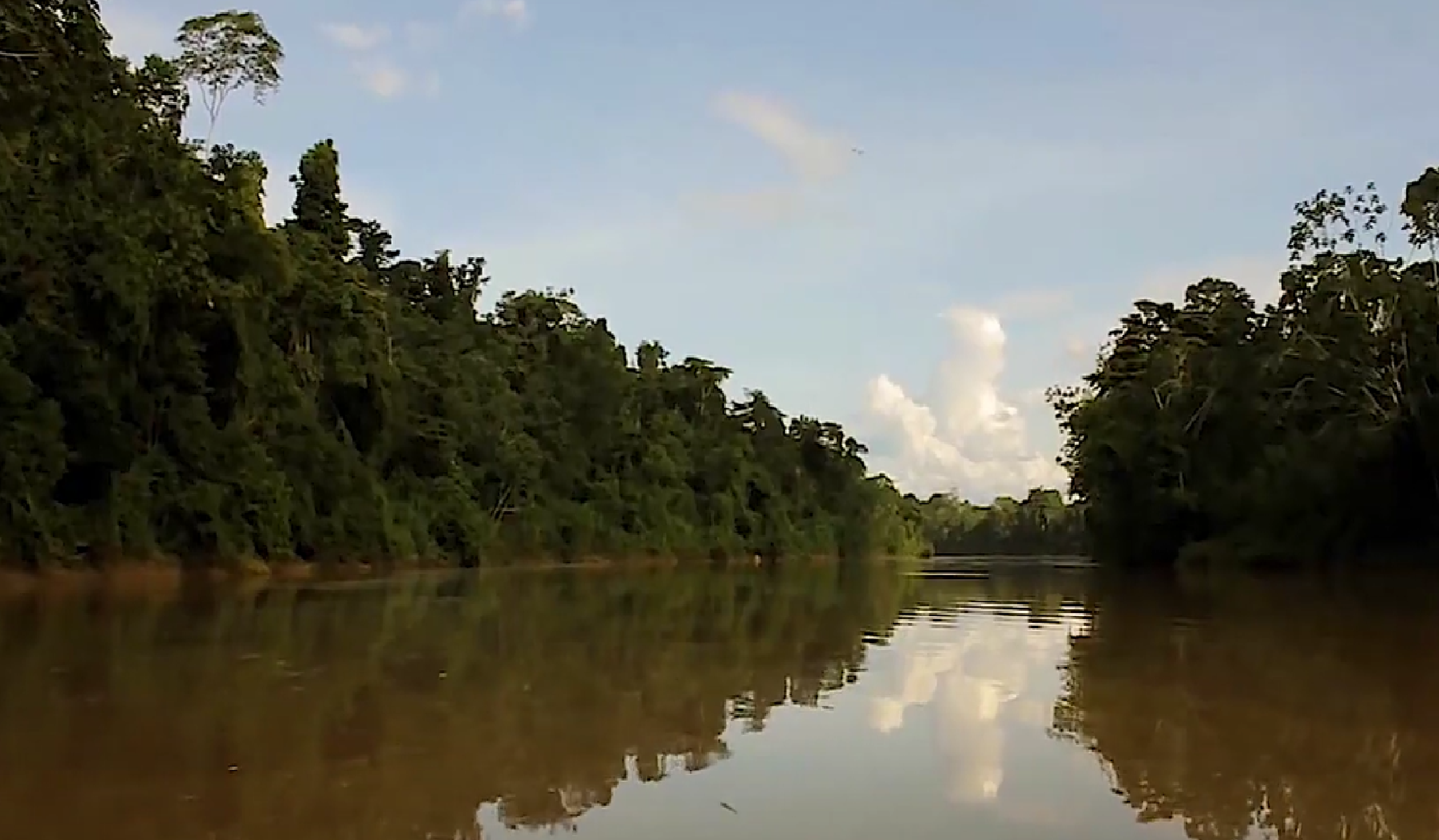

- Location within Peru
- Location: Peru; Regions of Madre de Dios and Ucayali
- Coordinates: 10°11′01″S 71°04′17″W
- Area: 202,033.21 ha (780.0546 sq mi)
- Established: November 18, 2004
- Governing body: SERNANP
- Website: Reserva Comunal El Sira (in Spanish)

The Purús Communal Reserve (Reserva Communal Purús) is a protected area in the Amazonian part of Peru. Located in the Madre de Dios Region and in the Ucayali Region, it is a buffer zone between national parks and other areas.
