= Barranca District, Datem del Marañón =

Coordinates: 4.8133°S 76.5865°W

Barranca District
- District
- Interactive map of Barranca District
- Country: Peru
- Region: Loreto
- Province: Datem del Marañón
- Founded: October 26, 1886
- Capital: San Lorenzo

Area
  - Total: 6,888.18 km^{2} (2,659.54 sq mi)
- Elevation: 128 m (420 ft)

Population (2005 census)
  - Total: 12,085
  - Density: 1.7545/km^{2} (4.5440/sq mi)
- Time zone: UTC-5 (PET)
- UBIGEO: 160203

Barranca District is one of six districts of the province Datem del Marañón in Peru.

== Climate ==
Climate data for San Lorenzo, Barranca, elevation 134 m (440 ft), (1991–2020)
Month	Jan	Feb	Mar	Apr	May	Jun	Jul	Aug	Sep	Oct	Nov	Dec	Year
Mean daily maximum °C (°F)	31.7 (89.1)	31.5 (88.7)	31.7 (89.1)	31.7 (89.1)	31.6 (88.9)	31.0 (87.8)	31.2 (88.2)	32.2 (90.0)	32.4 (90.3)	32.4 (90.3)	32.2 (90.0)	31.7 (89.1)	31.8 (89.2)
Mean daily minimum °C (°F)	22.2 (72.0)	22.3 (72.1)	22.3 (72.1)	22.2 (72.0)	22.1 (71.8)	21.8 (71.2)	21.5 (70.7)	21.4 (70.5)	21.7 (71.1)	21.9 (71.4)	22.1 (71.8)	22.1 (71.8)	22.0 (71.5)
Average precipitation mm (inches)	221.8 (8.73)	207.7 (8.18)	259.9 (10.23)	252.5 (9.94)	197.2 (7.76)	166.8 (6.57)	126.6 (4.98)	117.4 (4.62)	150.6 (5.93)	168.7 (6.64)	237.4 (9.35)	250.1 (9.85)	2,356.7 (92.78)
Source: National Meteorology and Hydrology Service of Peru
