= Regional Government of Ucayali =

Regional government in Peru

- Gobierno Regional de Ucayali

Regional Government overview
- Formed: January 1, 2003; 22 years ago
- Jurisdiction: Department of Ucayali
- Website: Government site

The Regional Government of Ucayali (Spanish: Gobierno Regional de Ucayali; GORE Ucayali) is the regional government that represents the Department of Ucayali. It is the body with legal identity in public law and its own assets, which is in charge of the administration of provinces of the department in Peru. Its purpose is the social, cultural and economic development of its constituency.

It is based in the city of Pucallpa.

== List of representatives ==
Governor	Political party	Period
Edwin Vásquez López	Movimiento Independiente Nueva Amazonía	January 1, 2003–December 31, 2006
Jorge Velásquez Portocarrero	Integrando Ucayali	January 1, 2007–December 31, 2010
Jorge Velásquez Portocarrero	Integrando Ucayali	January 1, 2011–December 31, 2014
Manuel Gambini Rupay	Movimiento Independiente Regional Cambio Ucayalino	January 1, 2015–December 31, 2018
Francisco Pezo Torres	Alianza para el Progreso	January 1, 2019–December 24, 2021
Ángel Gutiérrez Rodríguez	Alianza para el Progreso	December 24, 2021–December 24, 2022
Manuel Gambini Rupay	Movimiento Independiente Regional Cambio Ucayalino	January 1, 2023–Incumbent

== See also ==
- Regional Governments of Peru
- Department of Ucayali
