= Andoas District =

Coordinates: 3.4751°S 76.4346°W

- District
- Interactive map of Andoas District
- Country: Peru
- Region: Loreto
- Province: Datem del Marañón
- Founded: August 1, 2005
- Capital: Alianza Cristiana

Area
  - Total: 11,549.8 km^{2} (4,459.4 sq mi)
- Elevation: 210 m (690 ft)

Population (2005 census)
  - Total: 9,448
  - Density: 0.8180/km^{2} (2.119/sq mi)
- Time zone: UTC-5 (PET)
- UBIGEO: 160706

Andoas District is one of six districts of the province Datem del Marañón in Peru.
