= Morona District =

Coordinates: 4.3248°S 77.2165°W

- District
- Interactive map of Morona District
- Country: Peru
- Region: Loreto
- Province: Datem del Marañón
- Founded: July 2, 1943
- Capital: Puerto Alegría

Area
  - Total: 10,777 km^{2} (4,161 sq mi)
- Elevation: 130 m (430 ft)

Population (2005 census)
  - Total: 6,658
  - Density: 0.6178/km^{2} (1.600/sq mi)
- Time zone: UTC-5 (PET)
- UBIGEO: 160208

Morona District is one of six districts of the province Datem del Marañón in Peru.
