= Manseriche District =

Coordinates: 4.4328°S 78.1105°W

- District
- Interactive map of Manseriche District
- Country: Peru
- Region: Loreto
- Province: Datem del Marañón
- Founded: July 2, 1943
- Capital: Saramiriza

Area
  - Total: 3,493.77 km^{2} (1,348.95 sq mi)
- Elevation: 120 m (390 ft)

Population (2005 census)
  - Total: 7,773
  - Density: 2.225/km^{2} (5.762/sq mi)
- Time zone: UTC-5 (PET)
- UBIGEO: 160207

Manseriche District is one of six districts of the province Datem del Marañón in Peru.
