= Raimondi District =

Raimondi District Distrito de Raimondi
- District
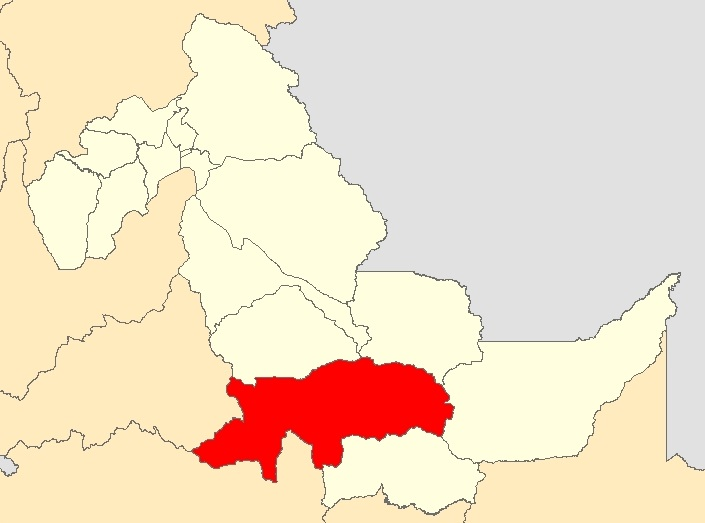
- Location of Raymondi in the Atalaya province
- Coordinates: 10.7331°S 73.7506°W
- Country: Peru
- Region: Ucayali
- Province: Atalaya
- Founded: July 2, 1943
- Capital: Atalaya

Government
  - Mayor: Francisco de Asís Mendoza De Souza

Area
  - Total: 14,508.51 km^{2} (5,601.77 sq mi)
- Elevation: 240 m (790 ft)

Population (2005 census)
  - Total: 24,982
  - Density: 1.7219/km^{2} (4.4597/sq mi)
- Time zone: UTC-5 (PET)
- Website: muniatalaya.gob.pe

Raimondi is a district in the middle Atalaya Province in Peru. Part of the Gran Pajonal, an elevated plateau occupied primarily by the Asháninka people. is in Raimondi district.
