= Chambira River =

River in Peru

The Chambira River is a major tributary of the Marañón River, and has been the traditional territory of the Urarina peoples for at least the past 350 years. Located in the Amazon jungle of Peru, otherwise known as the Selva, the Chambira is a tropical waterway with many purposes. There is a huge diversity of plants and animals in this region, which creates a unique ecosystem around the river. Made up of "palm-swamps", the region takes its name from the Chambira palm.

Until relatively recently, the Chambira Basin was not a major focus of mapping, either by the Spanish Empire or the Peruvian nation. No major geographical surveys of the Chambira Basin were mounted during the 19th century heyday of exploration, and as a result it remained largely uncharted until the discovery of hydrocarbons in the region in the 1970s. With the subsequent mobilization of indigenous peoples and government-backed neo-liberal legislation, the lands of the Chambira Basin have now been fully mapped.

== Ecosystem ==
The name "Chambira" refers to the dense growth of Chambira palms that cover the region. Otherwise known as Astrocaryum chambira, this native plant has many uses. The plant produces edible fruit consumed by humans and animals alike, and the leaves can be used as fiber for tying rope. Medicinal value is also a benefit of the Chambira palm. The Selva is a tropical climate so it is home to a variety of plants and other life forms. Tropical fruits such as bananas grow there. In the river itself is a plethora of different freshwater species, not limited to but including turtles, fish, caimans, stingrays, and electric eels. All of these species make up an aquatic food chain that indirectly feeds the land as well. Land animals eat the aquatic fish which is returned to the earth in the form of fertilizer. This feeds plant which is the starting block of the land food chain. It is in this manner that the Chambira River plays a role in the environment around it.

== Human interaction ==
The Urarina, or an indigenous population living along the Chambira River, receive many benefits from the water system. Because they have access to a fresh water source, these people have developed different farming methods which make use of the river. The first of these is slash and burn farming, which involves exploiting a farm plot for three to five years before moving on to a new area. The other kind of farming implemented is an open plot along the riverbank. During the dry season, the river recedes, leaving behind highly arable silt that is usually monocropped for a short season. The river also provides a crucial system of interconnected waterways to the Urarina. The men from the tribe make dugout canoes which provide the primary mode of transportation for the Urarina. The river can be used to transport agricultural and other goods downstream to a market or to another tribe. Within the Chambira Basin, all of the rivers are connected in some way with tributaries, thus creating a water highway in the Peruvian jungle. Not only do primitive populations make use of the river system, but large-scale corporations transport goods along the rivers. The most notable example of this is the flotation of oil down the river from the many oil fields in the Selva. The Chambira River not only supports a complex ecosystem, but also aids humans in their endeavors along the waterway.

== Effects of pollution ==
The Chambira River is a life source for many things near its waters, but pollution in the river is starting to raise questions whether this will be a viable water source in the future. Dating back to the 1970s, Occidental Petroleum, and later Pluspetrol started extracting oil out of the Peruvian rainforest and transporting it back to the coast using the river system. In addition to 18 other previous spills, the most recent spill on January 16, 2011, was of over 400 barrels of crude oil. Although there are methods of cleaning oil out of a water system, the buildup of heavy metals and other toxins in the Chambira are of concern given the vast number of spills. The most recent spill occurred near a humedal, or a part of the wetland rainforest that remains partially flooded, which poses risks for the fish-spawning grounds located there. Hunting and fishing are far more crucial than farming to the indigenous population's survival. The food source provided by the river maintains the Urarina's lifestyle. With so much depending on the stable balance of the Chambira River's ecosystem, manmade disasters such as oil spills are of concern for Pluspetrol, the indigenous populations, as well as the Peruvian government.
