= Urarina people =

Peruvian indigenous people

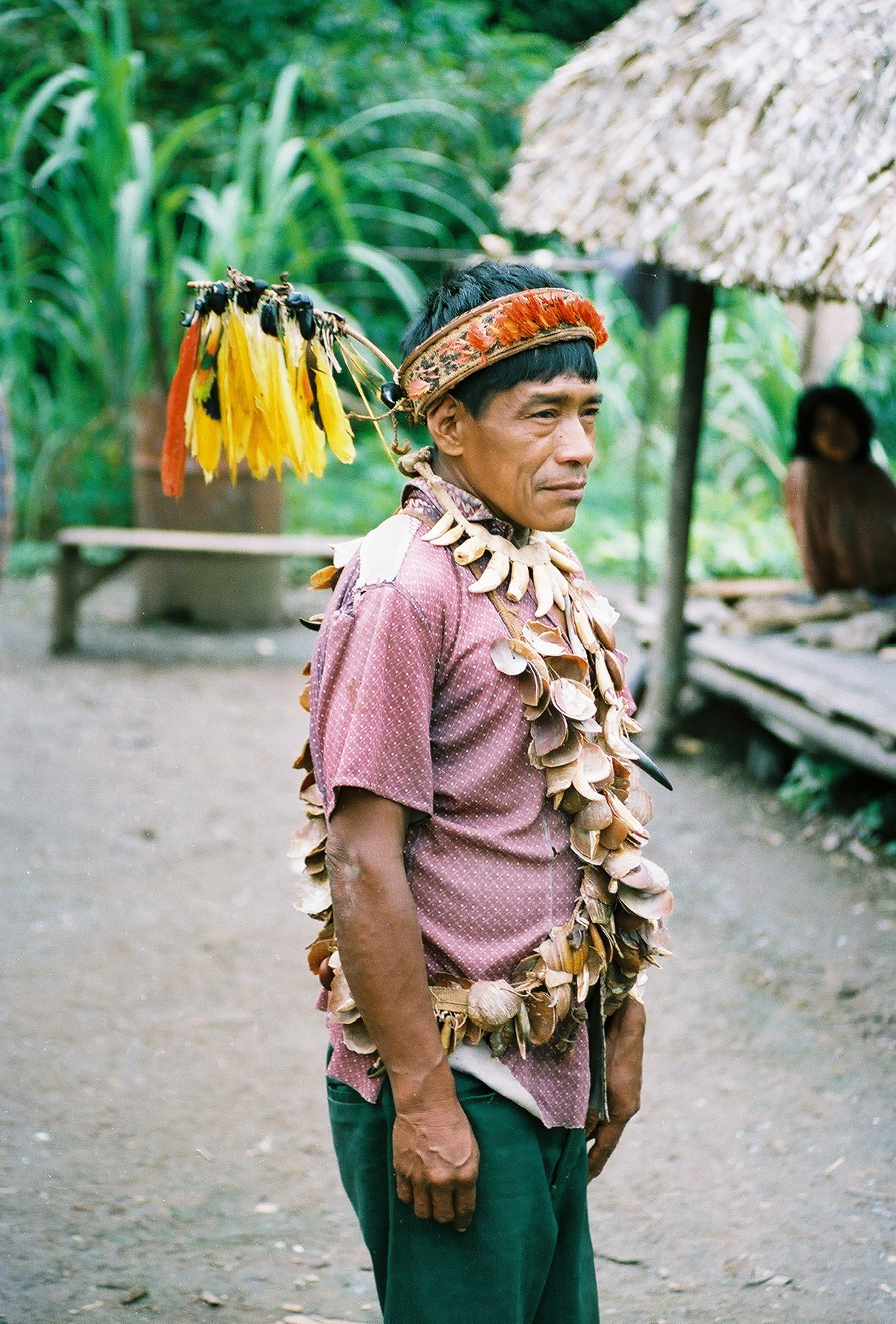
Urarina shaman, 1988

The Urarina are an indigenous people of the Peruvian Amazon Basin (Loreto) who inhabit the valleys of the Chambira, Urituyacu, and Corrientes Rivers. According to both archaeological and historical sources, they have resided in the Chambira Basin of contemporary northeastern Peru for centuries. The Urarina refer to themselves as Kachá (lit. "person"), while ethnologists know them by the ethnonym Urarina.

The local vernacular term for the Urarina is Shimaku, which is considered by the Urarina to be pejorative, as it is a Quechua term meaning "unreliable". The ethnonym "Urarina" is derived from the word urari 'Xanthosoma sagittifolium' in the language.

== Society and culture ==
Urarina society and culture have been given little attention in the burgeoning ethnographic literature of the region, and only sporadic references in the encyclopedic genre of Peruvian Amazonia. Accounts of the Urarina peoples are limited to the data reported by Castillo, by the German ethnologist G. Tessmann in his Die Indianer Nordost-Peru, and to the observations of missionaries and contemporary adventure seekers.

The Urarina are a semi-mobile hunting and horticultural society whose population is estimated to be around 2,000. Urarina settlements are composed of multiple longhouse groups, located on high ground (restingas) or embankments along the flood-free margins of the Chambira Basin's many rivers and streams. The embankments are bounded by low-lying territories (tahuampa and bajiales) that are susceptible to flooding during the annual rainy season (roughly November–May).

Urarina local politics are characterized by a mercurial balance of power between demes united through affinal ties and episodic political alliances, exchange relations, and disputation. Surrounded by the Jivaroan, and the Tupi–Guarani-speaking Cocama-Cocamilla indigenous peoples of the upper Amazon, the Urarina have an elaborate animistic cosmological system. It is based on ayahuasca shamanism, which is based in part on the profoundly ritualized consumption of Brugmansia suaveolens.

The Urarina customarily practice brideservice, uxorilocal patterns of post-nuptial residence, debt peonage and sororal polygyny. While men are esteemed for their hunting prowess and shamanic skills, Urarina women are likewise recognized for their craftsmanship: the women are consummate producers of woven palm-fiber bast mats, hammocks, and net-bags.

== Language ==
Documentation of the Urarina language, which has been classified as a language isolate or unclassified language by Terrence Kaufman (1990) is underway as of 2006. Linguistic work among the Urarina was first pioneered by SIL International.

== Mythology ==
The Urarina have a deluge-myth, in which a man saved himself from the deluge while climbing a cudí (amasiza, Erythrina elei) tree; the man's wife was transformed into a termites' nest clinging to that tree, while their two sons became birds. Afterwards that man acquired a wife, a different woman, one who had at first summoned successively a pit viper, a spider, and a giant biting ant in an unsuccessful attempt to evade him. In another Urarina deluge-myth, a deluge was produced, on the occasion of a cassava-beer festival, by the urination by the daughter of the ayahuasca-god, "giving rise to the chthonic world of spirits".

The Urarina continue to tell elaborate myths and stories about the violence that they experience from outsiders, which historically has included forced-labor conscription, rape, disease, concubinage, and abusive treatment at the hands of outsiders. Portions of the Bible were first published in Urarina in 1973; however, the complete Bible is not published.

== Survival ==
Despite challenges to their ongoing cultural survival, including ecocide, inadequate health-care, and cultural appropriation, the Urarina have both been inspired by and resisted the violence of the colonial and postcolonial encounters in Amazonia, particularly during the Alberto Fujimori regime.

== Indigenous rights ==
Contemporary indigenous resistance has involved intercultural education projects, as well as Urarina political mobilization.

== See also ==
- Universal Declaration of Human Rights, (incomplete) Urarina version from the Coordinadora Nacional de Derechos Humanos
