= Breu =

Breu is a surname. Notable people with the surname include:

- Beat Breu (born 1957), Swiss former road bicycle racer
- Josef Breu (1914–1998), Austrian geographer and cartographer
- Jörg Breu, multiple people
  Jörg Breu the Elder (c. 1475–1537), painter of the German Danube school
  Jörg Breu the Younger (1510–1547), son of Jörg Breu the Elder, was a painter of Augsburg
- Lurdes Breu (born 1940), Portuguese municipal mayor
- Reinhold Breu (born 1970), German football manager and former player
