= Esperanza, Ucayali =

Esperanza
- Town
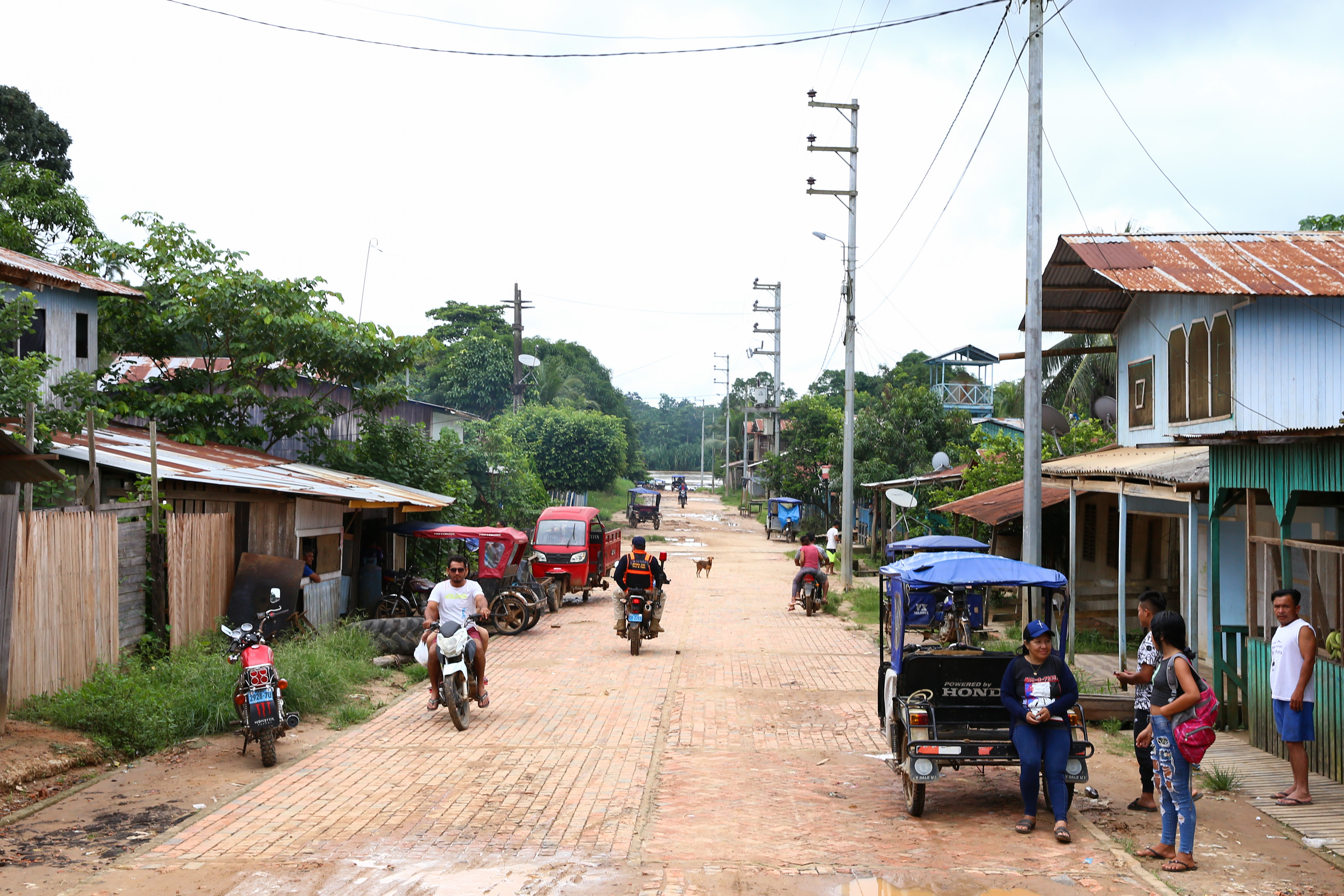

- Location within Peru
- Coordinates: 9°47′55″S 70°45′12″W
- Country: Peru
- Region: Ucayali
- Province: Purus
- District: Purús
- Time zone: UTC-5 (PET)

Esperanza also known as Puerto Esperanza is a town in Peru, capital of Purús Province in Ucayali Region.

Esperanza is served by Puerto Esperanza Airport. According to the 2007 census, it had a population of 1,251 people.
