= Puerto Esperanza Airport =

Airport in Peru

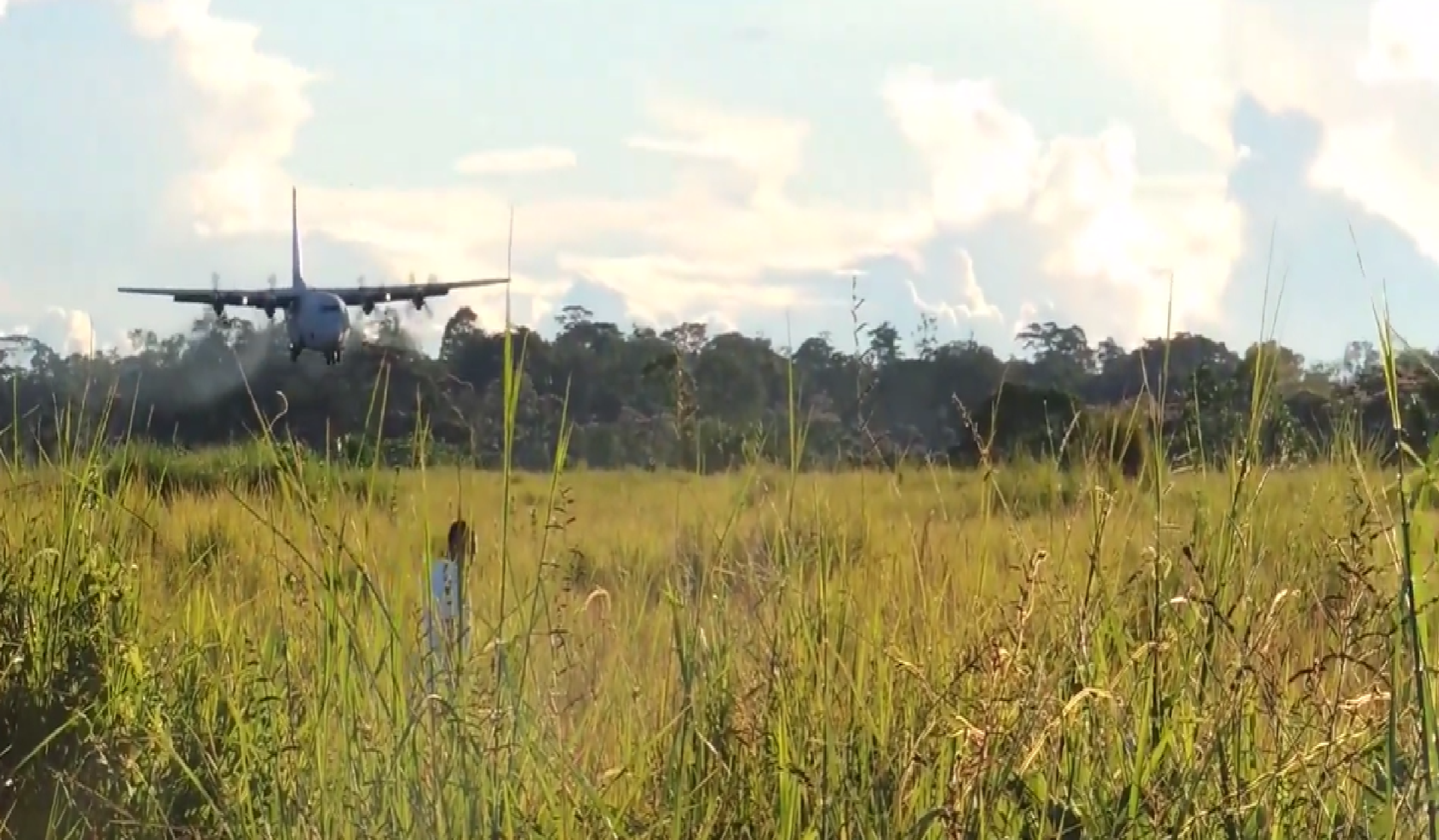
- IATA: none; ICAO: SPEP

Summary
- Airport type: Public
- Serves: Esperanza
- Elevation AMSL: 725 ft / 221 m
- Coordinates: 9°46′05″S 70°42′25″W

Map
- Location of the airport in Peru

Runways
Direction	Length		Surface
Direction	m	ft	Surface
07/25	1,800	5,906	Asphalt
- Source: GCM Google Maps

Puerto Esperanza Airport (ICAO: SPEP) is an airport serving the town of Esperanza in the Ucayali Region of Peru. The town is on the Purus River.

The airport provides a vital air link to the nearby community, serving as the only route for airlifted donations, medicines, and other critical supplies in the remote town, while also offering air connectivity through Peruvian Air Force civic flights and medevac for locals. However, in 2024, local leaders complained that the runway is in disrepair and that they have repeatedly appealed to national authorities, CORPAC and the Ministry of Transport and Communications to repair it, without success.

The Puerto Esperanza VOR (Ident: PZA) is located on the field.

== Accident ==
- On 22 December 1979, a Peruvian Air Force DHC-5D (reg. FAP-348, msn. 55) on a civic flight from Pucallpa Airport crashed on approach to Puerto Esperanza, killing all 29 occupants. While descending to Puerto Esperanza, the crew encountered thunderstorm activity, which possibly led to severe in-flight turbulences. The airplane lost control and crashed about 30 km from the airport.

== See also ==
- Transport in Peru
- List of airports in Peru
