= Universidad Continental =

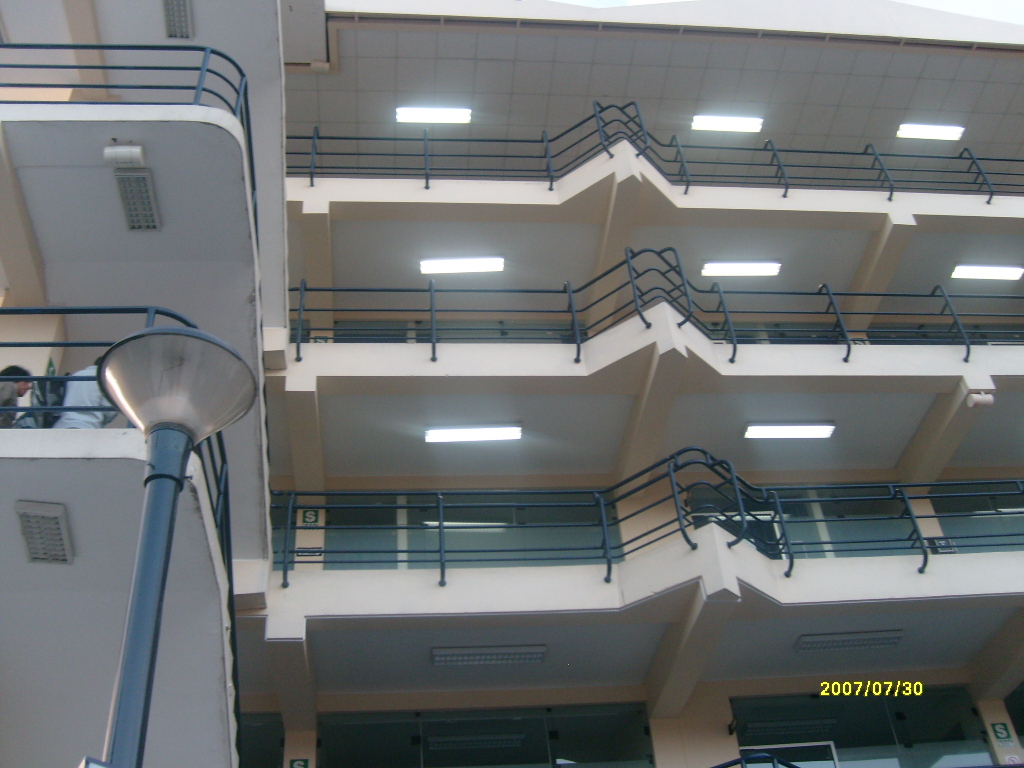
- UC campus
- Type: Private university
- Established: June 30, 1998
- Location: Av. San Carlos Nº 1980, Huancayo, Junín, Peru; 12.047426°S 75.198653°W
- Language: Spanish
- Website: ucontinental.edu.pe

The Universidad Continental -- formerly the Universidad Continental de Ciencias e Ingeniería (UCCI) -- is a private university in Huancayo, Junín, Peru. The university has branches in Lima, Arequipa, Ayacucho, Ica and Cusco.

== History ==
The Universidad Continental opened in the city of Huancayo under Resolution No. 429-98-CONAFU, of 30 June 1998. After about four years of operation, the National Council for the Operating License of Universities (CONAFU) issued resolution No. 176-2002-CONAFU approving the university's adaptation to the Law of Promotion of Investment in Education, DL882.

In 2016 the university launched a US$50 million program to build new campuses and laboratories, and to present its new brand. In 2017, the university received ISO 9001:2015 Certification "for the satisfactory management system of its workshops and laboratories used for teaching and learning, both in its undergraduate and postgraduate academic programs". In August 2018 the National Superintendence of University Higher Education (SUNEDU) awarded an institutional license to the UC for six years after verifying that 40 programs met the Basic Quality Conditions (CBC) of the University Law. To obtain the license the university developed a strategic plan and a quality assurance system, and set up a Planning and Quality office.

== Courses ==
As of 2018 there were 28 undergraduate programs and 12 graduate programs. The university had over 24,500 students in seven location in Huancayo (Junín), Arequipa, Cusco and Lima. There were 839 professors, of whom 38 were researchers and 26% were full-time teachers.

The university offers courses in:

- Administration
- Architecture
- Accounting and Finance
- Science and Communication Technologies
- Law
- Economics
- Agribusiness
- Engineering
- Environmental Engineering
- Civil Engineering
- Industrial Engineering
- Systems and Information Technology
- Psychology

== Ranking ==
As of July 2019 the total ResearchGate score was 427.29 from 631 members. Researchgate showed the top collaborating institutions as Cayetano Heredia University and Universidad Ricardo Palma. This metric has been criticized for being opaque and sometimes misleading.

== Sources ==
- Fernando Barrios Ipenza (25 August 2017), Esta es la universidad peruana que ha recibido la certificación ISO 9001 (in Spanish)
- Kraker, Peter; Jordan, Katy; Lex, Elisabeth (11 December 2015), ResearchGate Score: Good Example of a Bad Metric
- Redacción Gestión (15 August 2016), "Universidad Continental invierte US$ 50 millones en expansión en cuatro ciudades", Gestión (in Spanish)
- "SUNEDU otorga licencia institucional a la Universidad Continental por 6 años", Prensa (in Spanish), 11 August 2018
- "Universidad Continental de Ciencias e Ingeniería (UCCI)", altillo.com (in Spanish)
- "Universidad Continental de Ciencias e Ingeniería,...", ResearchGate
