= Jörg Breu =

Jörg Breu may refer to:

- Jörg Breu the Elder (c. 1475–1537), painter of the German Danube school
- Jörg Breu the Younger (1510–1547), son of Jörg Breu the Elder, was a painter of Augsburg
