= Datem del Marañón province =

Coordinates: 4°49′48″S 76°42′00″W

Datem del Marañón
- Province
- Interactive map of Datem del Marañón
- Country: Peru
- Region: Loreto
- Founded: August 2, 2005
- Capital: San Lorenzo

Area
  - Total: 46,609.9 km^{2} (17,996.2 sq mi)
- Elevation: 128 m (420 ft)

Population
  - Total: 49,446
  - Density: 1.0608/km^{2} (2.7476/sq mi)
- UBIGEO: 1607

Datem del Marañón is one of the eight provinces in the Loreto Region of Peru. It was created on August 2, 2005, during the presidency of Alejandro Toledo.

== Political division ==
The province is divided into six districts.

- Andoas (Alianza Cristiana)
- Barranca (San Lorenzo)
- Cahuapanas (Santa María de Cahuapanas)
- Manseriche (Saramiriza)
- Morona (Puerto Alegría)
- Pastaza (Ullpayacu)
