= Purús province =

Coordinates: 9°47′55″S 70°45′12″W

Purus
- Province
- Location of Purus in the Ucayali Region
- Country: Peru
- Region: Ucayali
- Founded: July 2, 1943
- Capital: Esperanza
- UBIGEO: 2504
- Website: www.munipurus.gob.pe

Purús is one of four provinces in the Ucayali Region, in the central Amazon rainforest of Peru. In 2022 it had a population of 3,270. The Purus River runs through it.
