= UBIGEO =

Coding system for geographical locations in Peru

UBIGEO (Spanish pronunciation: [uβiˈxeo]) is the coding system for geographical locations (Spanish: Código Ubicacíon Geográfica) in Peru used by the National Institute of Statistics and Informatics (Spanish: Instituto Nacional de Estadística e Informática, INEI) to code the first-level administrative subdivision: regions (Spanish: regiones, singular: región), the second-level administrative subdivision: provinces (Spanish: provincias, singular: provincia) and the third-level administrative subdivision: districts (Spanish: distritos, singular: distrito). There are 1874 different ubigeos in Peru.

== Syntax ==
The coding system uses two-digit numbers for each level of subdivision. The first level starts numbering at 01 for the Amazonas Region and continues in alphabetical order up to 25 for the Ucayali Region. Additional regions will be added to the end of the list, starting with the first available number.

The second level starts with 0101 for the first province in the Amazonas region: Chachapoyas Province and continues up to 2504 for the last province Purús in the Ucayali Region. The provinces are numbered per region with the first province always being the one in which the regions capital is located. The remaining provinces are coded in alphabetical order. Additional provinces will be added per region to the end of the list, starting with the first available province number.

The third level; starts with 010101 for the first district in the first province in the Amazonas region: Chachapoyas District and continues up to 250401 for the last district in the last province of the Ucayali region: Purús District. The districts are numbered per province with the first district always being the one in which the province's capital is located. The remaining districts are coded in alphabetical order. Additional districts will be added per province to the end of the list, starting with the first available district number.

== Examples ==
=== Regions ===
- 01 Amazonas Region
- 02 Ancash Region
- 03 Apurímac Region

=== Provinces ===
- 0101 Chachapoyas Province in the Amazonas region.
- 0102 Bagua Province in the Amazonas region.
- 0103 Bongará Province in the Amazonas region.
- 0104 Condorcanqui Province in the Amazonas region.
- 0105 Luya Province in the Amazonas region.
- 0106 Rodríguez de Mendoza Province in the Amazonas region.
- 0107 Utcubamba Province in the Amazonas region.
- 0201 Huaraz Province in the Ancash region.

=== Districts ===
- 010101 Chachapoyas District in the Chachapoyas province.
- 010102 Asunción District in the Chachapoyas province.
- 010103 Balsas District in the Chachapoyas province.
- 010104 Cheto District in the Chachapoyas province.
- 010105 Chiliquín District in the Chachapoyas province.

== Recent additions ==
Year	Law Nº	Creation date	Ubigeo code	Description
2010	29558	July 16, 2010	050509	New district Samugari District, La Mar Province, Ayacucho Region
2010	29541	June 14, 2010	190308	New district Constitución District, Oxapampa Province, Pasco Region
2010	29539	June 14, 2010	100112	New district Yacus District, Huánuco Province, Huánuco Region
2010	29538	June 7, 2010	090511	New district Cosme District, Churcampa Province, Huancavelica Region
2008	29218	April 26, 2008	010201	New district Bagua District, Bagua Province, Amazonas Region and alphabetically renumbering the existing districts to 010202–010206
2007	28753	June 2, 2006	250107	New district Manantay District, Coronel Portillo Province, Ucayali Region
2006	28593	August 1, 2005	1507XX	New province Datem del Marañón Province, Loreto Region
2006	28593	August 1, 2005	150706	New district Andoas District, Datem del Marañón Province, Loreto Region
2006	28593	August 1, 2005	150701	Reallocated district Barranca District, Datem del Marañón, from Alto Amazonas Province to Datem del Marañón Province, Loreto Region
2006	28593	August 1, 2005	150702	Reallocated district Cahuapanas District, from Alto Amazonas Province to Datem del Marañón Province, Loreto Region
2006	28593	August 1, 2005	150703	Reallocated district Manseriche District, from Alto Amazonas Province to Datem del Marañón Province, Loreto Region
2006	28593	August 1, 2005	150704	Reallocated district Morona District, from Alto Amazonas Province to Datem del Marañón Province, Loreto Region
2006	28593	August 1, 2005	150705	Reallocated district Pastaza District, from Alto Amazonas Province to Datem del Marañón Province, Loreto Region
2006	28509	May 13, 2005	211210	New district San Pedro de Putina Punco District, Sandia Province, Puno Region
2006	28707	April 3, 2006	240203	New district Canoas de Punta Sal District, Contralmirante Villar Province, Tumbes Region

== See also ==
- Census in Peru
