= Districts of Peru =

Third level administrative subdivision of Peru

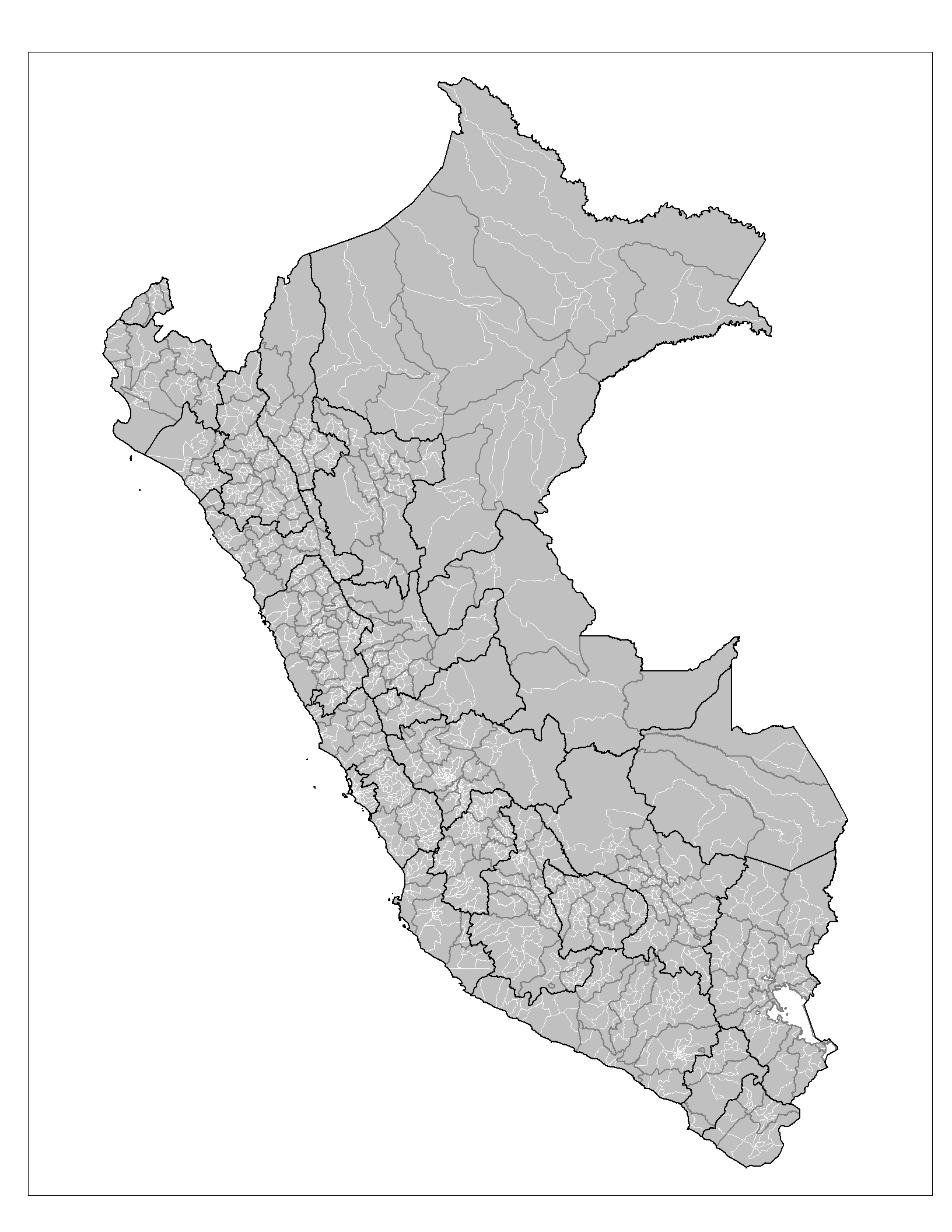
Districts of Peru

The districts of Peru (Spanish: distritos) are the third-level country subdivisions of Peru. They are subdivisions of the provinces, which in turn are subdivisions of the larger regions or departments. Districts can be divided into neighbourhoods or populated centres. There are 1,838 districts in total.

== Overview ==
A 1982 law requires a minimum of residents in an area for a new district to be legally established: 3,500 if it is located in the rainforest, 4,000 in the Andes highlands and 10,000 in the coastal area.

In the dry Andean area, many districts have less than 3,500 inhabitants due to low population density in the area. In some cases, their populations have decreased in comparison to the days when they were founded. Districts that are located at very high altitudes tend to be scarcely populated. These districts usually are large in area, have few available land for use. Many basic government services do not reach all residents of these districts due to their difficult geography. Many lack financial means to govern their whole jurisdictions and they often have high emigration rates.

A similar pattern can be observed in many districts located in the Peruvian Amazon rainforest. Once important settlements created during the era of colonization, they nowadays do not offer much space for agriculture. Deeper into the jungle, the districts of the 'selva alta' (lower jungle) have higher populations living on geographically large districts. Districts located outside the colonized area have very low populations that are entirely composed of Native Amazonian tribes.

All over the country, many districts have higher populations than the minimum required by law. This is true of the colonized areas of the rainforest, the northern Andes as well as in the southern Andes from Huancayo to the shores of Lake Titicaca, which is the historical heartland of the Peruvian highlands. These districts are old and tend to be smaller in area with high population densities since prehispanic times.

Districts in the Chala (coastal area) tend to be mid-sized except in low-density areas such as the Sechura Desert and part of the Southern coast, but all of them feature large populations due to emigration from other regions of the country that turned the Peruvian coast into the country's main economic powerhouse.

Districts with a population of more than 10,000 inhabitants should ideally be subdivided, particularly if they are also large in area, as is the case in part of the Amazon rainforest. Colonization happens quickly and boundaries of districts are often not modified, except in large urban areas. This is less of a problem in the coast where communication is easier. However, reaching to large populations remain a problem in this area.

== Top 20 district rankings ==
This is a list of the top twenty Peruvian districts by population, population density, area and elevation (of the district's capital).

=== By population ===
#	District	Province	Region	Population
1	San Juan de Lurigancho	Lima	Lima	1,038,495
2	San Martín de Porres	Lima	Lima	654,083
3	Ate	Lima	Lima	599,196
4	Comas	Lima	Lima	520,450
5	Callao	Callao	Callao	451,260
6	Villa María del Triunfo	Lima	Lima	398,433
7	Villa El Salvador	Lima	Lima	393,254
8	San Juan de Miraflores	Lima	Lima	355,219
9	Puente Piedra	Lima	Lima	329,675
10	Santiago de Surco	Lima	Lima	329,152
11	Los Olivos	Lima	Lima	325,884
12	Ventanilla	Callao	Callao	315,600
13	Trujillo	Trujillo	La Libertad	314,939
14	Chorrillos	Lima	Lima	314,241
15	Chiclayo	Chiclayo	Lambayeque	270,496
16	Lima	Lima	Lima	268,352
17	Juliaca	San Román	Puno	228,726
18	Chimbote	Santa	Ancash	206,213
19	Piura	Piura	Piura	158,495
20	Callería	Coronel Portillo	Ucayali	149,999

Source: INEI

=== By population density ===
#	District	Province	Region	Population density (/km^{2})
1	Breña	Lima	Lima	24,492
2	Surquillo	Lima	Lima	24,336
3	La Victoria	Lima	Lima	21,764
4	La Perla	Callao	Callao	21,674
5	Arequipa	Arequipa	Arequipa	21,431
6	Carmen de la Legua Reynoso	Callao	Callao	19,075
7	Florencia de Mora	Trujillo	La Libertad	18,803
8	Lince	Lima	Lima	17,202
9	Pueblo Libre	Lima	Lima	16,414
10	Bellavista	Callao	Callao	15,956
11	Los Olivos	Lima	Lima	15,701
12	Santa Anita	Lima	Lima	15,040
13	Rímac	Lima	Lima	14,810
14	San Martín de Porres	Lima	Lima	14,228
15	San Juan de Miraflores	Lima	Lima	13,980
16	Independencia	Lima	Lima	13,551
17	Magdalena del Mar	Lima	Lima	13,420
18	San Luis	Lima	Lima	13,254
19	El Agustino	Lima	Lima	13,192
20	Lima	Lima	Lima	13,187

Source: INEI

=== By area ===
#	District	Province	Region	Area (km^{2})
1	Putumayo	Maynas	Loreto	34,942.9
2	Napo	Maynas	Loreto	24,298.1
3	Tambopata	Tambopata	Madre de Dios	22,218.6
4	Tigre	Loreto	Loreto	19,785.7
5	Echarate	La Convención	Cusco	19,135.5
6	Purús	Purús	Ucayali	17,847.8
7	Urarinas	Loreto	Loreto	15,778.4
8	Iñapari	Tahuamanu	Madre de Dios	14,853.7
9	Raimondi	Atalaya	Ucayali	14,508.5
10	Alto Nanay	Maynas	Loreto	14,290.8
11	Masisea	Coronel Portillo	Ucayali	14,102.2
12	Yavarí	Mariscal Ramón Castilla	Loreto	13,807.5
13	Parinari	Loreto	Loreto	12,951.7
14	Trompeteros	Loreto	Loreto	12,246.0
15	Andoas	Datem del Marañón	Loreto	11,549.8
16	Pebas	Mariscal Ramón Castilla	Loreto	11,437.0
17	Puerto Bermúdez	Oxapampa	Pasco	10,988.1
18	Fitzcarrald	Manú	Madre de Dios	10,955.3
19	Yaquerana	Requena	Loreto	10,947.2
20	Morona	Datem del Marañón	Loreto	10,777.0

Source: INEI

=== By elevation ===
#	District	Province	Region	Elevation (m)
1	Suykutambo	Espinar	Cusco	4801
2	Condoroma	Espinar	Cusco	4737
3	San Antonio	Puno	Puno	4700
4	Ananea	San Antonio de Putina	Puno	4660
5	Morococha	Yauli	Junín	4550
6	San Antonio de Chuca	Caylloma	Arequipa	4525
7	Santa Ana	Castrovirreyna	Huancavelica	4473
8	Marcapomacocha	Yauli	Junín	4415
9	Capazo	El Collao	Puno	4400
10	Paratia	Lampa	Puno	4390
11	Cojata	Huancané	Puno	4355
12	Yanacancha	Pasco	Pasco	4350
13	Chaupimarca	Pasco	Pasco	4338
14	Macusani	Carabaya	Puno	4315
15	Huayllay	Pasco	Pasco	4310
16	Caylloma	Caylloma	Arequipa	4310
17	Vilavila	Lampa	Puno	4300
18	Tanta	Yauyos	Lima	4278
19	Tinyahuarco	Pasco	Pasco	4275
20	Suitucancha	Yauli	Junín	4255

Source: INEI

== See also ==
- Regions of Peru
- Provinces of Peru
- Administrative divisions of Peru
