= Department of Ucayali =

Department of Peru

Ucayali
- Department
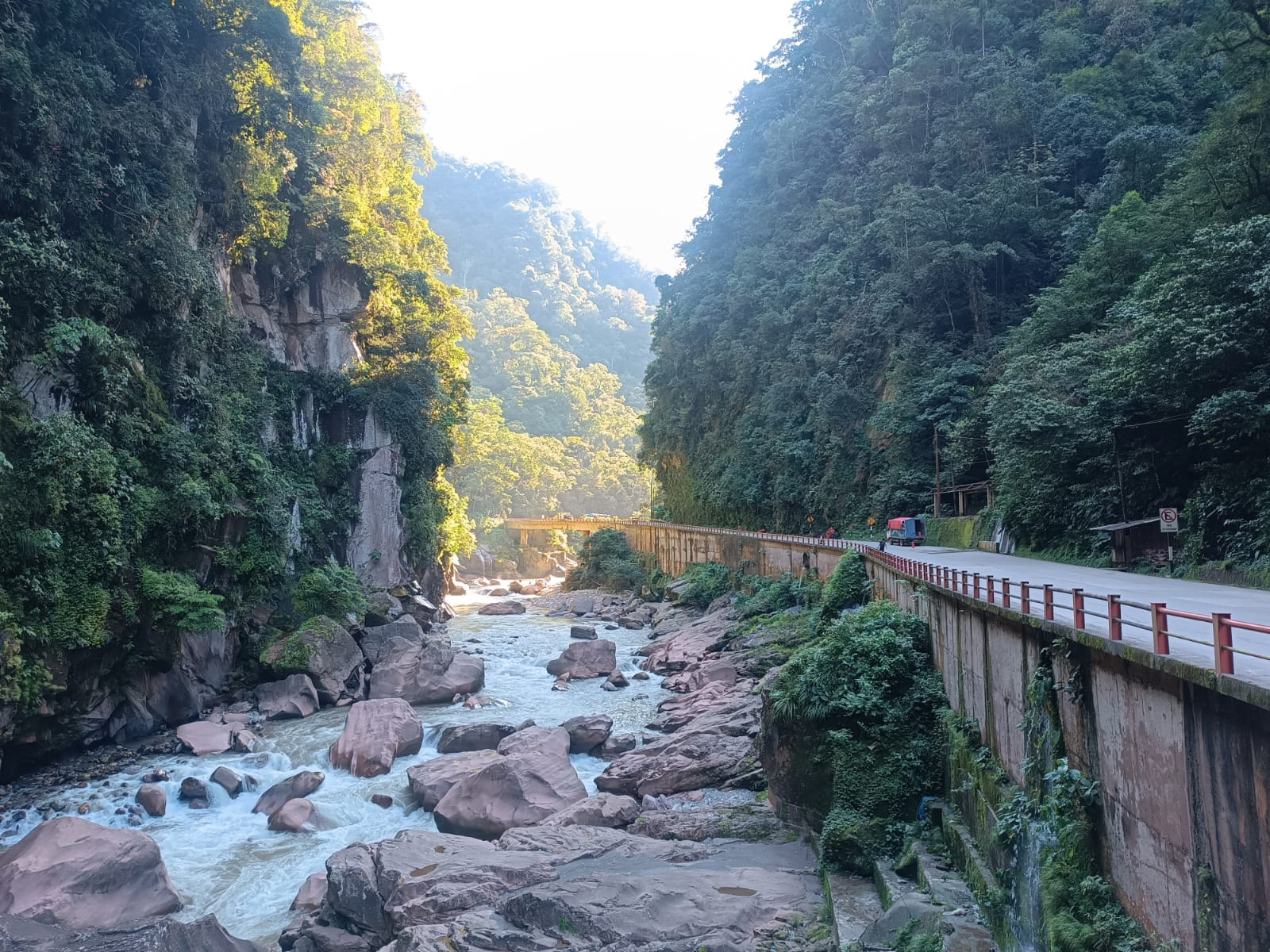
- Padre Abad forest

- Flag Coat of arms

- Location of Ucayali within Peru
- Interactive map of Ucayali
- Coordinates: 9.96°S 73.19°W
- Country: Peru
- Established: June 18, 1890
- Capital: Pucallpa
- Provinces: List: Atalaya; Coronel Portillo; Padre Abad; Purús

Government
  - Type: Regional Government
  - Governor: Francisco Pezo Torres

Area
  - Total: 101,830.64 km^{2} (39,317.03 sq mi)
- Elevation (Capital): 120 m (390 ft)
- Highest elevation: 350 m (1,150 ft)
- Lowest elevation: 135 m (443 ft)

Population (2025)
  - Total: 624,235
  - Density: 6.13013/km^{2} (15.8770/sq mi)
- Demonym: ucayalino/a
- UBIGEO: 25
- Dialing code: 061
- ISO 3166 code: PE-UCA
- Principal resources: Wood, fruit.
- Poverty rate: 33.5%
- Percentage of Peru's GDP: 0.85%
- Website: www.regionucayali.gob.pe

Ucayali (Spanish pronunciation: [ukaˈʝali]) is a department of Peru. Located in the Amazon rainforest, it is the second largest department in Peru, after Loreto. It is administered by a regional government. Its capital is the city of Pucallpa.

The arapaima is depicted on both the flag and the seal of the region.

According to the adjusted 2025 census results, 624,000 people lived in Ucayali.

== Etymology ==
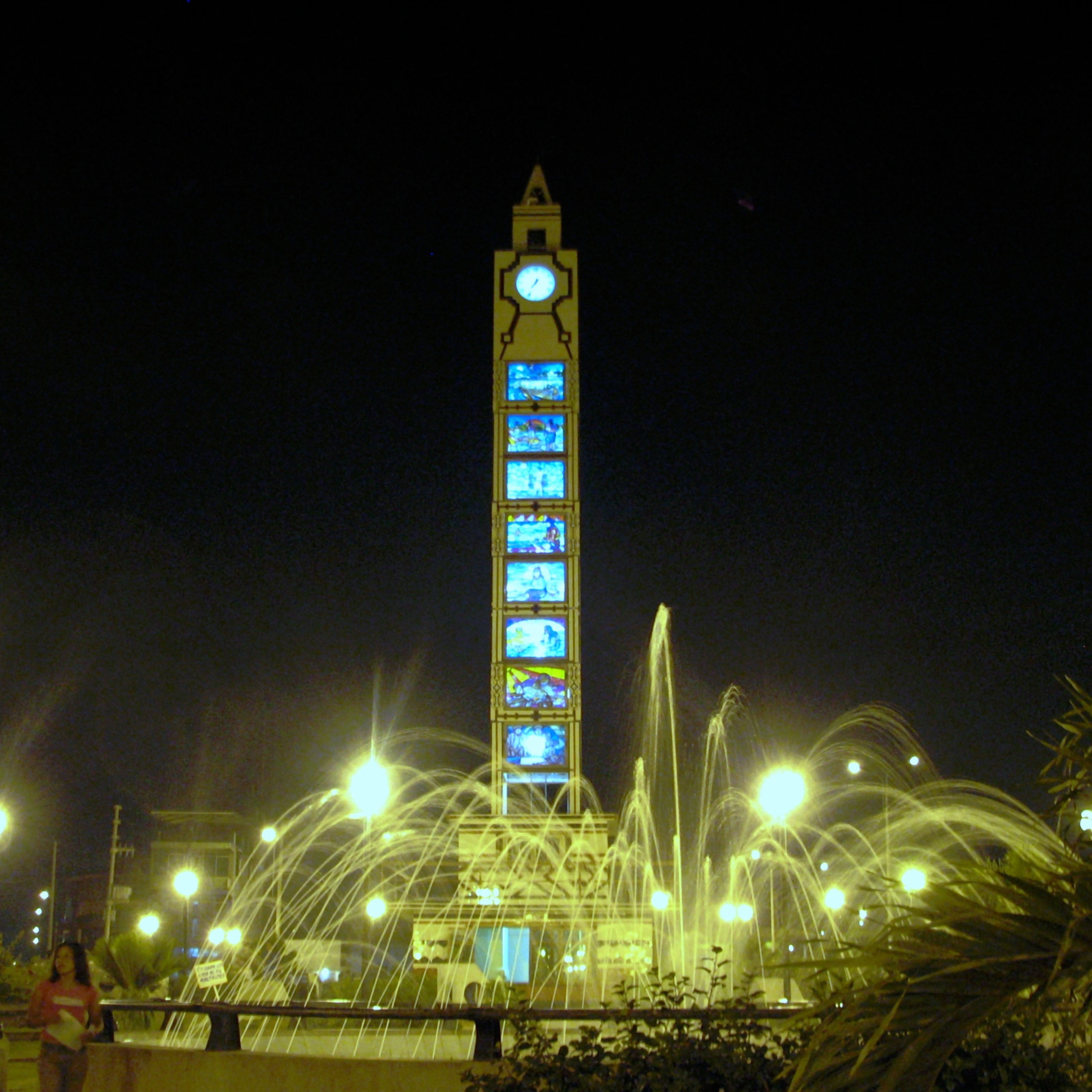
Fountain in the city of Pucallpa.

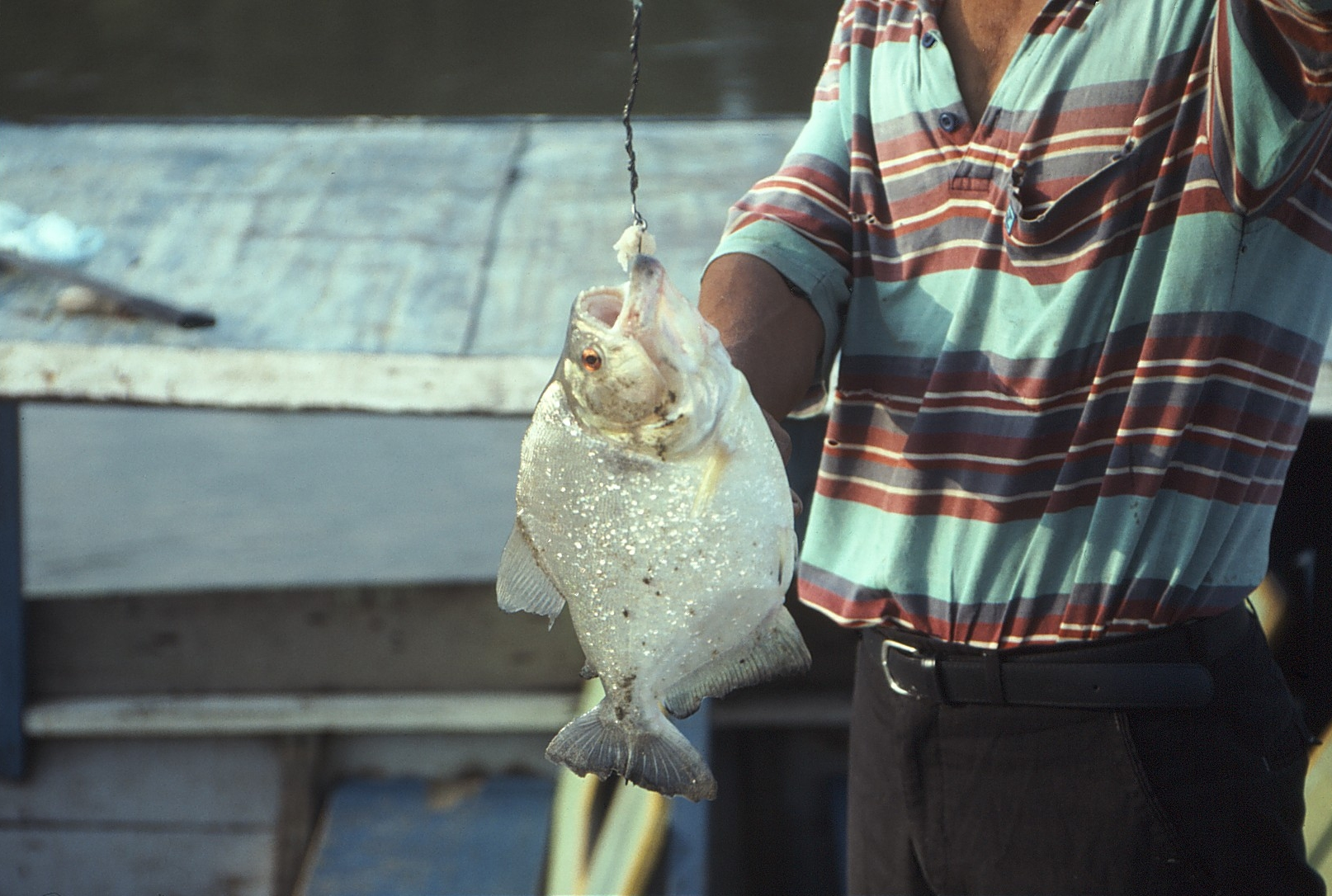
Fishing piranha on the Ucayali River.

Its name is derived from the Ucayali River.

== Geography ==
=== Boundaries ===
The Department of Ucayali is bordered by the Brazilian state of Acre on the east; the department of Madre de Dios on the southeast; Cusco on the south; Junín, Pasco and Huánuco on the west; and Loreto on the north.

=== Environment ===
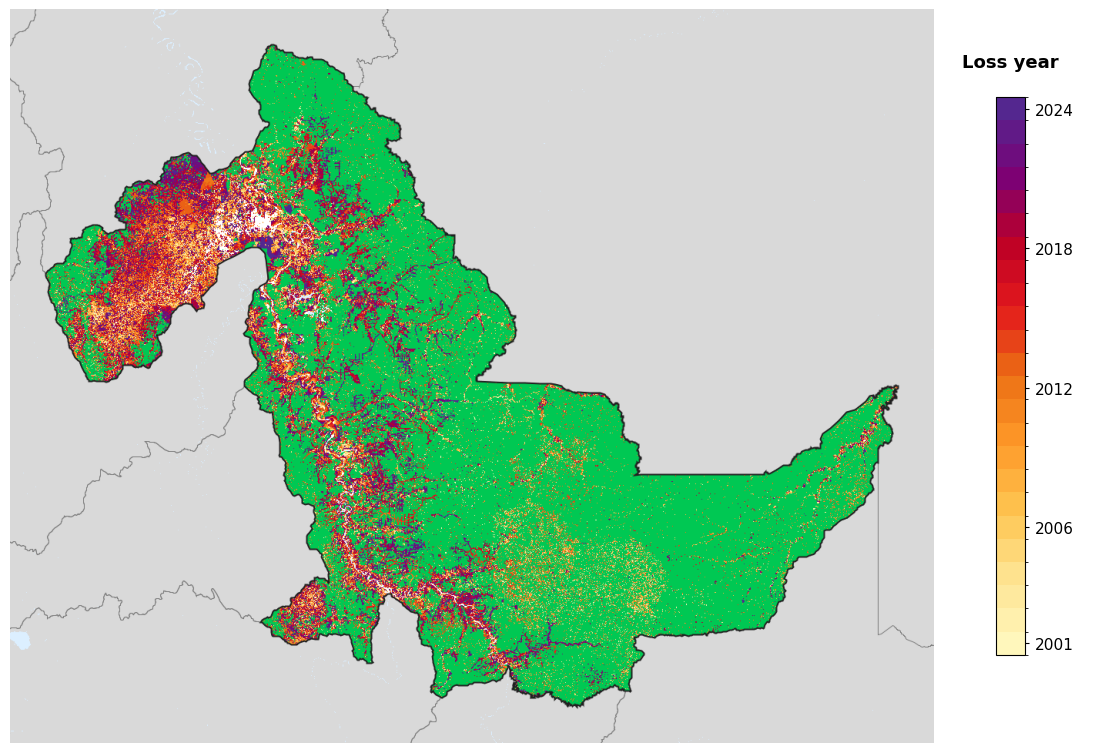
Tree-cover loss year in Ucayali, 2001-2024, from the Global Forest Change dataset.

Conservation International Peru lists an office in Pucallpa and has participated in conservation agreements linked to the Reserva Comunal El Sira and local livelihoods, including support for the women's association Wexa Beka.

== Demographics ==
=== Population ===
According to the 2007 Census, the Ucayali department has a population of 432,159 inhabitants, 51.4% of which (222,132) are male and 48.6% (210,027) are female. 75.3% of the population (325,347) live in urban areas while the remaining 24.7% (106,812) live in rural areas.

As of 2002, the Instituto Nacional de Estadística e Informática estimated the department's population to be 468,922.

=== Languages ===
Spanish is spoken as a first language by 87.6% of the population, while 4.1% speak Asháninka, 1.5% speak Quechua and 0.1% speak Aymara. Other indigenous languages, including Shipibo, are spoken by 6.6% of the population and 0.0% speak foreign languages.

=== Immigration ===
Persons originating from other departments of the country make up 34.7% of the population and 0.2% of residents were born abroad.

The largest immigrant groups come from the Loreto Region (12.5% of the total population).

=== Age ===
The population age distribution is 53.9% under the age of 20, 9.3% from 20 to 24, 25.4% from 25 to 44, 8.8% from 45 to 64, and 2.5% who are 65 years of age or older.

=== Education ===
Secondary education has been attended by 29% of the population and 2.3% also have graduated from non-university higher education, while 1.7% have complete university studies. 49.3% only have attended primary education and 9.1% have not had any education.

The illiteracy rate in the region is 14.2%

== Political division ==
The department is divided into 4 provinces (Spanish: provincias, singular: provincia), which are composed of 14 districts (distritos, singular: distrito).

=== Provinces ===
Map of provinces

The provinces, with their capitals in parentheses, are:

- Atalaya (Atalaya)
- Coronel Portillo (Pucallpa)
- Padre Abad (Aguaytía)
- Purús (Esperanza)

== Places of interest ==
- El Sira Communal Reserve
- Gran Pajonal
- Purús Communal Reserve
- Immaculate Conception Cathedral, Pucallpa
