= Borders of Brazil =

Political boundaries between Brazil and neighboring territories

Zoom in

Zoom out

Location of Brazil within South America

The borders of Brazil are the international borders that Brazil shares with neighbouring countries. Brazil has terrestrial boundaries with nine countries of South America, and with the French Department of Guiana. Brazil has borders with every country in South America with the exception of Chile and Ecuador, totalling 16,885 kilometres (10,492 mi). Brazil has the world's third longest land border, behind China and Russia.

== Bordering countries ==
The lengths of the borders Brazil shares with different countries, running counter-clockwise around Brazil from French Guiana to Uruguay, are listed below:

Country	Length (km)	Bordering Brazilian states	Border features	Border crossings	Article link
France (French Guiana)	730	Amapá	Oyapock	Franco-Brazilian Binational Bridge	Brazil–France border
Suriname	593	Amapá, Pará	Defined by the Treaty of Limits as the drainage divide between the Amazon basin to the south, and the basins of the rivers flowing north to the Atlantic Ocean		Brazil–Suriname border
Guyana	1,606	Pará, Roraima	Takutu River, Ireng River	Takutu River Bridge	Brazil–Guyana border
Venezuela	2,200	Amazonas, Roraima		Highway BR-174 near the Brazilian city Pacaraima	Brazil–Venezuela border
Colombia	1,644	Amazonas	Japurá River, Apaporis River, Traíra River, Papurí River, Vaupés River, Içana River, Rio Cuiari	The adjoining Colombian city Leticia and the Brazilian city Tabatinga	Brazil–Colombia border
Peru	2,995	Acre, Amazonas	Acre River, Javary River, Amazon River, Santa Rosa River, Purus River, 10th parallel south	Brazil-Peru Integration Bridge	Brazil–Peru border
Bolivia	3,423	Acre, Mato Grosso, Mato Grosso do Sul, Rondônia	Paraguay River, Tamengo Canal, Mandioré Lake, Madeira River, Mamoré River, Abuna River, Acre River	1. Wilson Pinheiro Binational Bridge (named Friendship Bridge by Bolivia) over the Acre River connecting the Bolivian city Cobija to the Brazilian city Brasiléia; 2. The adjoining Bolivian city Cobija and the Brazilian city Epitaciolândia; 3. A bridge over the Tamengo Canal joining the Bolivian city Puerto Quijarro and the Brazilian city Corumbá	Bolivia–Brazil border
Paraguay	1,365	Mato Grosso do Sul, Paraná	Paraná River, Itaipu Lake, Apa River, Paraguay River	1. A bridge crossing the Apa River connecting the Brazilian city Bela Vista and the Paraguayan city Bella Vista Norte; 2. The adjoining Brazilian city Paranhos and the Paraguayan city Ypehú; 3. Itaipu Dam; 4. Friendship Bridge	Brazil–Paraguay border
Argentina	1,261	Paraná, Rio Grande do Sul, Santa Catarina	Uruguay River, Pepiri-Guazu River, San Antonio River, Iguazu River, Iguazu Falls	1. Tancredo Neves Bridge; 2. Integration Bridge; 3. Paso de los Libres – Uruguaiana International Bridge; 4. Peperi-Guazu International Bridge; 5. The adjoining Argentinian city Bernardo de Irigoyen and Brazilian city Dionísio Cerqueira; 6. Commander Andresito International Bridge; 7. An unnamed bridge over the San Antonio River linking the Brazilian city Santo Antônio do Sudoeste and the Argentinian city San Antonio	Argentina–Brazil border
Uruguay	1,068	Rio Grande do Sul	Chuí Stream, Highway 19, Lagoon Mirim, Jaguarão River, San Luis River, Quaraí River	1. Baron of Mauá International Bridge; 2. The adjoining cities of Chuí (on the Brazilian side) and Chuy (on the Uruguayan side); 3. The Brazilian and Uruguayan cities named Aceguá; 4. The adjoining Uruguayan city Rivera and Brazilian city Santana do Livramento; 5. International Bridge of Concord; 6. Bella Unión - Barra do Quaraí International Bridge	Brazil-Uruguay border

Brazil's coastline with the Atlantic Ocean is 7,491 km, which is more than twice the length of its border with Bolivia, the longest land border.

== Border disputes ==
=== With Bolivia ===
- Isla Suárez (Bolivian name), or Ilha de Guajará-mirim (Brazilian name), a river island on the Mamoré River is claimed by both Bolivia and Brazil.

=== With Uruguay ===
- A triangular region, named Rincão de Artigas in Portuguese, is controlled by Brazil and claimed by Uruguay. The dispute is due to a disagreement as to where a stream known as Arroyo de la Invernada begins and where it ends.
- Brazilian Island, a river island at the junction of the Quaraí River and the Uruguay River on the border between Argentina, Brazil, and Uruguay is claimed by both Uruguay and Brazil. Brazil has de facto control of it.

== Water falls ==
With many of Brazil's borders defined by rivers, there are several water falls along the border. The most notable border water falls include the Iguazu Falls on the border with Argentina and Orinduik Falls on the border with Guyana.

Until 1982, the border with Paraguay contained the Guaíra Falls. The falls were submerged following the construction of the Itaipu Dam.

== Triple points ==
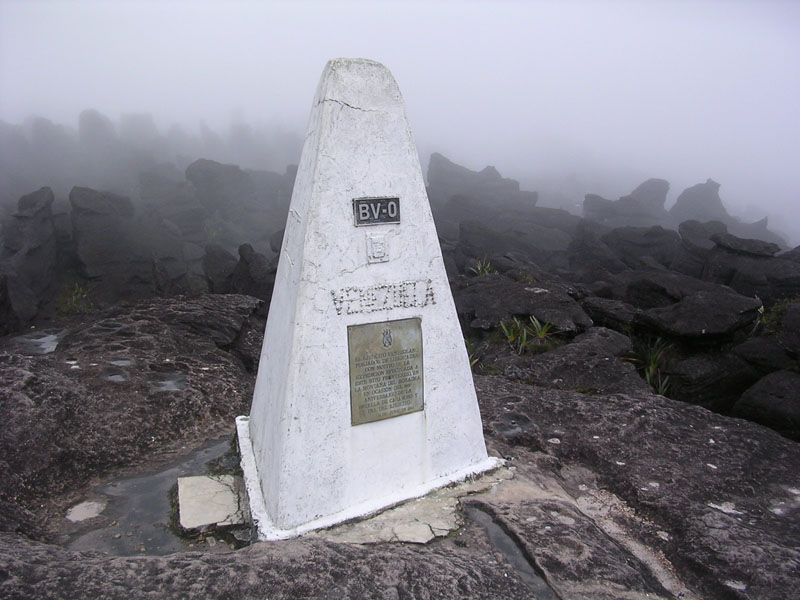
Tripoint between Brazil, Venezuela and Guyana located on Mount Roraima. Due to a border dispute between Venezuela and Guyana, Venezuela does not recognize this point as the tripoint.

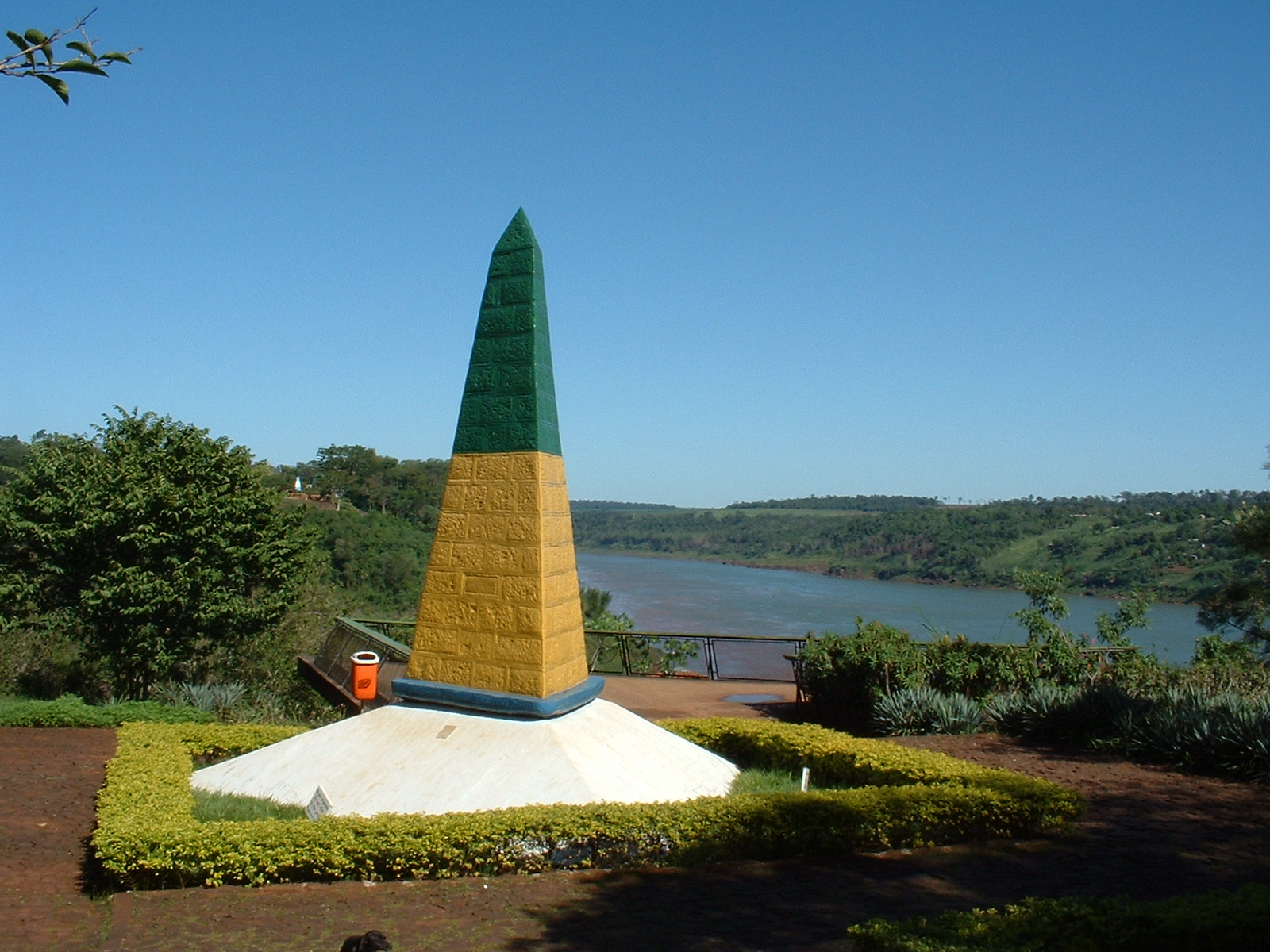
A monument on the Brazilian side of the tripoint of Brazil, Argentina, and Paraguay (the exact tripoint is in the water)

With 10 bordering countries forming a single incomplete ring around Brazil, the borders of Brazil include 9 triple points (also called tripoints) in which the borders of three countries join at a single point. A few of the triple points are notable:

- Mount Roraima: The tripoint of Brazil, Guyana and Venezuela. The marker was established by the British-Venezuelan Boundary Commission in 1905 following the 1899 Arbitral Award. Venezuela has since revived its claim to the disputed territory.
- San José Island: The tripoint of Brazil, Venezuela, and Colombia
- Tres Fronteras: The tripoint of Brazil, Peru, and Colombia.
- Assis Brasil, Bolpebra, Iñapari: The tripoint of Brazil, Bolivia, and Peru.
- Triple Frontier: The tripoint of Brazil, Argentina, and Paraguay.
- Brazilian Island: The tripoint of Brazil, Argentina, and Uruguay. Due to a border dispute between Brazil and Uruguay over the river island, the exact position of the tripoint is in dispute.

== Borders over time ==

Brazil in 1534: Western border defined by the 49th meridian west	Brazil in 1574: Western border defined by the 49th meridian west
Brazil in 1647: Following Dutch Invasion	Brazil in 1709
Brazil in 1750	Brazil in 1778
Brazil in 1817	Brazil in 1822: gained the province of Cisplatina and enlarged the province of Rio Grande do Sul
Brazil in 1851: lost the province of Cisplatina (which became Uruguay)	Brazil in 1889: gained territories from Bolivia and Paraguay
Brazil 1943-present: (Note: The displayed map is the current condition. The label "1943-present" is accurate for depicting Brazil's external borders. Interal state borders have seen several changes since 1943. From 1943-1946 Brazil had two states (Ponta Porã and Iguaçu) that have been absorbed into other states, in 1977 Mato Grosso do Sul split off from Mato Grosso, and in 1988 Tocantins split off from Goiás (see map of federal states that existed 1943-1946)) gained the territory that comprises the State of Acre and enlarged the province of Amazonas
