= BR-364 (Brazil highway) =

Highway in Brazil

BR-364
- Marechal Rondon Highway
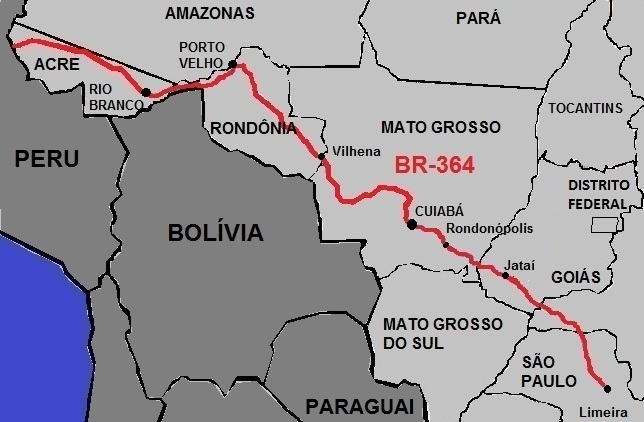

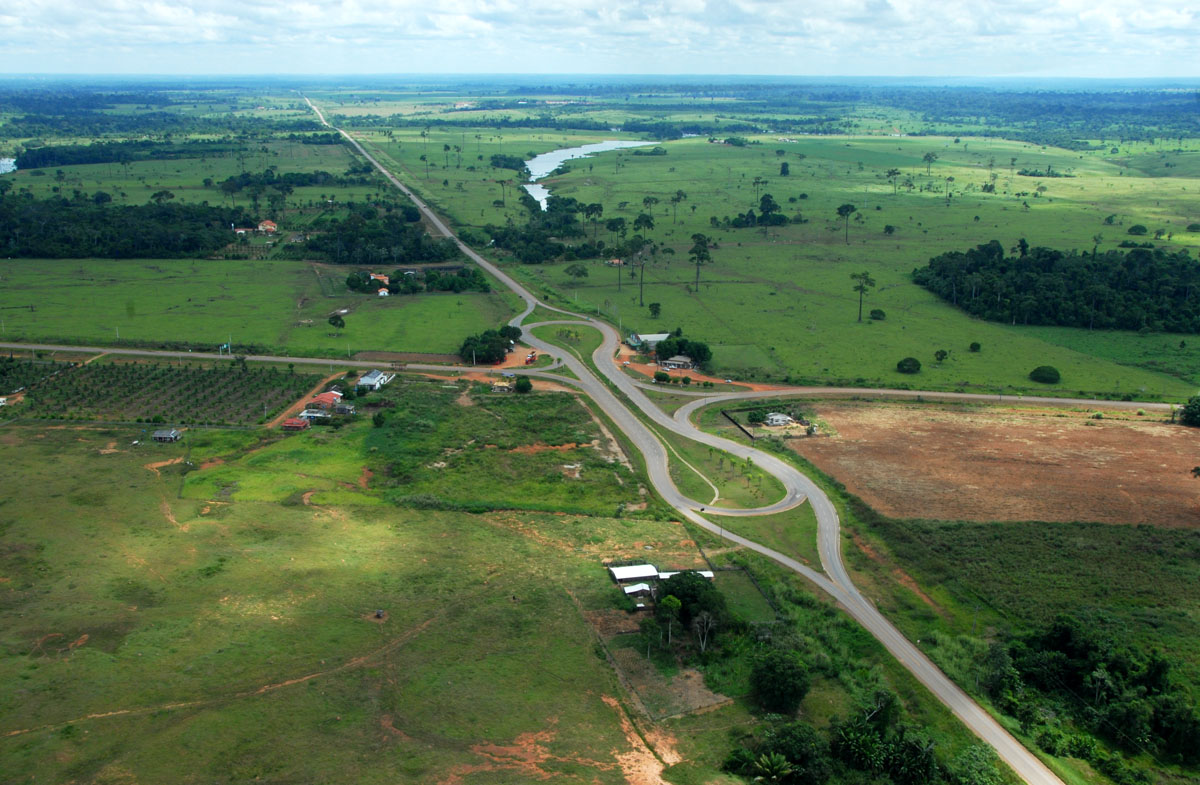
- Section of the highway in Acre

Route information
- Length: 4,324.6 km (2,687.2 mi)
- Existed: 1960–present

Major junctions
- Southeast end: Limeira, São Paulo
- São Paulo: BR-456, BR-265; Minas Gerais: BR-497, BR-365; Goiás: BR-483, BR-060, BR-359; Mato Grosso: BR-163, BR-070, BR-174; Mato Grosso/Rondônia: BR-153; Rondônia: BR-435, BR-429, BR-421, BR-319, BR-425; Acre: BR-317
- West end: Mâncio Lima, Acre

Location
- Country: Brazil

Highway system
- Highways in Brazil; Federal

BR-364 is an inter-state highway in Brazil connecting the southeast state of São Paulo to the western state of Acre. The highway was opened in the 1960s and paved in the 1980s. It has brought economic development and population growth, as well as an unprecedented process of deforestation in the Amazon basin states of Rondônia and Acre. It is also important for the flow of agricultural and livestock production in the states of Rondônia, Mato Grosso and Goiás, for Brazilian domestic consumption and for export, predominately by Port of Santos.

== Route ==
BR-364 starts in Limeira in São Paulo state and runs northwest through Minas Gerais, Goiás, Mato Grosso, Rondônia and Acre to Rodrigues Alves, then on to Mâncio Lima on the frontier with Peru. It passes through the cities of Cuiabá (Mato Grosso), Porto Velho (Rondônia) and Rio Branco (Acre). The all-weather highway gives the people of the remote Amazon states of Rondônia and Acre access to goods, services and people from the well-populated regions around São Paulo. The highway runs through the Cerrado, Pantanal and Amazon rainforest biomes, and through sugar cane, soy bean and cotton farming areas. In some areas it is poorly maintained. In western Rondônia a ferry used to be the only way to cross the Madeira River, but in May 2021 the Abunã Bridge opened, finally linking Acre and western Rondônia to the rest of Brazil by road.

== Duplication ==
In the state of Mato Grosso, the Federal Government has been doubling BR 364 between the cities of Cuiabá and Rondonópolis, a stretch of 191 km. At the end of 2018, the duplication of the section between the cities of Cuiabá and Jaciara, about 100 kilometers, was inaugurated. As of March 2019, there were already 151 duplicate km, and the forecast for completion of work was 2020.

== History ==
=== Early years ===
Construction was started in 1961 by President Juscelino Kubitschek. The road would be used to transport cassiterite to industries in the east, and to open the west for settlement. BR-364 and the BR-230 Trans-Amazonian Highway were intended to integrate, protect and bring people to the "undeveloped, unproductive and empty" Amazon. BR-364 was the first main road between the Amazon basin and the rest of Brazil, and was intended to provide an access route for developing infrastructure between Cuiabá and Porto Velho. It connected São Paulo to the west of Acre.

== Interoceanic Highway ==
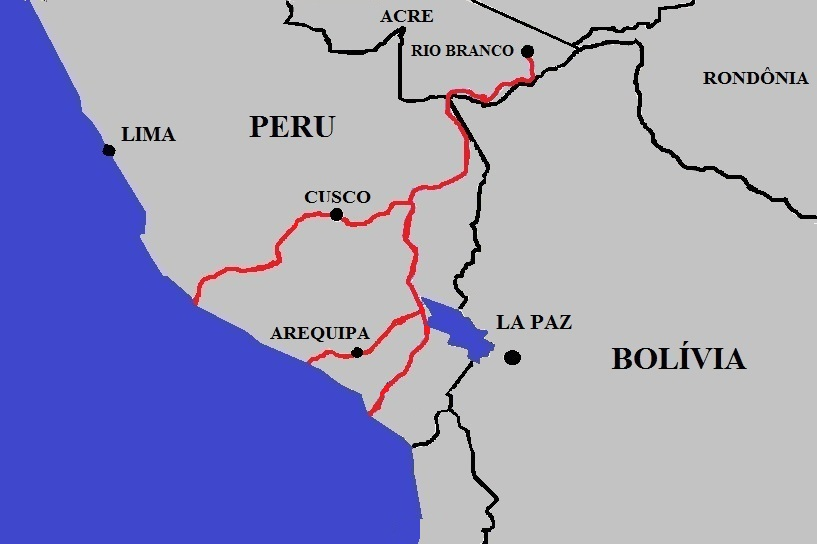
Interoceanic Highway.

The Interoceanic Highway or Trans-oceanic highway is an international, transcontinental highway in Peru and Brazil to connect the two countries. The east–west passageway spans 2600 kilometers. From Peru's Pacific Ocean coastline, it continues across the Andes mountains and through a large part of the Amazon rainforest in the Peruvian department of Madre de Dios. It then travels into Brazil where it connects with a network of existing highways to the Atlantic. It entailed the renovation and construction of roughly 2,600 kilometers of roads and 22 bridges. Completed in 2011, it creates a connected highway from the Peruvian ports of San Juan de Marcona to Brazilian ports and cities throughout the City of Rio Branco ZPE (Special Export Zone). The project came into being via a 2004 agreement between the presidents of the two countries.

In Peru the project is known by the MTC (Ministerio de Transportes y Comunicaciones) as the Corredor Vial Interoceánico Sur Perú-Brasil and by ProInversion (Private Investment Promotion Agency - Peru) as the Initiative for the Integration of the Regional Infrastructure of South America (Iniciativa para la Integración de la Infraestructura Regional Suramericana) (IIRSA), SUR axis. The project is part of a national road investment plan which involves the construction of three longitudinal highways, and 20 transversal highways. Parts of these transversal highways make up part of IIRSA SUR.

As the project now links three Peruvian ports to Brazil, the route has several branches. Furthermore, the construction of the various branches has been divided up into a number of stretches or sections, each of which has been constructed as part of a separate concession. Five concessions were constructed in two blocks:

- block of concessions awarded in 2005:
  - 2: Urcos (near Cusco) - Inambari, Inambari District (in the Amazon Basin, near Puerto Maldonado); 300 km of previously unpaved roads
  - 3: Inambari - Iñapari, Iñapari District (on the Brazilian Border, opposite the Brazilian town of Assis Brasil); 403 km of previously unpaved roads
  - 4: Azangaro - Inambari; 306 km of previously unpaved roads
- block of concessions awarded in 2007:
  - 1: San Juan de Marcona (Pacific Ocean) - Nazca - Abancay - Cusco – Urcos; 763 km of previously paved roads
  - 5: branch 1 Matarani (Pacific Ocean) - Arequipa - Juliaca (near Lake Titicaca) - Azangaro; and branch 2 Ilo (Pacific Ocean) - Moquegua - Humajalso - Puente Gallatini - Puno - Juliaca; 752 km of previously paved roads and 62 km of previously unpaved roads

In June 2005, the second, third, and fourth sections were leased to specialized Peruvian and Brazilian consortia of private companies for 25 years, in which they will be responsible for looking after the highway, the built and forthcoming bridges, and tollbooths. The first and the last section were leased in 2007. The Brazilian section runs from the border town of Assis Brasil via BR-317 into the main Brazilian road network through Porto Velho and Cuiabá via BR-364.

The total project has an estimated cost of US$1.3 billion, but some analysts predict a higher cost. Of this, about US$810 million is for stretches 2–4, $199 million is for stretches 1 and 5, and the remainder for bridges, urban connections, and overhead. The project employed about 6,000 people during construction. It was inaugurated by Peruvian President Garcia in August 2011.

== Economy by state ==
=== Rondônia ===
Rondônia stands out in the production of coffee (largest producer in the North and 5th largest in Brazil), cocoa (2nd largest producer in the North and 3rd largest in Brazil), beans (2nd largest producer in the North), corn (2nd largest producer in the North region), soybean (3rd largest producer in the North region), rice (3rd largest producer in the North region) and cassava (4th largest producer in the North region). Despite the large volume of production and the small territory by the region's standards (7 times smaller than Amazonas and 6 times smaller than Pará), Rondônia still has more than 60% of its territory fully preserved. The state of Rondônia has dozens of indigenous reserves in the east and west (BR-364 cuts the state in half), blocking the opening of highways and farms in the state.

In coffee production, Rondônia was, in 2019, the 5th largest producer in the country, being the 2nd largest producer of Coffea canephora, getting a total of 2.3 million bags of 60 kg of coffee (near 138,000 tons) this year.

In soy, in the 2019 Brazilian harvest, Rondônia harvested 1.2 million tons, 3rd in the North Region.

In 2019, the state produced 805,000 tons of corn, second largest production in the northern region, losing only to Tocantins.

In cassava production, Brazil produced a total of 17.6 million tons in 2018. Rondônia was the 11th largest producer in the country, with 583,000 tons.

In 2018, Rondônia produced 124,000 tons of rice.

In the production of cocoa, Pará has been competing with Bahia for the leadership of Brazilian production. In 2019, Pará harvested 135,000 tons of cocoa, and Bahians harvested 130,000 tons. Rondônia is the 3rd largest cocoa producer in the country, with 18,000 tons harvested in 2017.

In 2017, the state had a cattle herd of 14,098,031 head of cattle (73.37% for beef and the rest for dairy), second largest herd in the North, second only to Pará, being the 6th largest in the country, 5th in meat exports and 8th in milk production. The state's milk production in 2018 was around 800 million liters, the largest producer in the North.

In 2017, Rondônia had 0.62% of the national mineral participation (8th place in the country). Rondônia had production of tin (10,900 tons at a value of R$333 million), gold (1 ton at a value of R$125 million), niobium (in the form of columbita-tantalita) (3,500 tons at R$24 million), and zinc in gross form (26,000 tons at R$27 million). In addition, in gemstones, the state has some production of garnet.

In industry, Rondônia had an industrial GDP of R$8.2 billion in 2017, equivalent to 0.7% of the national industry. It employs 49,944 workers in the industry. The main industrial sectors are: Industrial Services of Public Utility, such as Electricity and Water (54.4%), Construction (19.2%), Food (17.6%), Wood (1.8%) and Non-metallic minerals (1.2%). These 5 sectors concentrate 94.2% of the state's industry.

=== Mato Grosso ===
In 2020, Mato Grosso was the leader in the national grain production, with 28.0%. It is the largest producer of soy in Brazil, with 26.9% of the total produced in 2020 (33.0 million tons); the largest producer of corn in the country; the largest producer of cotton in Brazil, with around 65% of national production (1.8 out of the 2.8 million tons harvested in the country); the 6th largest producer of sugarcane in the country, 16 million tons harvested in the 2019–20 harvest; and the 3rd largest producer of beans, with 10.5% of Brazilian production. In sunflower, the state was the largest national producer in 2019, with 60,000 tons. In cassava production, Brazil produced a total of 17.6 million tons and Mato Grosso produced 287,000 tons in 2018.

In 2019, the cattle herd from Mato Grosso reached the mark of thirty million cattle, the largest cattle herd in the country, representing almost 14% of national production alone. In 2018, Mato Grosso was the fifth largest pork producer in the country, with a herd of around 2.5 million animals.

In 2017, Mato Grosso had 1.15% of the national mineral participation (5th place in the country). Mato Grosso had production of gold (8.3 tons at a value of R$1 billion) and tin (536 tons at a value of R$16 million). In addition, in gemstones, the state is the 2nd largest national producer of diamond, having extracted 49,000 carats in the year 2017. The city of Juína is the main one in this activity in the state. The state also has a small production of sapphire and jasper.

Mato Grosso had an industrial GDP of R$17.0 billion in 2017, equivalent to 1.4% of the national industry. It employs 141,121 workers in the industry. The main industrial sectors are: construction (32.0%), food (27.9%), industrial services of public utility, such as electricity and water (18.6%), beverages (4.5%), and oil products oil and biofuels (3.9%). These 5 sectors concentrate 86.9% of the state's industry.

=== Goiás ===
Goiás is a leader in the country in crop raising. In 2016, Goiás had the 3rd largest cattle herd in Brazil: 22.6 million head of cattle. The number of pigs in Goiás was approximately 2.0 million head in 2015. The state had the 6th largest Brazilian herd, 5% of the national herd. Among the municipalities in Goiás that stood out, Rio Verde had the 3rd largest national population. In 2016, Goiás was the 4th largest milk producer, accounting for 10.1% of the country's milk production. The number of chickens in the State was 64.2 million head in 2015. The production of chicken eggs this year was 188 million dozens. Goiás was the 9th largest producer of eggs, 5% of national production.

Agriculture as a total represented 21% of the GDP of the state. The state of Goiás stands out in the production of sugarcane, corn, soy, sorghum, beans, sunflower, tomato, garlic, in addition to also producing cotton, rice, coffee and wheat. In 2019, Goiás was the Brazilian state with the 4th highest grain production, 10% of the national production. Goiás is the 2nd largest producer of sugarcane in the country, 11.3% of national production, with 75.7 million tons harvested in the 2019–20 harvest. In the same year, it was the 4th largest producer of soy, with 12.46 million tons. It has the national leadership in the production of sorghum: it produced 44% of the Brazilian crop production in the 2019–2020 cycle, with a harvest of 1.09 million tons. In 2017, it was the 4th largest producer of corn in the country. The state is also the Brazilian leader in tomato production: in 2019 it produced over 1.2 million tons, a third of the country's total production. In 2019, Goiás became the leader of the Brazilian production of garlic. Goiás was the 4th largest producer of beans in Brazil in the 2017–18 harvest, with 374 thousand tons, and has about 10% of the country's production. The state is also in 3rd place in the national production of cotton, however, most of the national production is from Mato Grosso and Bahia – Goiás has only 2.3% of participation. In sunflower, in 2020 Goiás was the 2nd largest national producer, with 41.8%, losing only from Mato Grosso. In rice, Goiás is the 8th largest producer in Brazil, with 1% of national production.

Minerals are also important with the state being a major producer of nickel, copper, gold, niobium and aluminum (bauxite). Goiás had 4.58% of the national mineral participation (3rd place in the country) in 2017. At nickel, Goiás and Pará are the only two producers in the country, Goiás being the 1st in production, having obtained 154 thousand tons at a value of R$1.4 billion. In copper, it was the 2nd largest producer in the country, with 242,000 tons, at a value of R$1.4 billion. In gold, it was the 4th largest producer in the country, with 10.2 tons, at a value of R$823 million. In niobium (in the form of pyrochlorine), it was the 2nd largest producer in the country, with 27,000 tons, at a value of R$312 million. In aluminum (bauxite), it was the 3rd largest producer in the country, with 766,000 tons, at a value of R$51 million.

In gemstones, Goiás is one of the emerald producing states in Brazil. Campos Verdes is considered the "Capital of the Emeralds". The state also has known production of tourmaline (Brazil is one of the biggest productors of this gem), and sapphire (in a scarce mode).

The strongest growing area in the state has been in industry and commerce. Goiás had in 2017 an industrial GDP of R$37.1 billion, equivalent to 3.1% of the national industry. It employs 302,952 workers in the industry. The main industrial sectors are: construction (25.6%), food (25.2%), industrial public utility services, such as electricity and water (17.2%), petroleum products and biofuels (7.4%), and chemicals (3.7%). These 5 sectors concentrate 79.1% of the state's industry.

Goiânia and Aparecida de Goiânia have become centers of food-processing industries, Anápolis of pharmaceutical factories. Rio Verde, in the southwest, is one of the fastest growing small cities with many new industries locating in the area and Catalão is a metal-mechanical and chemical center.

In Brazil, the automotive sector represents close to 22% of industrial GDP. Goiás has Mitsubishi, Suzuki and Hyundai factories.

== Sources ==
- Barbosa, Luiz C. (2000), The Brazilian Amazon Rainforest: Global Ecopolitics, Development, and Democracy, University Press of America, ISBN 978-0-7618-1522-8
- Brazil's Infrastructure, MPOG, 2016-06-13, GGKEY:WXX69UUNKS2
- Cooper, James M.; Hunefeldt, Christine (2013), Amazonia: Environment and the Law in Amazonia : a Plurilateral Encounter, Sussex Academic Press, ISBN 978-1-84519-500-7
- Dijck, Pitou van (2013-03-07), The Impact of the IIRSA Road Infrastructure Programme on Amazonia, Routledge, ISBN 978-0-415-53108-5
- Fearnside, Philip M. (January 2005), "Brazil's Samuel Dam: lessons for hydroelectric development policy and the environment in Amazonia", Environ Manage, 35 (1), National Institute for Research in the Amazon: 6
- Hobbs, Joseph (2016-01-30), Fundamentals of World Regional Geography, Cengage Learning, ISBN 978-1-305-85495-6
- Reid, Michael (2014-05-27), Brazil: The Troubled Rise of a Global Power, Yale University Press, ISBN 978-0-300-16560-9
- Rodrigues, Gomercindo (2009-03-06), Walking the Forest with Chico Mendes: Struggle for Justice in the Amazon, University of Texas Press, ISBN 978-0-292-77454-4
- Schmink, Marianne; Wood, Charles H. (2013-08-13), Contested Frontiers in Amazonia, Columbia University Press, ISBN 978-0-231-51388-3
- Sills, Erin O; Atmadja, Stibniati S; Sassi, Claudio de; Duchelle, Amy E; Kweka, Demetrius; Resosudarmo, Ida Aju Pradnja; Sunderlin, William D (2014-12-24), REDD+ on the ground: A case book of subnational initiatives across the globe, CIFOR, ISBN 978-602-1504-55-0
- Smith, Nigel J. H. (1995), Amazonia, United Nations University Press, ISBN 978-92-808-0906-0
- Trabalka, John R.; Reichle, David E. (2013-03-09), The Changing Carbon Cycle: A Global Analysis, Springer Science & Business Media, ISBN 978-1-4757-1915-4
- Vosti, Stephen A.; Witcover, Julie; Carpentier, Chantal Line (2002-01-01), Agricultural Intensification by Smallholders in the Western Brazilian Amazon: From Deforestation to Sustainable Land Use, Intl Food Policy Res Inst, ISBN 978-0-89629-132-4
