= Interoceanic Highway =

Highway in Peru and Brazil

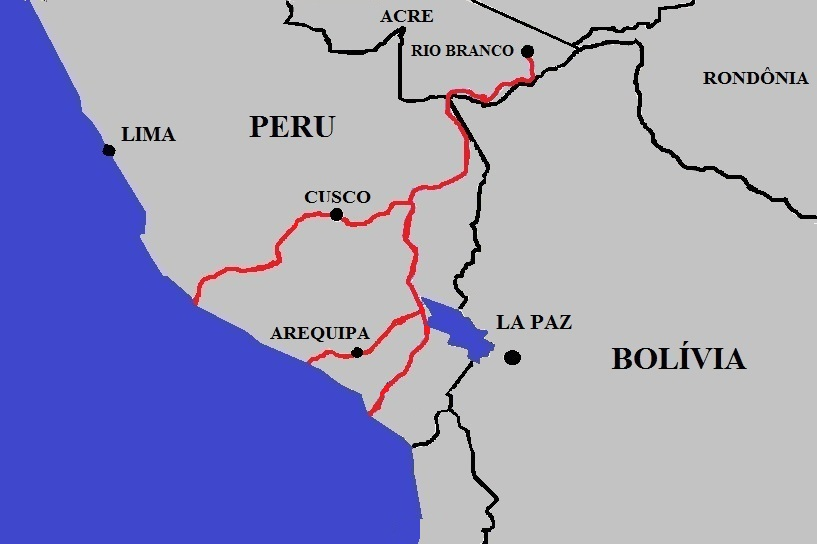
Interoceanic Highway

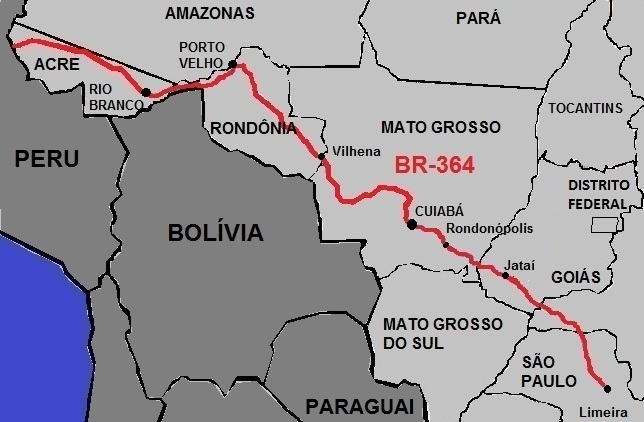
BR-364

The Interoceanic Highway or Trans-oceanic highway is an international, transcontinental highway in Peru and Brazil that connects the two countries. It was completed in 2011, and runs east to west, spanning 2,600 kilometres (1,600 mi).

Its construction entailed the renovation and construction of roughly 2,600 kilometers of roads and 22 bridges. Completed in 2011, the project came into being via a 2004 agreement between Alejandro Toledo and Luiz Inácio Lula da Silva, then the presidents of the two countries.

== Construction ==
In Peru the project is known by the MTC (Ministerio de Transportes y Comunicaciones) as the Corredor Vial Interoceánico Sur Perú-Brasil and by ProInversion (Private Investment Promotion Agency - Peru) as the Initiative for the Integration of the Regional Infrastructure of South America, (Iniciativa para la Integración de la Infraestructura Regional Suramericana) (IIRSA), SUR axis. The project is part of a national road investment plan that includes the construction of three longitudinal highways and 20 transversal highways, parts of which make up part of IIRSA SUR.

As the project now links three Peruvian ports to Brazil, the route has several branches. Furthermore, the construction of the various branches has been divided up into a number of stretches or sections, each of which has been constructed as part of a separate concession. Five concessions were constructed in two blocks:

- block of concessions awarded in 2005:
  - 2: Urcos (near Cusco) - Inambari, Inambari District (in the Amazon Basin, near Puerto Maldonado); 300 km of previously unpaved roads
  - 3: Inambari - Iñapari, Iñapari District (on the Brazilian Border, opposite the Brazilian town of Assis Brasil); 403 km of previously unpaved roads
  - 4: Azangaro - Inambari; 306 km of previously unpaved roads
- block of concessions awarded in 2007:
  - 1: San Juan de Marcona (Pacific Ocean) - Nazca - Abancay - Cusco – Urcos; 763 km of previously paved roads
  - 5: branch 1 Matarani (Pacific Ocean) - Arequipa - Juliaca (near Lake Titicaca) - Azangaro; and branch 2 Ilo (Pacific Ocean) - Moquegua - Humajalso - Puente Gallatini - Puno - Juliaca; 752 km of previously paved roads and 62 km of previously unpaved roads

The Brazilian section runs from the tri-border town of Assis Brasil to the intersection with the main Brazilian road network in Rio Branco, via the BR-317, in this case, the road leading to the Atlantic, being the BR-364, connecting São Paulo to elsewhere.

At the start of the project, its total cost was estimated at US$1.3 billion. Of this, about US$810 million was allocated to sections 2 to 4, US$199 million to sections 1 and 5, and the rest to bridges, urban connections, and overhead. The final cost, however, was considerably higher. For the 650 kilometre section built by Odebrecht alone, Peru ultimately ended up paying US$1.25 billion, compared with an initial estimate of just US$507 million.

The project employed about 6,000 people during construction. It was inaugurated by Peruvian President Alan García in August 2011 and is now officially complete and operational.

== Route ==
From Peru's Pacific Ocean coastline, it continues across the Andes mountains and through a large part of the Amazon rainforest in the Peruvian department of Madre de Dios. After passing by the regionally important cities of Cusco, Cobija and Rio Branco, it then travels into Northwestern Brazil where it connects with a network of existing highways to the Atlantic. it creates a connected highway from the Peruvian ports of San Juan de Marcona to the Brazilian city of Rio Branco its ZPE (Special Export Zone) and the rest of the country.

== Andean watershed crossings ==
Two branches of the Interoceanic Highway cross the main Andean watershed. The Urcos - Inambari branch crosses the watershed about 7 km (in a straight line) north-east of Urcos (the road distance is much longer). The Azangaro - Inambari branch crosses the watershed approximately 85 km north of Azangaro.

== Practical results ==
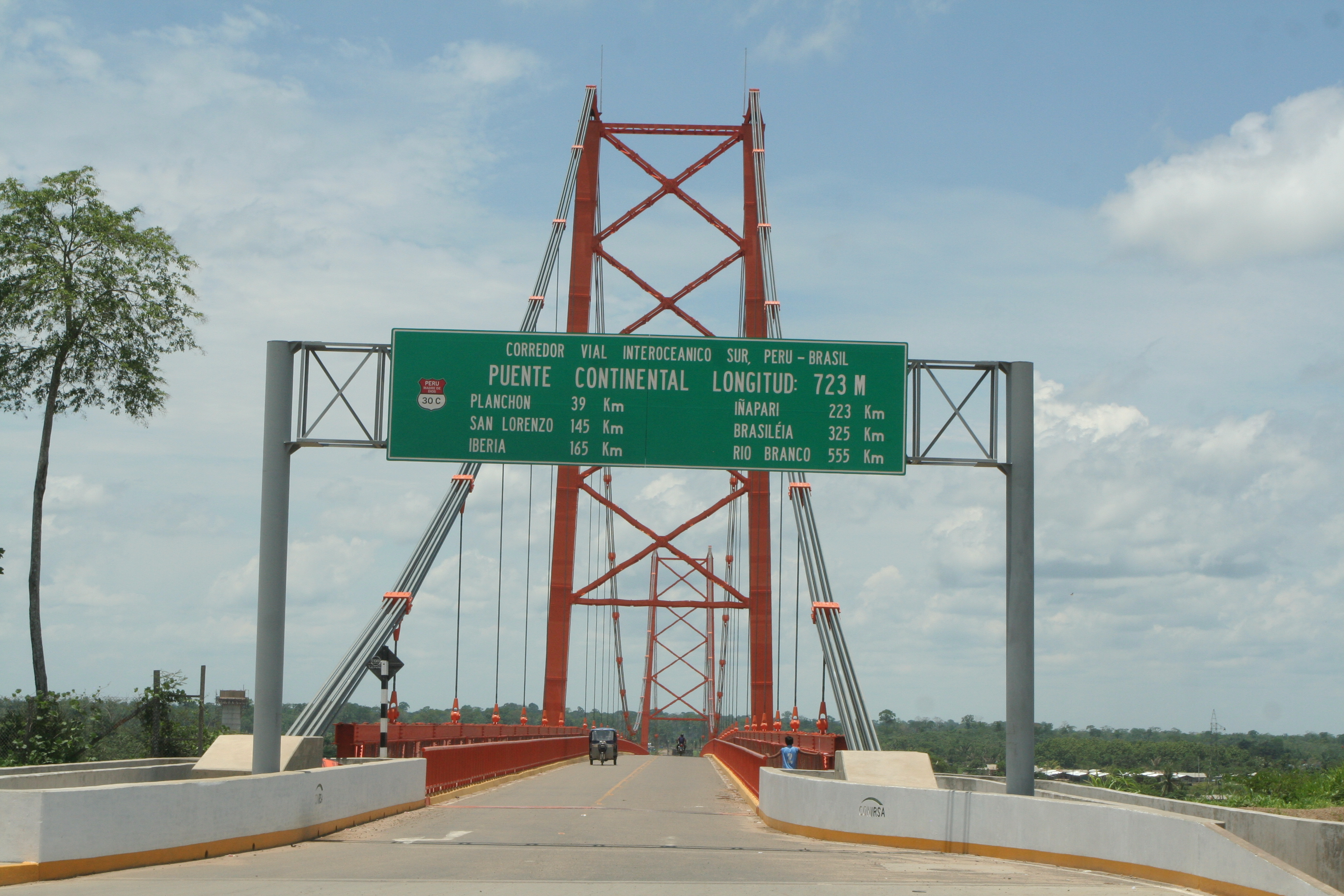
A bridge in Peru over the Madre de Dios River on the Interoceanic Highway, linking the Pacific Ocean to northwestern Brazil

In 2017, it was found that the highway was practically not being used to trade. The average circulation was only seven commercial vehicles per hour, an extremely low average. According to the Peruvian authorities, there were basically no Brazilian products on the way to the ports in Peru.

In 2020, official figures showed that, of the US$246 million exported or imported by Acre between 2009 and 2019, just over 18% were made by the road (about US$44.6 million was the value of the goods transacted by highway).

This was largely because Acre had no direct road connection with the rest of Brazil. Although the BR-364 exists, there was no road bridge over the Madeira River, between the cities of Rio Branco and Porto Velho, Rondônia; the crossing of vehicles was made by ferries, which have low capacity and are expensive. However, the Abunã bridge was built and completed in 2021; As a result, Acre came out of road isolation and will develop in the coming years.

== Corruption ==
The highway's construction, contractual scheme and overall related events have been linked to corruption and irregularities. The construction contract for the section of the highway linking Brazil to the South of Peru was awarded to the Brazilian construction company Odebrecht. According to journalist Enrique Vera, the project did not go through Peru's National System of Public Investment (SNIP). The 650 kilometre section was initially estimated to cost around US$507 million, however, Peru ended up ultimately paying up to US$1.25 billion for it, more than double of what the initial contract stated and what the Brazilian constructor had agreed to. In December 2016, Odebrecht pleaded guilty in a US court case to paying approximately US$788 million in bribes to government officials not only in Peru but in several countries. According to the US Department of Justice, the company ran a hidden "Division of Structured Operations" which functioned as a bribery department.

In late October 2024, a Peruvian court sentenced former president Alejandro Toledo to 20 years and 6 months in prison after he was found guilty of accepting US$35 million in bribes from the Brazilian constructor Odebrecht in exchange for the construction contract. Toledo was declared a fugitive in 2017 after traveling to the United States, for which he was extradited to Peru in April 2023. He then denied the allegations on multiple occasions which included money laundering and collusion. During the trial against the former president, Jorge Barata, a former Odebrecht executive in Peru, formed part of the case against Toledo as a testimony. He told the prosecutors that Toledo had called him numerous times after leaving the office demanding the payments from the company to be done and completed.

According to the International Consortium of Investigative Journalists (ICIJ), Odebrecht's original contract covered sections 2 and 3 of the Interoceanic Highway, the stretch running from Urcos through Madre de Dios and onto the Brazilian border. The ICIJ, citing reports by the Peruvian outlet Convoca, noted that the estimated costs for the highway rose from originally around US$800 million, to nearly US$2 billion. In court, Toledo maintained his story and innocence, stating that he "never made any arrangement with Mr. Barata". He is one of four former Peruvian presidents investigated for allegedly receiving bribes from Odebrecht.

== Environmental impact ==
The highway crosses the Amazon Rainforest in the Department of Madre de Dios located in the Peruvian jungle. According to journalist Enrique Vera, the project did not have any comprehensive environmental impact assessment, particularly for the Amazonian section of the route and highway. Vera also reports that the rate of deforestation in the southeastern Peruvian Amazon (the zone where the highway passes through) increased by 425% during the highway's construction between 2006 and 2011.

A 2018 study, analyzing 34 years of satellite imagery from 1984 to 2017, found that nearly 100,000 hectares of forest in the region had been lost to gold mining, mostly illegal, about 21% more than previous estimates. Around 35,000 hectares were cleared during the highway's construction (2006 to 2012) and a further 41,000 hectares in the five years after it was paved. The study identified that the highway was a major driver of this expansion, as it reduced the travel time from the Andean highlands from days to only hours and made it easier for miners to transport fuel and machinery into the region. Between 2012 and 2017, gold prices fell by 26% while deforestation from mining increased by 53%, suggesting that gold prices alone cannot explain this increase.

Deforestation along the highway has not been driven only by mining. A 2020 study of land cover change in the region between 1993 and 2013 found that the paving of the highway in 2010 brought rapid population growth, and that agricultural expansion along the road broke the forest north of it into numerous small fragments. The study attributed this deforestation as something caused and triggered by the spread of the road network.

The expansion of gold mining linked to the highway has also affected the health of nearby residents. A 2022 study of 418 adults in 46 communities within 10 km of the highway, which attributed the mining's growth partly due to the highway's paving, found higher levels of arsenic and cadmium in people living in mining-affected areas and higher mercury and lead levels among those who ate more locally caught fish. The study concluded that mining-related exposure was widespread and not limited to miners.

== Other Trans-Andean transport projects ==
In July 2011, a separate route known as IIRSA Norte was completed between the Pacific port Paita and the Amazon river port of Yurimaguas, both in Peru. The road, about 955 km long, connects to river transport toward Manaus in Brazil.

== See also ==
- Transoceánica (bus route)

== Bibliography ==
- Rapp, Kenn (2005-12-30). "The Brazil-Peru Trans-Oceanic Highway: Project Summary". BICECA: Building Informed Civic Engagement for Conservation in the Andes-Amazon. Bank Information Center. Archived from the original on 2011-09-05.
- "Southern Interoceanic Highway (Peru-Brazil)". BIC - Bank Information Center. Archived from the original on December 26, 2010.
- "Inicio MTC > Concesiones en transportes > Concesiones otorgadas > Redes Viales > Ejes IIRSA". Ministerio de Transportes y Comunicaciones – MTC. Archived from the original on 2011-07-22. (search for 'Corredor Vial Interoceánico')
