= Marcona =

Marcona may refer to:

- Marcona District, Nazca Province, Peru
  - San Juan de Marcona, capital of Marcona District
  - Marcona Mine, an open-pit iron mine in Marcona District
- Marcona, an almond cultivar
