= Iñapari (disambiguation) =

Iñapari may refer to:

- Iñapari, a Peruvian village
- Iñapari District, in Peru
- Iñapari language, spoken in Peru
