= Reichle =

Reichle is a surname. Notable people with the surname include:

- Art Reichle (1914–2000), American college baseball coach
- David Edward Reichle (born 1938), American ecologist
- Dick Reichle (1896–1967), American baseball player
- Jan Reichle, Australian cinematographer
- Brian Reichle, American comedian and podcast producer

== See also ==
- Reichle Mesa, mesa in Graham Land, Antarctica
- Reichle & De-Massari, Swiss technology company
