= Treaty of Rio de Janeiro =

Treaty of Rio de Janeiro may refer to:

- Treaty of Rio de Janeiro (1825)
- Preliminary Peace Convention (1828)
- Treaty of Rio de Janeiro (1909)
