= Novo Rio Bus Terminal =

Bus terminal in Rio de Janeiro

Novo Rio Bus Terminal Terminal Rodoviário Novo Rio
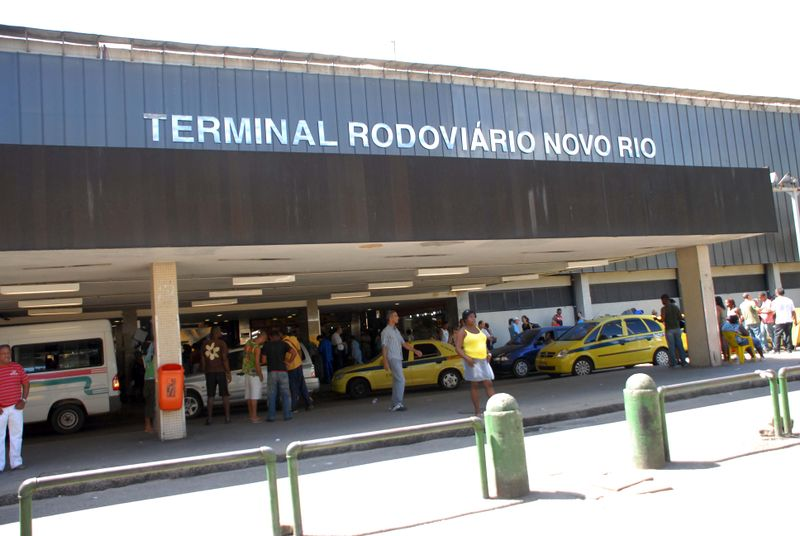
- Novo Rio Bus Terminal

General information
- Other names: Terminal Rodoviário do Rio de Janeiro
- Location: Santo Cristo, Rio de Janeiro
- Coordinates: 22.8993°S 43.2089°W
- Bus operators: Socicam

Other information
- Website: www.novorio.com.br

History
- Opened: 1969
Location
- Location within Rio de Janeiro

Novo Rio Bus Terminal (Portuguese: Terminal Rodoviário Novo Rio) is the main bus station in Rio de Janeiro, Rio de Janeiro State, Brazil. The terminal was constructed in 1965 and was built for the proximity to Centro and key routes in and out of Rio de Janeiro.

== Services ==
The station has services to the state of Rio de Janeiro as well as other areas of Brazil and neighbouring countries such as Argentina, Chile, Paraguay and Bolivia.

The world's longest active bus route, the Transoceánica, begins at Novo Rio.
