= São Borja =

Municipality of Rio Grande do Sul, Brazil

- Municipality
- Municipality of São Borja
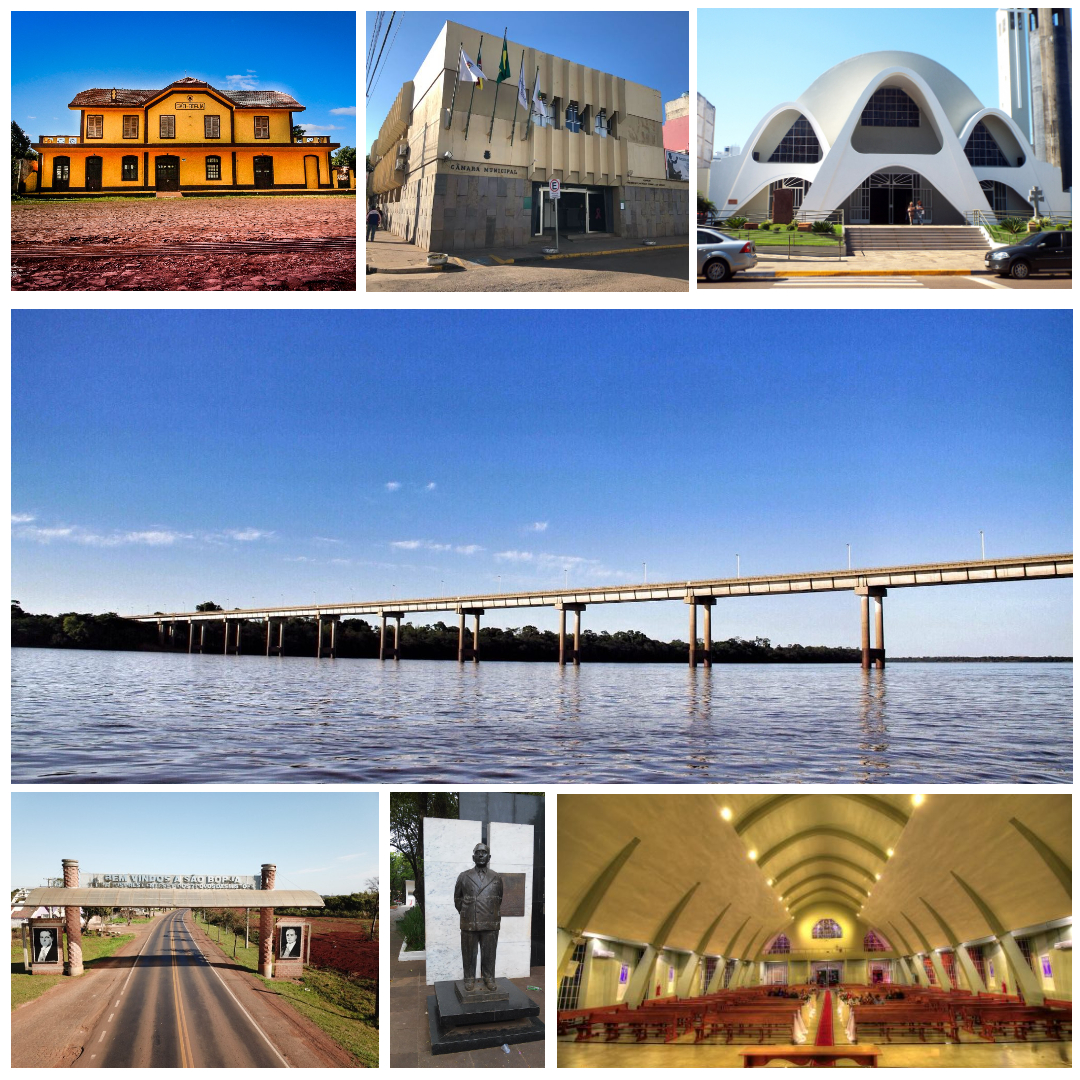
- From top to bottom, from left to right: Old Railway Station; City Hall; São Francisco de Borja Church; Brazil-Argentina Integration Bridge; City Entrance Arch; Statue of Getúlio Vargas; Interior of the Main Church

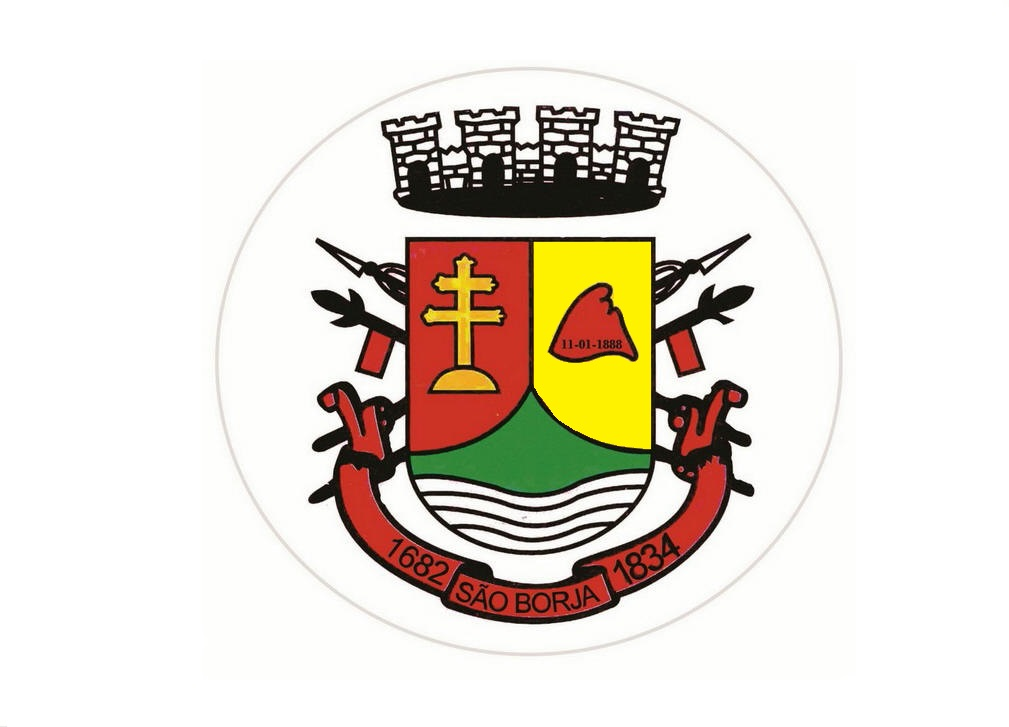
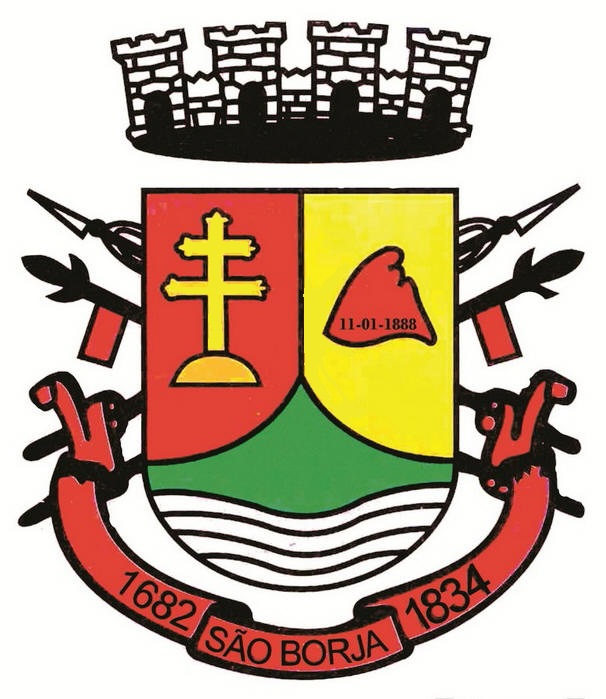
- Flag Coat of arms
- Motto: Terra dos Presidentes

- Location in Brazil
- Coordinates: 28°39′36.84″S 56°00′13.82″W
- Country: Brazil
- Region: South
- State: Rio Grande do Sul
- Founded: March 11, 1833
- Named for: Francis Borgia

Area
  - Total: 3,616.6 km^{2} (1,396.4 sq mi)
- Elevation: 123 m (404 ft)

Population (2020)
  - Total: 60,019
  - Density: 17.05/km^{2} (44.2/sq mi)
- Time zone: UTC−3 (BRT)
- Postal code: 97670-000
- HDI (2010): 0.736 – high
- Website: www.saoborja.rs.gov.br

São Borja is a city in the Brazilian state of Rio Grande do Sul. São Borja is the oldest municipality in the Brazilian state of Rio Grande do Sul and was founded in 1682 by the Jesuits as the first of the Seven Places of the Missions, and named São Francisco de Borja, in honor of Saint Francis Borgia.

== Proximity with Argentina ==
It is situated on the Western Frontier of Rio Grande do Sul on the border with Argentina which is defined by the Uruguay River (Portuguese spelling of the river: Uruguai).

Served also by São Borja Airport, the city is linked to the Argentine city of Santo Tomé through the Integration Bridge.

== Presidential heritage ==
São Borja is known as the Land of the Presidents as is the birthplace of two Brazilian Presidents: Getúlio Vargas (1882–1954) and João Goulart (1919–1976).

== Climate ==
Climate data for São Borja (1976–2005)
Month	Jan	Feb	Mar	Apr	May	Jun	Jul	Aug	Sep	Oct	Nov	Dec	Year
Record high °C (°F)	37.5 (99.5)	36.4 (97.5)	35.2 (95.4)	33.2 (91.8)	30.0 (86.0)	28.6 (83.5)	29.2 (84.6)	31.3 (88.3)	32.6 (90.7)	34.2 (93.6)	35.5 (95.9)	36.5 (97.7)	37.5 (99.5)
Mean daily maximum °C (°F)	32.3 (90.1)	31.3 (88.3)	29.8 (85.6)	26.4 (79.5)	23.1 (73.6)	20.7 (69.3)	20.7 (69.3)	22.2 (72.0)	23.4 (74.1)	26.5 (79.7)	28.8 (83.8)	31.2 (88.2)	26.4 (79.5)
Daily mean °C (°F)	26.3 (79.3)	25.5 (77.9)	24.1 (75.4)	20.9 (69.6)	17.7 (63.9)	15.6 (60.1)	15.5 (59.9)	16.6 (61.9)	17.9 (64.2)	20.8 (69.4)	22.7 (72.9)	25.1 (77.2)	20.7 (69.3)
Mean daily minimum °C (°F)	20.2 (68.4)	19.7 (67.5)	18.3 (64.9)	15.5 (59.9)	12.3 (54.1)	10.6 (51.1)	10.3 (50.5)	11.0 (51.8)	12.4 (54.3)	15.0 (59.0)	16.6 (61.9)	19.0 (66.2)	15.1 (59.1)
Record low °C (°F)	14.0 (57.2)	13.8 (56.8)	11.9 (53.4)	7.6 (45.7)	4.1 (39.4)	1.6 (34.9)	1.5 (34.7)	2.3 (36.1)	4.1 (39.4)	7.5 (45.5)	9.7 (49.5)	13.0 (55.4)	1.5 (34.7)
Average precipitation mm (inches)	130.5 (5.14)	131.6 (5.18)	159.2 (6.27)	203.1 (8.00)	132.1 (5.20)	109.3 (4.30)	92.2 (3.63)	79.2 (3.12)	127.3 (5.01)	177.2 (6.98)	148.8 (5.86)	137.8 (5.43)	1,628.3 (64.12)
Average relative humidity (%)	70	74	75	78	79	81	79	76	75	73	70	68	75
Mean monthly sunshine hours	283	240	238	197	190	157	176	181	188	236	263	287	2,636
Source: Empresa Brasileira de Pesquisa Agropecuária (EMBRAPA)

== See also ==
- Geography of Rio Grande do Sul
- Saint Francis Borgia
- List of municipalities in Rio Grande do Sul
