= Brazil–Peru border =

International border

Coordinates: 10°57′0″S 69°34′12″W

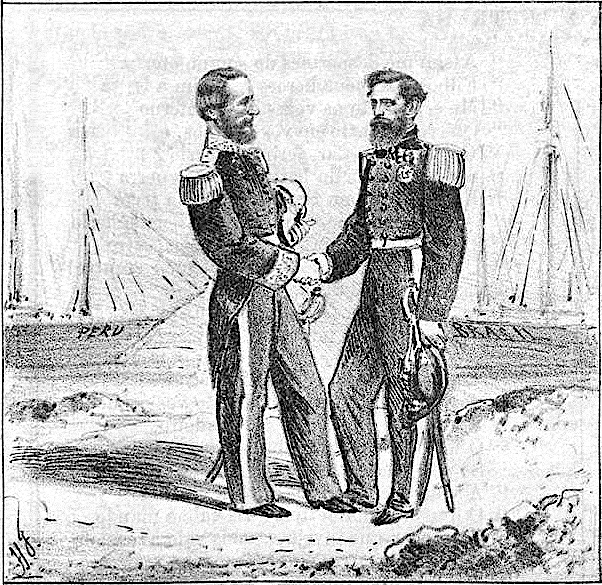
- Border commission of Brazil and Peru: Peruvian captain Francisco Carrasco and Brazilian Navy captain lieutenant José da Costa Azevedo. Published on the Brazilian magazine Semana Ilustrada, nº 291, 1866.

Characteristics
- Entities: Brazil; Peru
- Length: 2,995 kilometres (1,861 mi)

History
- Current shape: 1909
- Treaties: Velarde-Río Branco Treaty

The Brazil–Peru border is the line, located in the Amazon rainforest, that limits the territories of Brazil and Peru. The Brazilian states of Amazonas and Acre border the eastern Peruvian regions of Loreto, Ucayali and Madre de Dios. Part of the limit was established in the Treaty of Rio de Janeiro in 1909.

== Brazil and Peru relations ==
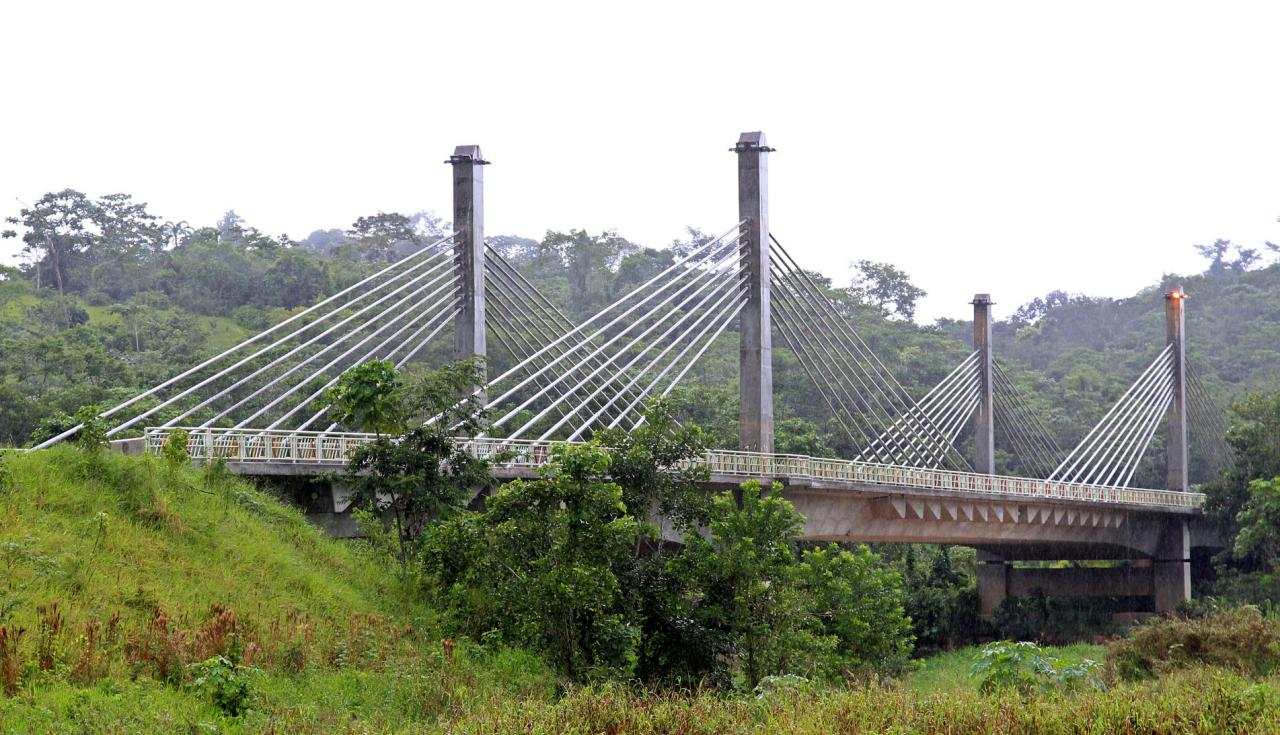
Brazil-Peru Integration Bridge cross the Acre River, connecting the Brazilian city of Assis Brasil to Iñapari, in the Peruvian side of the border.

In 2013, the tenth anniversary of the Strategic Alliance between Brazil and Peru was celebrated. On the occasion of that anniversary, President Dilma Rousseff made an official visit to Peru on November 11. Among the main objectives of the Brazil-Peru strategic alliance are integration in infrastructure, cooperation (mainly in social and security issues), border integration and economic-trade integration.

In the field of physical integration, once the Interoceanic Highway, which connects the State of Acre with the Pacific and inaugurated in 2011, the two countries started to study a Bioceanic Railroad project, object of a Brazil-Peru-China Memorandum of Understanding signed In May 2015. These projects are strategic for the integration of the economies of the North and the Midwest of Brazil to Peru and the Pacific.

== Border towns ==
- Assis Brasil, Acre (Brazil)
- Iñapari (Peru)
