= Rio Acre Ecological Station =

- Estação Ecológica do Rio Acre
- IUCN category Ia (strict nature reserve)
- Location within Brazil
- Nearest city: Assis Brasil, Acre
- Coordinates: 10°54′50″S 70°17′02″W
- Area: 77,500 hectares (192,000 acres)
- Designation: Ecological station
- Created: 2 June 1981

Rio Acre Ecological Station (Portuguese: Estação Ecológica do Rio Acre) is an ecological station in the state of Acre, Brazil.

== Location ==
Conservation units in Acre. 6: Rio Acre Ecological Station

The Rio Acre Ecological Station, which covers 79,094 hectares (195,450 acres), was created on 2 June 1981. It is administered by the Chico Mendes Institute for Biodiversity Conservation. The ecological station lies in the municipalities of Assis Brasil and Sena Madureira in the state of Acre. It contains Amazon forest bounded to the north by an Indian reservation and to the south by the Acre River.

== Environment ==
The vegetation is characterized by open forests of palms and bamboos. 255 species of birds have been found in the alluvial forests, and 189 species in the open forests. The first occurrence in Brazil of several species of birds was first recorded in the ecological station, including sapphire-spangled emerald (Amazilia lactea), Guianan warbling antbird (Hypocnemis cantator), buff-fronted foliage-gleaner (Philydor rufum), wedge-billed woodcreeper (Glyphorynchus spirurus), Tschudi's woodcreeper (Xiphorhynchus ocellatus chunchotambo) and russet-backed oropendola (Psarocolius angustifrons).

The station is rich in species of amphibian, including about 40% of all the species recorded in the state of Acre. The yellow-spotted river turtle is found in small numbers, but is subject to increasing pressure from people hunting the eggs. 44 species of terrestrial mammals have been recorded, including the threatened giant armadillo (Priodontes maximus), giant anteater (Myrmecophaga tridactyla), Peruvian spider monkey (Ateles chamek), Goeldi's marmoset (Callimico goeldii), South American tapir (Tapirus terrestris), neotropical otter (Lontra longicaudis), margay (Leopardus wiedii), jaguar (Panthera onca) and cougar (Puma concolor).

== Conservation ==
The Ecological Station is a "strict nature reserve" under IUCN protected area category Ia. It was created to preserve the headwaters of the Acre River and to promote research. The conservation unit is supported by the Amazon Region Protected Areas Program.

== Sources ==
- "Estação Ecológica Rio Acre", Ambiente Brasil (in Portuguese), 23 June 2010
- Estação Ecológica do Rio Acre (in Portuguese), Chico Mendes Institute for Biodiversity Conservation
- Full list: PAs supported by ARPA, ARPA
- Unidade de Conservação: Estação Ecológica Rio Acre (in Portuguese), MMA: Ministério do Meio Ambiente
