= Tahuamanu province =

Coordinates: 10.954569°S 69.576824°W

Tahuamanu
- Province
- Location of Tahuamanu in Madre de Dios Region
- Country: Peru
- Region: Madre de Dios
- Capital: Iñapari

Government
  - Mayor: Alfonso Bernardo Cardozo Mouzully (2007-10)

Area
  - Total: 21,196.88 km^{2} (8,184.16 sq mi)

Population
  - Total: 7,429
  - Density: 0.3505/km^{2} (0.9077/sq mi)
- UBIGEO: 1703

Tahuamanu is the smallest of three provinces in the Madre de Dios Region of Peru.

== Political division ==
The province is divided into three districts, which are:

- Iberia
- Iñapari
- Tahuamanu
