= Transoceánica (bus route) =

Overland travel service

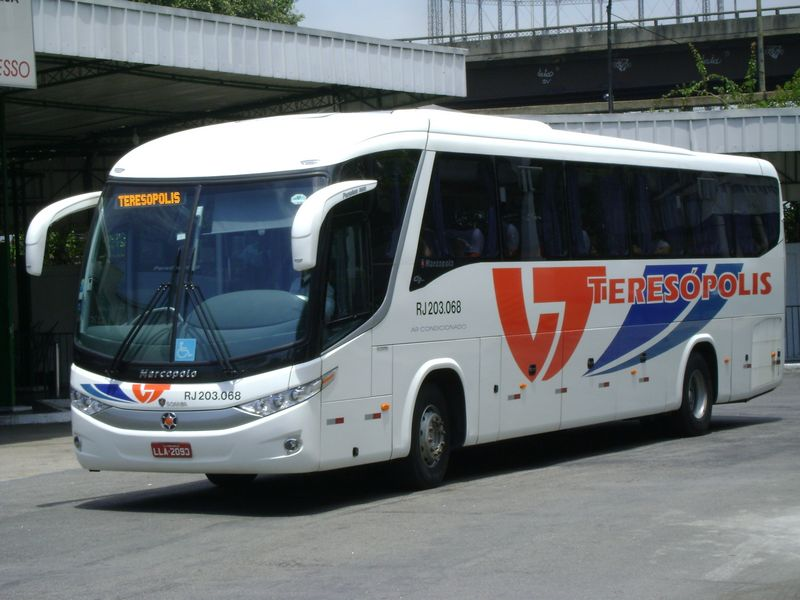
- The journey is undertaken on a Marcopolo Viaggio G7 1050

Overview
- Operator: Viação Trans Acreana
- Status: Active
- Began service: 2016 (10 years ago)

Route
- Start: Rio de Janeiro, Brazil
- End: Lima, Peru

Service
- Journey time: 5+ days

The Transoceánica is a weekly long-distance international bus route which operates between Rio de Janeiro, Brazil, and Lima, Peru, partly via the Interoceanic Highway. At 3,920 miles (6,310 km), it is the world's longest active bus route. It traverses the Andes and Peruvian Amazonia.

== Operator ==
The route has been operated since 2023 by Brazilian bus operator Viação Trans Acreana. The service was operated between 2016 and 2020 by Peruvian company Expresso Internacional Ormeño, which went out of business during the COVID-19 pandemic.

== Route ==
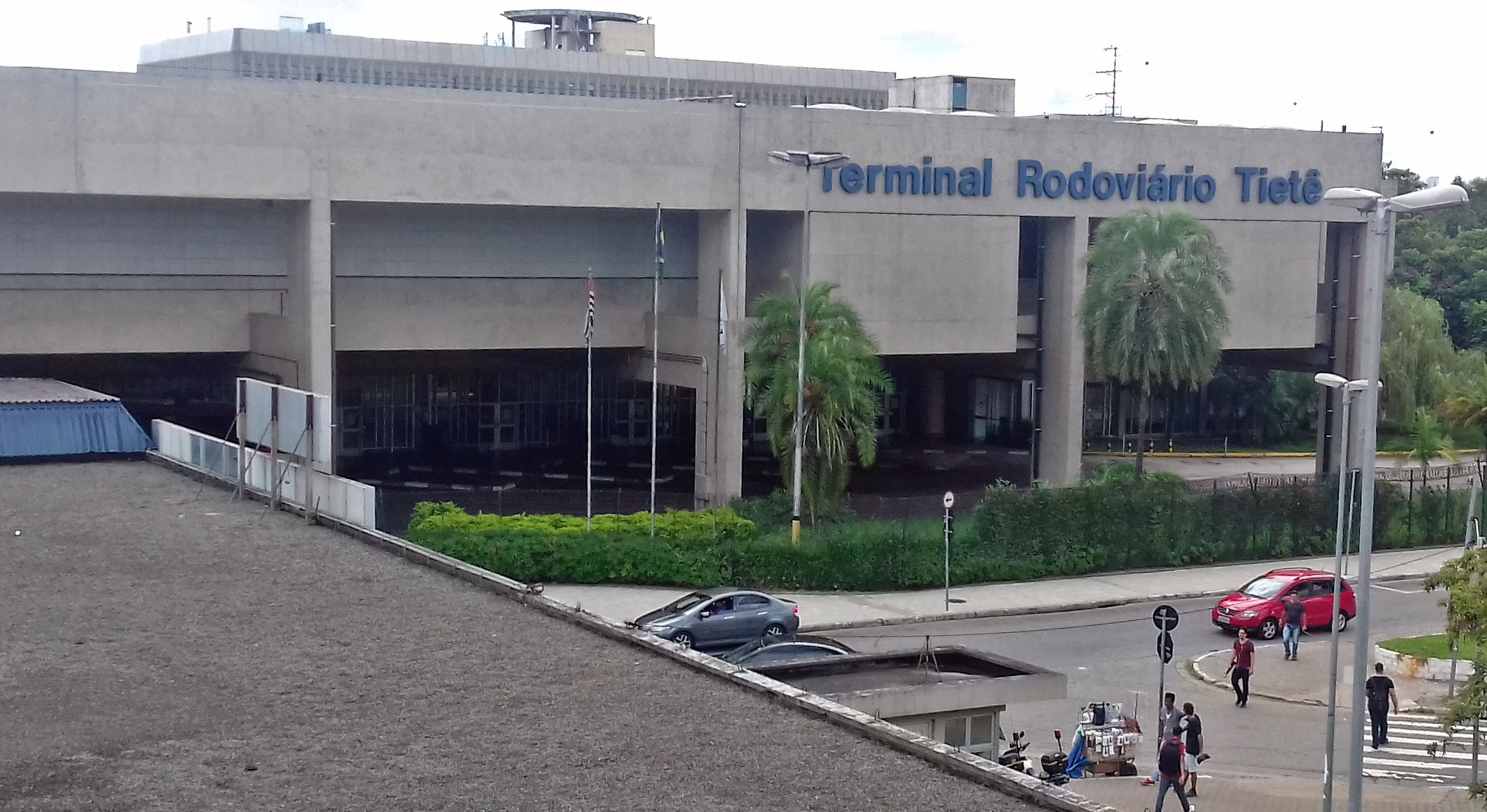
Tietê Bus Terminal in São Paulo

Beginning at Rio de Janeiro's Novo Rio Bus Terminal, the route passes through São Paulo (via the Tietê Bus Terminal) and the Brazilian states of Mato Grosso do Sul, Mato Grosso, Rondônia and Acre (where Viação Trans Acreana is based), before crossing into Peru. It then continues through the Peruvian Amazonia and begins to follow the Interoceanic Highway to Atocongo metro station in Lima. The bus stops three times each day to allow its passengers to eat and exercise.

== Bus configuration ==
Trans Acreana utilises a Marcopolo Viaggio G7 1050 for the route. It has 44 regular seats and 12 which double as sleeping berths. It has a toilet, sink and a water fountain. There is no onboard shower.

== Crew ==
Two drivers take alternate shifts operating the bus.
