= Bolpebra =

Coordinates: 10°56′51.64″S 69°33′50.79″W

Map showing tri-border towns Iñapari (Peru), Assis Brasil and Bolpebra (Bolivia)

Bolpebra is a small Bolivian town on the border tripoint with Peru and Brazil, in the Pando Department on the banks of the Acre River. The name of the town is actually a portmanteau of the three countries’ names, Bolivia, Peru and Brazil. The population of Bolpebra is about 2390 inhabitants.

The town is located near the Brazil–Peru Integration Bridge.
