= Tahuamanu District =

Coordinates: 11.4667°S 69.3000°W

Tahuamanu
- District
- Location of Tahuamanu in the Tahuamanu province
- Country: Peru
- Region: Madre de Dios
- Province: Tahuamanu
- Founded: December 26, 1912
- Capital: San Lorenzo

Government
  - Mayor: Santiago Castellanos Laynes

Area
  - Total: 3,793.9 km^{2} (1,464.8 sq mi)
- Elevation: 320 m (1,050 ft)

Population (2005 census)
  - Total: 1,770
  - Density: 0.467/km^{2} (1.21/sq mi)
- Time zone: UTC-5 (PET)
- UBIGEO: 170303

Tahuamanu District is one of three districts of the province Tahuamanu in Peru.
