= San Juan de Marcona Airport =

Airport in Peru

- IATA: SJA; ICAO: SPJN

Summary
- Airport type: Public
- Serves: San Juan de Marcona
- Elevation AMSL: 144 ft / 44 m
- Coordinates: 15°21′10″S 75°08′15″W

Map
- Location of the airport in Peru

Runways
| Direction | Length | | Surface |
| Direction | m | ft | Surface |
|---|---|---|---|
| 15/33 | 2,073 | 6,801 | Asphalt |
- Sources: GCM Google Maps

San Juan de Marcona Airport (ICAO: SPJN) is an airport serving the city of San Juan de Marcona, the capital of the Ica Region of Peru, and the Marcona Naval Base.

The runway is in the desert 2.7 kilometres (1.7 mi) northeast of the town, and has an additional 800 metres (2,600 ft) of overrun on its southeastern end.

The San Juan de Marcona VOR-DME (Ident: SJN) is 7.0 nautical miles (13.0 km) north-northeast of the airport.

== See also ==
- Transport in Peru
- List of airports in Peru
