= Integration Bridge =

International Bridge of Integration
- Coordinates: 28°36′37″S 56°00′54″W
- Crosses: Uruguay River
- Locale: Santo Tomé, Corrientes, Argentina. São Borja, Rio Grande do Sul, Brazil
- Followed by: Paso de los Libres – Uruguaiana International Bridge

Characteristics
- Design: Cantilever bridge
- Total length: 1,403 metres (4,603 ft)
- Width: 8.30 metres (27.2 ft)
- Longest span: 140 metres (460 ft)

History
- Opened: December 9, 1997

The International Bridge of Integration, also known as International Bridge São Borja - St. Thomas, is a bridge across the Uruguay River, which connects the cities of São Borja in Brazil and Santo Tomé in Argentina.

== See also ==
- List of international bridges
