= Brazil–Peru Integration Bridge =

International border bridge between Brazil and Peru

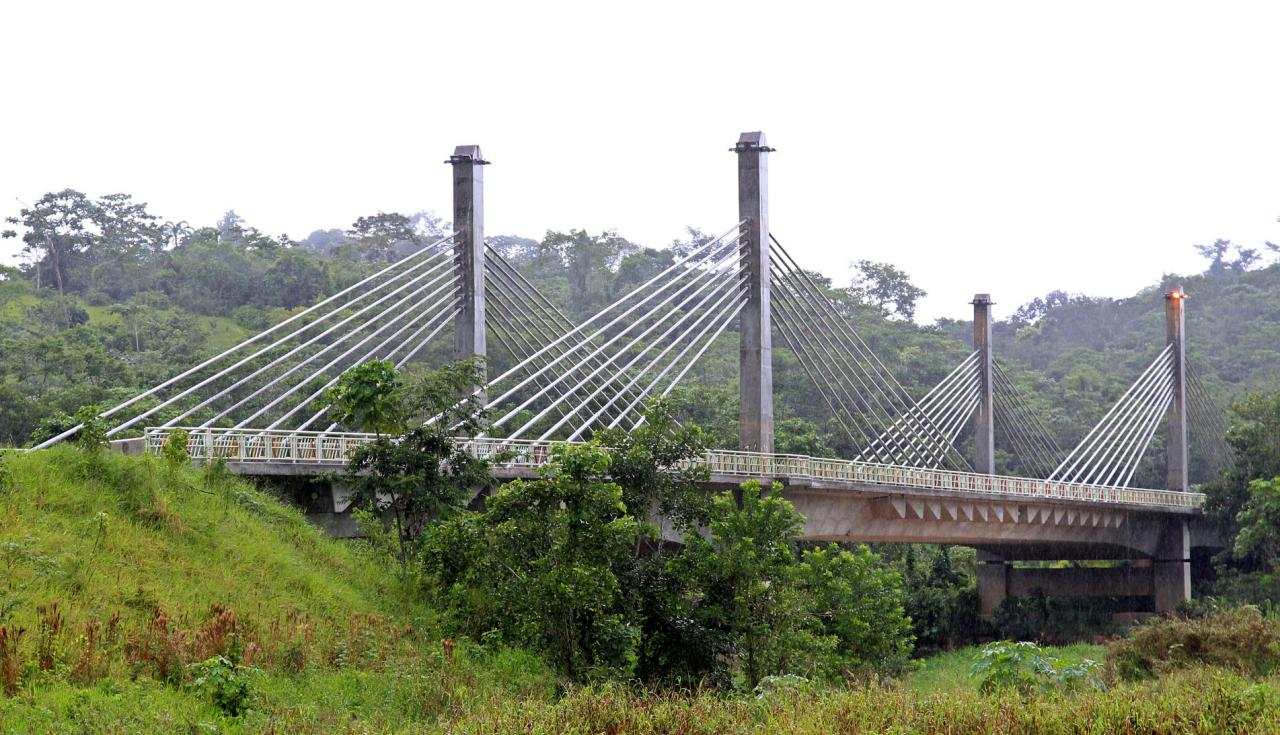
- Coordinates: 10°56′29″S 69°34′37″W
- Crosses: Acre River
- Locale: Border between Peru and Brazil near Iñapari

Characteristics
- Total length: 240 metres (790 ft)
- Longest span: 110 metres (360 ft)

History
- Opened: 2006

Location
- Interactive map of Brazil–Peru Integration Bridge

The Brazil–Peru Integration Bridge (Portuguese: Ponte da Integração Brasil–Peru, Spanish: Puente de la Integración Brasil-Perú) is a bridge that crosses the Acre River at a point which forms the international border between Peru and Brazil. The bridge is part of highway BR-317, and connects the Peruvian city Iñapari to the Brazilian city Assis Brasil. The bridge is very close to the Bolivian city Bolpebra.

During the COVID-19 Pandemic, the bridge was closed by Peruvian authorities due to Peru closing its terrestrial border crossings to limit the spread of the virus. On 26 September 2021, residents of Assis Brasil and Iñapari protested on the bridge and demanded its reopening citing economic struggles following its closure.

== See also ==
- Brazil–Peru border
- Brazil–Peru relations

Map showing the Brazil-Peru Integration Bridge crossing Acre River at the international border between Peru and Brazil, near the border with Bolivia

== Gallery ==
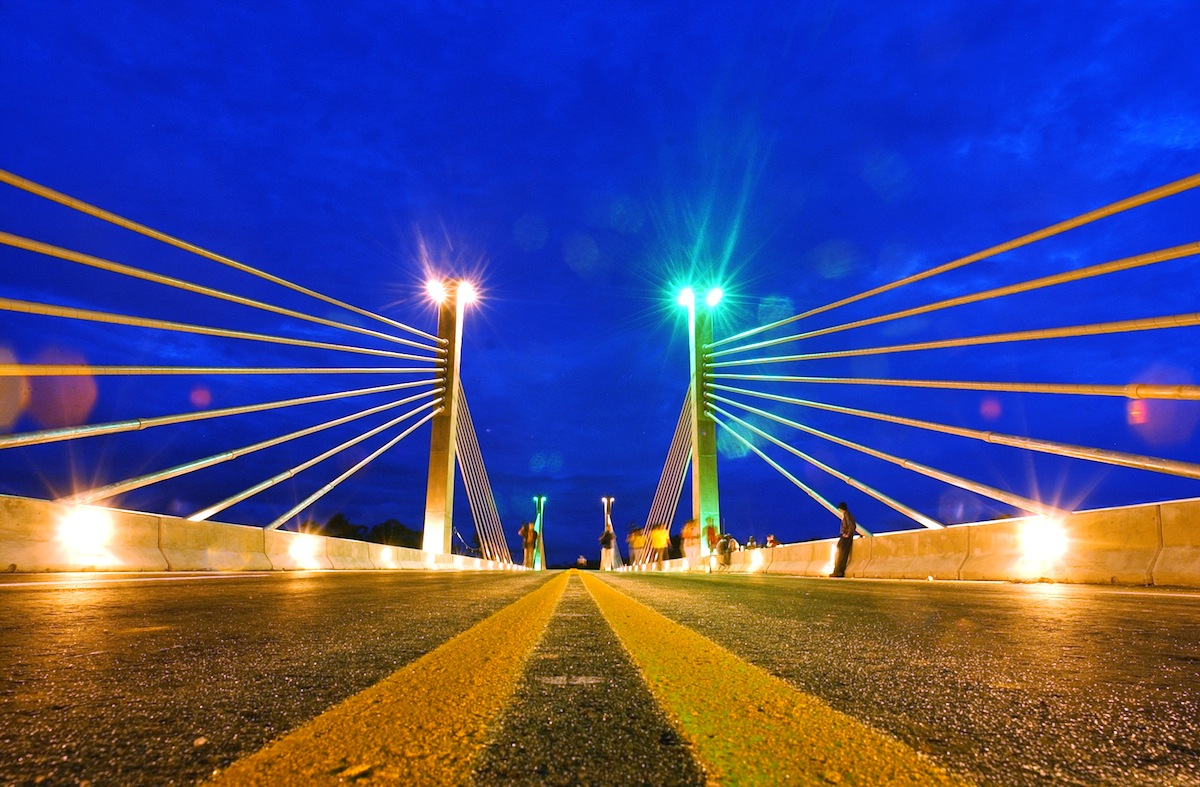

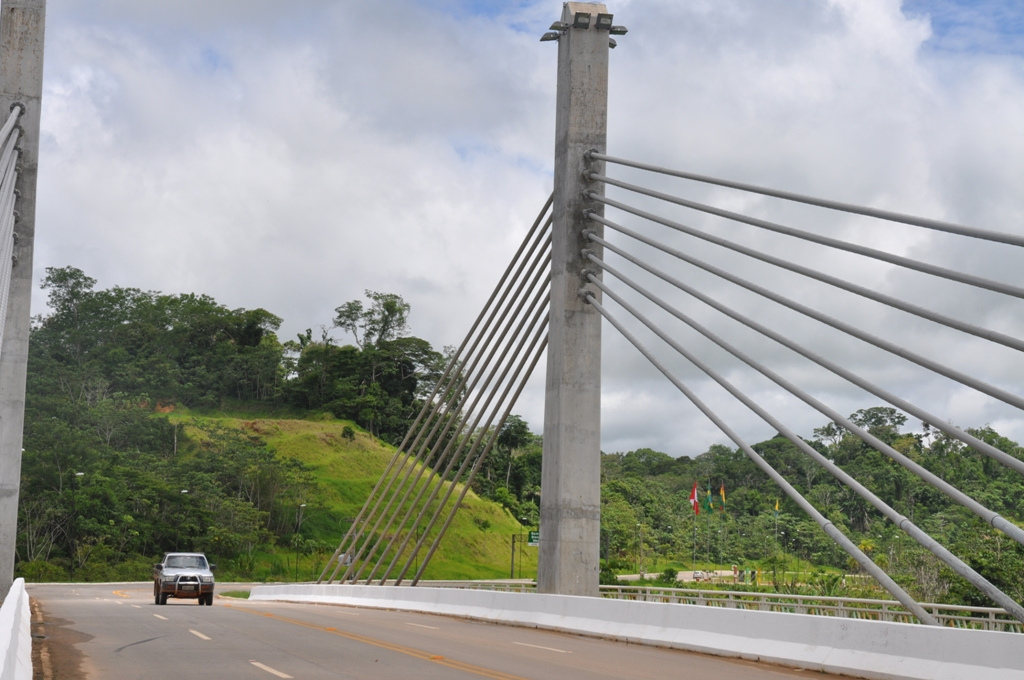

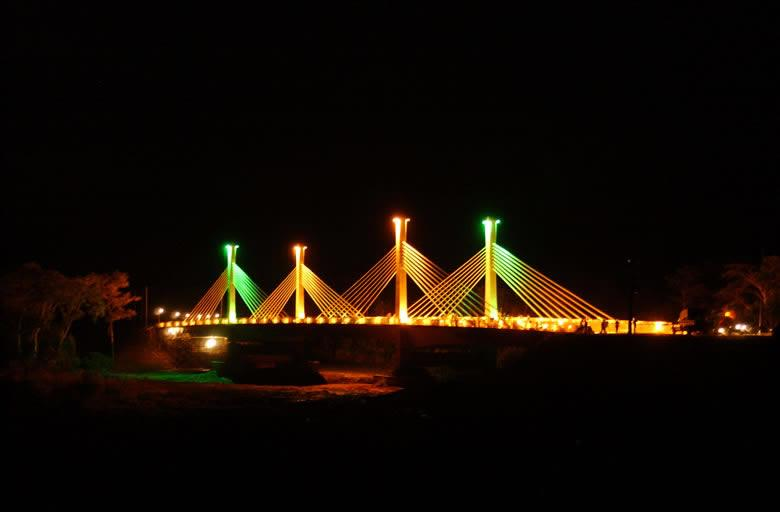
