= Marcona District =

Coordinates: 15.3617°S 75.1666°W

Marcona
- District
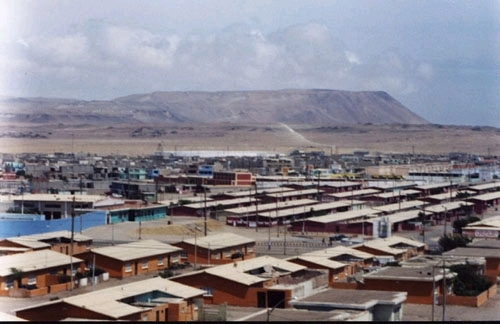

- Coat of arms
- Interactive map of Marcona
- Country: Peru
- Region: Ica
- Province: Nazca
- Founded: May 10, 1955
- Capital: San Juan

Government
  - Mayor: Joel Roberto Rosales Pacheco

Area
  - Total: 1,955.36 km^{2} (754.97 sq mi)
- Elevation: 65 m (213 ft)

Population (2005 census)
  - Total: 11,570
  - Density: 5.917/km^{2} (15.33/sq mi)
- Time zone: UTC-5 (PET)
- UBIGEO: 110304
- Website: munimarcona.gob.pe

Marcona District is one of five districts of the province Nazca in Peru. The district capital is San Juan de Marcona a port on the Pacific coast.

== Marcona Mine ==
The major industry in the Marcona District is the Marcona Mine, an open-pit iron mine. The mine was acquired in 1992 by Shougang Corporation a state owned Chinese corporation which does business locally as Shougang Hierro Peru.

== Economy and history ==
In addition to mining, there is trade and commercial fishing.

In 1870, the Italian-born Peruvian geographer Antonio Raimnondi found the iron ore reserves. The first explorations of the zone in terms of ores and minerals were started in 1915.

Marcona District is the only area in Peru that mines iron ore and produces iron. The capital of the district San Juan de Marcona is located in Ica Region, Nazca Province. The exploitations of iron ore begun in 1953 in the bay of San Juan, in parts by the United States company Marcona Mining Company.
