= Paso de los Libres–Uruguaiana International Bridge =

Bridge between Rio Grande do Sul, Brazil and Argentina

Paso de los Libres – Uruguaiana International Bridge
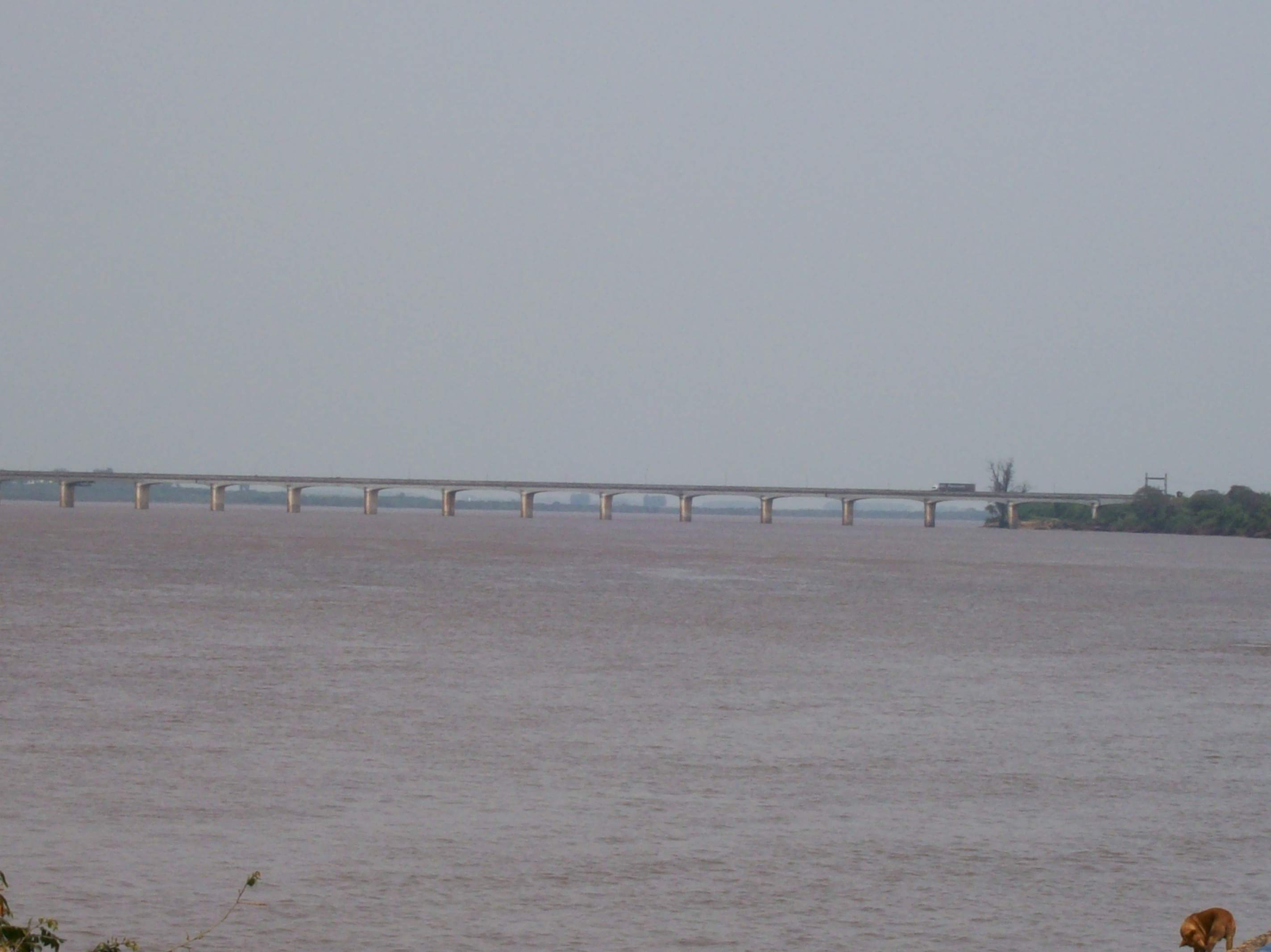
- Coordinates: 29°44′35″S 57°05′35″W
- Crosses: Uruguay River
- Locale: Paso de los Libres, Corrientes, Argentina. Uruguaiana, Rio Grande do Sul, Brazil.
- Official name: Agustín P. Justo - Getúlio Vargas International Bridge
- Preceded by: Integration Bridge
- Followed by: Salto Grande Bridge

Characteristics
- Design: Cantilever bridge
- Total length: 1,419 metres (4,656 ft)

History
- Construction start: 1942
- Opened: October 15, 1945

Location
- Interactive map of Paso de los Libres – Uruguaiana International Bridge

The Paso de los Libres–Uruguaiana International Bridge is a combined road and railroad bridge that joins Argentina and Brazil across the Uruguay River, running between Paso de los Libres, Corrientes Province, Argentina, and Uruguaiana, Rio Grande do Sul, Brazil. It measures 1,419 metres (4,656 ft) in length.

Construction started in 1943 and the bridge was open for transit in 1945, though the 1945 Brazilian coup d'état made the official inauguration happen in 1947.

== See also ==
- List of international bridges
