= Mandioré Lake =

Lake in Bolivia and Brazil

Laguna Mandioré
- Location within Bolivia Location within Brazil Location within South America
- Interactive map of Laguna Mandioré
- Location: Santa Cruz Department, Bolivia / Mato Grosso, Brazil
- Coordinates: 18°08′S 57°33′W
- Primary inflows: río Paraguay
- Primary outflows: río Paraguay
- Basin countries: Bolivia, Brazil
- Surface area: 152 km^{2} (59 sq mi)
- Surface elevation: 90 m (300 ft)
- Islands: 3

Laguna Mandioré is a lake on the border of Brazil and Bolivia and west of sierra Dourados and Paraguay River. It is at an elevation of 90 metres (300 ft), its surface area is 152 square kilometres (59 sq mi).
