= ProInversión =

Peru Investment Promotion Agency
- Agencia de Promoción de la Inversión Privada; ProInversión

Agency overview
- Formed: 2004 (22 years ago)
- Jurisdiction: Government of Peru
- Headquarters: San Isidro, Lima, Peru
- Agency executive: Luis Natal del Carpio Castro, Executive Director
- Parent department: Ministry of Economy and Finance (Peru)
- Website: www.investinperu.pe

The Peru Investment Promotion Agency (Spanish: Agencia de Promoción de la Inversión Privada, also known as ProInversión) is a specialized government agency of Peru, attached to the Ministry of Economy and Finance (Peru). It is responsible for promoting private investment in public infrastructure and public services through public-private partnerships, asset projects and other investment mechanisms.

== History ==
=== Origins ===
The agency's institutional predecessors date back to 1976, when the government of Francisco Morales Bermúdez established the National Commission for Foreign Investments and Technologies (CONITE) through Decree-Law No. 21501. The commission was responsible for matters concerning foreign investment and technology policy.

In 1991, during the government of Alberto Fujimori, the Commission for the Promotion of Private Investment (COPRI) was established to oversee the privatization of state-owned enterprises and promote private-sector participation in the economy.

=== Establishment ===
On 24 April 2002, during the presidency of Alejandro Toledo, Supreme Decree No. 027-2002-PCM ordered the merger of COPRI, CONITE and the Economic Promotion Office of PROMPERÚ into the Executive Directorate of the Fund for the Promotion of Private Investment (FOPRI). The resulting institution became the Investment Promotion Agency (PROINVERSIÓN).

On 4 July 2003, Supreme Decree No. 095-2003-EF changed its official name to the Private Investment Promotion Agency (PROINVERSIÓN) and amended its organizational regulations.

== Functions ==
ProInversión promotes private participation in infrastructure and public services through several investment mechanisms:

- Public-private partnerships (PPPs): Long-term contractual arrangements between the government and private investors for infrastructure and public service projects.
- Asset projects: Private investment initiatives involving the use or development of publicly owned assets.
- Works for Taxes (Obras por Impuestos): A mechanism allowing private companies to finance and execute public investment projects in exchange for tax credits.

The agency also structures investment projects, organizes investor selection processes and provides technical assistance to national, regional and local governments.

== Projects ==
ProInversión is involved in promoting infrastructure projects across several sectors, including transportation, energy, telecommunications, water and sanitation, healthcare and tourism.

Major projects promoted through private investment mechanisms include:

- Lima Metro – urban railway infrastructure.
- Jorge Chávez International Airport – airport concession and expansion.
- Peripheral Ring Road (Lima) – road infrastructure project.
- Huancayo–Huancavelica railway – railway modernization project.
- San Juan de Marcona Port – port infrastructure development.

=== Investment portfolio ===
In October 2026, ProInversión presented an investment portfolio for 2026–2030 comprising 87 projects with an estimated value of more than US$50 billion. The portfolio includes initiatives in transportation, energy, irrigation, mining, tourism, education and sanitation.

The proposed projects include the Chinecas irrigation project, the Integrated Gas Transportation System (SITGAS), the expansion of Lima Metro Line 1 and the Lambayeque Industrial Park.

== Recent developments ==
In 2026, the agency reported increased activity under the Works for Taxes mechanism. By September, projects worth 9.409 billion Peruvian soles had been awarded through this system, covering 691 interventions.

In August 2026, ProInversión received responsibilities related to the management of the Central Railway concession, including work associated with the proposed Lima–Chosica passenger rail service.

== See also ==
- Economy of Peru
- Foreign direct investment
- Privatization
- Public-private partnership
- Infrastructure of Peru
- Works for Taxes
