= Inambari District =

Coordinates: 13.0736°S 70.3844°W

Inambari
- District
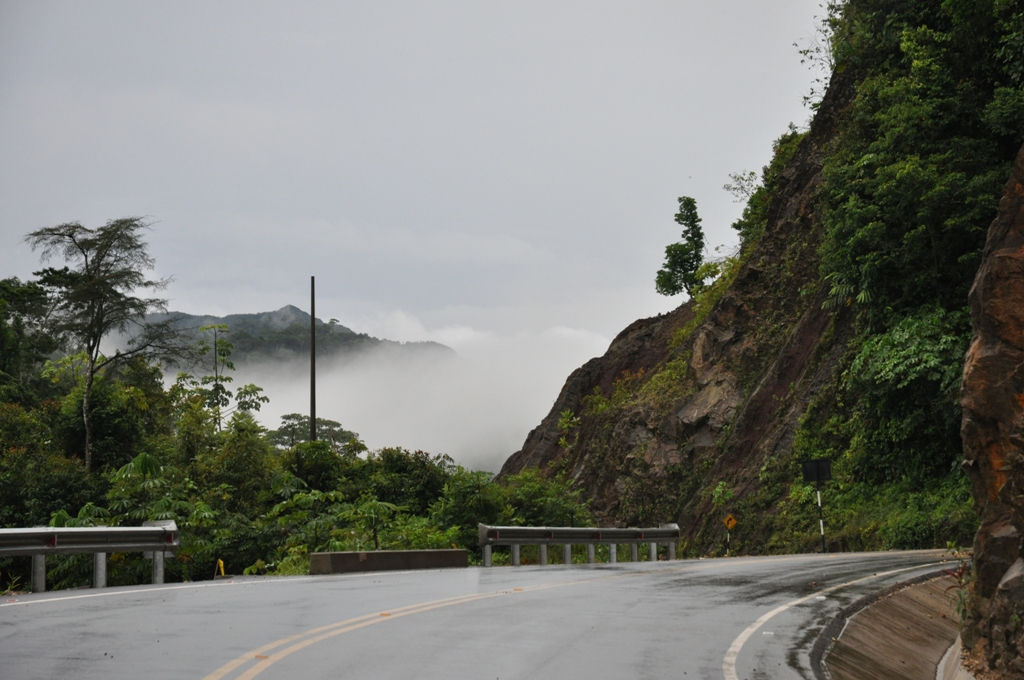

- Location of Inambari in the Tambopata province
- Country: Peru
- Region: Madre de Dios
- Province: Tambopata
- Founded: December 26, 1912
- Capital: Mazuko

Government
  - Mayor: Inocencio Aguilar Roca

Area
  - Total: 4,256.82 km^{2} (1,643.57 sq mi)
- Elevation: 360 m (1,180 ft)

Population (2005 census)
  - Total: 4,888
  - Density: 1.148/km^{2} (2.974/sq mi)
- Time zone: UTC-5 (PET)
- UBIGEO: 170102

Inambari District is one of four districts of the province Tambopata in Peru.
