= San Juan de Marcona =

Coordinates: 15°21′55″S 75°9′45″W

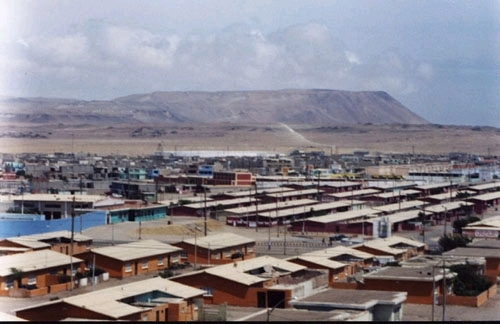
San Juan de Marcona

San Juan de Marcona is the capital of the Marcona District of Nazca Province, Ica Region, Peru. It is a mining, commercial, port, and fishing town, with a population of approximately 20,000 inhabitants. Known as the iron capital and cradle of the Humboldt penguin on the Peruvian coast.

== History ==
Marcona began to become relevant after the mid-nineteen hundreds (1952) when iron was first excavated from the mineral deposits and construction of the San Juan pier by the United States mining company Marcona Mining Company was completed. However, it is important to mention that archaeological remains in the areas of San Nicolás and San Fernando, have been found which suggests the presence of the ancient Peruvians by these desert areas.

There also occurred numerous marine accidents in Marcona, starting with the wreck of the BAP Rimac (1855). More than five hundred people perished while only about 20 managed to survive, including the Peruvian writer Ricardo Palma. Thirty years later a brigantine "Italia" was lost in that area at the beginning of the 20th century.

In 1870, the wise Italian Antonio Raimondi published the existence of an iron deposit in the plains of Marcona. Years later, in 1915, the first explorations of the zone were carried out under the guidance of a local Justo Pastor. He guided the group of engineers toward the plains where the iron was supposed to exist. In 1925 the government president Augusto B. Leguía declared the Marcona National Reserve in order to allow future exploitation.

During the first decades of the 20th century various fishermen from Pisco and Callao arrived in Marcona attracted by the abundance of fish and seafood that was found in the San Nicolás and San Juan bays. These men gave rise to the small fishing coves that exist today.

In 1943 the Peruvian state created the Corporación Peruana del Santa in order to exploit the carbon and iron reserves. This established an iron and steel works in Chimbote, Peru. Subsequently, already having proved the huge reserves of iron in Marcona, a group of American companies (including from Utah) formed the North American mining Marcona Mining Company, giving rise to the formation of the small mining camp around the port of San Juan.

== Pacific Ocean terminal of the Interoceanic Highway ==
Marcona is the northernmost of the 3 ports that comprise the Peruvian termini of the Interoceanic Highway which is being constructed to link the state of Acre, in the Amazon Basin in Brazil, across the Andes to the Pacific Ocean.

The town is also served by the San Juan de Marcona Airport.

== Marcona Mine ==
The major industry in the Marcona District is the Marcona Mine and open-pit iron mine acquired in 1992 by Shougang Corporation a state owned Chinese corporation which does business locally as Shougang Hiero Peru.
