= David Edward Reichle =

American ecologist (born 1938)

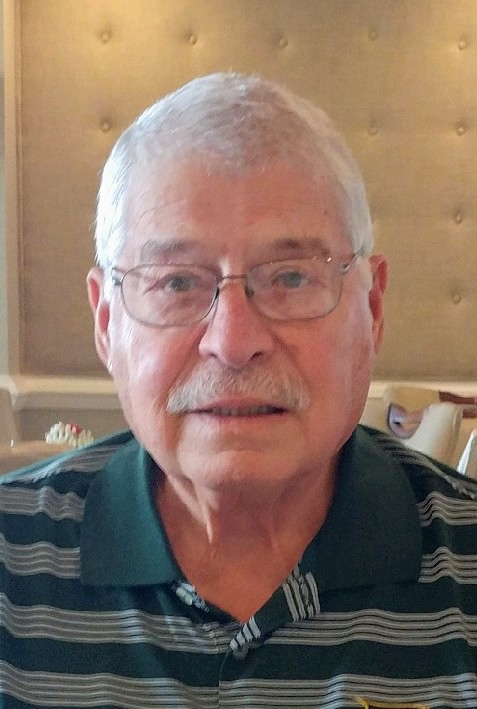
- Reichle in 2021
- Born: October 19, 1938 (age 87)
- Education: Northwestern Univ. (M.S., Ph.D.) Muskingum University (B.S.)
- Known for: Pioneering research on the movement of radionuclides in the environment and the carbon metabolism of forest ecosystems
- Spouse: Donna Rae Haubrich (m. 1961)
- Children: 3
- Awards: Danforth Fellow, Fellow AAAS, IUFRO Sci, Achievement Award, Dist. Ser. Awd., US Dept. of Energy, Muskingum Univ. Distinguished Alumni Award
- Scientific career
- Fields: Radioecology, ecology, forest ecosystems, global carbon cycle
- Workplaces: Oak Ridge National Laboratory, University of Tennessee

David Edward Reichle (born October 19, 1938) is an American ecologist who worked at the Oak Ridge National Laboratory (ORNL). He is known for his pioneering research on the movement of radionuclides in the environment and the carbon metabolism of forest ecosystems. From 1967 to 1981 he was co-chair of Woodlands for the International Biological Programme. He served as Director of ORNL’s Environmental Sciences Division (1986-1990) and retired in 2000 as Associate Laboratory Director for Life and Environmental Sciences.

== Biography ==
Reichle was born on October 19, 1938, to Elsie and Edward J. Reichle in Cincinnati, Ohio. He graduated from Muskingum University with a B.S. in biology and chemistry in 1960. He attended Northwestern University on a Danforth Foundation Fellowship, where he received M.S. and Ph.D. degrees in biological sciences in 1961 and 1964. He was a lecturer in ecology (1964) at the Chicago Academy of Sciences. A U.S. Atomic Energy Commission postdoctoral fellowship led him to work at the Oak Ridge National Laboratory.

Reichle joined Oak Ridge National Laboratory (ORNL) in Tennessee as an Atomic Energy Commission Postdoctoral Fellow in 1964 and worked in the Radiation Ecology Section of the Health Physics Division as a biophysicist in 1966. In 1970 he became Program Manager for Ecosystems Studies. During the early 1980s, he managed the Global Carbon Cycle Research Program for the Department of Energy (DOE) which was the lead US federal agency for research on atmospheric carbon dioxide. He then became Director of ORNL’s Environmental Sciences Division (1986–1990). He was appointed ORNL Associate Director for Life and Environmental Sciences (1990-2000) and Vice-President of Lockheed Martin Energy Systems. He was an adjunct professor of ecology at The University of Tennessee from 1969 until his retirement in 2000.

Reichle has been married to Donna Rae Haubrich since 1961. They have three children.

== Work ==
=== Ecosystem research ===
Reichle’s early research focused on the pathways of movement of radionuclides in the environment, studying invertebrate food chains and mineral cycles in forest ecosystems. One of his primary research sites was the Cesium-137 tagged Liriodendron forest in Oak Ridge, TN. He soon realized that radioisotope transport was influenced by the metabolism of species and ecosystems, and he soon became captivated with understanding the carbon metabolism of ecosystems. He began studying the bioenergetics of forest decomposer and herbivore trophic levels with pioneering analyses of the energetics of natural populations and whole ecosystems. Reichle established ORNL’s internationally renowned ecosystem analysis program in the 1970s. Beginning in the 1980s, he played a major role in the development of Oak Ridge National Laboratory’s climate change research program and the Department of Energy’s research program on the global carbon cycle.

Reichle has authored over 100 scientific publications and several books in the areas of the environmental behavior of radionuclides, forest ecology, and energy fluxes and carbon cycling in ecosystems. His books include: Analysis of Temperate Forest Ecosystems (1970), Productivity of World Ecosystems (1975), Dynamic Properties of Forest Ecosystems (1981), the Changing Carbon Cycle (1986), and The Global Carbon Cycle and Climate Change (2020), The Global Carbon Cycle and Climate Change, 2nd ed. (2023). He was a US delegate to UNESCO meetings on Productivity of Forest Ecosystems in Brussels (1969), Delhi (1971), Lund (1976); the 1999 Symposium on the History of Radioecology in Vienna (1999); and the Greenhouse Gas Technology Conference in Cairns, Australia (2000).

=== Legacy ===
His research team’s seminal publication in 1973 on carbon flow and storage in a forest ecosystem along with H.T. Odum’s Silver Springs (1957) and G. M. Woodwell’s Oak-Pine forest (1970), became a benchmark for productivity and energy flow in ecosystems. Reichle played a prominent role in the International Biological Program, which paved the way for emergence of ecosystem research in the US and was the basis for much of the science and future national programs^{[11]} on carbon cycling and climate change effects. He was a participant in the United Nations Framework Convention on Climate Change’s 1992 Earth Summit in Rio de Janeiro, Brazil. Dr. Reichle’s 2020 book The Global Carbon Cycle and Climate Change^{[2]} is a comprehensive state-of-the-art summary of the global carbon cycle and its relationship to climate change, scaling ecological energetics from the organism to the biosphere.

Reichle represented the U.S. at a joint American/Russian symposium sponsored by the International Institute on Applied Systems Analysis on the History of the Atomic Projects: The 50s Years: Sociopolitical, Environmental, and Engineering Lessons Learned with a review of Radioecological research programs of the Atomic Energy Commission in the 1950s. Reichle has represented the U.S. government as a technical advisor to the 1995 US Trade Mission to South Africa. led by the US Secretary of Energy Hazel O’Leary, and at the 2000 international Greenhouse Gas Technology Conference in Cairns, Australia.

=== Environmental conservation ===
Reichle joined The Nature Conservancy (TNC) in 1961 as a graduate student while at Northwestern University. He served six years on the TNC National Board of Governors (1982-1988), and 12 years as a Trustee and chairman (2004-2006) of The Nature Conservancy of TN. During his leadership, the Conservancy secured protection for 10,000 acres adjoining the Great Smoky Mountains National Park and two designated Wilderness Areas – Citico Creek Wilderness Area and Joyce Kilmer Memorial Forest. During his term as Chairman of the Trustees, the TN Nature Conservancy successfully completed its first state-wide capital campaign. As chairman, he led the Trustees in completing the Walls of Jericho acquisition in the Southern Cumberland Mts., and Pogue Creek and Skinner Mt. in the Northern Cumberland Mts. The TN Nature Conservancy also partnered with the State of Tennessee in a major conservation effort in the Northern Cumberland Mountains, which then TN Gov. Phil Bredesen celebrated in 2007 as the state's largest conservation of land in more than seven decades, with the land along the northern Cumberland Plateau in Anderson, Campbell, Morgan and Scott counties amounting to more than 127,000 acres.

=== Awards and recognition ===
Reichle is a Fellow of the American Association for the Advancement of Science (1968) and received a number of awards including a Danforth Foundation Fellowship (1960), the IUFRO Scientific Achievement Award (1976), U.S. Department of Energy Distinguished Service Award (2000), and the Muskingum University Distinguished Service Award (1996).

== Published works ==
- 1970 Analysis of Temperate Forest Ecosystems, Springer Verlag OCLC 102449
- 1981 Dynamic Properties of Forest Ecosystems, Cambridge Univ. Press, OCLC 1025081165
- 1986 The Changing Carbon Cycle, with J. R. Trabalka, Springer Verlag, doi:10.1007/978-1-4757-1915-4
- 2020 The Global Carbon Cycle and Climate Change, Elsevier, ISBN 978-0-12-820244-9
- 2023 The Global Carbon Cycle and Climate Change, 2nd ed., Elsevier, eBook ISBN 9780443187742

=== Reports, a selection ===
- 1975 Productivity of World Ecosystems, with J. F. Franklin and D. W. Goodall, US National Academy of Sciences, http://nap.edu/20114
- 1997 Technology Opportunities to Reduce Greenhouse Gas Emissions, Ed. with S. R. Bull, National Laboratory Directors, doi:10.2172/885734
- 1999 Carbon Sequestration R&D Plan, Ed., with J. Houghton, B. Kane, and J. Ekmann, Office of Science, US Department of Energy, doi:10.2172/810722

=== Articles, a selection ===
- Reichle, David (May 1968). "Relation of Body Size to Food Intake, Oxygen Consumption, and Trace Element Metabolism in Forest Floor Arthropods". Ecology. 49 (3): 538–542. doi:10.2307/1934119. JSTOR 1934119.
- Reichle, David E. (November 1969). "Measurement of Elemental Assimilation by Animals from Radioisotope Retention Patterns". Ecology. 50 (6): 1102–1104. doi:10.2307/1936907. JSTOR 1936907.
- Reichle, David E.; Dunaway, Paul B.; Nelson, Daniel J. (1970). "Turnover and concentration of radionuclides in food chains". Nuclear Safety. 11 (1): 43–55. OSTI 4758703. NAID 10004030948.
- Reichle, David E.; Dinger, Blaine E.; Edwards, Nelson T.; Harris, WF; Sollins, Phillip (August 1973). "Carbon flow and storage in a forest ecosystem". Brookhaven Symposia in Biology. pp. 345–365. ISBN 978-0-87079-006-5. PMID 4807345.
- Reichle, D. E.; O'Neill, R. V.; Kaye, S. V.; Sollins, P.; Booth, Ray S. (1973). "Systems Analysis as Applied to Modeling Ecological Processes". Oikos. 24 (3): 337–343. doi:10.2307/3543808. JSTOR 3543808.
- Reichle, David E. (April 1975). "Advances in Ecosystem Analysis". BioScience. 25 (4): 257–264. doi:10.2307/1296988. JSTOR 1296988.
- Edwards, N. T., H. H. Shugart, S. B. McLaughlin, W. F. Harris and D. E. Reichle. 1981. Carbon metabolism in terrestrial ecosystems, pp. 499-536. In: Dynamic properties of forest ecosystems, D. E. Reichle (Ed.). Cambridge University Press. OCLC 1025081165
- Trabalka, John R.; Edmonds, James A.; Reilly, John M.; Gardner, Robert H.; Reichle, David E. (1986). "Atmospheric CO2 Projections with Globally Averaged Carbon Cycle Models". The Changing Carbon Cycle. pp. 534–560. doi:10.1007/978-1-4757-1915-4_26. ISBN 978-1-4757-1917-8.
