= Iñapari District =

Coordinates: 10.9450°S 69.5772°W

Iñapari
- District
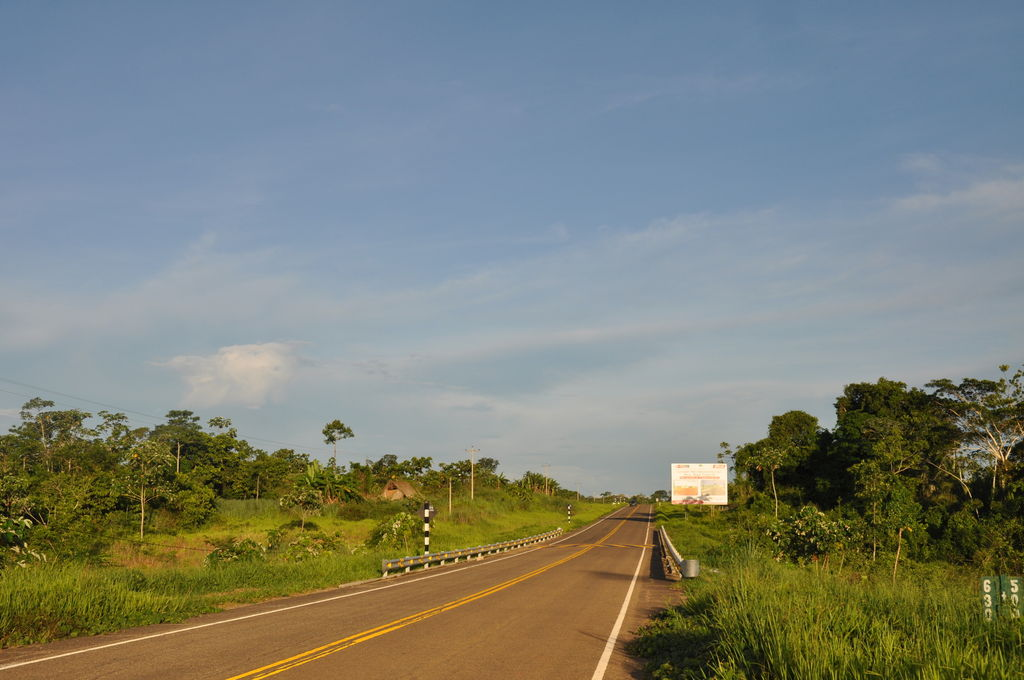

- Location of Iñapari in the Tahuamanu province
- Country: Peru
- Region: Madre de Dios
- Province: Tahuamanu
- Founded: December 26, 1912
- Capital: Iñapari

Government
  - Mayor: Alfonso Bernardo Cardozo Mouzully

Area
  - Total: 14,853.7 km^{2} (5,735.0 sq mi)
- Elevation: 220 m (720 ft)

Population (2005 census)
  - Total: 3,591
  - Density: 0.2418/km^{2} (0.6262/sq mi)
- Time zone: UTC-5 (PET)
- UBIGEO: 170301

Iñapari District is one of three districts of the Province Tahuamanu in Peru. The Acre river marks the border. The 210 km long trip between Iñapari and Puerto Maldonado will last approximately 3 hours by car. This road is totally paved. It is also the Customs, Point-of-Entry and bordertown on the Interoceanic Highway linking the Pacific Ocean to the Atlantic. This road crosses the border some 200 meters from the main plaza across the Acre river and into the Brazilian town of Assis Brasil about 1 km away.

The Iñapari language is spoken in the district.
