= Iñapari =

Village in Peru

Coordinates: 10°56′51.64″S 69°34′35.04″W

Map showing tri-border towns Iñapari (Peru), Assis Brasil and Bolpebra (Bolivia)

Iñapari is a Peruvian village and capital of the Tahuamanu Province in the Madre de Dios Region, located on the triple border of Bolivia, Brazil and Peru. It is connected to Brazil by the Brazil-Peru Integration Bridge, an international bridge crossing the Acre River that was completed in 2006 as part of the Interoceanic Highway. As of 2017, Iñapari has a population of 2,140 people. Iñapari has been experiencing a rapid demographic growth since the opening of the Interoceanic Highway that connects São Paulo, Brazil with Lima. Its economy is based on the commerce of handcraft. There is also some incipient trade of goods with Brazil.

== Emergencies ==
On January 31, 2012, Iñapari declared a state of emergency due to the sudden arrival of about 300 Haitian immigrants travelling to Brazil through the Amazon route. The emergency occurred because the Brazilian government decided to close their borders to Haitian immigrants who were transported by human traffickers illegally within Brazilian territory.

Subsequently, on February 17 of that same year, Iñapari declared a state of emergency for 45 days due to severe flood damage caused by the overflowing of the Acre and Yaverija rivers following heavy rains. The regional administration's National Defense Office reported that 80% of the city was flooded, with 2,560 people affected, along with 512 homes and more than 10 public buildings. The severe damage and the extent of the flooding sparked a debate regarding the need to relocate the city.
