= Assis Brasil =

Municipality of Acre, Brazil

- Municipality
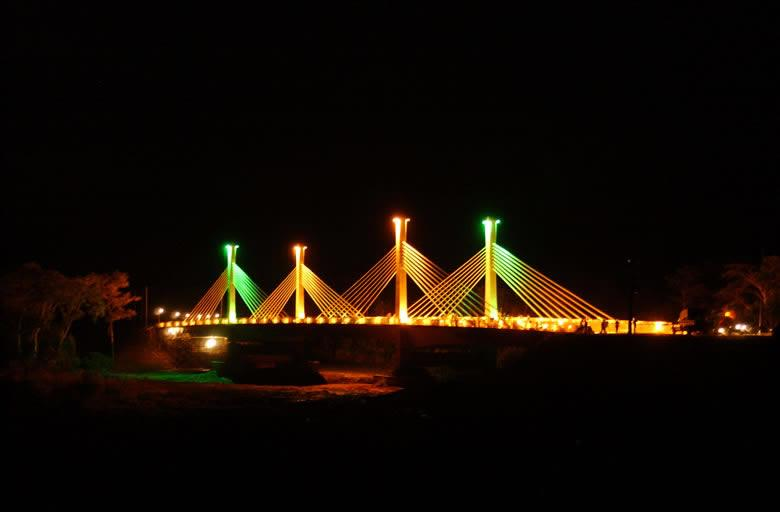

- Flag Coat of arms

- Location of municipality in Acre State

- Location in Brazil
- Country: Brazil
- State: Acre

Government
  - Mayor: Antonio Barbosa de Sousa (PSDB)

Area
  - Total: 4,974 km^{2} (1,920 sq mi)

Population (2020 est)
  - Total: 7,534
- Time zone: UTC−5 (ACT)

Assis Brasil (Brazilian Portuguese pronunciation: [aˈsiz bɾaˈziw]) is a municipality located in the south of the Brazilian state of Acre. Its population is 7,534 (2020 est) and its area is 4,974 square kilometres (1,920 sq mi).

The municipality contains part of the Rio Acre Ecological Station. It also contains part of the 931,537-hectare (2,301,880-acre) Chico Mendes Extractive Reserve, a sustainable use environmental unit created in 1990.

It is located near the Brazil–Peru Integration Bridge. It is the closest Brazilian city to Chile.

== Name ==
The municipality was named after Joaquim Francisco de Assis Brasil, a diplomat who was involved in the transference of Acre from Bolivian to Brazilian control after the Acre War.

== Towns and villages ==
- Abismo
- Assis Brasil - capital
- Maloca
- Reserva Extrema
- São Francisco, Acre
- Senegal, Acre
- Seringal Paraguacu
