= Democracy Square =

Road junction and public space in Uruguay

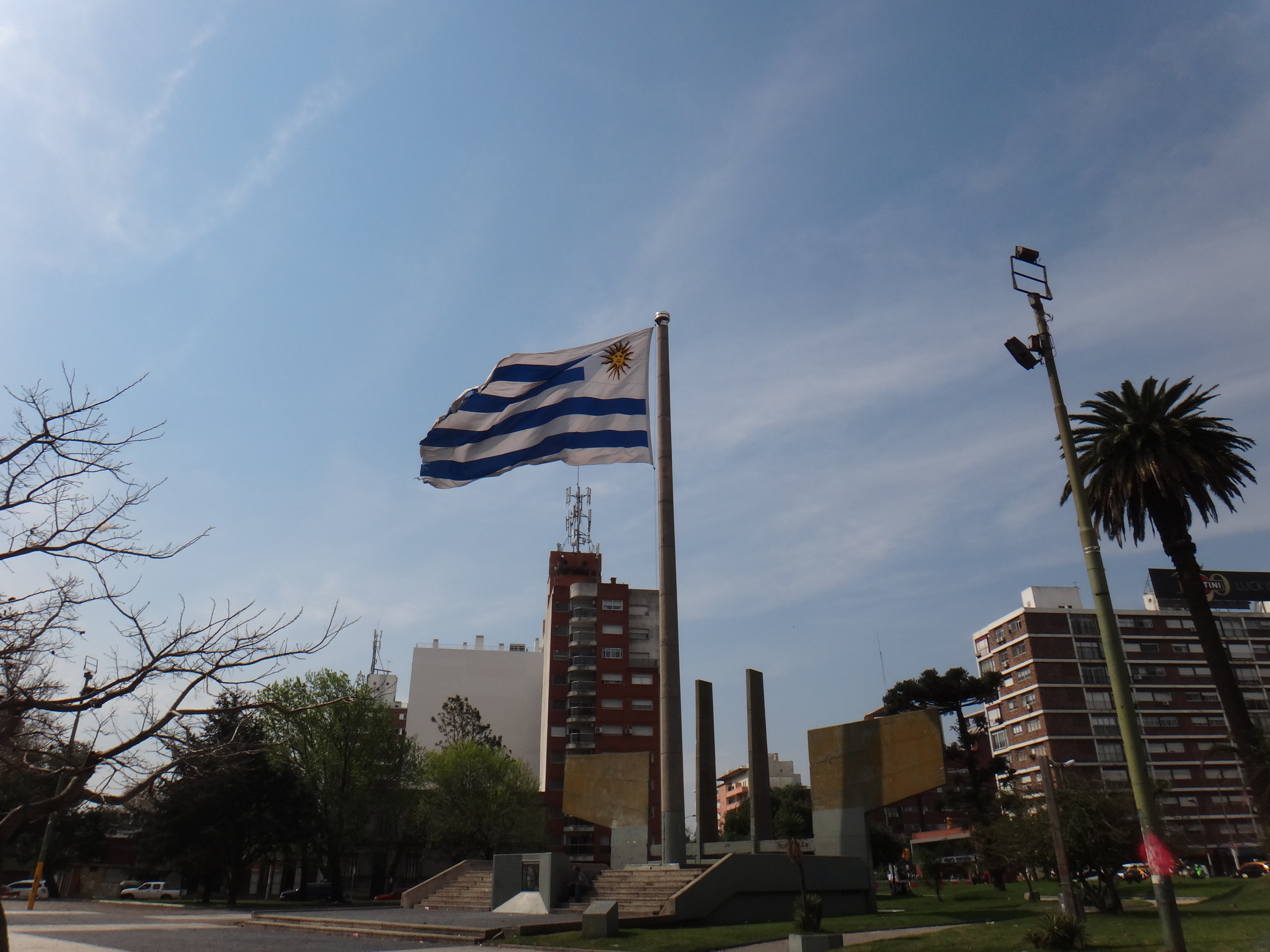
- Monument to the flag located in the center of the square in 2013
- Interactive map of Democracy Square

Location
- Montevideo, Uruguay
- Coordinates: 34.8936°S 56.1642°W
- Roads at junction: Italy Avenue, Artigas Boulevard and 8 de Octubre Avenue

Construction
- Type: Road junction and square
- Opened: 1978

Democracy Square (Spanish: Plaza de la Democracia) is a road junction and public space in the Tres Cruces neighbourhood of Montevideo, Uruguay.

The square connects Italy Avenue, Artigas Boulevard and 8 de Octubre Avenue, which are three of the most important thoroughfares in the city, due to the large amount of traffic they receive as they are different entrance routes to Central Montevideo. Democracy Square, also known as Plaza de la Bandera (Spanish for 'Flag Square') due to the flagpole at its center, is a busy meeting place as it is located across from the Tres Cruces bus station and mall, the main bus terminal in the country.

== History ==
The square was inaugurated on December 15, 1978 by the civic-military regime, and was called Plaza de la Nacionalidad Oriental (Spanish for 'Oriental Nationality Square'), and a flagpole with national flag was built on it. However, the underground tunnel located under the space, connecting 18 de Julio and 8 de Octubre avenues, had been inaugurated on July 18, 1961.

In 1985, with the end of the dictatorship, the name of the space was changed to its current.

=== Redevelopment ===
In 2011, a competition for proposals was launched in order to redevelop the square; the judges of the competition were the architects Marcelo Danza, Francisco Fernández and Carlos López Quagliata. The one-year redevelopment works covered an area of 11,800 square meters, including the flag monument, paved spaces and green areas. The work involved the creation of a circular amphitheater −alluding to the Assembly of 1813 known as the "Congress of Tres Cruces"− with stands, the installation of a water fountain and a children's playground. In addition to a space for markets or exhibitions.

The funds for the redevelopment were contributed by Gralado S.A. (concessionaire of the Terminal and Shopping Tres Cruces) in an agreement whereby the shopping center used the square as a parking lot during its expansion. The inauguration took place on October 2, 2014.

== Monuments ==
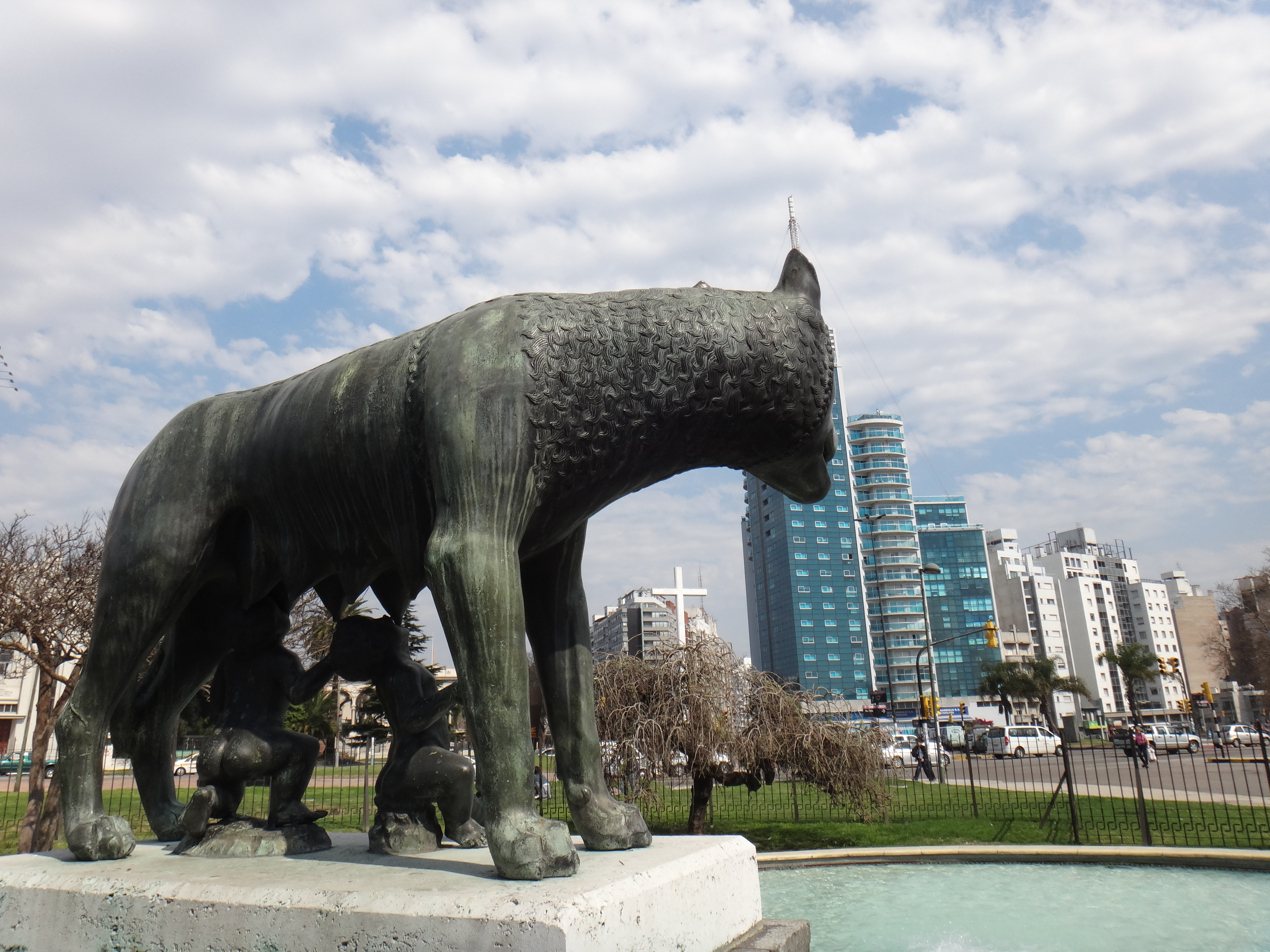
Capitoline Wolf in Democracy Squar, 2013.

In addition to the flagpole with the flag, different monuments are located on the square. A sandblasted gray granite replica of the Capitoline Wolf was installed in December 1938. On May 18, 1943, a statue of Joaquín "Ansina" Lenzina made by José Belloni on a hammered gray granite base was inaugurated. However, it was transferred to Barrio Sur in 2020.

In 2017, a monument was inaugurated in homage to the victims of the civic-military dictatorship. The sculpture was a bronze representation of two kneeling people, hooded and with their hands tied behind their backs, and was created by the sculptor Rubens Fernández Tudurí in 1986.

== Events ==
The space has been used for different events, tributes, demonstrations and political rallies. Among the events are the homage to the "fallen in defense of democratic institutions" in their fight against the Tupamaros guerrillas, and the campaign closing ceremony for the referendum on the law of urgent consideration of the Multicolor Coalition.
