= Ministry of National Defense (Uruguay) =

Government ministry of Uruguay

- Ministerio de Defensa Nacional

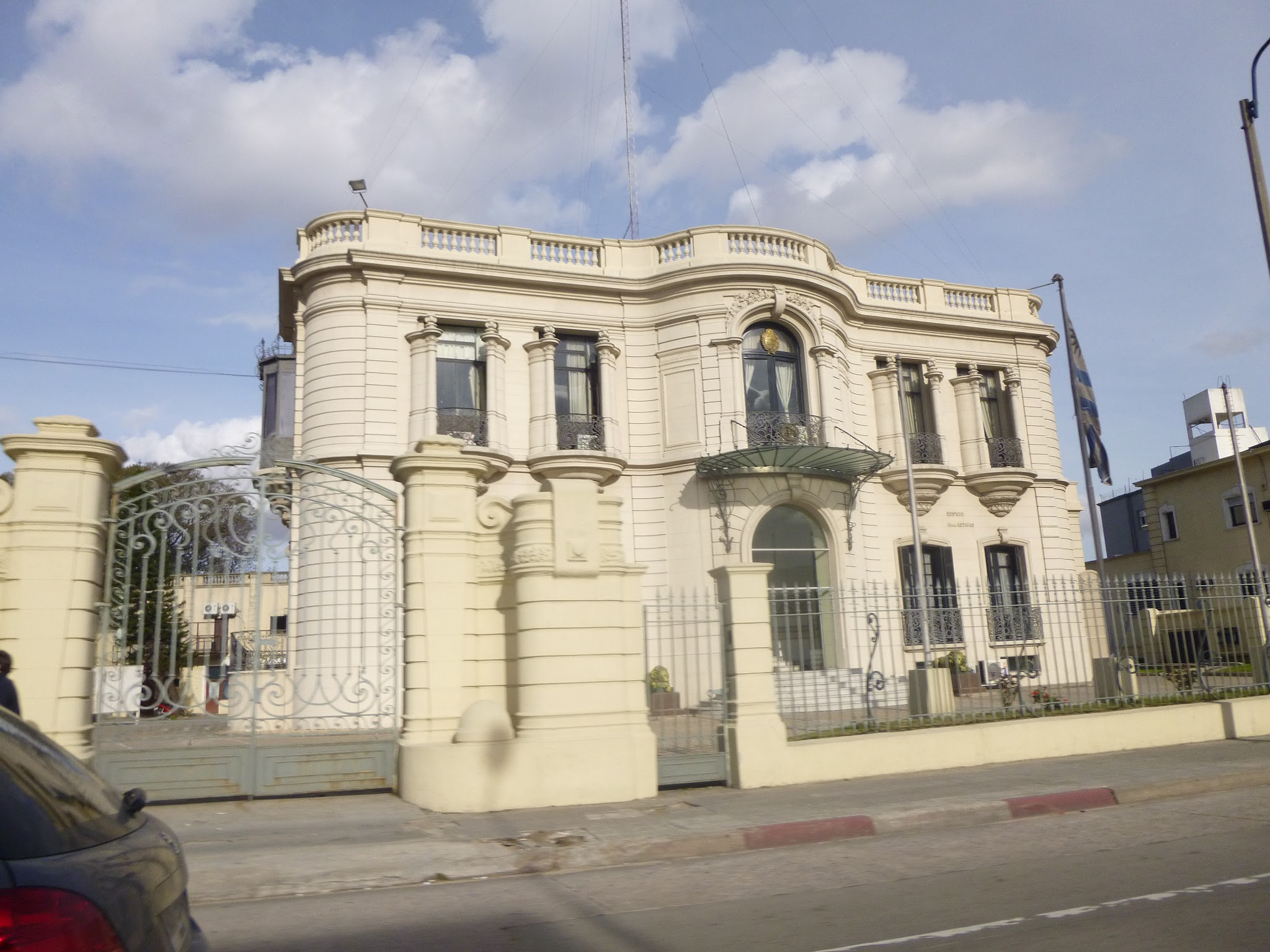

Ministry overview
- Formed: 22 December 1828
- Jurisdiction: Government of Uruguay
- Headquarters: Montevideo
- Minister responsible: Sandra Lazo
- Website: National Defense

The Ministry of National Defense (Spanish: Ministerio de Defensa Nacional) of Uruguay is a ministry of the Government of Uruguay that is responsible for coordinating and executing all civil and military activities aimed at preserving the sovereignty, independence and the peace of the country. It is the administrative and executive body of the Armed Forces of Uruguay.

The Ministry is headquartered in the 8 de Octubre Avenue in Barrio Tres Cruces, Montevideo.

== History ==
The General Constituent and Legislative Assembly established after the Preliminary Peace Convention of 1828 appointed José Rondeau as Provisional Governor. On December 22, Rondeau appointed Colonel Eugenio Garzón as Minister of War and Navy, this being the first government department dedicated to the administration of the militia in the newly created Uruguayan State.

In 1933 this government department adopted the current name of Ministry of National Defense of Uruguay. In 1987, the headquarters were installed in the old Blixen de Castro Residence on 8 de Octubre Avenue, in barrio Tres Cruces.

On March 1, 2005, Azucena Berrutti became the first woman to hold the position of defense minister in Uruguay. On April 1, 2019, President Tabaré Vázquez dismissed Minister Jorge Menéndez and the entire Defense leadership after a scandal resulting from the Special Honor Court that tried José Nino Gavazzo.

== Armed Forces ==
- National Army
- Air Force
- National Navy

== Structure ==
- Estado Mayor de la Defensa: Defense General Staff
- Dirección Nacional de Inteligencia de Estado (es): National Directorate of State Intelligence
- Hospital Central de las Fuerzas Armadas: Central Hospital of the Armed Forces
- Dirección General de los Servicios de las Fuerzas Armadas (es): General Directorate of Armed Forces Services
- Centros de Altos Estudios Nacionales (es): National High Studies Centers
- Instituto Antártico Uruguayo (es): Uruguayan Antarctic Institute
- Dirección Nacional de Meteorología (es): National Directorate of Meteorology
- Dirección Nacional de Pasos de Frontera: National Border Crossing Directorate
- Supremo Tribunal Militar: Supreme Military Court
- Dirección General de Infraestructura Aeronáutica: General Directorate of Aeronautical Infrastructure

== Headquarters ==
Its current headquarters is the General Artigas Building, formerly known as the Blixen de Castro Residence. The department settled there in 1987 after the democratic transition. The building was designed by the French architect Joseph Carré and dates from the 1910s.
