= César Bianchi =

Uruguayan writer and journalist

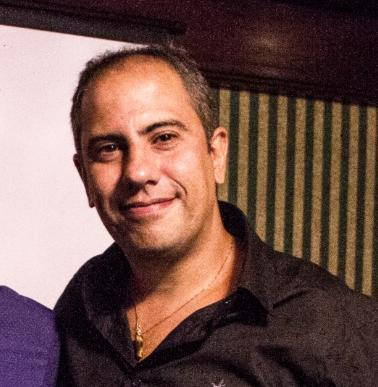
- Bianchi in 2019
- Born: César Bianchi Cabrera; 10 November 1977 (age 48); Montevideo, Uruguay
- Other name: Checho Bianchi
- Education: Universidad Católica del Uruguay; University of Alcalá
- Occupations: communicator, presenter, journalist, teacher, writern
- Website: César Bianchi

César Bianchi (born 10 November, 1977) is a Uruguayan communicator, presenter, journalist, teacher and writer.

In 2007 he was distinguished in the Latin America contest, organized by the United Nations Development Program (UNDP).

Bianchi is graduated in communication from the Catholic University of Uruguay, and later did a master's degree in journalism from the University of Alcalá, Madrid and another master's in Corporate Communication Management at the Istituto "EAE Business School". He was a professor at the Universidad ORT Uruguay from 2008 to 2016. He was a journalist for the newspaper El País, and for the television program Santo y Seña de Channel 4.

In 2007 distinguished in the Latin America contest organized by the UNDP. In 2010 finalist for the Gabo Foundation Award.

== Books ==
- 2008, Mujeres Bonitas (ISBN 9789974701557)
- 2013, A lo Peñarol (ISBN 9789974683792)
- 2014, Muertos acá nomás (ISBN 9789974713758)
- 2017, Valeria no pudo bailar. (ISBN 9789974881174)
- 2019, Cebolla Rodríguez (con Javier Tairovich).
- 2020, Sugar Daddy (ISBN 9789915652665)
