= Crandon Institute =

Higher education institution in Montevideo, Uruguay

Coordinates: 34.88886°S 56.16043°W

Crandon Institute Instituto Crandon
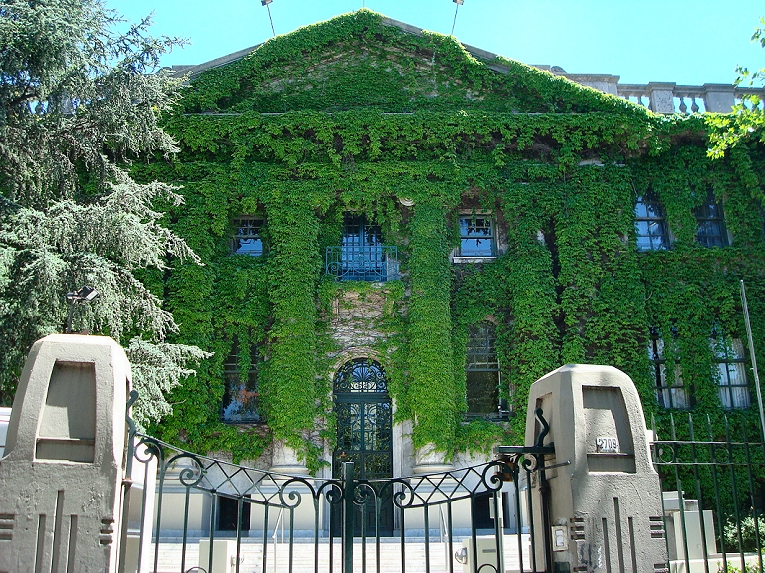
- Crandon Institute in 2010

Address
- La Blanqueada, Montevideo; Uruguay

Information
- Type: Private, methodist, bilingual
- Established: 13 February 1879
- Director: Carlos Varela
- Enrollment: 1,500
- Website: www.crandon.edu.uy

The Crandon Institute (Spanish: Instituto Crandon) is a private bilingual Methodist school in Montevideo, Uruguay. Crandon was founded in 1879 by teacher Cecilia Güelfi as the Liceo Evangélico, or Evangelical High School, and was the first school in the country with roots in the Evangelical movement.

Renamed Crandon Institute in 1906 in honor of the American Methodist Mrs. Frank P. Crandon, it is centrally located at the corner of 8 de Octubre Avenue and Garibaldi Avenue in the La Blanqueada neighborhood of Montevideo.

== Profile ==
Crandon provides classes at both the primary and secondary level and is best known for the strength of its English learning provision and courses in Home Economics. Since 1957 the gastronomy department has been responsible for publishing the Uruguayan bestseller the Crandon Institute Cooking Manual.

By 2016 the school had 1,500 students across all levels. In common with other private schools in Uruguay, demand for places has increased in recent years due to the growth in expatriates from Argentina leaving their home country for tax reasons. The current director is Professor Carlos Varela.
