= Catholic University of Uruguay =

Private university in Uruguay

- Universidad Católica del Uruguay
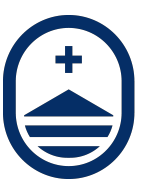
- Other name: UCU
- Motto: Latin: Veritas liberabit vos ('The truth will set you free')
- Type: Private University
- Established: 1876; reopened 1985
- Religious affiliation: Society of Jesus (Roman Catholic)
- Students: Over 10,000
- Location: 2738 8 de Octubre Avenue, Montevideo, Uruguay
- Colors: Blue and White
- Website: www.ucu.edu.uy
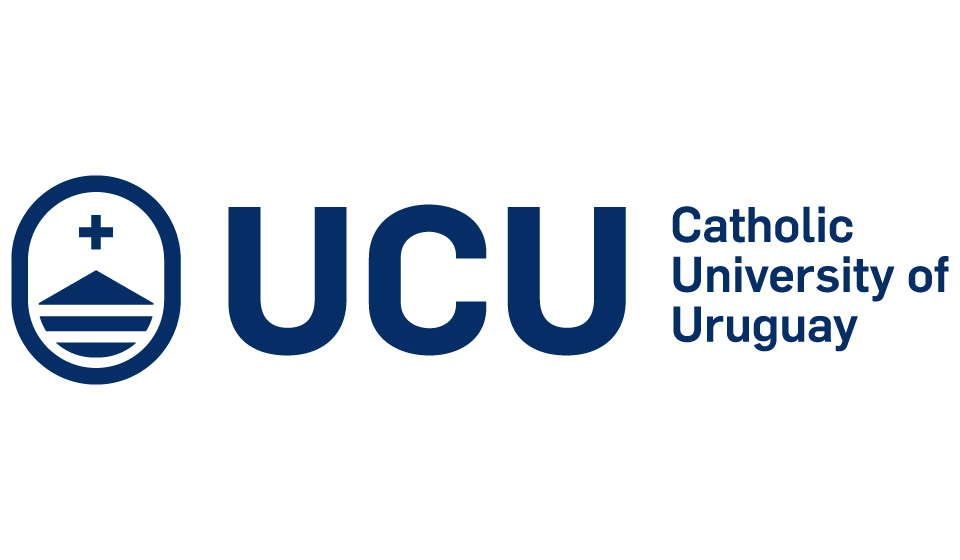

Catholic University of Uruguay (UCU; Spanish: Universidad Católica del Uruguay) is a private university in Uruguay. Established in 1985 as the successor to several Catholic educational institutes dating back to the 1870s, it was the country's only private religious university until 1996. It is affiliated with the Society of Jesus and is part of the worldwide network of Jesuit universities.

The university's main campus is spread across eight locations in Montevideo, while its two other campuses are located in Punta del Este and Salto. The institution comprises four faculties, offering a total of more than 55 undergraduate degree programs, and two independent schools: the UCU Business School and the Graduate School, both of which offer postgraduate programs. In the 2026 QS World University Rankings, UCU was placed in the 801–850 band globally, ranking second nationally and making it the highest-ranked private institution in Uruguay.

== History ==
The origins of the Catholic University of Uruguay date back to 1876, when Mariano Soler, then Bishop of Montevideo, established the Liceo de Estudios Universitarios (Spanish for 'Lyceum of University Studies'), an educational institution intended to provide young people with instruction in science and religion. By 1886, the institution had evolved into a private university, but it was subsequently closed due to restrictive legislation governing secondary and higher education.

Main university building in 1925

In September 1953, during the National Congress of Catholic Education, presided over by Archbishop Antonio María Barbieri, a proposal was put forward to establish a Catholic institution of higher education in Uruguay. The following year, the Sisters of the Sacred Heart of Jesus founded the Institute of Philosophy, which began operating in March 1954.

In 1967, following the introduction of courses in additional fields, including the arts and chemistry, it was renamed the Institute of Philosophy, Sciences and Letters (IFCL). Throughout its existence, the institute also offered courses in psychology, journalism, history, social work, social communication sciences and business management.

In 1981, the Episcopal Conference of Uruguay submitted a proposal for the establishment of a Catholic university in the country, with the IFCL serving as the foundation for the new institution. On August 22, 1984, Decree No. 343/984 authorized the establishment of the Universidad Católica del Uruguay and officially recognized its academic programs. The university began its activities in 1985, under the leadership of Bishop Luis del Castillo Estrada, who became its first rector.

== Campus ==
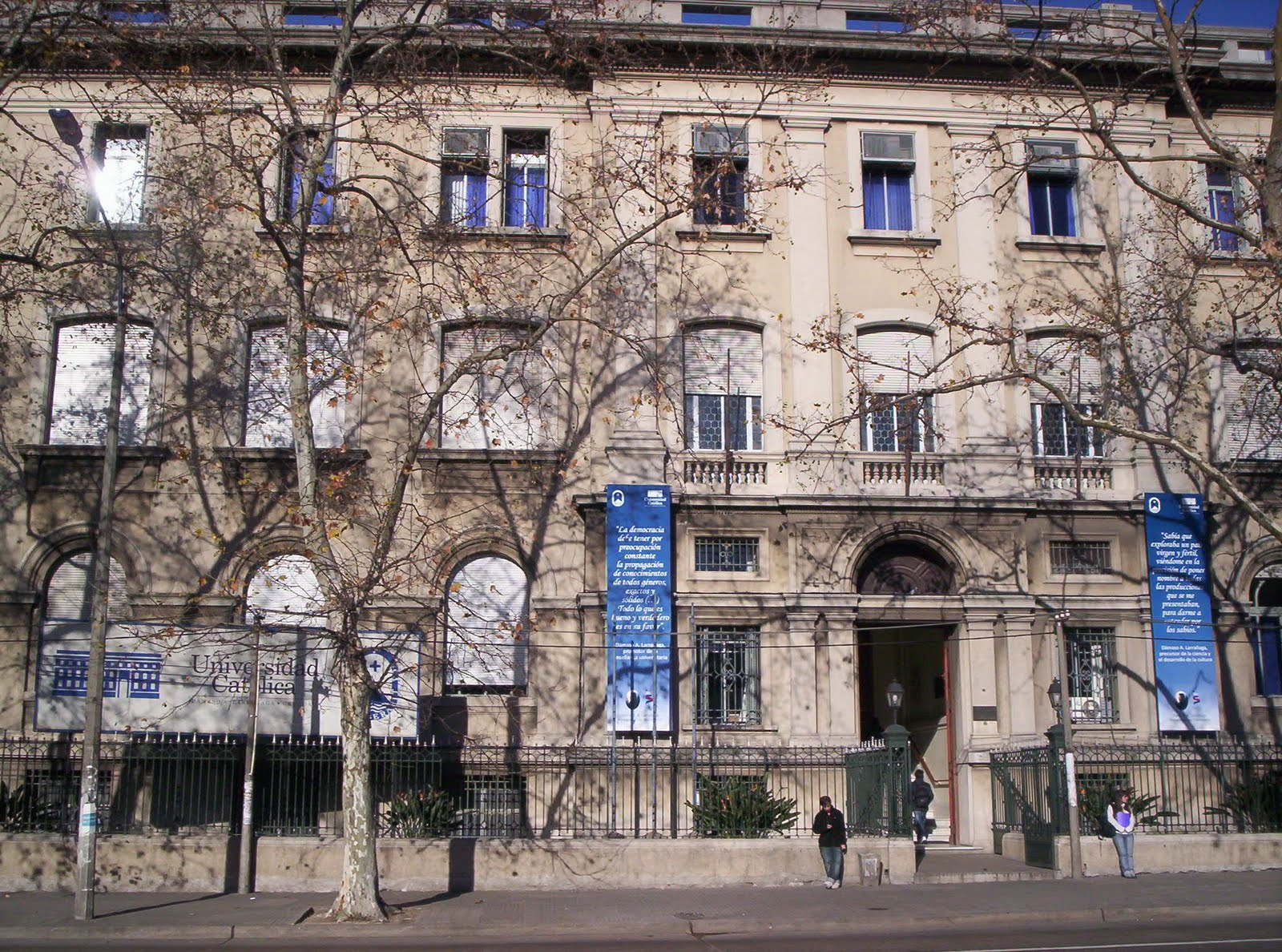
Main university building in 2013

The Catholic University of Uruguay comprises several academic and administrative buildings across its three campuses, located in Montevideo, Salto and Punta del Este.

The UCU campus in Montevideo consists of several buildings located in the residential neighborhood of La Blanqueada. The Sacré Cœur Building, situated on 8 de Octubre Avenue, serves as the university's main building. Designed by architect Elzeario Boix and completed in 1920, the neoclassical building formerly housed the Sacré Cœur Jesuit School for girls until the early 1980s. The university also uses the Church of Our Lady of Sorrows for pastoral activities.

The Punta del Este campus is located on Franklin D. Roosevelt Avenue in the neighborhood of Lugano. Inaugurated in 1998, it initially consisted of the Candelaria Building, which houses classrooms and common areas. In 2024, the university announced plans to expand the campus through the construction of a second building, named San Fernando.

The Salto campus consists of a single building located in the city center. Opened in 2003, it also serves as the headquarters of the university's Economic Observatory.

=== List of buildings—Montevideo campus ===
Building	Image	Built	Location	Notes	Ref
Sacré Cœur Building		1920	2738 8 de Octubre Avenue 34.888560°S 56.159441°W	Main university building. It houses classrooms, the library, a restaurant, the main auditorium, various conference rooms, and administrative offices.	
Mullin Building		2007	2715 Comandate Braga St. 34.886883°S 56.158706°W	Named in honor of Carlos Arturo Mullin, a Jesuit priest and rector of the Instituto de Filosofía, Ciencias y Letras—an institution that preceded the University—the building houses the Faculty of Engineering and Technology, classrooms, and laboratories. In mid-2026, it began undergoing a major transformation and is set to be renamed Mullin Tech.	
Semprún Building		2021	2271 Estero Bellaco St. 34.888208°S 56.158839°W	It houses the UCU Business School (UCUBS), the Graduate School, and conference rooms.	
San Ignacio Building		2012	2733 Cornelio Cantera St. 34.889041°S 56.158478°W	Five-story annex building to Sacré Cœur, housing classrooms and administrative offices.	
San José Building		2025	2733 8 de Octubre Avenue 34.888550°S 56.159491°W	It houses classrooms, common areas, an auditorium, and the University Health Clinic, which includes laboratories, consulting rooms, and administrative offices.	
Athanasius Building		2020	2871 Urquiza Street 34.886289°S 56.1588959°W	It houses the Centro Ignis, the university’s audiovisual and artistic production facility, consisting of radio studios as well as soundstages.	
Madre Marta Building			2831 Garibaldi Avenue 34.890170°S 56.158309°W	It houses facilities of the Faculty of Health Sciences.	
Xalambrí House		1949	2728 Cornelio Cantera Street 34.888970°S 56.158415°W	Historic building dating from the early decades of the 20th century, housing classrooms and a garden as a common space.	

== International accreditations ==
The School of Business Sciences and the UCU Business School (UCUBS) have been accredited by the Association to Advance Collegiate Schools of Business (AACSB) since October 2021, making the University the only one in Uruguay with this certification. Since September 2023, the UCU Business School (UCUBS) has also been accredited by the International Accreditation Advisory Board of the Association of MBAs (AMBA) and the Business Graduates Association (BGA).

== Student life ==
As a fundamental objective of the University, it seeks that its students live beyond the classroom, incorporating extracurricular activities such as sports, with the Universidad Católica Club; artistic experiences such as the UCU Choir and the Espacio Crear; in addition to its traditional Pastoral.

The University has an extensive academic exchange network. It has links with more than 300 universities in countries of the five continents. It receives about 200 foreign students annually.

== Programs ==
In 2015 the university partnered with Orkestra-Basque Institute of Competitiveness to address the issue of competition between companies. Also, in conjunction with a professor at Pennsylvania State University, researchers at UCU study the effects of iron deficiency and lead toxicity on behavioral and cognitive development in children. In 2016 the university signed an agreement of cooperation with the newly founded University of Tifariti.

Sponsored sports activities include futsal (male and female), volleyball, basketball, women's handball, swimming, football, and hockey. The university offers students workshops to develop their artistic abilities in chorus, theater, and visual arts.

Service projects are carried on for credit as integral or supplemental to classwork, as well as through voluntary projects without academic credit. In 2015 Extension Services at UCU counted 141 projects with 191 teachers and 1,700 students involved. A major vacation-time project is building homes for the poor,

There are student-organized events and tournaments throughout the year, and a series of workshops voted for by the students to foster their special interests. There is also a club which raises environmental awareness by collecting all plastic bottles on campus.

== Departments ==
The university is divided into five faculties, and two schools: UCU Business School and the School of Postgraduate Courses.

=== Majors ===
- Faculty of Business Sciences
  - Public accountant
  - Finance
  - Business Administration
  - Business Administration in Tourism
  - Economics
  - Human Relations and Labor Relations
  - International Negotiations
- Faculty of Engineering and Technologies
  - Food Engineering
  - Electric Engineering
  - Engineering in Informatics
  - Engineering in High-power Electronic Systems
  - Telecommunications Engineering
  - Industrial Engineering
  - Informatics
  - Audiovisual Engineering
- Faculty of Health Sciences
  - Dentist
  - Dental Assistant
  - Medicine
  - Nursing
  - Physiotherapy
  - Speech therapy
  - Nutrition
  - Psychology
  - Psychopedagogy
  - Therapeutic Accompaniment
- Faculty of Law and Human Sciences
  - Attorney-at-Law
  - Notary Public
  - Visual arts
  - Politic science
  - Social communication
  - Early childhood education
  - Educational Recreation
  - Sociology
  - Social work

== Gallery ==
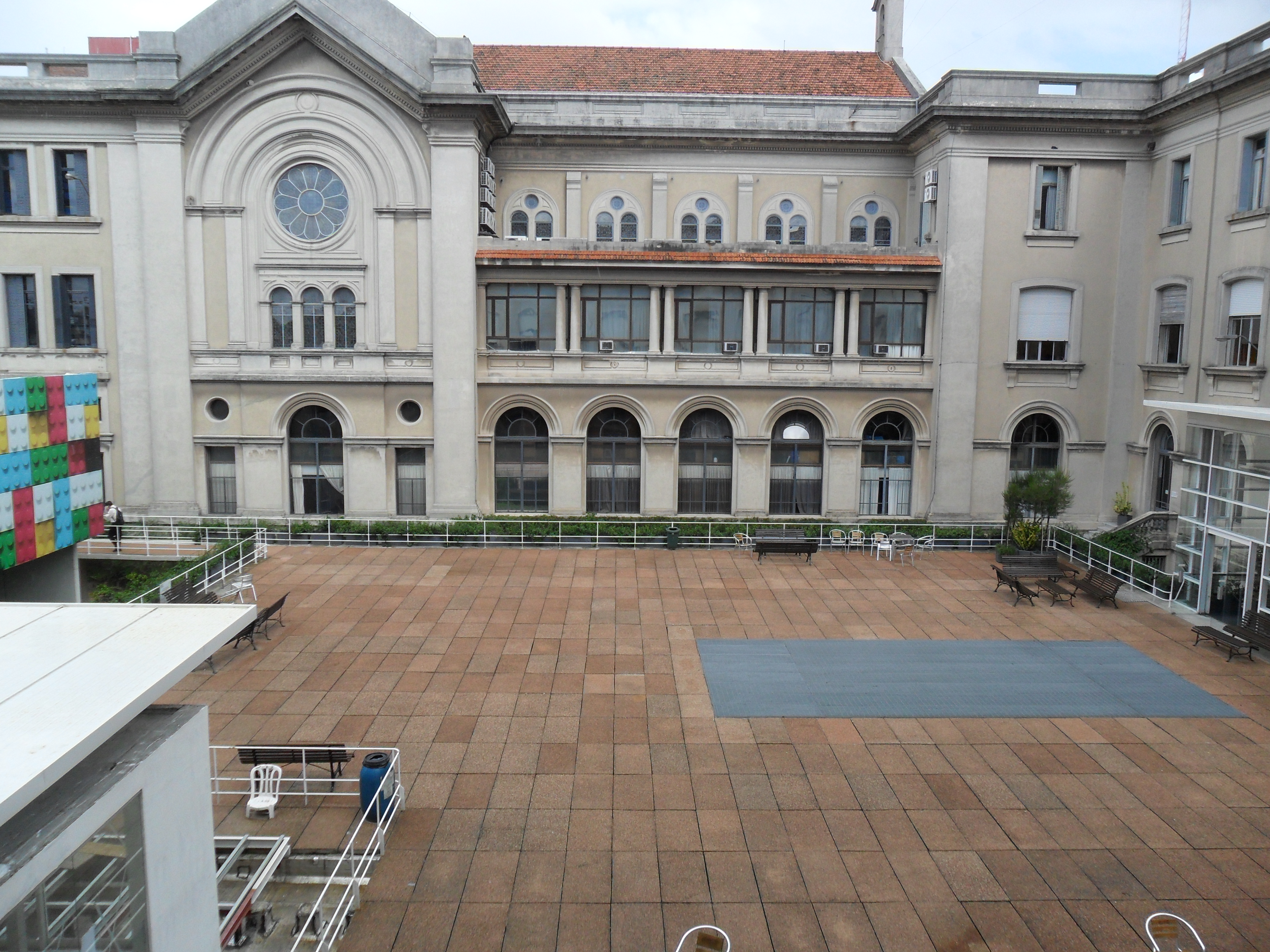
Montevideo Campus.

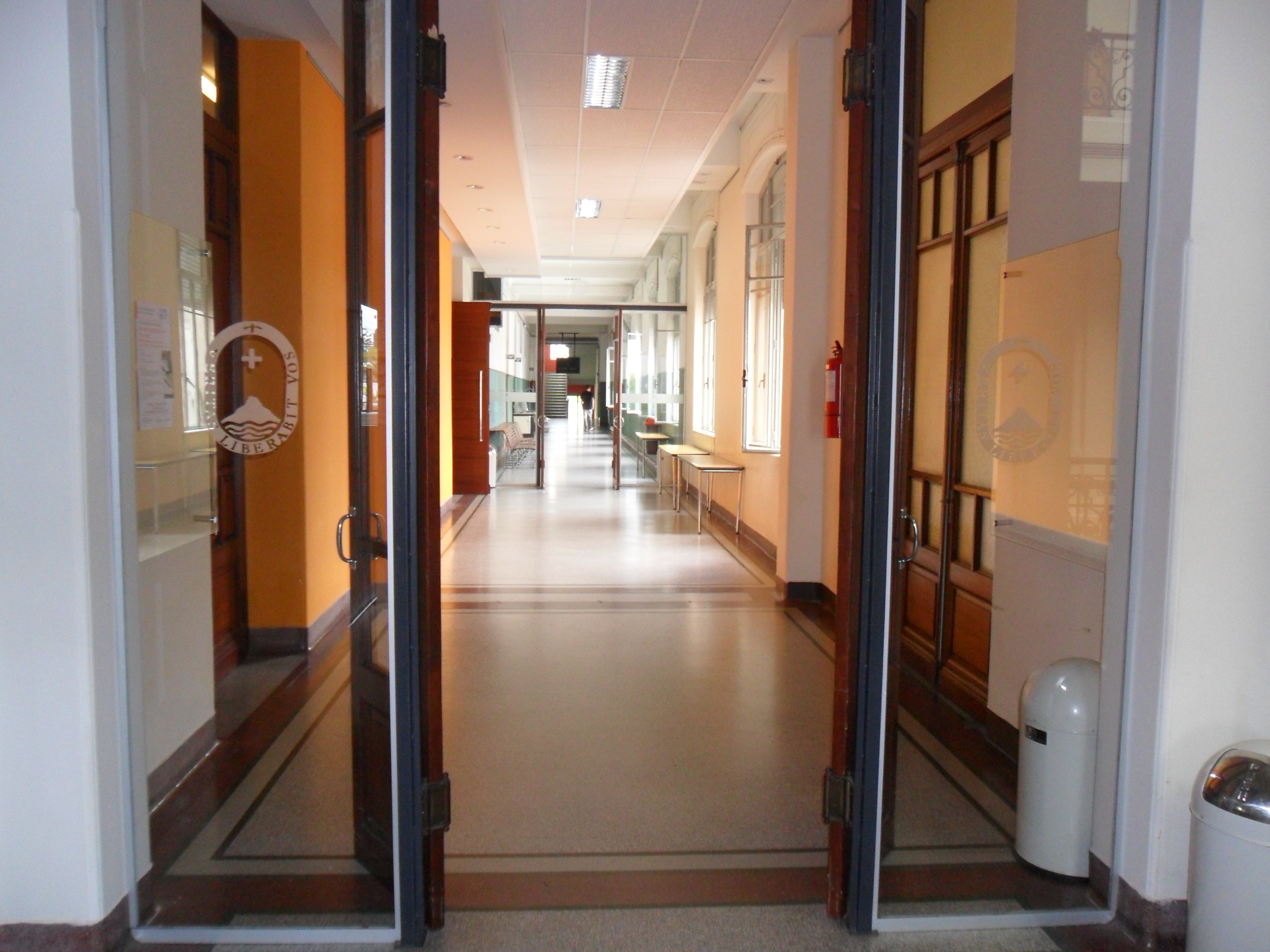
Montevideo Campus Entrance.

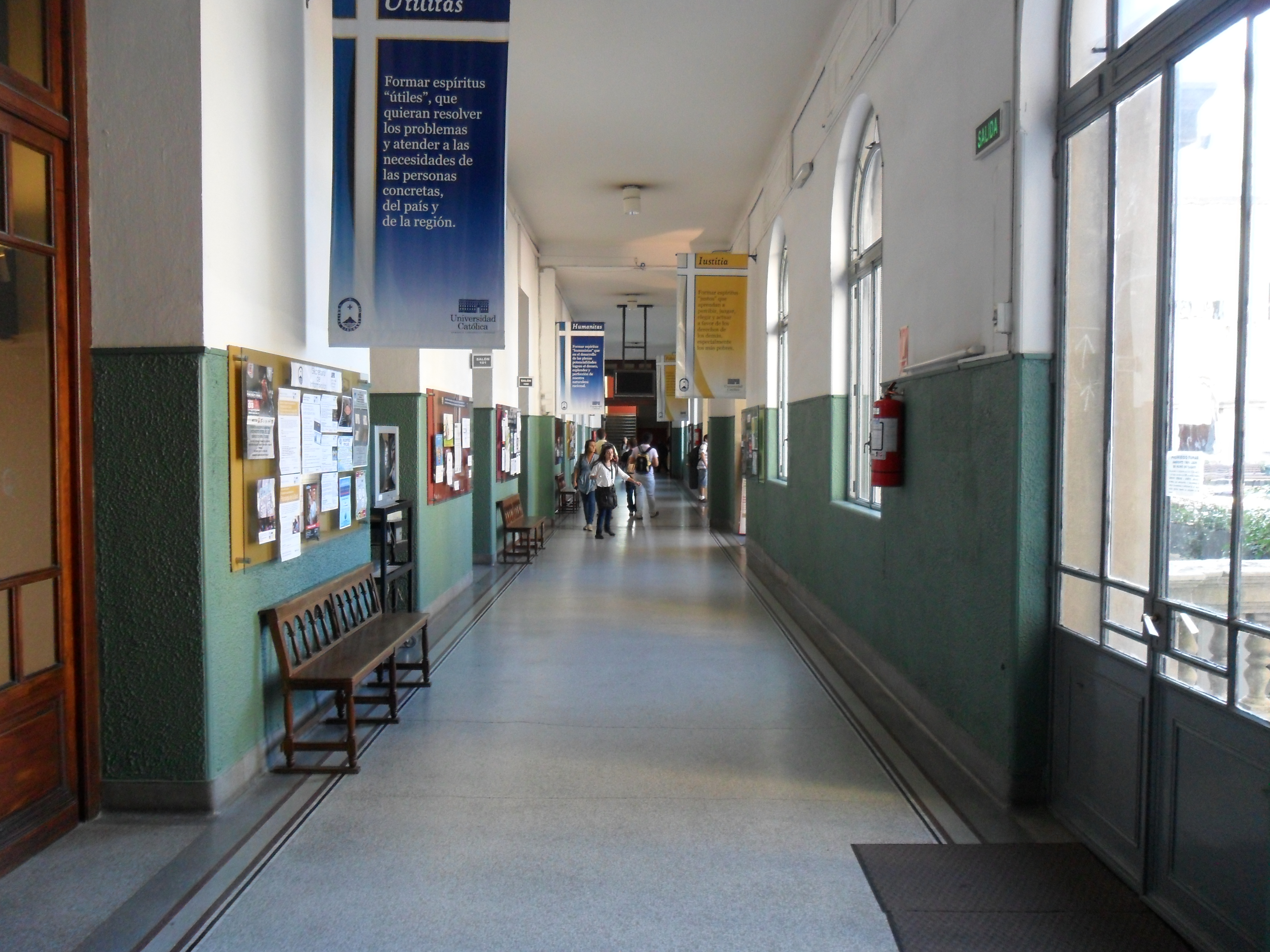
Main Building Corridor.

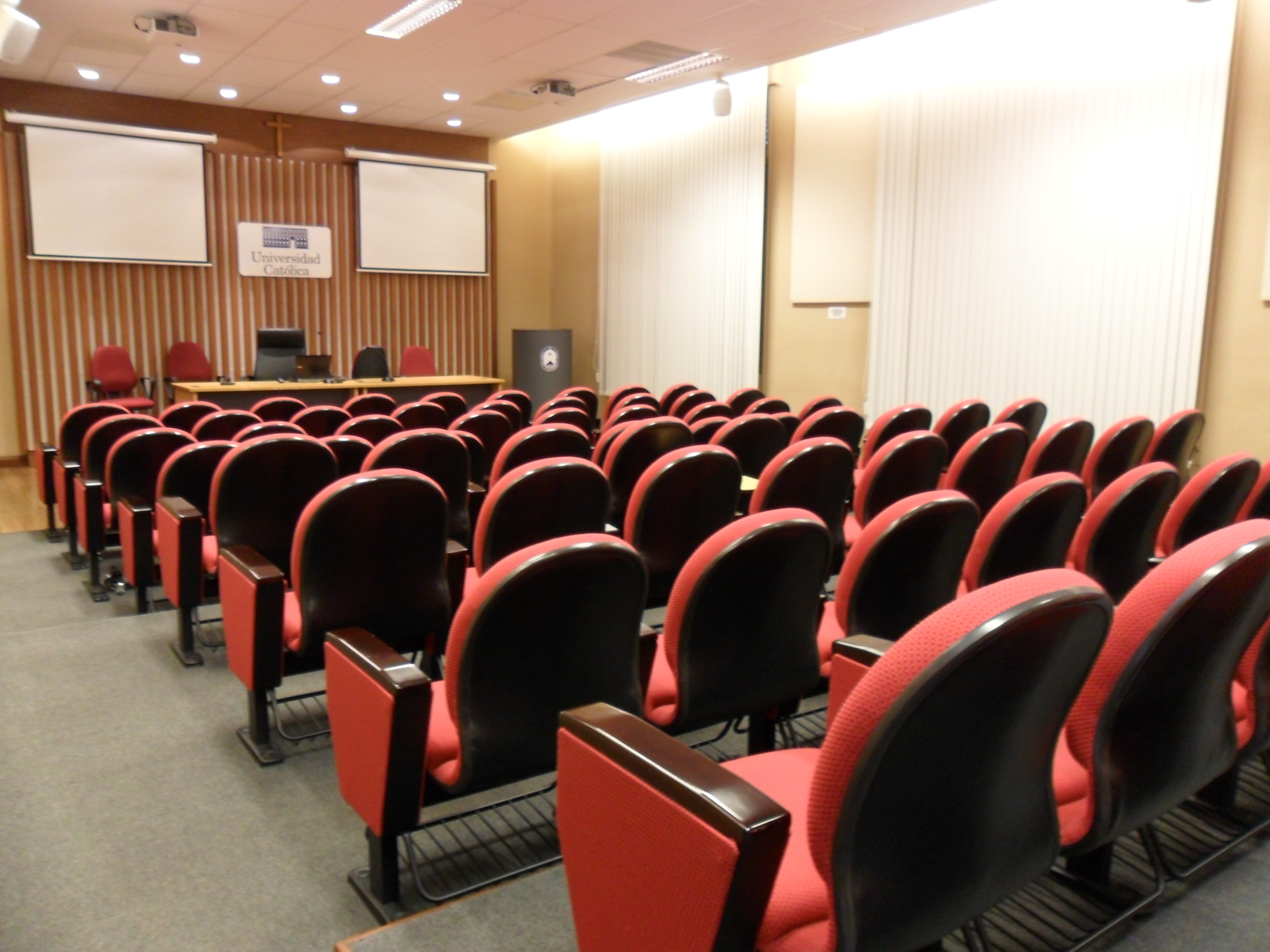
Bauzá Hall.

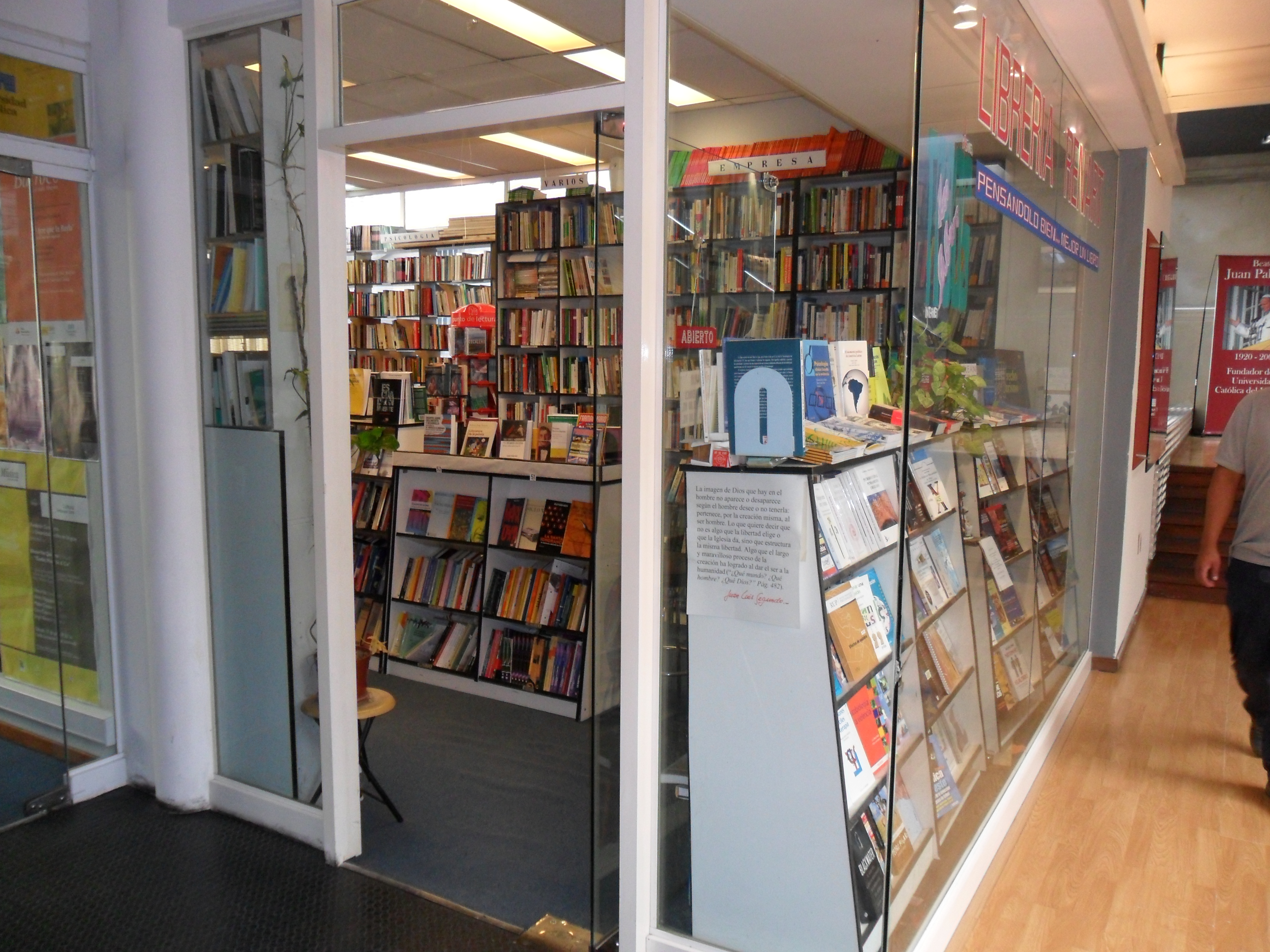
University Bookstore.

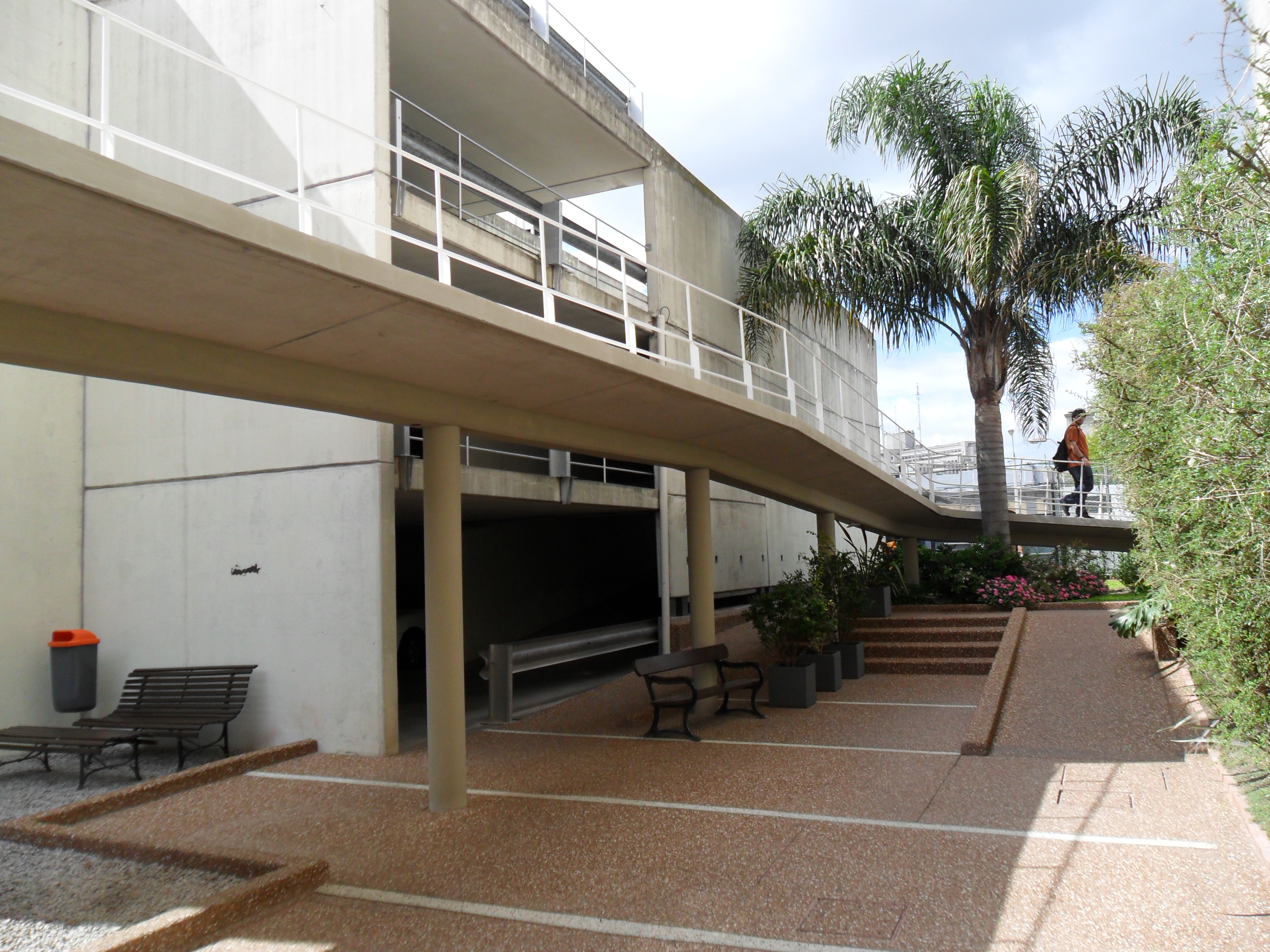
Exteriors of the Montevideo Campus.

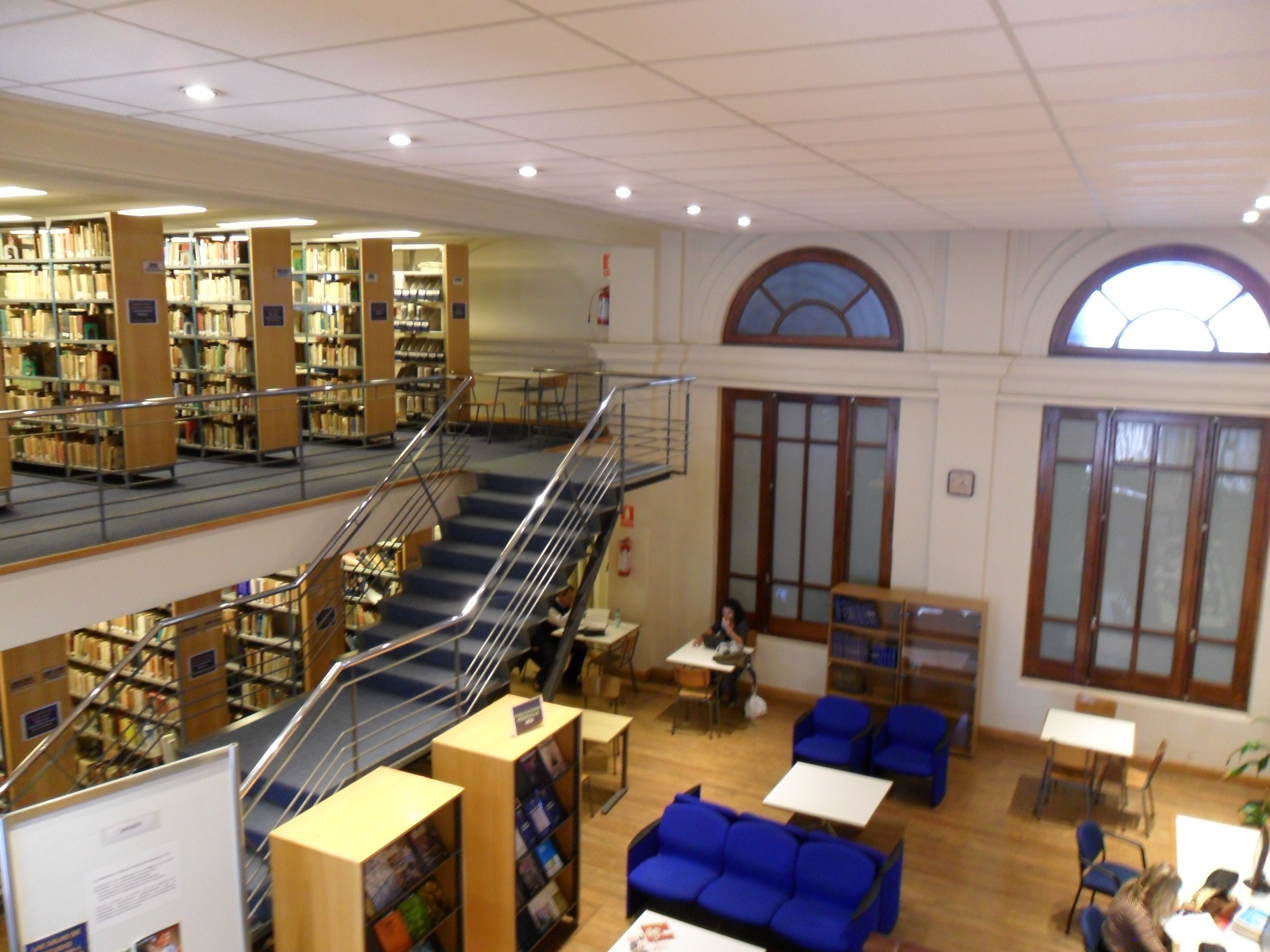
University Library.

== See also ==
- List of Jesuit sites
