= Médica Uruguaya =

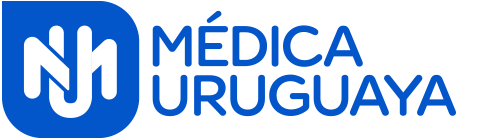

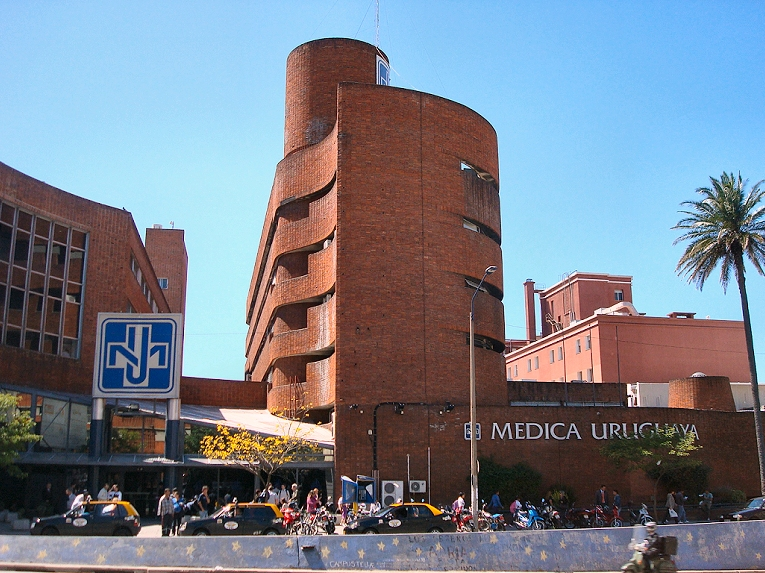
- Medica Uruguaya main facility in Montevideo

Geography
- Location: 2492 8 de Octubre Avenue, Montevideo, Uruguay

Organisation
- Care system: Private

History
- Founded: February 3, 1956 (70 years ago)

Links
- Website: www.medicauruguaya.com.uy
- Lists: Hospitals in Uruguay

Médica Uruguaya, officially Médica Uruguaya Corporación de Asistencia Médica (MUCAM), is a private healthcare provider in Uruguay. It operates as an institución de asistencia médica colectiva, a type of non-profit health organization that provides comprehensive medical services to its members.

The institution is part of Uruguay’s National Integrated Health System, combining private management with strong public regulation. Its services are financed through a mix of member contributions and public funding, allowing affiliated users to access healthcare coverage. As of 2026, Médica Uruguaya maintains a network of outpatient clinics located throughout the country, as well as a central hospital facility in Montevideo where inpatient and specialized medical services are provided.

== History ==
The origins of Médica Uruguaya date back to several earlier medical institutions, including the Institución Fraternal Americana, the Institución Humanitaria, and the Unión Médica. Around the 1930s, these entities were acquired by Francisco Golino, who subsequently merged them. In 1934, the unified institution adopted the name “Médica Uruguaya”.

In 1939, its founder and principal director, Francisco Golino, sold the institution to Dr. Francisco Paternó. In the following years, Paternó gradually transferred the management of the organization to its medical and non-medical staff, laying the foundations for a corporative structure that would develop over time.

Under Paternó’s leadership, the institution continued providing healthcare services, maintaining and expanding the coverage previously offered to its members. This process ultimately led to the formal establishment of a medical and assistance corporation, with Médica Uruguaya being formally constituted on 8 August 1958.

The institutional transformation was completed on 2 February 1965, when its statutes were approved by the National Council of Government, formally creating Médica Uruguaya Corporación de Asistencia Médica. In its early years, the institution’s main sanatorium was located in central Montevideo, at the intersection of Río Branco and Soriano streets. It later expanded by acquiring a former estate owned by the Lycée Français, along with adjacent properties in the Tres Cruces neighborhood, where its central medical facility was subsequently developed.
