= Tres Cruces bus station =

Bus station in Montevideo, Uruguay

Tres Cruces Bus Station
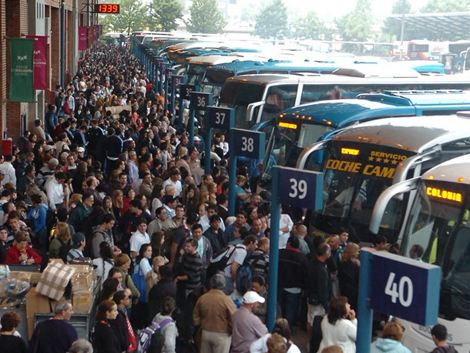

General information
- Location: Artigas Boulevard 1825; Montevideo, Uruguay
- Coordinates: 34.8938°S 56.1664°W
- Platforms: 49 gates

Other information
- Website: www.trescruces.com.uy

History
- Opened: November 16, 1994; 31 years ago

Passengers
- 12 100 000
Location

Tres Cruces bus station (Spanish:Terminal Tres Cruces) is the main bus terminal in Uruguay. It is located in the Tres Cruces district, in Montevideo.

== Overview ==
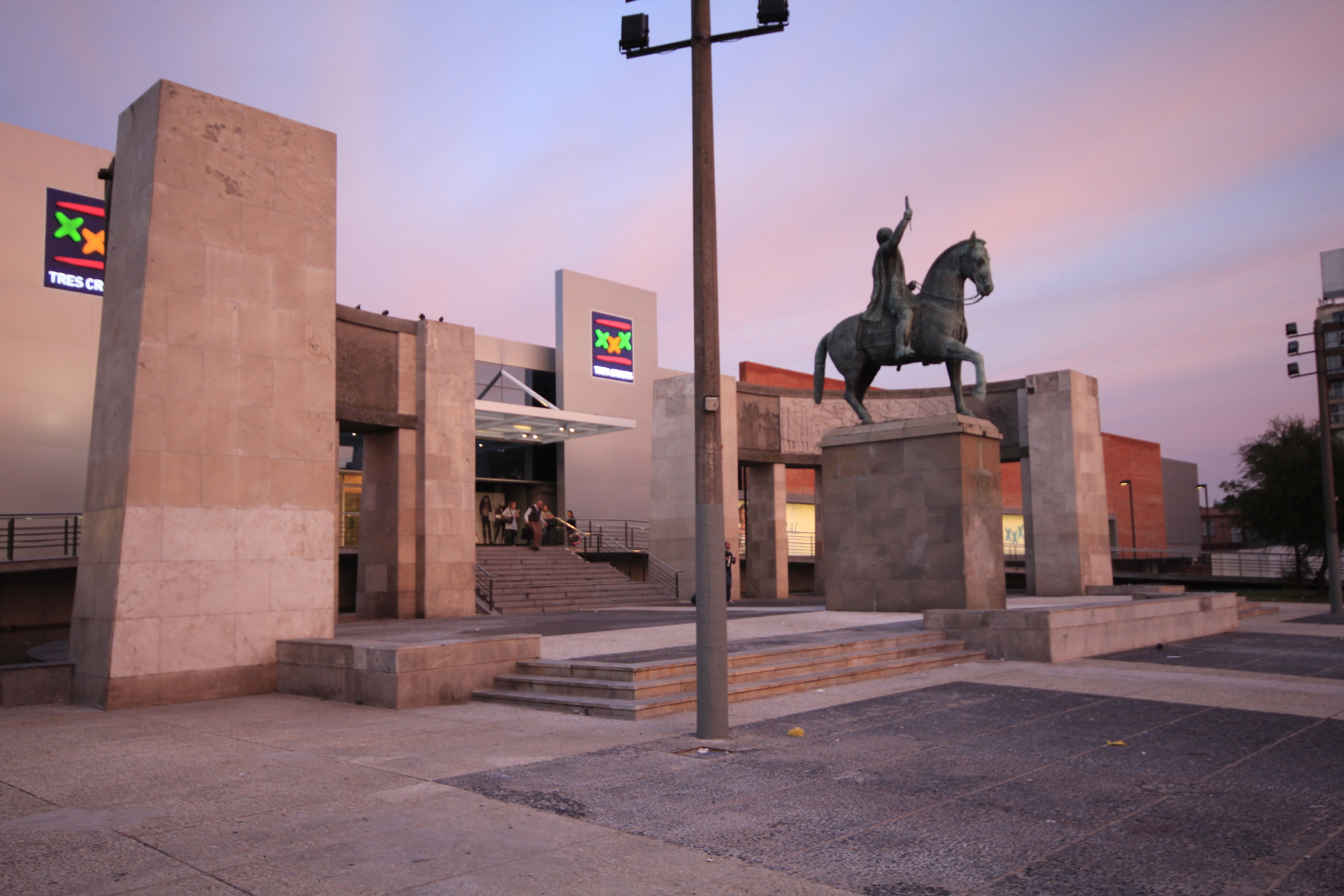
Main facade and monument to Fructuoso Rivera, first president of Uruguay.

On July 11, 1991, President Luis A. Lacalle signed the agreement for the construction of the Bus Terminal. The building was designed by the studio of the architect Guillermo Gómez Platero, with the collaboration of Enrique Cohe and Roberto Alberti. The station was inaugurated on November 16, 1994. The structure is brick. Tres Cruces concentrates the largest passenger traffic in the country, from there national and international destinations are operated. Every year, around 20,000,000 people visit this bus station. In the building, there is also a shopping center.

== See also ==
- Transportation in Uruguay
- Tres Cruces district
