= Jorge Menéndez =

Uruguayan doctor and politician (1951–2019)

Jorge Edgardo Menéndez Corte (13 August 1951 – 11 April 2019) was an Uruguayan doctor and politician who served as Minister of Defense from August 2016 to April 2019.
