= Avenida Italia =

Street in Montevideo, Uruguay

Italy Avenue
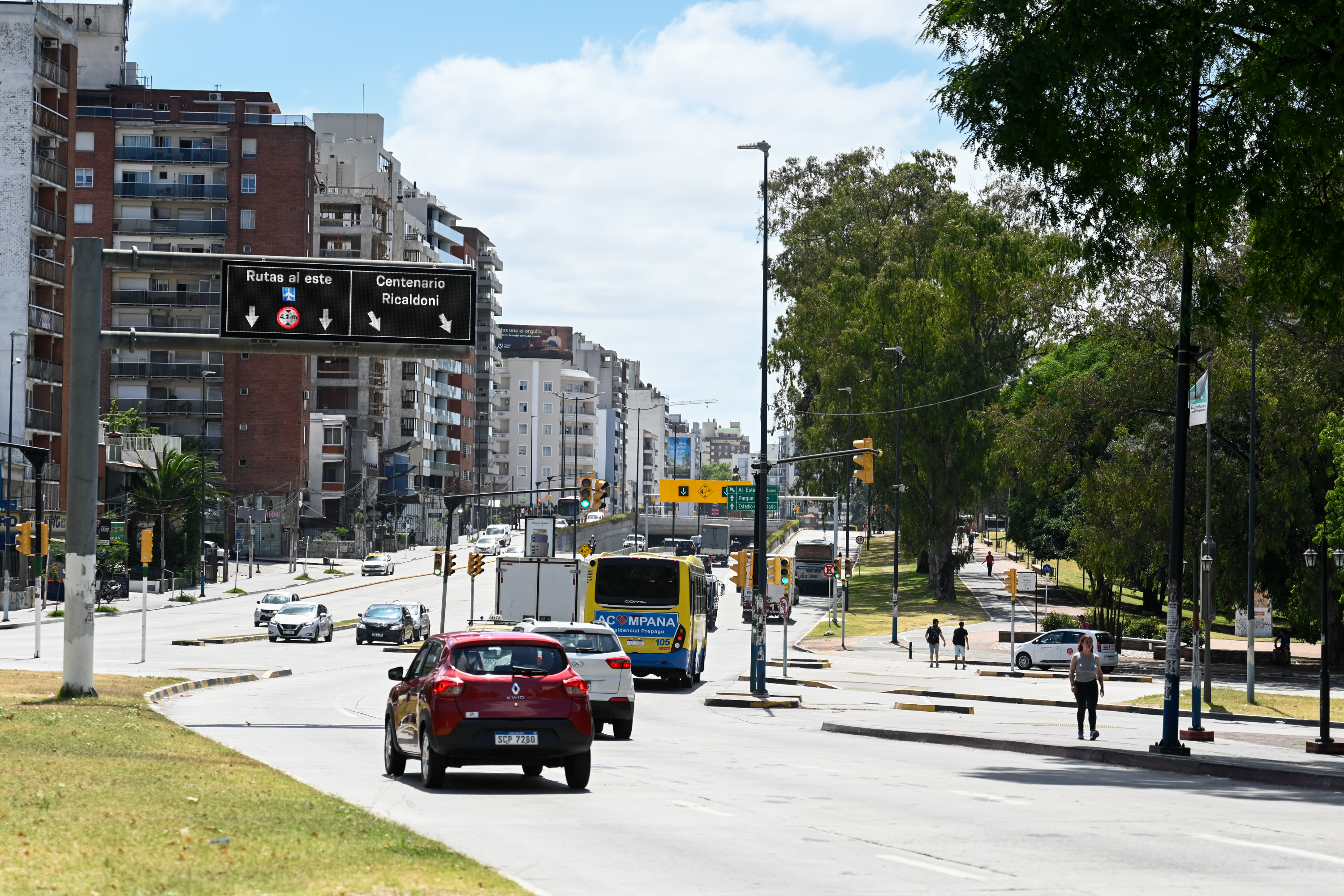

- Italia Ave in Montevideo
- Native name: Avenida Italia (Spanish)
- Location: Montevideo, Uruguay
- From: Tres Cruces
- To: Puente de las Américas

Italy Avenue (Spanish: Avenida Italia) is a major thoroughfare in Montevideo, Uruguay. Its name honors the country from whose immigrants about 40% of Uruguayans descend. It runs almost parallel to Gral Rivera Avenue, the Rambla and Camino Carrasco, constituting the main arterial road of the city, since it connects with the network of highways that lead to the east of the country.

It extends through several neighborhoods heading east, and ends with the intersection with Avenida Luis Giannattasio (which runs through Ciudad de la Costa and Avenida de las Américas (which leads to the Carrasco International Airport and the Interbalnearia and 101 routes), in the Canelones Department.

In 2017, a project was presented for the construction of a tunnel for Avenida Italia, extended below Centenario Ave. On March 18, 2021, the uneven passage of Italia and Centenario avenues was officially operational, on the path that goes to the Center (westbound). This is the third tunnel in the city, after the one on 8 de Octubre Ave and the City Hall.

== Landmarks ==
The main landmarks along this avenue are:

- Portones Shopping Center
- Manuel Quintela Clinic Hospital
- Plaza Italia Shopping
