= University of Tifariti =

University in Tifariti, Western Sahara

- جامعة تيفاريتي
- Other name: UTIFARITI
- Type: Public
- Established: 2013
- Rector: Jatari Hamudi
- Dean: Moulay M'hamed Brahim
- Location: Tifariti, Liberated Territories, Western Sahara
- Website: universidadtifariti.org

The University of Tifariti (UTIFARITI; Arabic: جامعة تيفاريتي, Spanish: Universidad de Tifariti) is a university in Tifariti, Western Sahara.

== History ==
The University of Tifariti is the first Sahrawi university, established in 2013 under Presidential Decree 24/2012 of 23 December 2012. President of the Sahrawi Arab Democratic Republic Mohamed Abdelaziz also appointed Khatari Ahmudi Abdallahi as its first president.

== International academic collaboration ==
The idea of founding a university in the Sahrawi liberated territories has existed since at least 2009, with the help of many other universities of the world, including the University of Leeds (United Kingdom), National Autonomous University of Nicaragua (Nicaragua), University of California, Berkeley (United States), University of Pretoria (South Africa), University of Santiago de Compostela (Spain), University of Havana (Cuba), University of Mentouri (Algeria) and a dozen others from Africa, America and Europe.

== Sahrawi government support ==
Sahrawi authorities have offered free basic education to children in the Sahrawi refugee camps, enabling them to rise from one of Africa's lowest literacy levels to over 90% literacy. However, prior to the university's founding, students had to travel abroad for higher education.
