= Artigas Boulevard =

Street in Montevideo, Uruguay

Coordinates: 34°55′45″S 56°09′40″W

- View of Boulevard Artigas to the north

- Native name: Spanish: Bulevar General José Artigas
- Length: 10.5 km (6.5 mi)
- From: Punta Carretas
- To: Bella Vista

Construction
- Completed: 1878

Artigas Boulevard is a boulevard in Montevideo, Uruguay. It runs from the Rambla at Punta Carretas to the Rambla at Capurro-Bella Vista, going north for about 6.5 kilometers and turning 100° west. It is an important connection road in the Uruguayan capital, linking the central barrios of the city, with access to different national routes.

== History ==
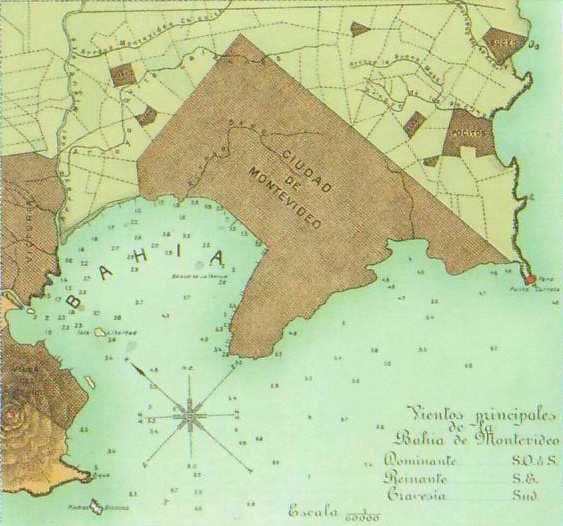
Detail of an 1893 map of Uruguay showing the actual Artigas Boulevard as the outer limits of the city.

After the Uruguayan Civil War, the city began a strong expansion, so the authorities looked for a way to organize the growth of what was called the "Ciudad Nueva" ("New City") —area outside the old city, which began to develop after the demolition of the fortifications. The avenue delimited the old city and that is why it turns 100° to the west. Because of this, in 1878 the layout of a boulevard was approved, which gave rise to the Novísima Ciudad (Most New City). At first it was called "Circunvalación Boulevard", but in 1885 it was named "General José Artigas Boulevard", after the national hero.

On its way, it crosses or borders 16 barrios of Montevideo. It intersects some of the main avenues of the city, like Avenida Agraciada, Avenida General Flores, Avenida 8 de Octubre, and the Rambla of Montevideo, all of which connect to main roads linking Montevideo with the other cities of Uruguay.

== Landmarks ==
The main landmarks along this boulevard are:

- Italian Hospital of Montevideo
- Democracy Square
- Obelisk of Montevideo
- Parva Domus Palace

== Gallery ==
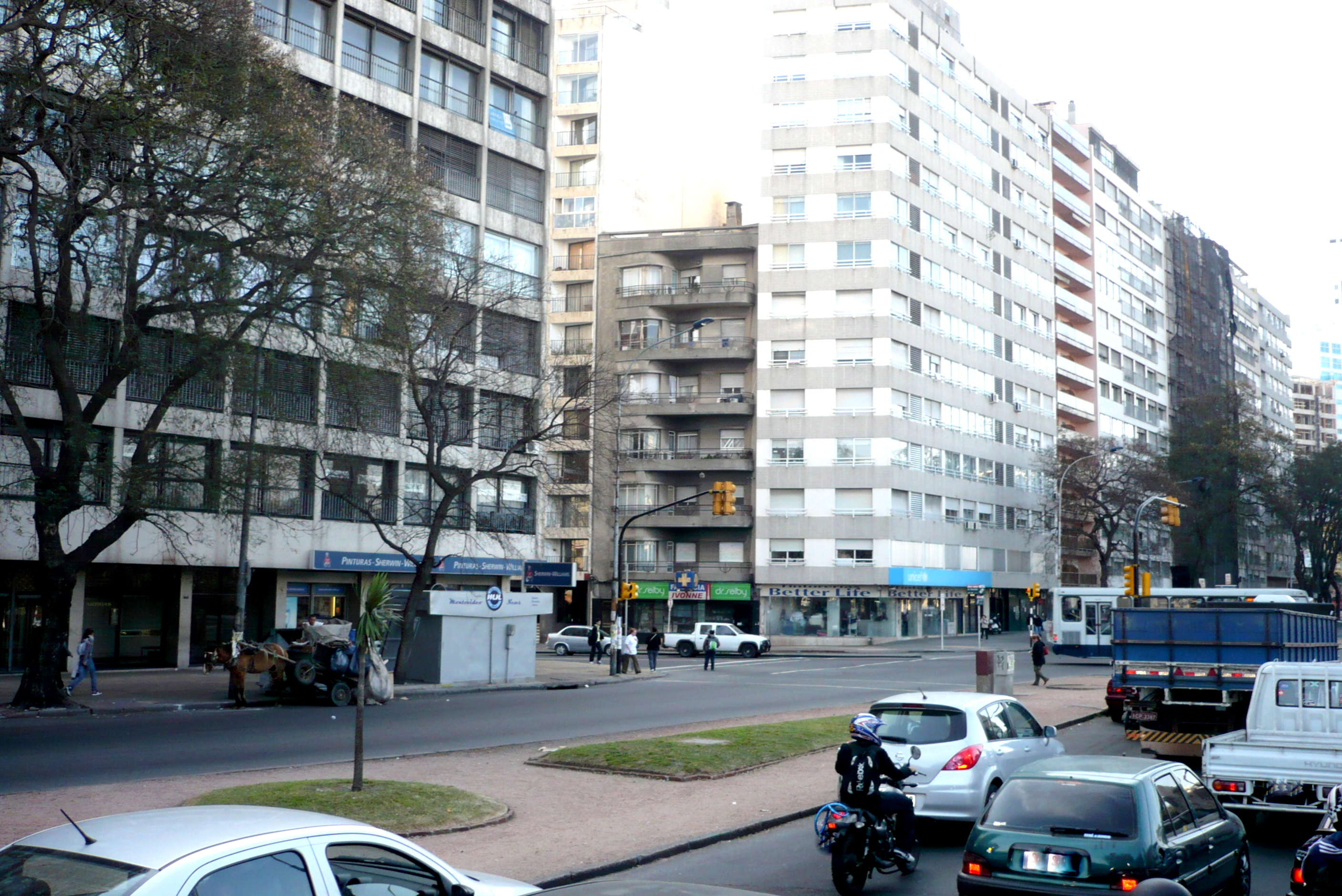
View of the boulevard at Cordón

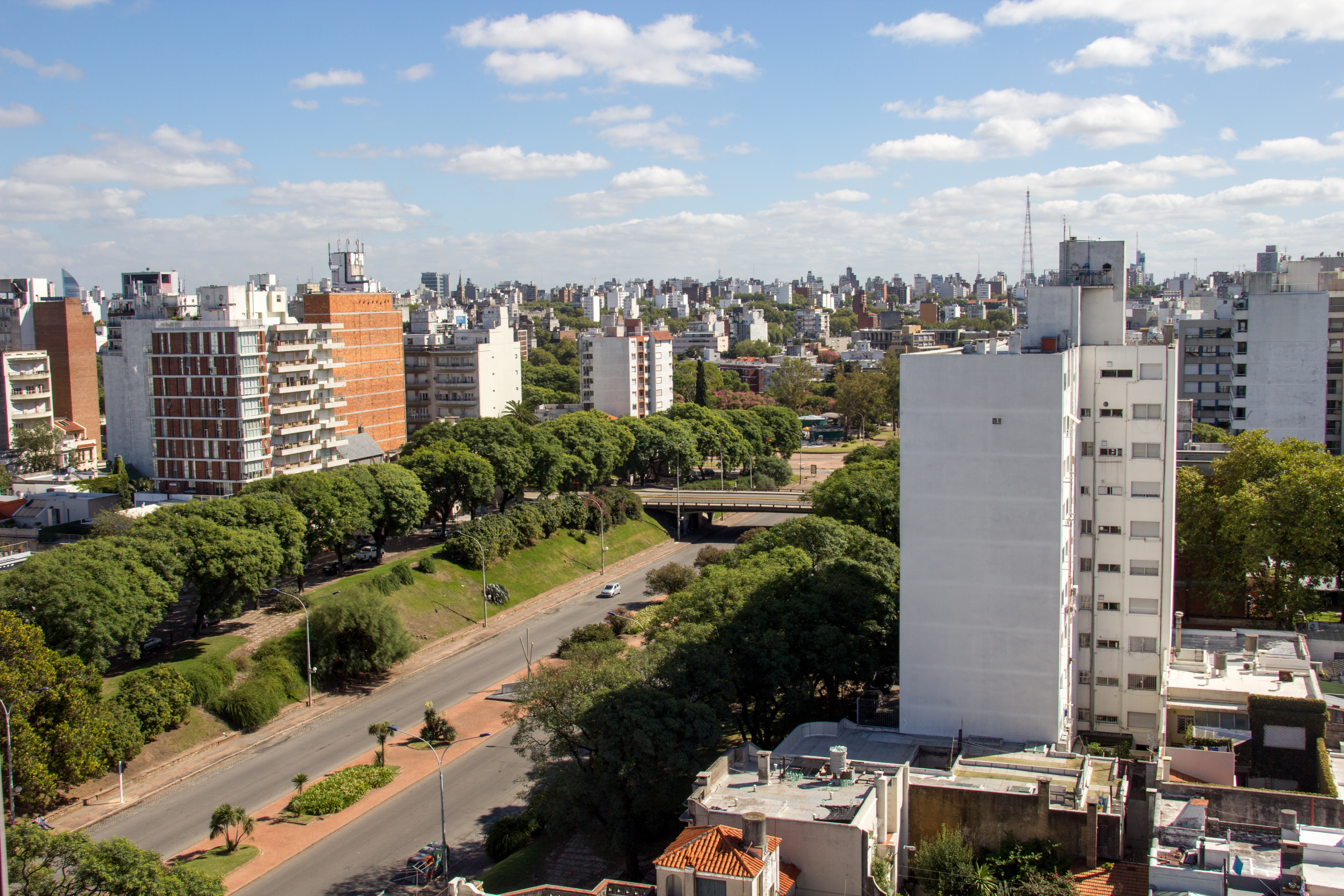
View of the Sarmiento Bridge from a building in Punta Carretas

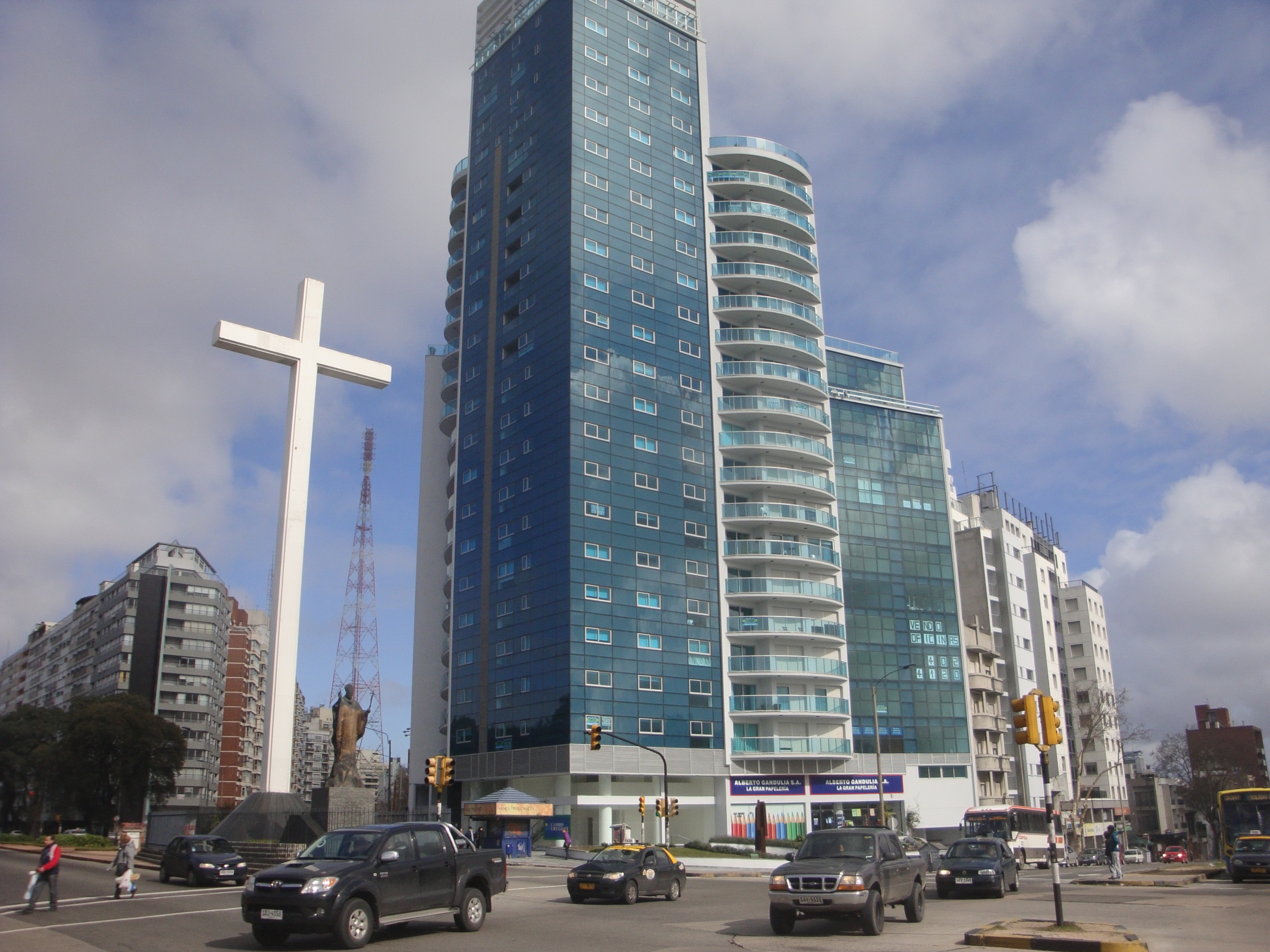
Cross and monument to Pope John Paul II in Tres Cruces

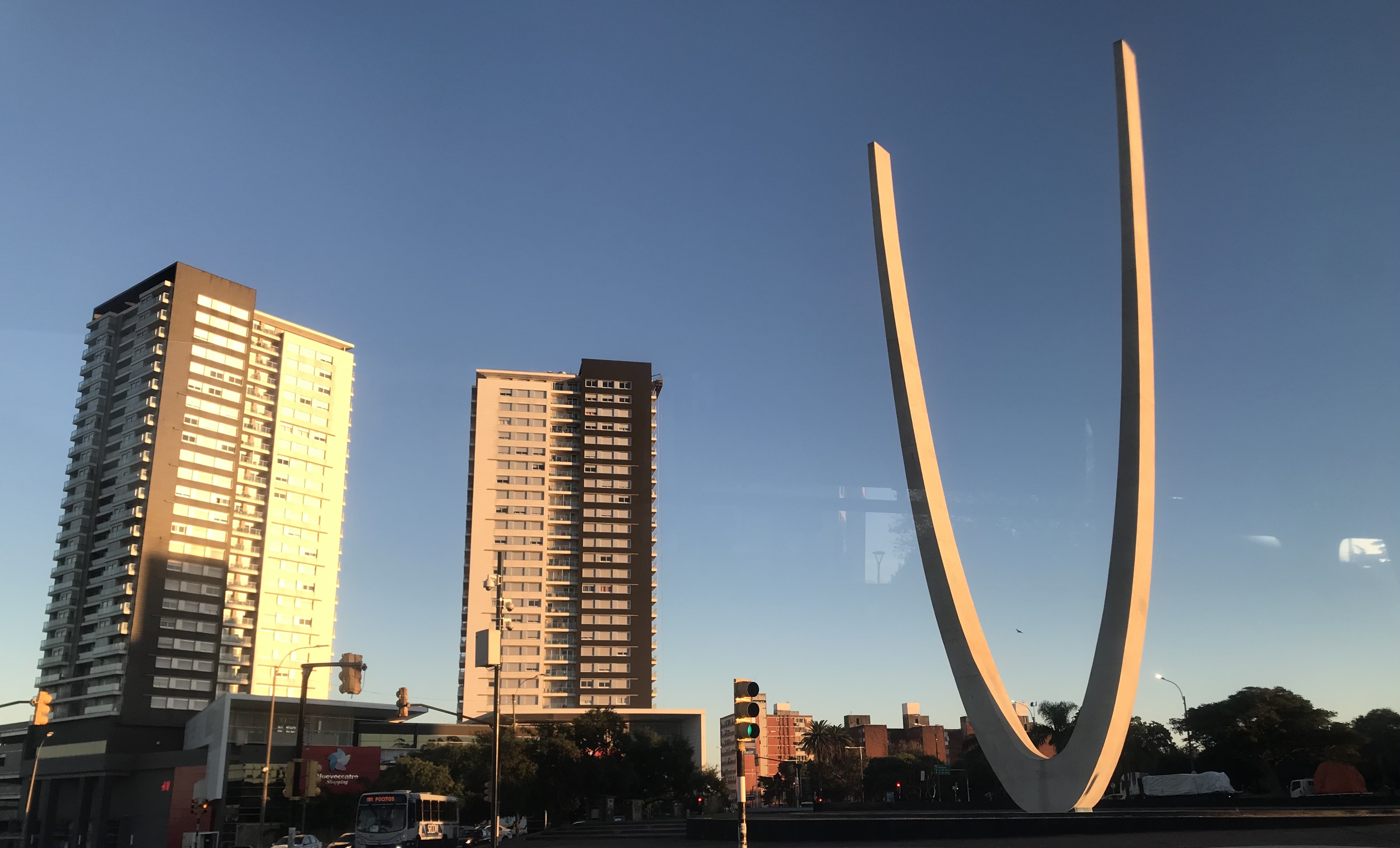
Monument to Luis Batlle Berres in Jacinto Vera, Montevideo

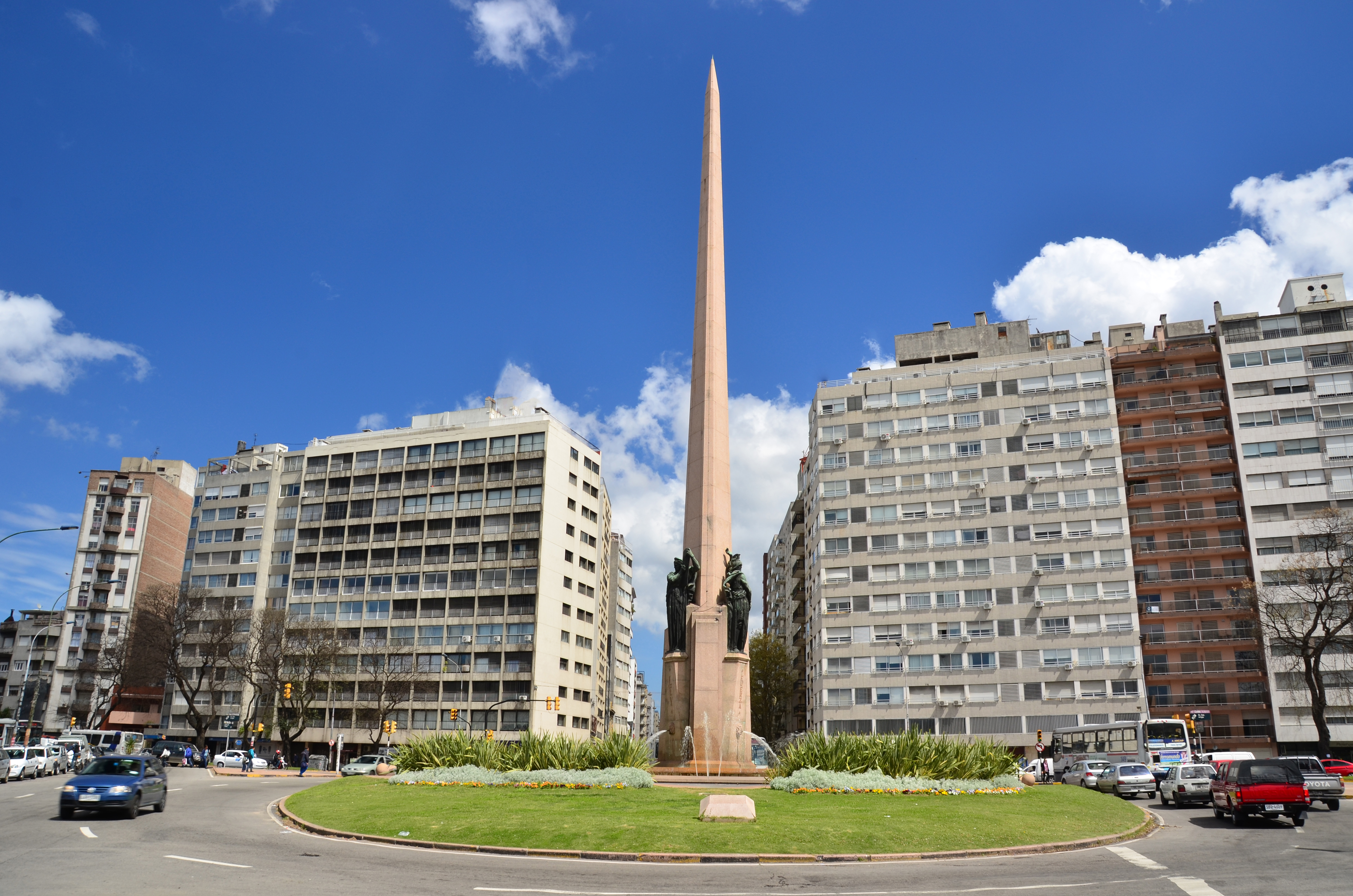
Obelisk of Montevideo
