= Central Hospital of the Armed Forces of Uruguay =

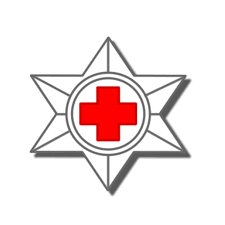

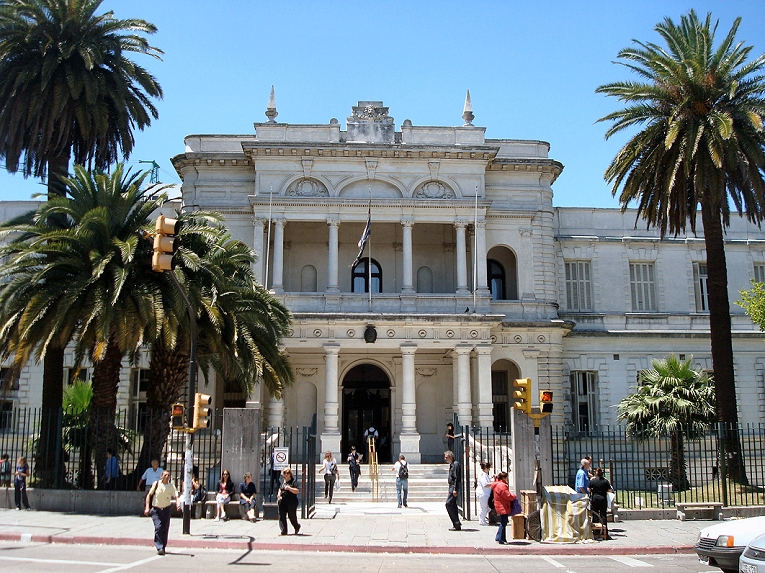

Geography
- Location: 3050 8 de Octubre Avenue, Montevideo, Uruguay

Organisation
- Type: General

History
- Founded: July 18, 1908; 117 years ago

Links
- Website: www.dnsffaa.gub.uy
- Lists: Hospitals in Uruguay

Central Hospital of the Armed Forces of Uruguay (Spanish: Hospital Central de las Fuerzas Armadas), colloquially referred to as The Military Hospital is a military medical center in Montevideo, Uruguay. It provides healthcare services to members of the Uruguayan Armed Forces and their immediate family members, as well as to the President of the Republic and Cabinet ministers.

== History ==
At the beginning of the 20th century, the Military Medical Corps of Uruguay underwent a process of institutional reorganisation. By executive decree dated 7 July 1904, the position of Surgeon General of the Army, which had existed since 1881, was replaced by that of Chief of Military Medical Services, and the Army Stretcher-Bearer Company was formally established. At that time, military officers received medical care in designated wards of the Hospital Maciel.

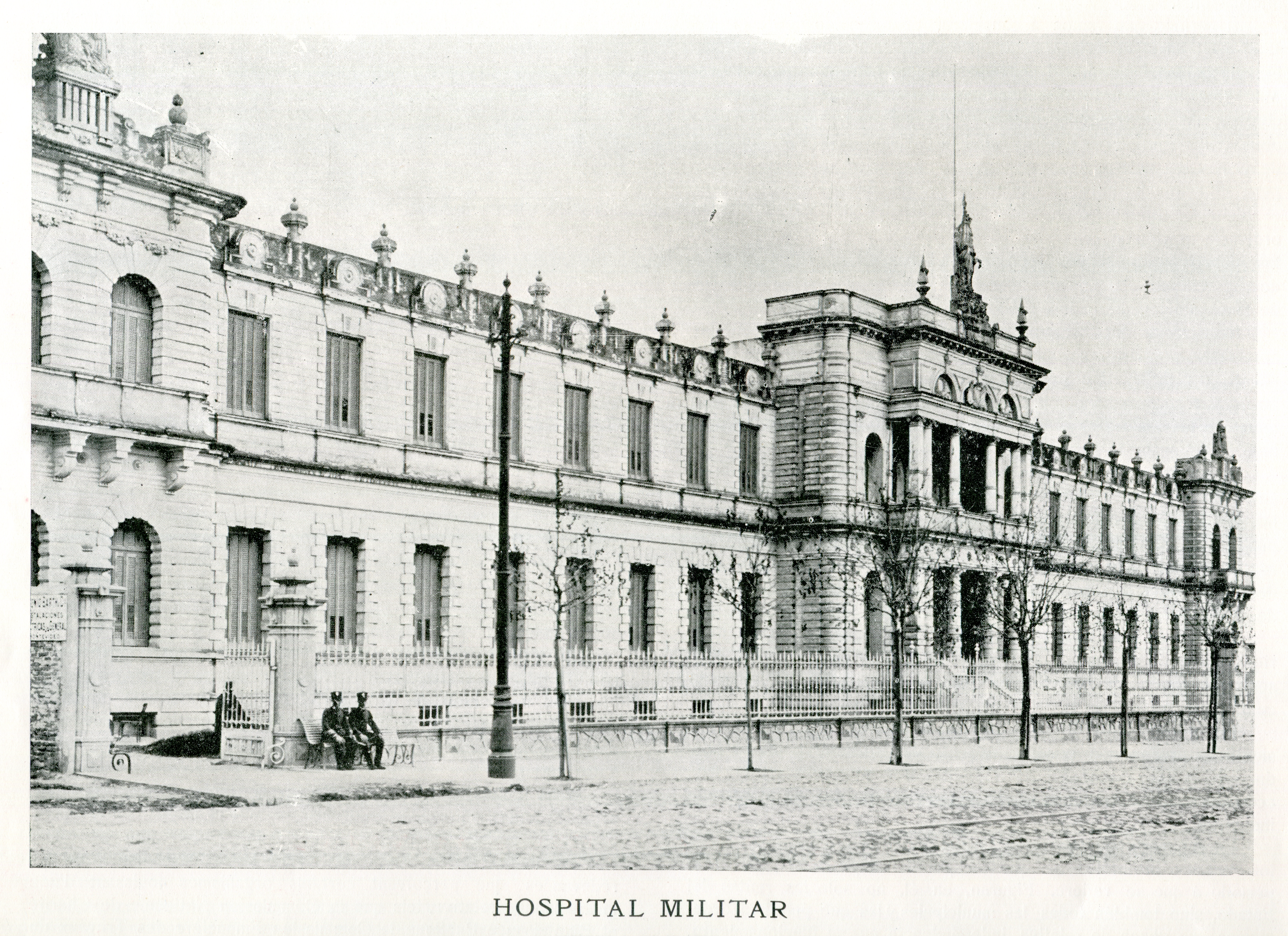
THe hospital's main building, 1908

In 1905, one year after the end of the Revolution of 1904, construction began on a dedicated Military Hospital. The hospital was officially placed at the disposal of the Military Medical Corps for both active-duty and retired personnel upon the inauguration of its current building on 18 July 1908, a date of symbolic significance marking the 78th anniversary of the swearing-in of Uruguay’s first Constitution. The facility was inaugurated by President Claudio Williman, and its first director was the surgeon Ricardo Vecino.

By 1918, the hospital’s infrastructure proved insufficient to meet growing demand, prompting the initiation of a series of structural expansions. In 1921, hospital care was extended to women and children of enlisted personnel, broadening the institution’s scope. The following year, 1922, a major expansion project was designed by architects and military officers Alfredo Baldomir and Alfredo Campos, aimed at increasing capacity and modernising the facilities.

In 1929, the widow and daughters of former president Feliciano Viera sold a parcel of land fronting 8 de Octubre Avenue to the State. The site subsequently housed the Military Medical Nursing School, which operated there until 1934. During World War II, the Military Hospital was one of the medical centres that provided treatment to wounded combatants from the Battle of the River Plate.
