= 8 de Octubre Avenue =

Street in Montevideo, Uruguay

Coordinates: 34.89103°S 56.16142°W

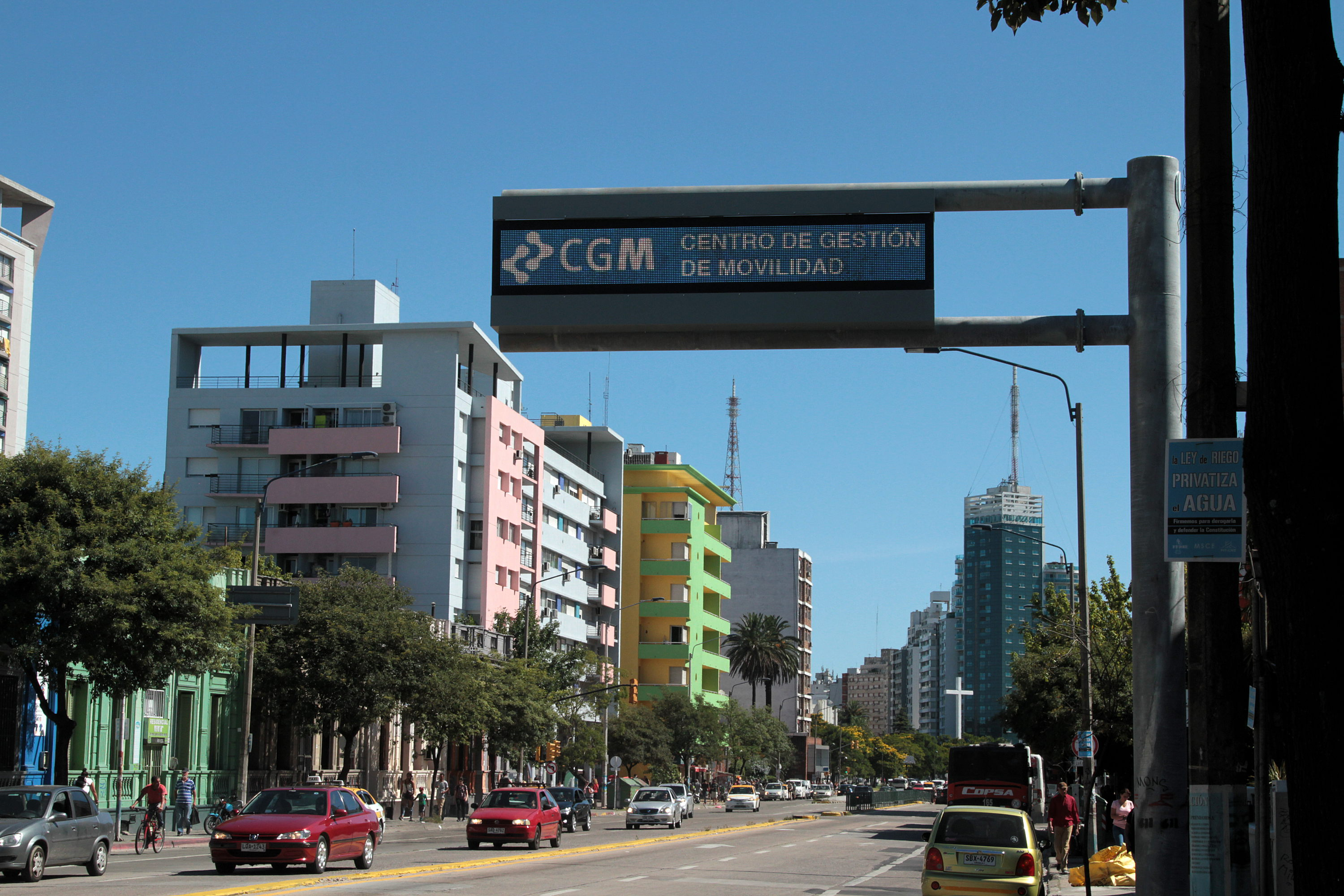
- 8 de Octubre Avenue

- 8 de Octubre Ave in Montevideo
- Native name: Avenida 8 de Octubre (Spanish)
- Location: Montevideo, Uruguay
- From: Tres Cruces
- To: Maroñas

Avenida 8 de Octubre is one of the main thoroughfares of Montevideo, Uruguay, extending 3.5 miles (5.6 km) from Tres Cruces at the intersection with 18 de Julio Avenue to Maroñas, where it turns into Camino Maldonado.

After extending for 250 m, it passes under Artigas Boulevard through a 300 m tunnel, and rises to the surface between Avelino Miranda and Presidente Batlle streets. Extended through La Blanqueada, Unión, and Maroñas, a large number of shops, public institutions, educational centers and hospitals are concentrated on this avenue.

== History ==
By decree of December 20, 1866, during the administration of Venancio Flores, it was named Camino 8 de Octubre. The name comes from the date on which the peace that ended the Uruguayan Civil War was signed, on October 8, 1851. In the 1860s, the paving of the road was carried out from the current Plaza del Gaucho to what was then Montevideo Street (current Pernas St.). The paving works finished on July 14, 1867.

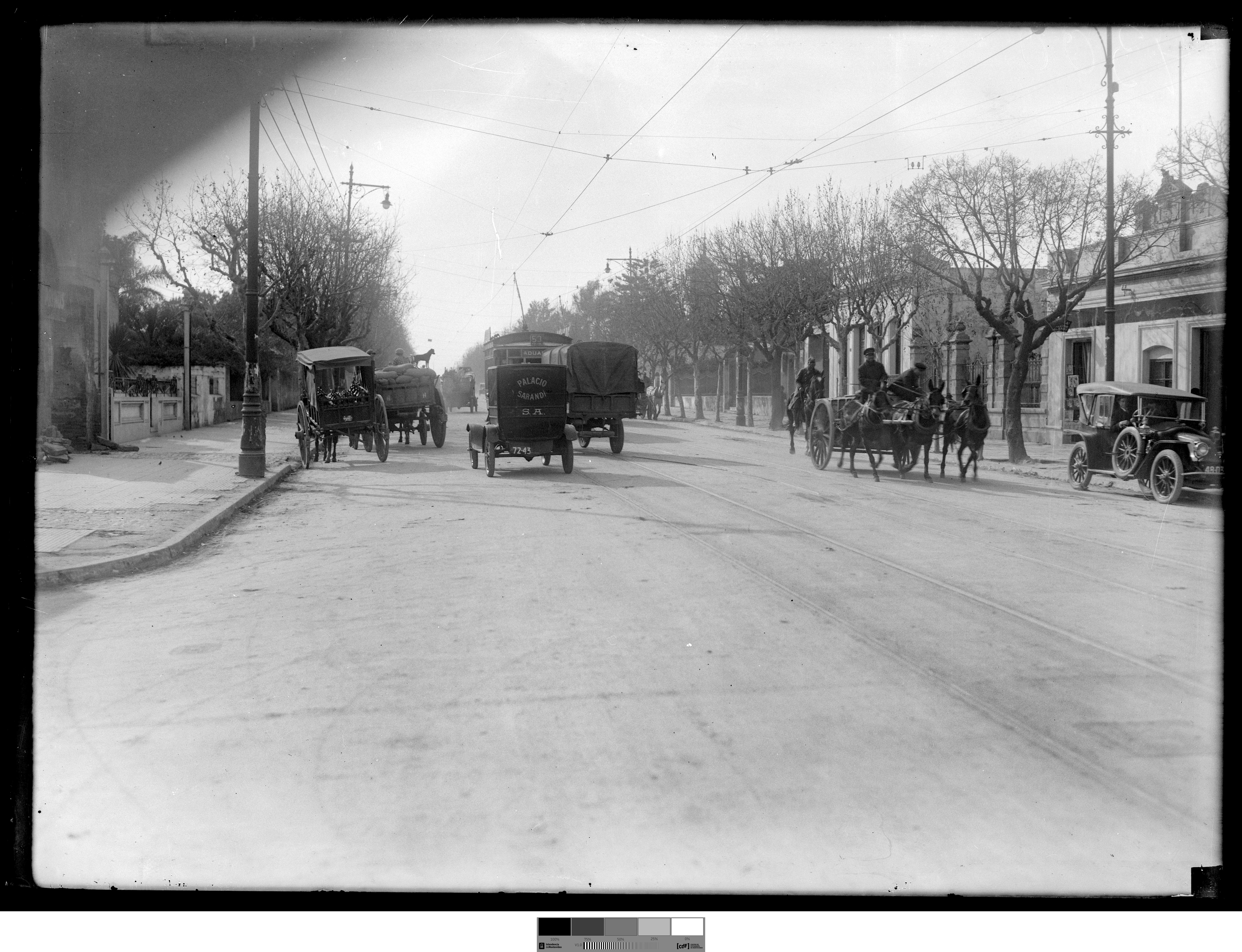
8 de Octubre Avenue in 1926

By decree of November 4, 1867, the section of the old Camino a Maldonado between El Gaucho and Tres Cruces that was known as Camino a La Unión, adopted the name of July 18, extending the main throughfare of Montevideo until it joined the October 8 road. In 1919, due to a modification in the layout of Avenida 18 de Julio, a sector of it was incorporated into 8 de Octubre Avenue, giving it its current extension. In 1925 the original cobblestone was replaced by concrete.

On July 18, 1961, the tunnel that passes under the Democracy Square and Artigas Boulevard was inaugurated.

== Landmarks ==
The main landmarks along this avenue are:

- Catholic University of Uruguay
- Médica Uruguaya Center
- Sanguinetti Primary School
- Geographic Military Institute

== Gallery ==
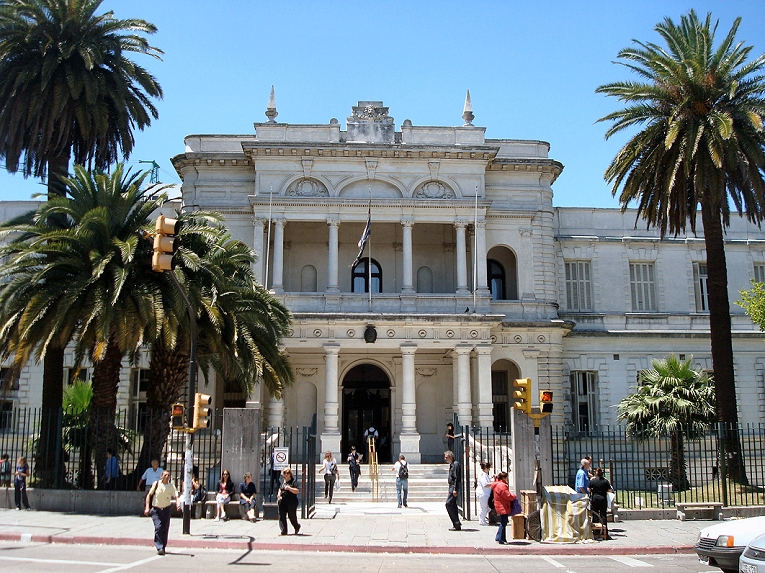
Central Hospital of the Armed Forces

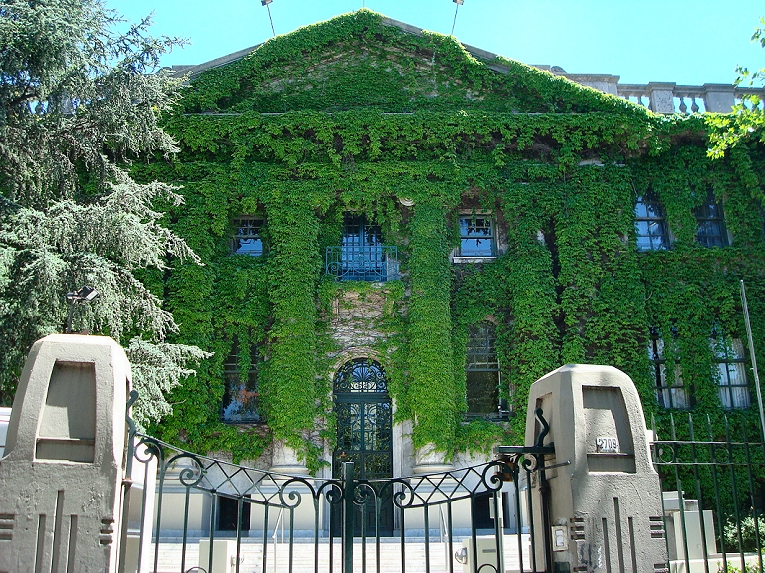
Crandon Institute

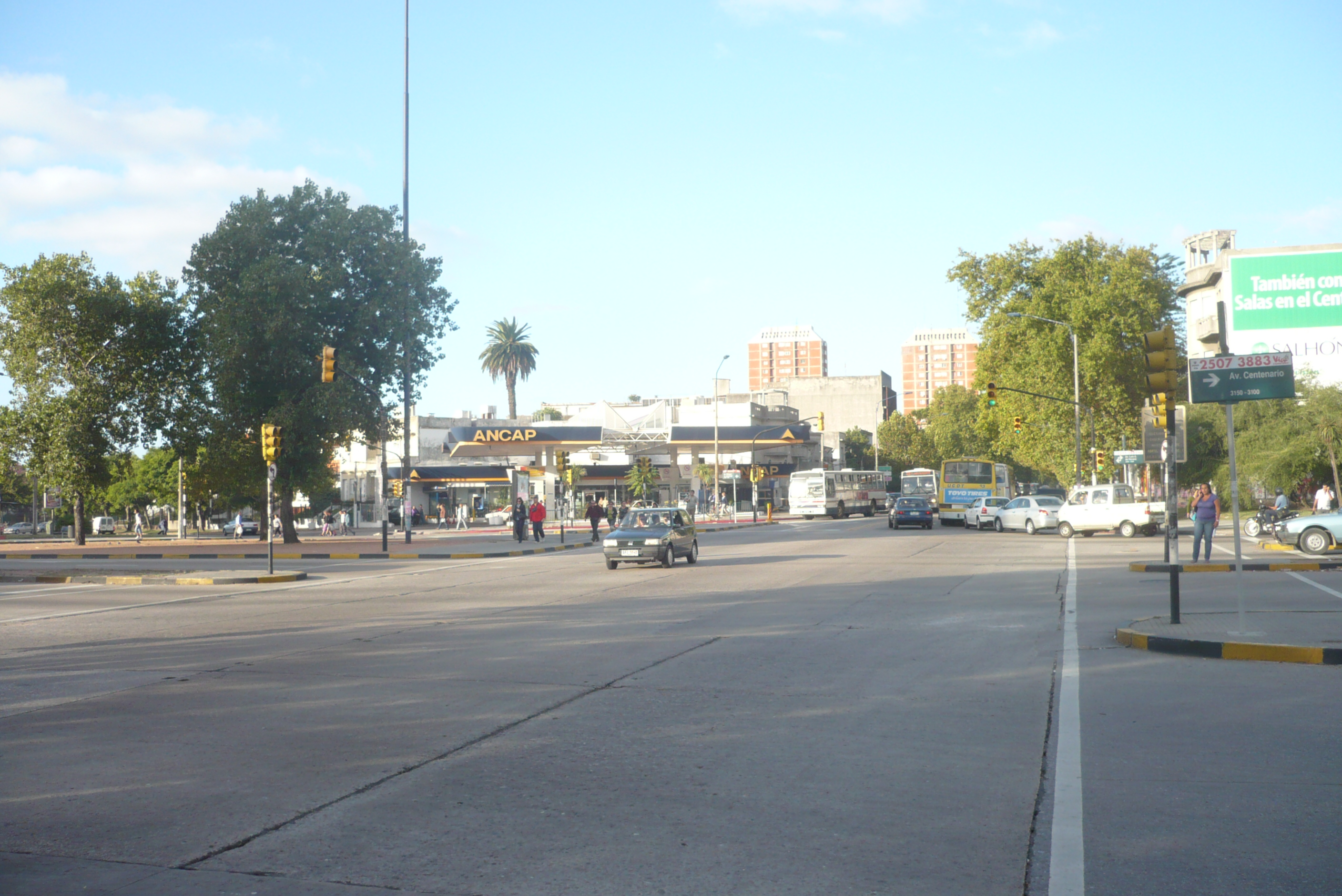
8 de Octubre Ave and Centenario Ave
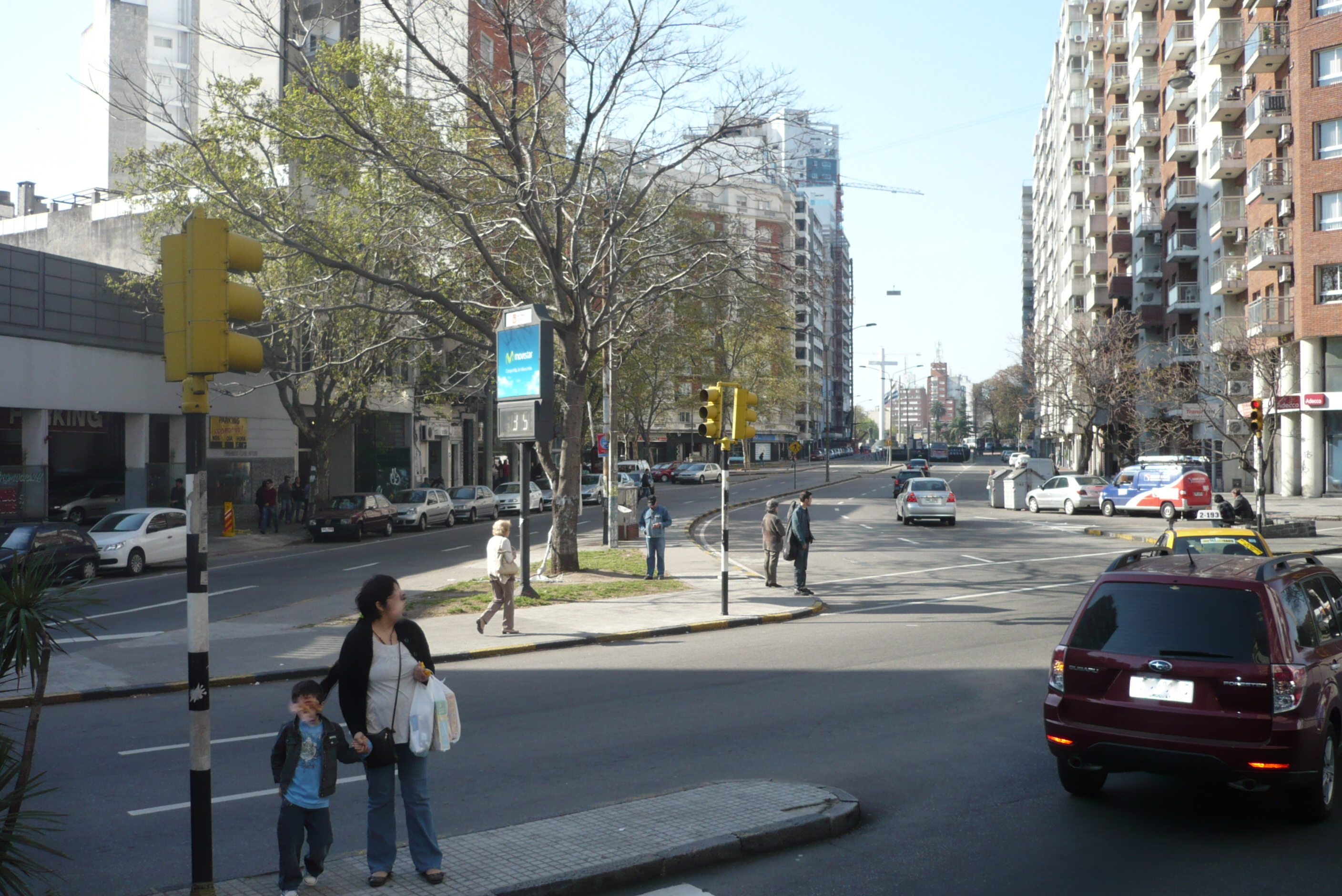
18 de Julio and 8 de Octubre Ave

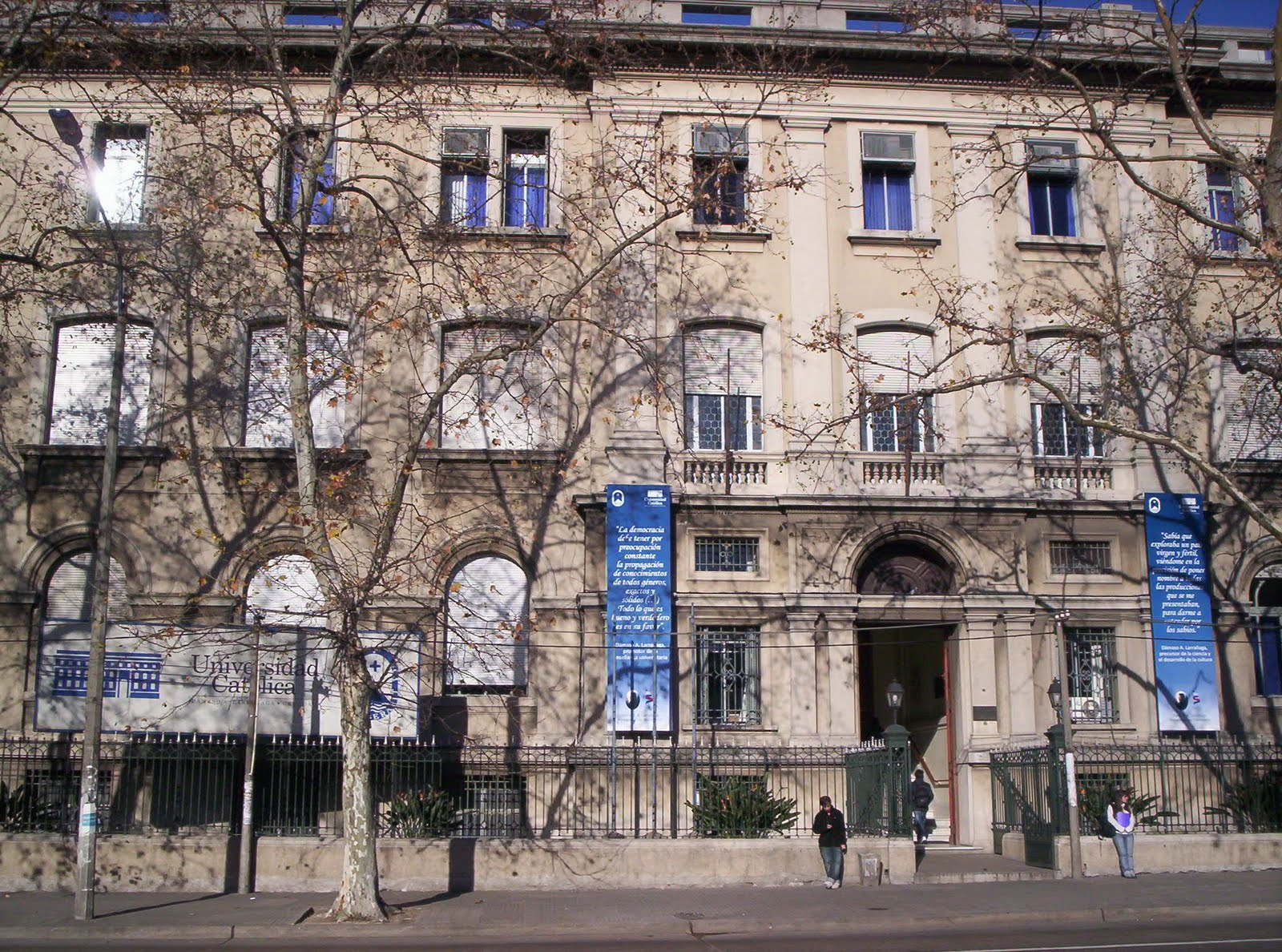
Catholic University of Uruguay

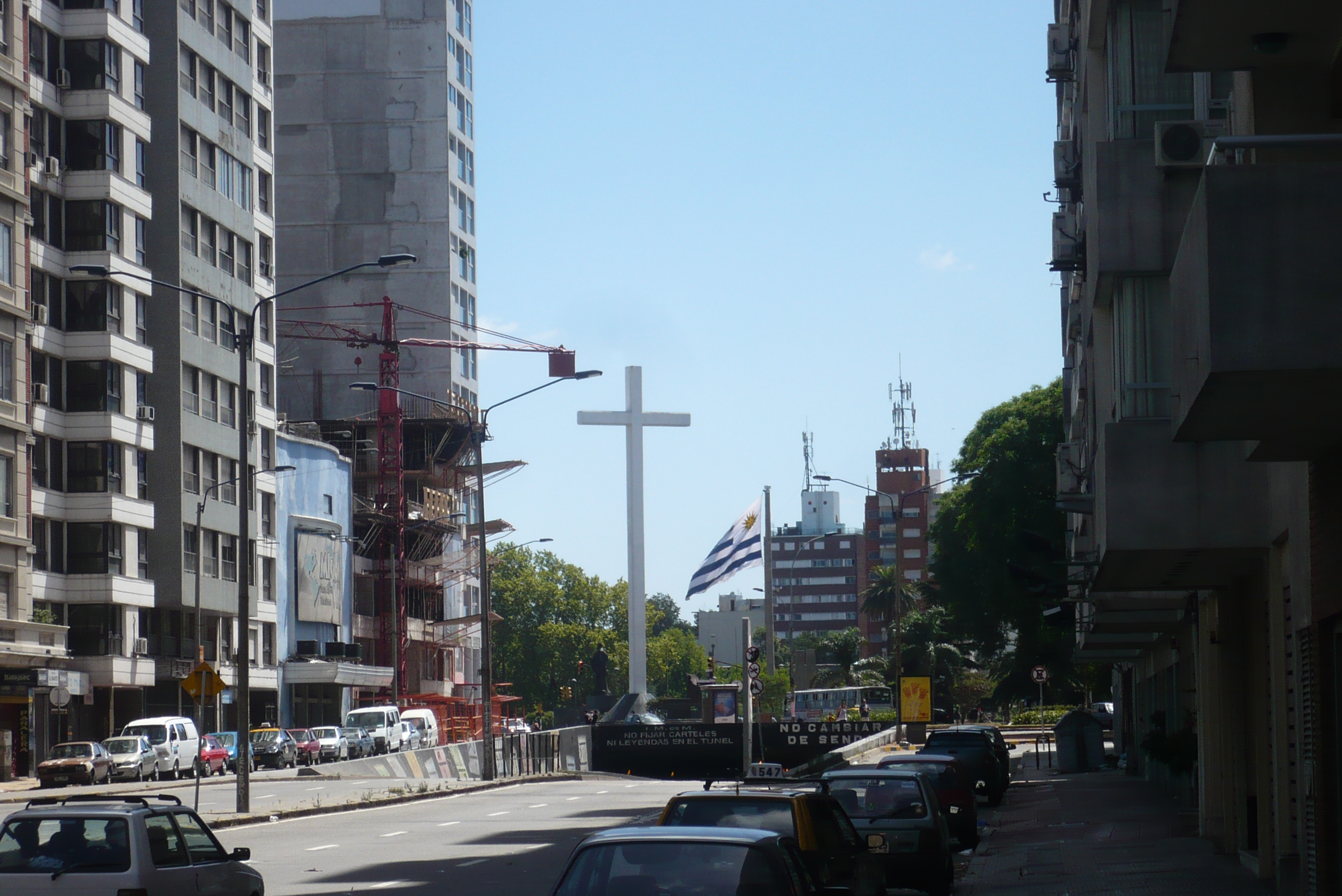
Democracy Square and underground tunnel
