= La Blanqueada =

- Barrio
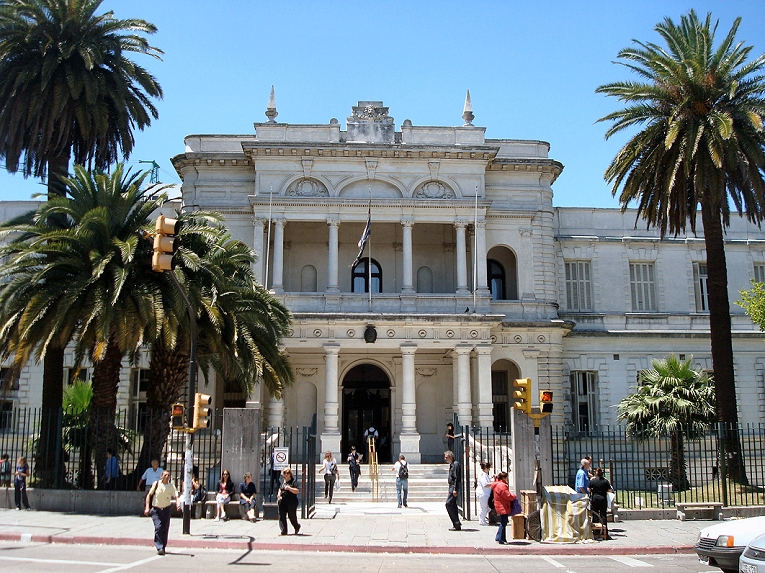
- The Military Hospital

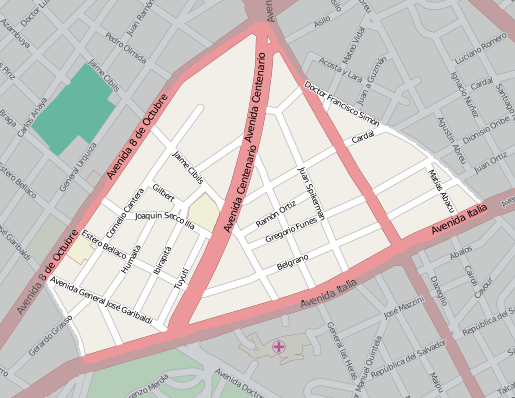
- Street map of La Blanqueada

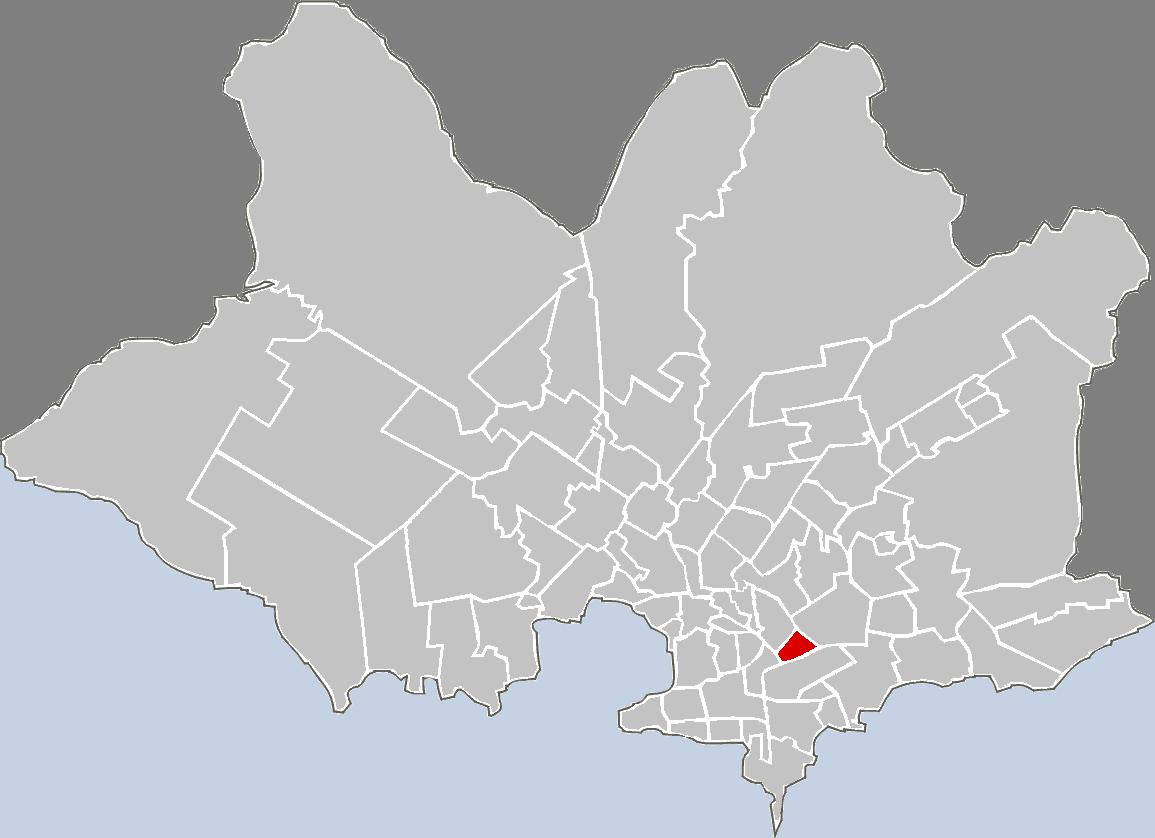
- Location of La Blanqueada in Montevideo
- Coordinates: 34°53′11″S 56°9′14″W
- Country: Uruguay
- Department: Montevideo Department
- City: Montevideo

La Blanqueada is a barrio (neighbourhood or district) in Uruguay's capital Montevideo. It borders Tres Cruces to the west, Larrañaga to the northwest, Unión to the northeast and Parque Batlle to the south. It is administratively divided between Municipalities CH and E of the Montevideo Department.

According to the historian Orestes Araújo, the name of this neighbourhood (derived from blanco, Spanish for "white") was given by an old grocery store all in white.

== Landmarks ==
- Central Hospital of the Armed Forces.
- Estadio Gran Parque Central

== Places of worship ==
- Church of Our Lady of Sorrows known also as the Parish Holy Land (Roman Catholic)
- Parish Church of Our Lady of the Assumption, known also as the Italian Catholic Mission (Roman Catholic, Scalabrinians)
- Nuestro Salvador, a small Lutheran Church, is also present on Avenida 8 de Octubre.

== See also ==
- Barrios of Montevideo
