= Tres Cruces =

- Barrio
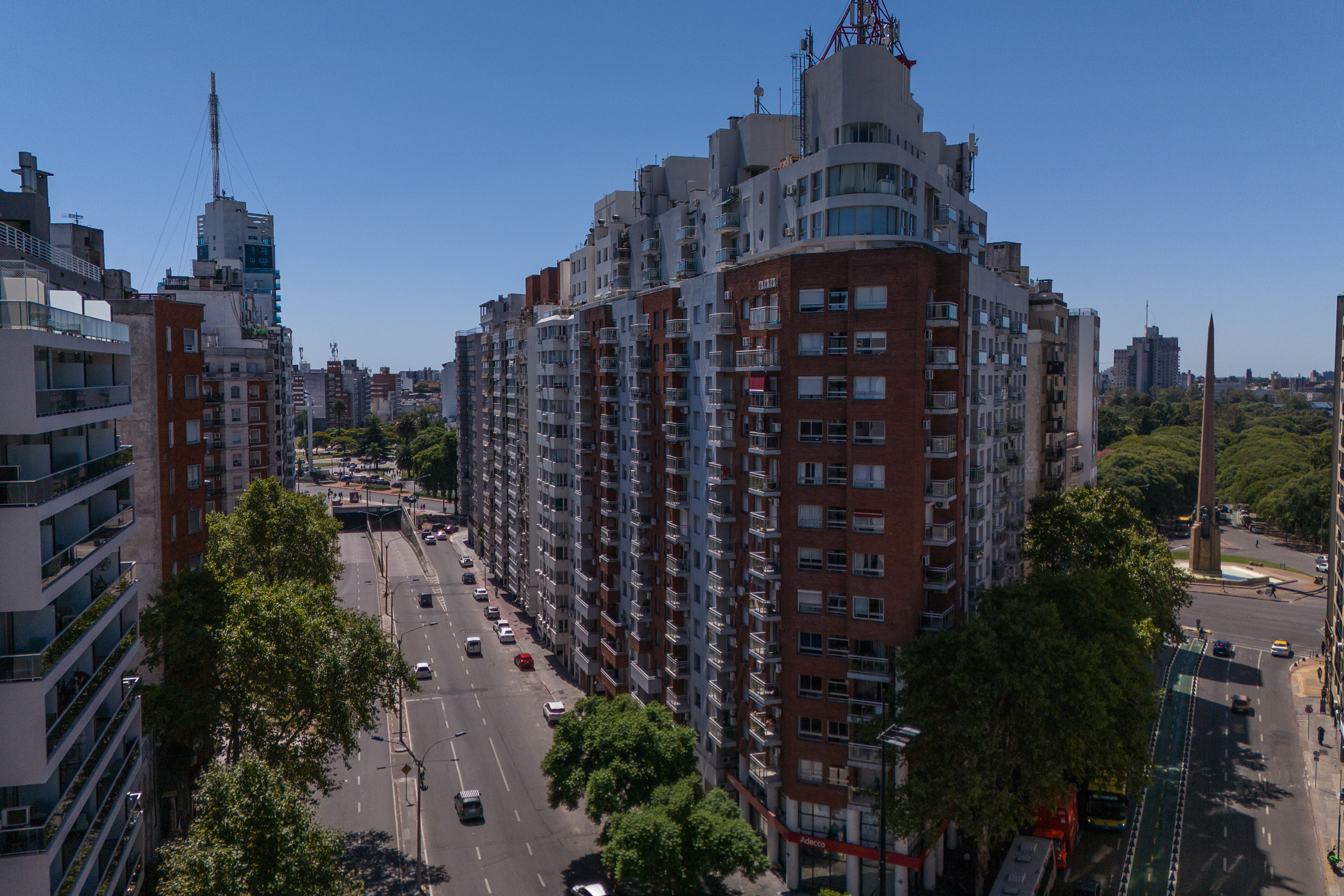
- Statue of Fructuoso Rivera, Tres Cruces

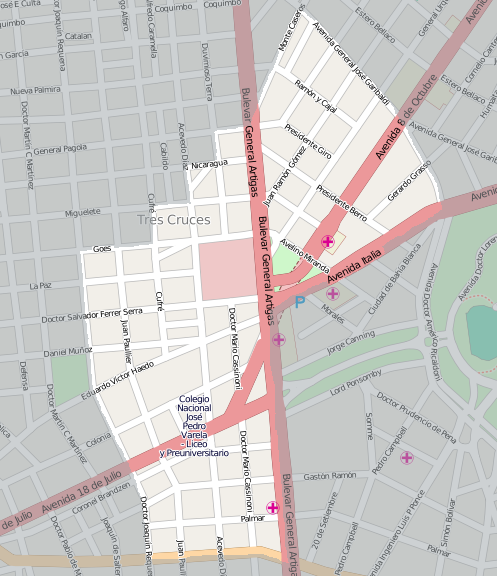
- Street map of Tres Cruces

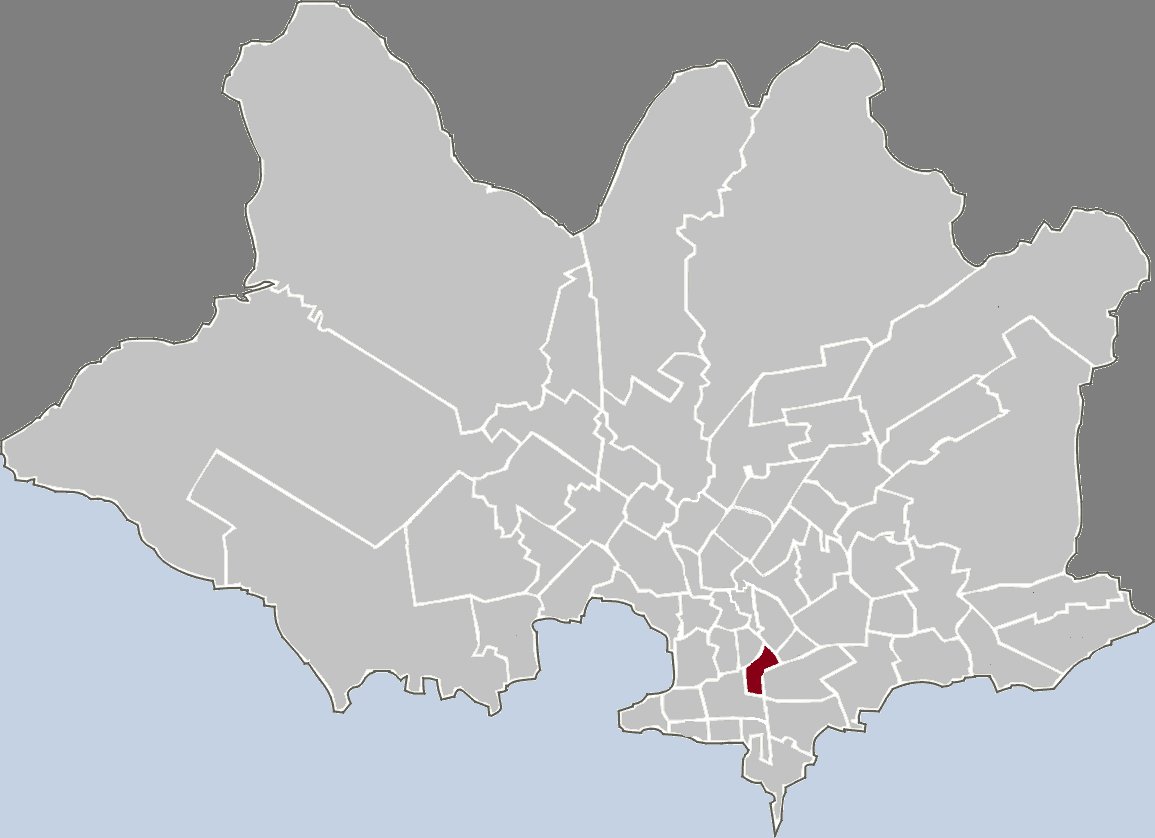
- Location of Tres Cruces in Montevideo
- Coordinates: 34°53′45″S 56°10′5″W
- Country: Uruguay
- Department: Montevideo Department
- City: Montevideo

Tres Cruces is a barrio (neighbourhood or district) of Uruguay's capital Montevideo. Its name means "three crossings", referring to the three major transportation routes which intersect in the area: Avenida 18 de Julio, Bulevar Artigas and Avenida 8 de Octubre. It is also the starting point of Italia Avenue.

== Location ==
Tres Cruces shares borders with Cordón to the south and to the west, with La Comercial and Larrañaga to the north, with La Blanqueada and Parque Batlle to the east, Cordón and Pocitos to the south.

== History ==
In 1813, the barrio was the site of the “Congress Tres Cruces” and the issuance of the "Instrucciones del año XIII" by José Gervasio Artigas in an attempt to establish an independent government for the Liga Federal in what was then known as the "Banda Oriental" ("Eastern Bank").

== Sites of interest ==
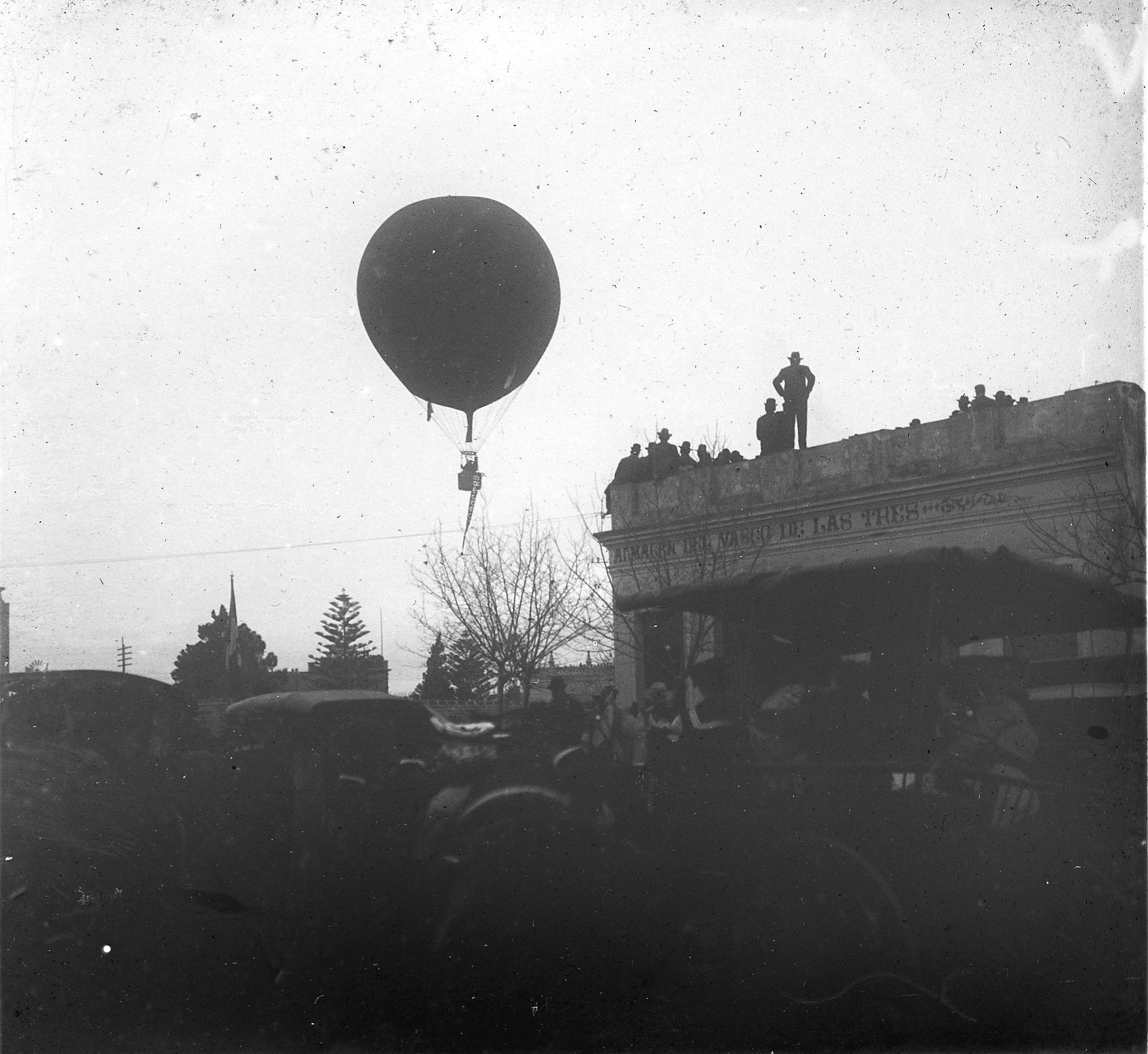
An early hot air balloon flight in 1904 watched by pedestrians with vehicles at Tres Cruces.

The barrio is the site of the national bus terminal, a major shopping centre, and several hospitals and schools. Several major monuments are also located here. One is an obelisk erected in 1930 to commemorate the centennial of Uruguay's 1830 constitution. A giant cross and statue of Pope John Paul II is located near the obelisk, erected to commemorate his first visit to Montevideo. Across from the bus terminal is the Democracy Square, a monument erected in honour of Fructuoso Rivera, the founder of the Uruguay Colorado Party and first President of Uruguay.

== Educational facilities ==
- Colegio y Liceo Santo Domingo, also known as "Las Domínicas", is a private institution operated by the Roman Catholic Dominican Sisters)

== Places of worship ==
- Shrine of the Resurrected Lord (Roman Catholic)
- Seventh-day Adventist Church (Adventist)

== See also ==
- Barrios of Montevideo
