= 1973 Uruguayan coup d'état =

June 1973 coup d'état in Uruguay

- Part of the Cold War in South America
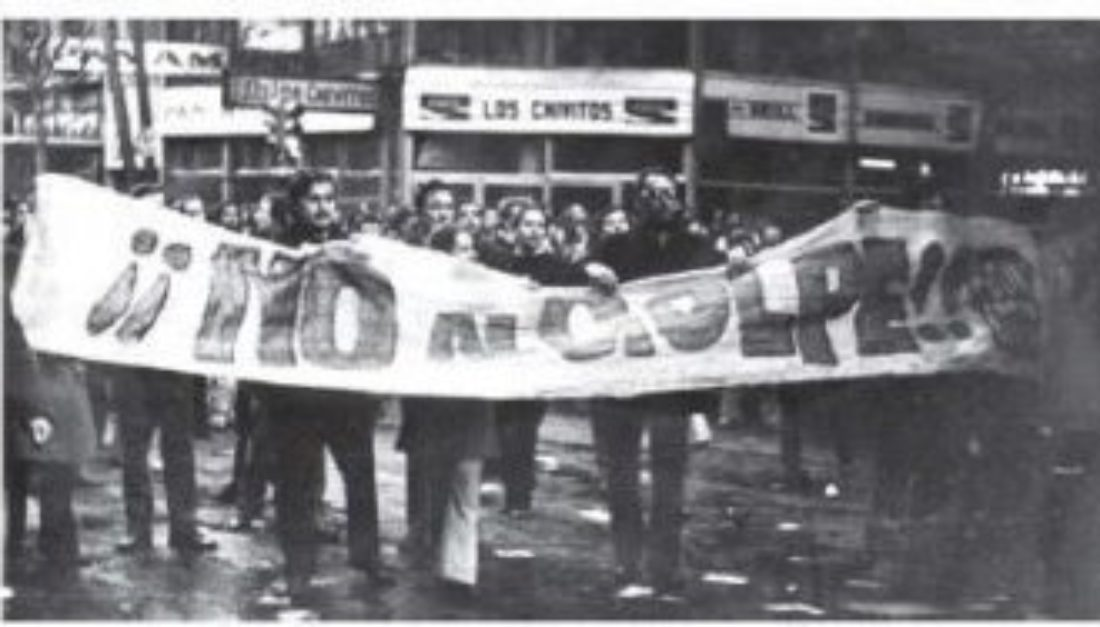
- Protesters marching against the dictatorship in 1973
Date	27 June 1973
Location	Montevideo, Uruguay
Result	Coup successful: Dissolution of General Assembly of Uruguay; Juan María Bordaberry becomes President and dictator; Civic-military dictatorship of Uruguay assumed power

Belligerents
Uruguayan Government; Uruguayan Armed Forces; National Army of Uruguay; National Navy of Uruguay; Uruguayan Air Force; National Police of Uruguay	Broad Front; Tupamaros; National Confederation of Workers (CNT); Supported by: Cuba

Commanders and leaders
(Uruguay) Juan María Bordaberry (Uruguay) Néstor Bolentini (Uruguay) Antonio Francese (Uruguay) Walter Ravenna	Líber Seregni; Raúl Sendic; Eleuterio Fernández; Héctor Amodio Pérez; Henry Engler; Mauricio Rosencof

The 1973 Uruguayan coup d'état took place in Uruguay on 27 June 1973 and marked the beginning of the civic-military dictatorship which lasted until 1985.

President Juan María Bordaberry closed parliament and ruled with the assistance of a junta of military generals. The official reason was to crush the Tupamaros, a Marxist urban guerrilla movement. The communist trade union federations called a general strike and occupation of factories. The strike lasted just over two weeks. It ended with most of the trade union leaders in jail, dead, or exiled to Argentina. As part of the coup all associations including trade unions were declared illegal and banned; the Constitution of Uruguay of 1967 was practically voided.

== Antecedents ==
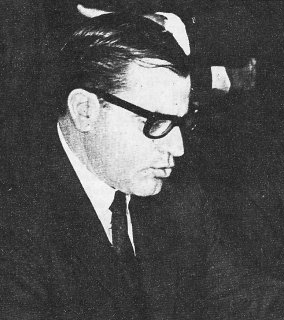
Elected democratically in 1971, Bordaberry dissolved the parliament in 1973, instituting a civil-military dictatorship.

On September 9, 1971, President Jorge Pacheco Areco instructed the armed forces to conduct anti-guerrilla operations against the Movimiento de Liberación Nacional-Tupamaros. On December 16, a Junta of Commanders in Chief and of the Estado Mayor Conjunto (Esmaco) (Joint Chiefs) of the Armed Forces was created. Following the presidential elections of November 1971 a new government took office on 1 March 1972 led by Juan María Bordaberry. The role of the Armed Forces in political life continued to increase with training and support from the United States. On October 31, 1972, Defense Minister Augusto Legnani, had to resign for failing to remove a chief in charge of a mission of great importance for the ministry. Subsequently, military commanders made public statements indicting the President of the Republic.

On February 8, 1973, in order to control the buildup of military pressure, President Bordaberry replaced the Minister of National Defence, Armando Malet, with retired general Antonio Francese. On the following day, the new minister met with the commanders of the three forces and only found support in the Navy.

At eight o'clock of the same evening, the commanders of the Army and the Air Forces announced from state television they would disavow any orders by Francese and demanded that Bordaberry sack him. At 10:30 pm Bordaberry announced from the (private) Canal 4 that he would keep Francese in the Ministry and called on the citizens to gather in Plaza Independencia, in front of Government House (Casa de Gobierno).

In the early hours of the morning of February 9, Uruguayan Marines barricaded the entrance towards the Ciudad Vieja of Montevideo. In response, the Army pulled M113 armored personnel carriers and M24 Chaffee light tanks into the streets and occupied various radio stations, from which they exhorted the members of the Navy to join their initiatives (or propositions).

Decree (Comunicado) No. 4 was issued, signed only by the commanders of the Army and Air Force, in which they proposed to achieve or promote socio-economic objectives, such as encouraging exports, reorganizing the foreign service (the subject of the Ministry of Foreign Affairs), eliminating the oppressive foreign debt, eradicating unemployment, attacking economic crime and corruption, reorganizing public administration and the tax system, and redistributing the land.

On Saturday 10 February, three ministers sought a rapprochement with the positions of the rebel commanders, so that the president would retain his position. At night, the commanders of the Army and Air Force issued a new Decree No. 7, that modified the previous statement. Several officers of the Navy ignored the command of Vice Admiral Juan José Zorrilla and supported the statements of the Army and Air Force. The next day, February 11, Zorrilla resigned from the Navy Command, while Captain Conrad Olazaba assumed this position, so that this force also abandoned its constitutional position.

On Monday February 12, Bordaberry went to the "Cap. Juan Manuel Boiso Lanza" base and accepted all the demands of the military commanders and negotiated his continuation in the presidency, in what became known as the Pacto de Boiso Lanza. This "agreement" entrusted to the Armed Forces the mission of providing security for national development and established forms of military involvement in political-administrative matters. It resulted in the creation of the National Security Council (Consejo de Seguridad Nacional) (COSENA), an advisory body to the Executive Power, subsequently established by Decree No. 163/973 of 23 February 1973.

The day after the agreement, Néstor Bolentini was appointed as Minister of Interior and Walter Ravenna as Minister of National Defense. This completed the slide into a civil-military government, which was formally ruled by civilians, but in fact the center of power had moved into the orbit of the military. It is considered that this episode amounted to a coup in fact.

== Events ==
On 27 June 1973, arguing that "the criminal act of conspiracy against the country, in tune with the complacency of politicians with no national sentiment, is inserted into the institutions, so as to present formally disguised as a legal activity", Bordaberry dissolved the legislature with the support of the Armed Forces, created a State Council with legislative, constitutional and administrative functions, restricted freedom of thought and empowered the armed forces and the police to ensure the uninterrupted provision of public services.

In a speech broadcast on radio and television on the same day of the coup, Bordaberry said:

I affirm today, once again, in circumstances of extreme importance to national life, our deep commitment to democracy and our unreserved commitment to a system of political and social organization governing the coexistence of Uruguayans. And together with this, the rejection of any ideology of Marxist origin attempting to exploit the generosity of our democracy, to appear as a doctrine of salvation and end as a tool of totalitarian oppression.

This step that we had to take, does not lead to and will not limit the freedoms or rights of the human person.

We ourselves are here for this and for its surveillance; for this, furthermore, we have committed these functions to the State Council and beyond, and still above all, are the Uruguayan people who have never permitted their freedoms to be trampled (...).

In response to the coup d'etat, on the same morning that the coup was brewing, the secretary of the CNT (National Confederation of Workers) began a general strike, which lasted 15 days.

== The decrees ==
Decree N° 464/973 of June 27, 1973, bears the signature of Bordaberry and his ministers Néstor Bolentini and Walter Ravenna. It expressed the following:

The President of the Republic decrees:

1° The Chambers of Senators and of Representatives are hereby declared dissolved.

2° Hereby is established a Council of State consisting of members that may be designated, with the following powers:

A) Perform the specific functions of the General Assembly independently;

B) Control the demarches of the Executive Power regarding the respect of individual rights and the submission of that Power to the constitutional and legal norms;

C) Develop a draft Constitutional Reform that reaffirms the fundamental principles of democracy and representatives to be duly acclaimed by the Electoral Body Elaborar.

3° It is prohibited to disclose by the press orally, written or televised, any kind of information, comments or recording, which directly or indirectly, indicate or refer to the provisions of this Decree, attributing dictatorial intentions to the Executive Power.

4° The armed forces and police are empowered to take the necessary measures to ensure the continued provision of essential public services.

Also, by Decree No. 465/973 of the same date, it is considered included within the text of Article 1 of Decree 464/973 "to all the Departmental Boards of the Country (art. 1º), the formation in each Departamento of a Board of Neighbours (Junta de Vecinos), that, where relevant, and at the Departmental level, will have powers similar to those granted to the State Council created by the art. 2 of the decree today" (art. 2º).

== See also ==
- Civic-military dictatorship of Uruguay
- Operation Condor
- Tupamaro National Liberation Movement
- 1973 Chilean coup d'état
