= Left-wing terrorism =

Terrorism motivated by far-left ideologies

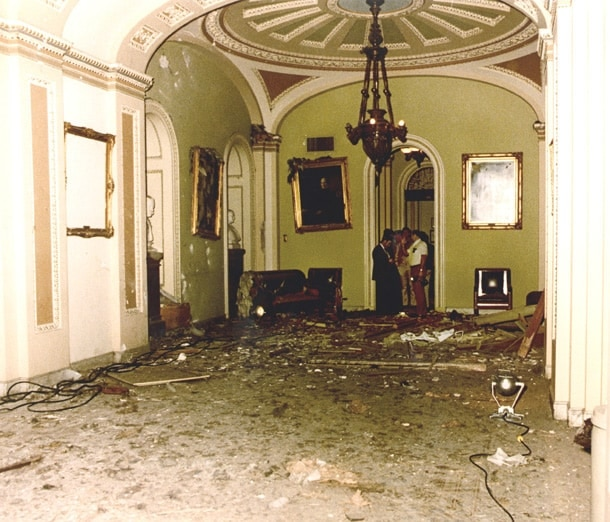
Damage from the bombing outside of the Chamber of the United States Senate on November 7, 1983, by the May 19th Communist Organization. The bombing was a retaliation hit against U.S. military involvement in Lebanon and Grenada.

Left-wing terrorism is a form of terrorist political violence motivated by far-left ideologies, committed with the aim of overthrowing current capitalist systems and replacing them with communist, Marxist, anarchist or socialist societies. Left-wing terrorism can also occur within already socialist states as criminal action against the current ruling government.

== Ideology ==
Left-wing terrorist groups and individuals have been influenced by various anarchist, communist and socialist currents, including Marxism (and further, Marxism–Leninism and Maoism). Narodnaya Volya, a 19th-century revolutionary socialist political organization and a left-wing terrorist group which operated inside the Russian Empire, killed Tsar Alexander II of Russia in 1881 and developed the concept of "propaganda of the deed", is considered a major influence on left-wing terrorists.

According to Sarah Brockhoff, Tim Krieger, and Daniel Meierrieks, while left-wing terrorism is ideologically motivated, nationalist-separatist terrorism is ethnically motivated. They argue that the revolutionary goal of left-wing terrorism is non-negotiable whereas nationalist terrorists are willing to make concessions. They suggest that the rigidity of the demands of left-wing terrorists may explain their lack of support relative to nationalist groups. Nevertheless, many on the revolutionary left have shown solidarity for national liberation groups employing terrorism, such as Irish nationalists, the Palestine Liberation Organization (PLO), and the Tupamaros in Uruguay, seeing them as engaged in a global struggle against capitalism. Since the nationalist sentiment is fueled by socio-economic conditions, some separatist movements, including the Basque ETA, the Provisional Irish Republican Army, and the Irish National Liberation Army, incorporated communist and socialist ideologies into their policies.

David Brannan writes that left-wing terrorists and insurgents do not tend to engage in indiscriminate attacks on the public because doing so not only runs contrary to their socialist ideals of being the protectors of the working class, which they espouse, they also do not want to alienate large swaths of the working population, because such organizations and individuals seek to gain their support. Left-wing violent groups can be supported or constrained by an ideologically aligned radical milieu through moral and legal aid. Other researchers argue that left-wing terrorism may not be less indiscriminate than its right-wing counterpart.

== History ==
Left-wing terrorism has its roots in 19th and early 20th-century anarchist terrorism, and became pronounced during the Cold War following the aftermath of World War II. Modern left-wing terrorism developed in the context of the political unrest of 1968. According to David C. Rapoport, Professor Emeritus of Political Science at University of California, Los Angeles (UCLA), the modern wave of left-wing terrorism began with the hijacking of the El Al Flight 426, operated by a Boeing 707-458C en route from London to Tel Aviv via Rome, committed by three members of the Popular Front for the Liberation of Palestine (PFLP) in 1968.

In Western Europe, notable groups included the West German Red Army Faction (RAF), the Italian Red Brigades (BR), the Greek Revolutionary Organization 17 November (17N), the French action directe (AD) and the Belgian Communist Combatant Cells (CCC). Asian groups have included the Japanese Red Army and the Liberation Tigers of Tamil Eelam, although the latter organization later adopted nationalist terrorism. In Latin America, groups that became actively involved in terrorism in the 1970s and 1980s included the Nicaraguan Sandinistas, the Peruvian Shining Path, the Uruguayan Tupamaros, and the Colombian 19th of April Movement.

The majority of left-wing terrorist groups originated in the aftermath of World War II and they were predominantly active during the Cold War. Most left-wing terrorist groups that had operated in the 1970s and 1980s disappeared by the mid-1990s.

A 2014 paper by Kis-Katos et al. concluded that left-wing terrorism was the most prevalent terrorism in the past but has largely declined in the present day.

Studies in the United States have indicated a potential rise in left-wing terrorism in 2025.

In Latin American countries, Stefan M. Aubrey describes the Sandinistas, Shining Path, 19th of April Movement, and Revolutionary Armed Forces of Colombia (FARC) as the main organizations involved in left-wing terrorism during the 1970s and 1980s. These organizations opposed United States involvement in Latin America and drew local support as well as receiving support from the Soviet Union and Cuba.

=== Americas ===
==== United States ====
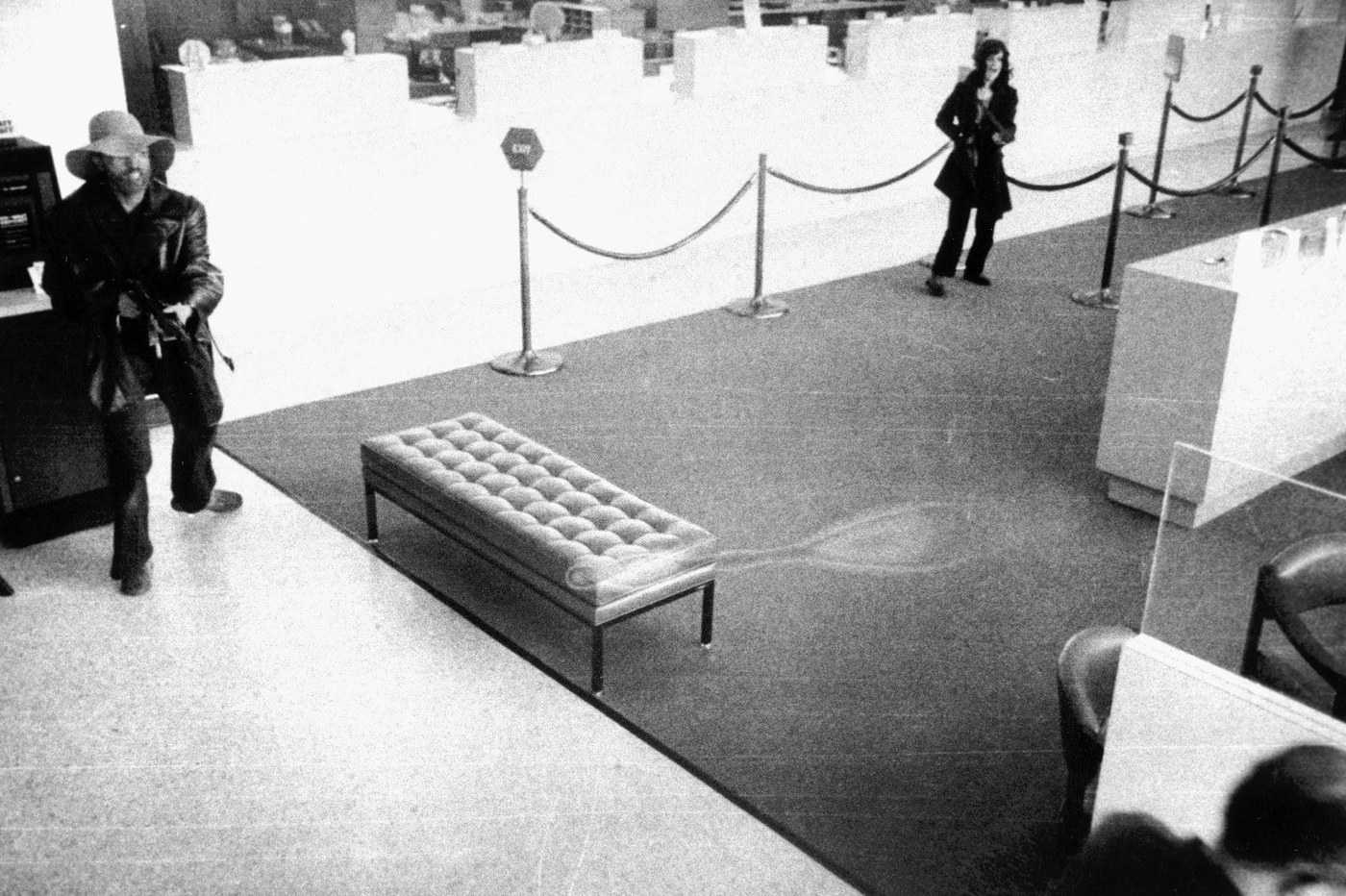
Patty Hearst robbing the Hibernia Bank in San Francisco, April 15, 1974 after being kidnapped by the Symbionese Liberation Army

The Weather Underground was a domestic terrorist group that developed as "a small, violent offshoot of Students for a Democratic Society", a group that originated in the 1960s to advocate for social change. Between 1973 and 1975, the Symbionese Liberation Army was active, committing bank robberies, murders, and other acts of violence. Other terrorist groups such as the small New World Liberation Front resorted to death threats, drive-by shootings and planting of pipe-bombs in the late 1970s.

Splintered-off members of the Weather Underground and the Black Liberation Army formed the May 19th Communist Organization, also referred to as the 19 May Communist Coalition, a United States-based, self-described revolutionary organization. The M19CO name was derived from the birthdays of Ho Chi Minh and Malcolm X. The 19 May Communist Organization was active from 1978 to 1985. It also included members of the Black Panthers and the Republic of New Afrika (RNA). According to a 2001 US government report, the alliance between Black Liberation Army and Weather Underground members had three objectives: free political prisoners from US prisons; appropriate capitalist wealth (through armed robberies) to fund their operations; and initiate a series of bombings and terrorist attacks against the United States.

During the 1980s, both the May 19th Communist Organization (M19CO) and the smaller United Freedom Front were active. After 1985, following the dismantling of both groups, one source reports there were no confirmed acts of left-wing terrorism by similar groups. Incidents of left-wing terrorism dropped off at the end of the Cold War (circa 1989), partly due to the loss of support for communism.

In October 2020, the killing of Aaron Danielson was added to the CSIS terrorism database as a deadly far-left attack, the first such incident in over two decades. The killing is also referenced on the Anti-Defamation League's page on antifa, as the only "suspected antifa-related murder" to date; and in the liberal think tank New America Foundation's tally of killings during terrorist attacks in the U.S. since 9/11 as the first recorded fatality in a far-left attack.

In the wake of the September 2025 assassination of Charlie Kirk, Donald Trump and others broadly attributed terrorist acts to left-wing actors. However, studies show that most political violence over recent decades has been caused by right-wing perpetrators, with only three acts caused by either Islamist extremists or left-wing actors. From 2022 through 2024, all 61 political killings were committed by right-wing extremists. After Kirk's assassination, CSIS reported that, for the first time in more than 30 years, far-left terrorist attacks and plots outnumbered far-right attacks and plots in 2025, making the year the most violent for left-wing terrorism since that time. CSIS also noted that attacks carried out by left-wing attackers were less lethal than those carried out by right-wing or jihadist attackers, with only two fatalities attributed to left-wing terrorism since 2020: Danielson and Brian Thompson in 2024. This was attributed to the types of targets selected by left-wing attackers, their limited skill, and a disorganized and uncoordinated extremist movement driven by an intention to signal opposition or cause disruption rather than inflict mass casualties.

==== FARC ====
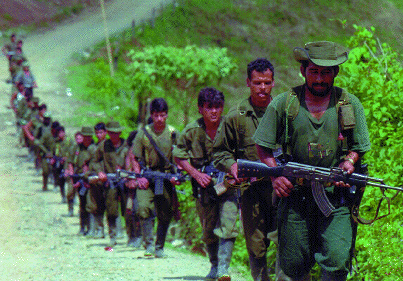
FARC guerrillas marching through the jungle, 1998

The Revolutionary Armed Forces of Colombia (FARC) is a Marxist–Leninist organization in Colombia that has engaged in vehicle bombings, gas cylinder bombings, killings, placing of land mines, kidnapping, extortion and hijacking as well as both guerilla and conventional military tactics. The United States Department of State includes the FARC-EP on its list of foreign terrorist organizations, as does the European Union. It funds itself primarily through extortion, kidnapping and their participation in the illegal drug trade. Many of their fronts enlist new and underage recruits by force, distribute propaganda and rob banks. Businesses operating in rural areas, including agricultural, oil, and mining interests, were required to pay "vaccines" (monthly payments) which "protected" them from subsequent attacks and kidnappings. An additional, albeit less lucrative, source of revenue was highway blockades in which guerrillas stopped motorists and buses in order to confiscate jewelry and money. An estimated 20 to 30 percent of FARC combatants are under 18 years old, with many as young as 12 years old, for a total of around 5,000 children. Children who try to escape the ranks of the guerrillas are punished with torture and death.

==== Shining Path ====
The Communist Party of Peru, more commonly known as the Shining Path, is a Maoist guerrilla organization that launched the internal conflict in Peru in 1980. Widely condemned for its brutality, including violence deployed against peasants, trade union organizers, popularly elected officials and the general civilian population, Shining Path is on the United States Department of State's "Designated Foreign Terrorist Organizations" list. Peru, the European Union, and Canada likewise regard Shining Path as a terrorist group and prohibit providing funding or other financial support.

According to Peru's Truth and Reconciliation Commission in 2003, the actions of the Shining Path claimed between 31,331 and 37,840 lives between 1980 and 2000.

==== Tupamaros ====
The National Liberation Movement – Tupamaros was a Marxist-Leninist urban guerrilla group in Uruguay that operated between the 1960s and early 1970s and was inspired by the Cuban Revolution. However, unlike the latter, the guerrilla warfare in Uruguay was active in urban areas. The organization was involved in weapons theft, murder, kidnapping and bombings. Major attacks include the bombing of the Bowling Club in Carrasco, the Taking of Pando and the murder of farmer Pascasio Báez. By 1972, most of its members had already been imprisoned after the Armed Forces were charged with the fight against insurgency.

The activity of the MLN-Tupamaros in urban areas inspired other far-left movements, mainly in West Germany, where the 2 June Movement, the Red Army Faction and Tupamaros West-Berlin emerged. The kidnapping of CIA officer Dan Mitrione was depicted in the 1972 film State of Siege.

=== Asia ===
Stefan M. Audrey describes the Japanese Red Army and the Liberation Tigers of Tamil Eelam (LTTE) as the main left-wing terrorist organizations in Asia, although he notes that the LTTE later transformed into a nationalist terrorist organization.

==== Communist Party of India (Maoist) and Naxalites ====
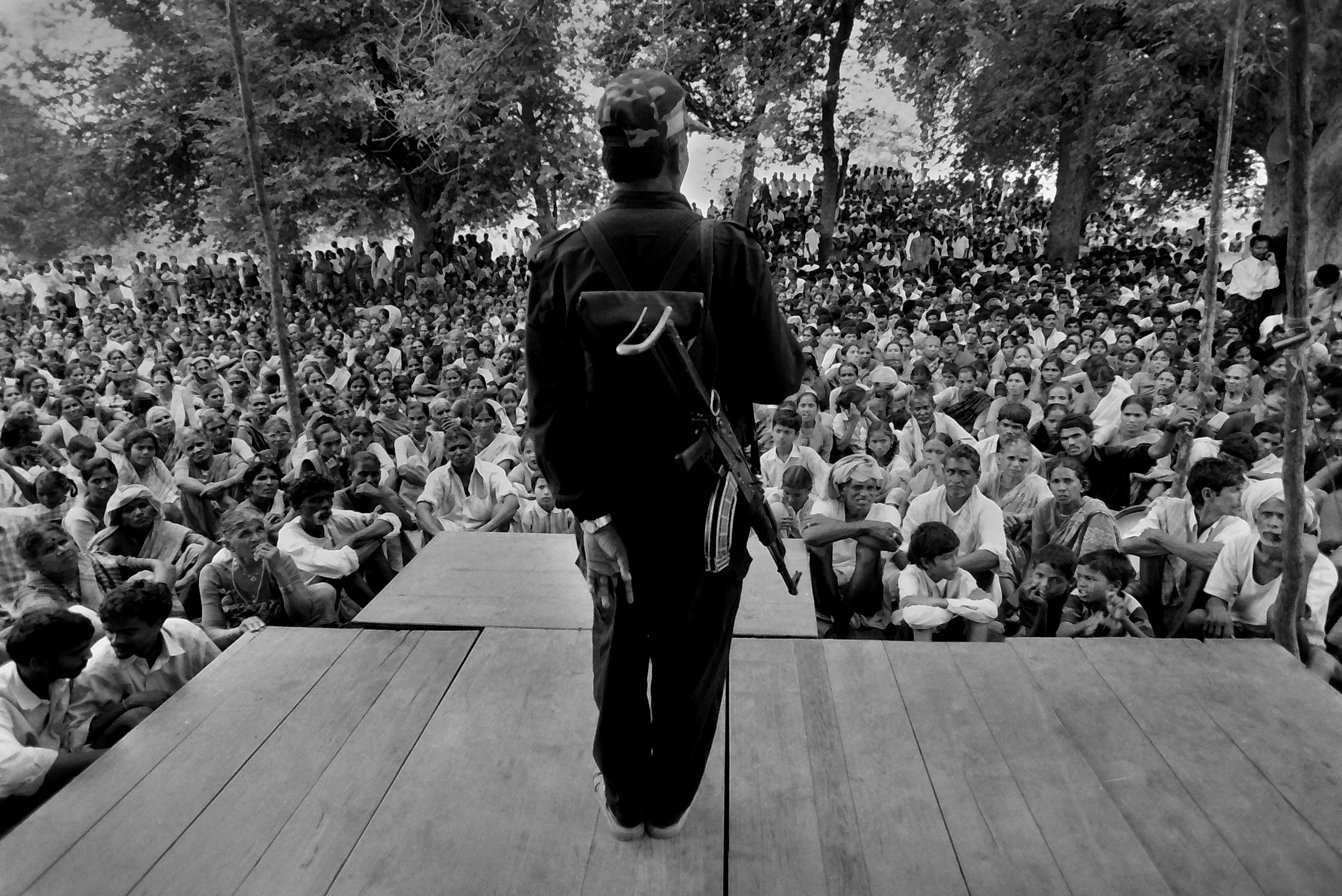
Naxalite Movement in the 1990s

The Indian government has engaged in a conflict with the left-wing extremist groups since the late 1960s. The insurgency started after the 1967 Naxalbari uprising and the subsequent split of the Communist Party of India (Marxist) leading to the creation of a Marxist–Leninist faction. The faction splintered into various groups supportive of Maoist ideology, claiming to fight a rural rebellion and people's war against the government.

The armed wing of the Maoists is called the People's Liberation Guerrilla Army. They have conducted multiple attacks on the security forces and government workers. The influence zone of the Naxalites is called the red corridor, which consists of about 25 districts in Central and East India in 2021. The insurgency reached its peak in the late 2000s with almost 180 affected districts and has been on the decline since then due to the counter-insurgency actions and development plans formulated by the Government. Naxalites have engaged in numerous terrorist attacks and human rights violations in India's Red Corridor. Armed Naxalite movements are considered India's largest internal security threat, and these groups have been declared as terrorist organisations by the Indian government.

==== Communist Party of Nepal (Maoist) ====
The Communist Party of Nepal (Maoist) has been responsible for hundreds of attacks on government and civilian targets.

After the United People's Front of Nepal (UPF)'s Maoist wing, CPN-M, performed poorly in elections and was excluded from the 1994 election, the Maoists turned to insurgency. They aimed to overthrow Nepal's monarchy and parliamentary democracy, and to change Nepalese society, including a purge of the nation's elite class, a state takeover of private industry, and collectivization of agriculture. In Nepal, attacks against civilian populations occurred as part of Maoist strategy, leading Amnesty International to state:

The CPN (Maoist) has consistently targeted private schools, which it ideologically opposes. On the 14 April 2005 the CPN (Maoist) demanded that all private schools shut down, although this demand was withdrawn on 28 April. Following this demand, it bombed two schools in western Nepal on 15 April, a school in Nepalganj, Banke district on 17 April and a school in Kalyanpur, Chitwan on 21 April. CPN (Maoist) cadres also reportedly threw a bomb at students taking classes in a school in Khara, Rukum district.

==== Communist Party of the Philippines ====
The Communist Party of the Philippines has been responsible for several attacks on government and civilian targets. It was founded in 1968 by Jose Maria Sison, four years prior to Martial Law. They aimed to overthrow the Philippine President and the national government, and to change Philippine society, including a purge of the nation's elite class, a state takeover of private industry, and collectivization of agriculture through National Democracy. The CPP's armed wing, New People's Army, is responsible for attacking the military in the Philippine Mountains. Between 2002 and 2005, these groups were designated as terrorists by the United States and the European Union.

==== Japanese Red Army ====
The Japanese Red Army (JRA) was founded in 1969 as the "Red Army Faction" by students impatient with the Communist Party. In 1970, they hijacked a plane to North Korea, where nine of their members were interned. Fourteen members were killed during an internal purge. In 1971, the renamed JRA formed a connection with the Popular Front for the Liberation of Palestine and established a base in Lebanon. Their major terrorist acts included an armed attack on the Tel Aviv airport, hijacking planes to Libya and Bangladesh, kidnapping the French ambassador to the Hague, and bombing a United Service Organizations (USO) nightclub in Naples, Italy. By the mid-1990s, their level of activity had declined and the US State Department no longer considered them a terrorist threat. In 2001, their leader announced the dissolution of the group, although some of its members were in prison and others were still wanted by police.

=== Europe ===
Typically small and urban-based, left-wing terrorist organizations in Europe have been committed to overthrowing their countries' governments and replacing them with regimes guided by Marxist–Leninist ideology. Although none have achieved any degree of success in accomplishing their goals, they have caused serious security problems in Germany, Belgium, Italy, Greece, France, Turkey, Portugal and Spain.

==== Action directe ====
Action directe (AD) was active in France between 1979 and 1987. Between 1979 and 1985, they concentrated on non-lethal bombings and strafings of government buildings, although they assassinated a French Ministry of Defense official. Following arrests of some of its members, the organization declined and became inactive. The French government has banned the group.

==== Communist Combatant Cells ====
The Communist Combatant Cells (CCC) was founded in 1982 in Belgium by Pierre Carette. With about ten members, the CCC financed its activities through a series of bank robberies. Over the course of 14 months, they carried out 20 attacks against property, mostly North Atlantic Treaty Organization (NATO) facilities. Despite attempts to avoid loss of life, there were casualties as a result of these attacks. After Carette and other members were arrested in 1985, the group ceased to be operational. Carette served 17 years of a life sentence, although his colleagues that were convicted with him were released earlier.

==== First of October Anti-Fascist Resistance Groups ====
The First of October Anti-Fascist Resistance Groups (GRAPO) was a Maoist terrorist group in Spain that was founded in 1975. Since its inception until 2007, it assassinated 84 people, including police, military personnel, judges and civilians; either by bombings or shootings. The group has committed a number of kidnappings, initially for political reasons, later on, mainly for extortion. Its last attack was committed in 2006, when GRAPO militants shot dead Ana Isabel Herrero, the owner of a temporary work agency in Zaragoza.

==== Irish National Liberation Army ====
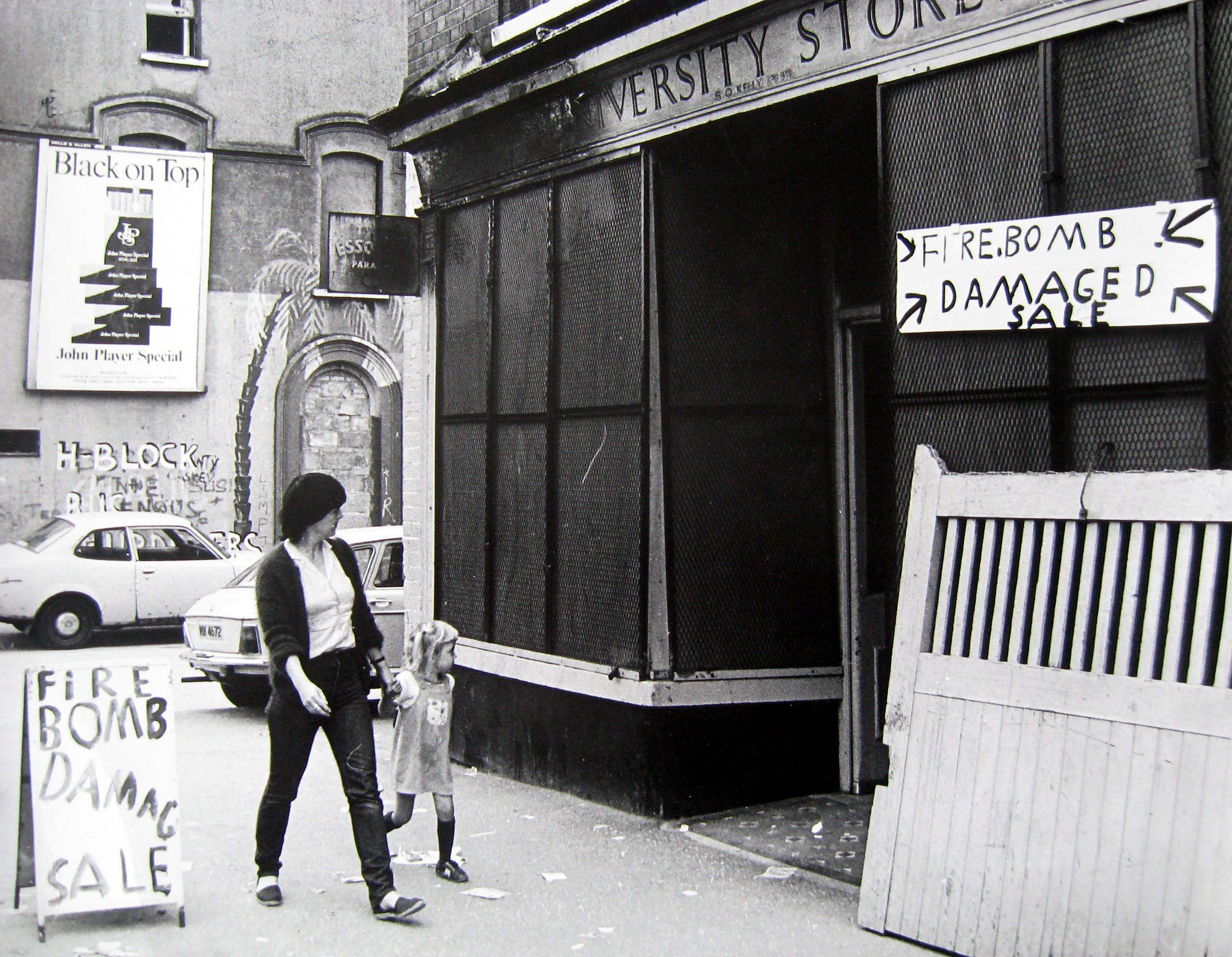
Storefront after firebomb damage in Belfast, Northern Ireland during the Troubles

The Irish National Liberation Army (INLA) is an Irish republican communist paramilitary group formed on 10 December 1974, during "the Troubles". It seeks to remove Northern Ireland from British control and create a socialist republic encompassing all of Ireland. It is the paramilitary wing of the Irish Republican Socialist Party (IRSP).

The INLA was founded by former members of the Official Irish Republican Army who opposed that group's ceasefire. It was initially known as the "People's Liberation Army" or "People's Republican Army". The INLA waged a paramilitary campaign against the British Army and Royal Ulster Constabulary (RUC) in Northern Ireland. It was also active to a lesser extent in the Republic of Ireland and Great Britain. High-profile attacks carried out by the INLA include the Droppin Well bombing, the 1994 Shankill Road killings, and the assassinations of Airey Neave in 1979 and Billy Wright in 1997. It also carried out some bombings and robberies in mainland Europe in collaboration with West German militant group Revolutionary Cells and the French action directe. However, it was smaller and less active than the main republican paramilitary group, the Provisional IRA. It was also weakened by feuds and internal tensions. Members of the group used the cover names People's Liberation Army (PLA), People's Republican Army (PRA) and Catholic Reaction Force (CRF) for attacks its volunteers carried out but the INLA did not want to claim responsibility for. The Irish People's Liberation Organisation (IPLO) was a breakaway group formed in 1986 and forcibly disbanded by the Provisional IRA (PIRA) in 1992.

The INLA is a Proscribed Organisation in the United Kingdom under the Terrorism Act 2000 and an illegal organisation in the Republic of Ireland.

==== Popular Forces 25 April ====
The Popular Forces 25 April (FP-25) was formed in Portugal under the leadership of Lt. Col. Otelo Saraiva de Carvalho, who lead the Carnation Revolution in 1974. It was a far-left terrorist group operating in Portugal between 1980 and 1987. Most of its members had previously been active in the Revolutionary Brigades (Brigadas Revolucionárias), an armed group with links to the Revolutionary Party of the Proletariat (Partido Revolucionário do Proletariado) extinguished in 1978. Over 7 years, FP-25 were responsible for 19 deaths, including a four-month-old baby, a General Director of Prison Service, a dissident/repentant terrorist, several National Republican Guards (GNR) soldiers and five terrorists killed during robberies or clashes with security forces. The violence was partially stopped in June 1984, with a secret police operation under a code name "Orion", which resulted in the arrest of most of its leaders and operatives. They would be later tried in October 1986.

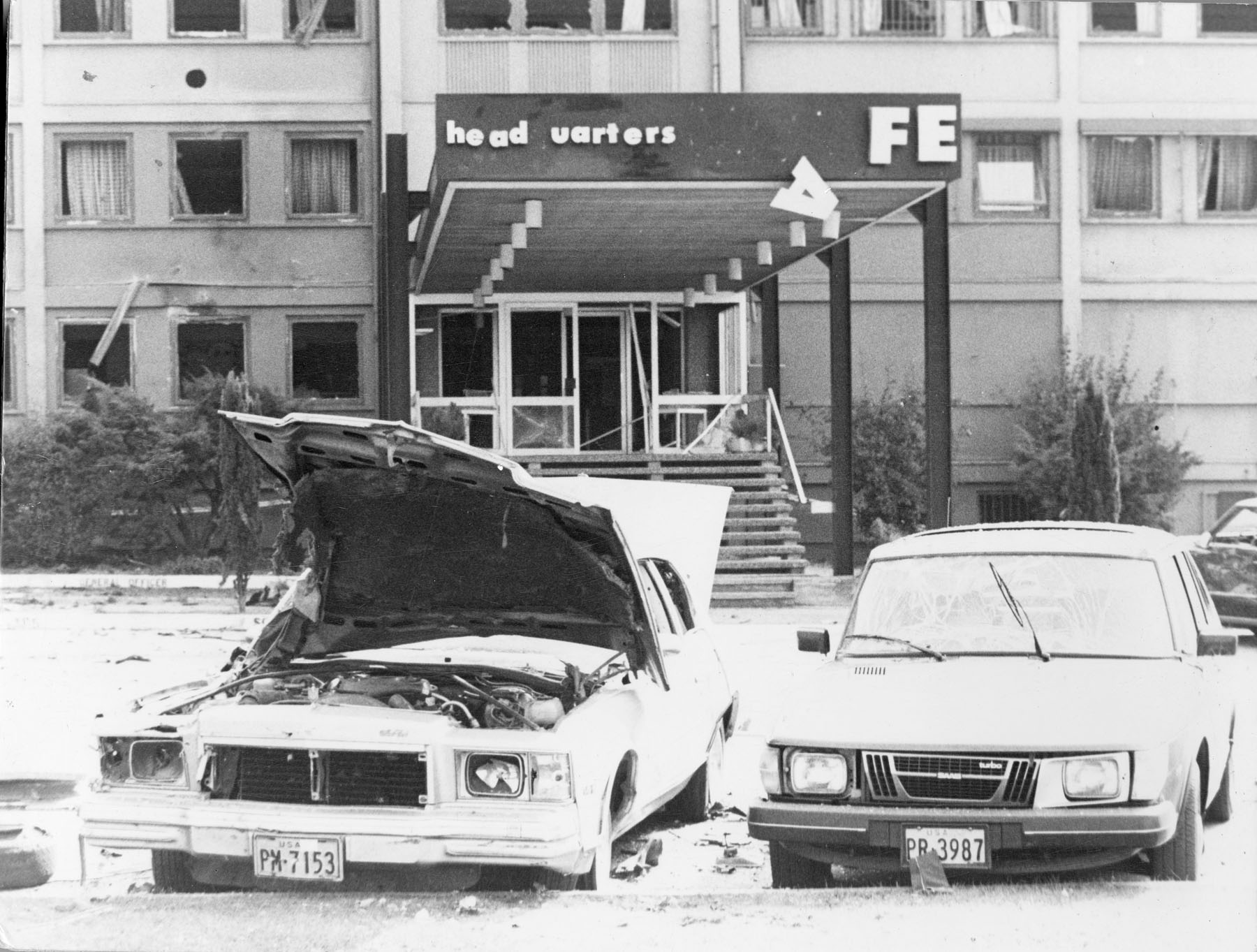
Aftermath of a 1981 Red Army Faction bombing

==== Red Army Faction ====
The Red Army Faction (RAF), which developed out of the Baader-Meinhof Group in Germany, carried out a series of terrorist attacks in the 1970s and remained active for over 20 years. The RAF was organized into small isolated cells, and had connections with the Popular Front for the Liberation of Palestine and Carlos the Jackal. Although the group's leaders, including Gudrun Ensslin, Andreas Baader and Ulrike Meinhof were arrested in 1972, it carried out major attacks, including the kidnapping and murder of Hanns-Martin Schleyer, president of the Confederation of German Employers' Associations and of the Federation of German Industries, and the hijacking of the Lufthansa Flight 181 in the so-called "German Autumn" of 1977.

==== Red Brigades ====
The Red Brigades were founded in August 1970, mostly by former members of the Italian Communist Youth Federation who had been expelled from the parent party for extremist views. The largest terrorist group in Italy, its aim was to violently overthrow the government and replace it with a communist system. Its members were responsible for the kidnapping and murder of Aldo Moro, a prominent member of Christian Democracy who served twice as prime minister of Italy.

==== Revolutionary Organization 17 November ====
The Revolutionary Organization 17 November, also known as 17N or N17, was a Greek urban terrorist organization named in commemoration of a 1973 mass demonstration and riot against the military junta. By 1975 the group had killed 23 people, including U.S. officials, NATO officials and Greek politicians, magistrates and businessmen. Attempts by the Greek police, the Central Intelligence Agency (CIA), and Scotland Yard to investigate the group were unsuccessful. The group was captured in 2002, after one of its members was wounded by a bomb he was carrying. It has been recognized as a terrorist organization by the Greek State, the US and international law enforcement agencies.

==== Revolutionary People's Liberation Party/Front ====
The Revolutionary People's Liberation Party/Front is a militant Marxist–Leninist party in Turkey. The US, UK and EU categorize it as a terrorist organization. As of 2007, the Counter-Terrorism and Operations Department of Directorate General for Security list it among the 12 active terrorist organizations in Turkey. It is one of the 44 names listed in the 2008 U.S. State Department list of Foreign Terrorist Organizations, one of the 48 groups and entities to which the EU's Common Position 2001–931/CFSP on the application of specific measures to combat terrorism applies and one of the 45 international terrorist organisations in the list of Proscribed Terrorist Groups of the UK Home Office.

== Prevention ==
Programs supporting disengagement, exit and stigmatisation of violence can lead to deradicalization through push–pull processes.

== See also ==
- Communist terrorism
- Eco-terrorism
- Illegalism
- Terrorism in the United States

== Bibliography ==
- Atkins, Stephen E. Encyclopedia of modern worldwide extremists and extremist groups. Westport, CT: Greenwood Publishing Group, 2004. ISBN 0-313-32485-9.
- Aubrey, Stefan M. The new dimension of international terrorism. Zurich: vdf Hochschulverlag AG, 2004. ISBN 3-7281-2949-6.
- Brockhoff, Sarah, Krieger, Tim and Meierrieks, Daniel, "Looking Back on Anger: Explaining the Social Origins of Left-Wing and Nationalist Separatist Terrorism in Western Europe, 1970–2007" (2012). APSA 2012 Annual Meeting Paper. Available at SSRN: Looking Back on Anger: Explaining the Social Origins of Left-Wing and Nationalist Separatist Terrorism in Western Europe, 1970-2007.
- Bush, George (task force). Terrorist Group Profiles. DIANE Publishing, 1989. ISBN 1-56806-864-6.
- Kushner, Harvey W. Encyclopedia of terrorism. London: Sage Publications Ltd., 2003. ISBN 0-7619-2408-6.
- Moghadam, Assaf. The roots of terrorism. New York: Infobase Publishing, 2006. ISBN 0-7910-8307-1.
- Pluchinsky, Dennis A. "Western Europes's red terrorists: the fighting communist organizations". In Yonah Alexander and Dennis A. Pluchinsky (Eds.), Europe's red terrorists: the fighting communist organizations. Oxford: Frank Cass and Company, 1992. ISBN 978-0-7146-3488-3.
- Smith, Brent L. Terrorism in America: pipe bombs and pipe dreams. Albany: SUNY Press, 1994. ISBN 0-7914-1760-3.
