= El Pepe: A Supreme Life =

2018 documentary film by Emir Kusturica

- Directed by: Emir Kusturica
- Starring: Pepe Mujica
- Production companies: Kramer & Sigman Films; Oriental Films
- Distributed by: Netflix
- Release dates: September 2, 2018 (Venice Film Festival); December 27, 2019
- Running time: 74 minutes
- Countries: Argentina, Uruguay, Serbia
- Language: Spanish
- Box office: $78,683

El Pepe: A Supreme Life (Spanish: El Pepe, Una Vida Suprema) is a 2018 documentary film directed by Emir Kusturica about the life and legacy of Uruguayan politician and former guerrilla fighter José Mujica.

== Cast ==
- José Mujica
- Lucía Topolansky
- Eleuterio Fernández Huidobro
- Mauricio Rosencof
- Emir Kusturica

== Release ==
The documentary debuted, out of competition, at the Venice Film Festival 2018. and became available for streaming on Netflix on December 27, 2019.

=== Reception ===
The film has received praise and criticism alike.

On Rotten Tomatoes it has a 100% rating based on reviews from five critics.

Former Tupamaro guerrilla fighter Jorge Zabalza, whose brother died at the Taking of Pando in 1969, has become a vocal critic of the film.
