= Otterman =

Otterman is a surname. Notable people with the surname include:

- John Otterman, former member of the Ohio House of Representatives
- Robert J. Otterman, former member of the Ohio House of Representatives
- Michael Otterman, freelance journalist and documentary filmmaker

== See also ==
- Kushtaka, a mythical shape-shifting creature
- Ottoman (disambiguation)
