= Taking of Pando =

1969 battle in Uruguay

- Part of the far-left insurgency in Uruguay
Date	8 October 1969
Location	Pando, Canelones Department, Uruguay
Result	Uruguayan Government victory: Capture of numerous insurgents

Belligerents
Uruguay	Tupamaros

Commanders and leaders
Unknown	Raul Sendic

Units involved
National Police of Uruguay; Uruguayan Armed Forces: Uruguayan Army; Uruguayan Air Force; Aviation Group No. 5	Unknown

Strength
Unknown	~50 guerillas

Casualties and losses
1+ killed	3+ killed 20+ captured
- 1+ killed, 1+ injured

The Taking of Pando (Spanish: Toma de Pando), or the Storming of Pando, was the occupation of the city of Pando, Department of Canelones, by the National Liberation Movement-Tupamaros (MLN-T) during the government of Jorge Pacheco Areco, on October 8, 1969. This event occurred within the context of the guerrilla warfare that the Oriental Republic of Uruguay experienced during the 1960s and 1970s, involving the Armed Forces of Uruguay.

== Timeline of Events ==
=== Taking of Pando ===
On October 8, 1969, several members of the MLN-T stormed the police station, fire station, telephone exchange, and several bank offices in the city of Pando, located 32 kilometers from Montevideo. Their operations began at 13:00 on October 8, 1969, and involved approximately 50 guerrillas. Given the considerable number of participants, the transfer to the city was carried out using a funeral procession as a ruse. Upon arrival in the city, various dependencies of the Ministry of the Interior were captured, including the National Police Station in the City of Pando and the Fire Station adjacent to it. The capture was led by a couple who presented themselves as members of the Uruguayan Air Force. Subsequently, the fire station was captured. With all the officials in these dependencies subdued, the capture of the city's telephone exchange proceeded, aiming to cut off the city's communication with the outside world, as it is located 32 kilometers from Montevideo but very close to some military bases, such as the Artigas Airport, home of the Military School of Aeronautics, located just outside the city to the south.

Simultaneously with the capture of the telephone exchange, the rest of the guerrillas proceeded towards the main target of the operation, branches of the Banco Pan de Azúcar, the Banco La Caja Obrera, and the Banco de la República Oriental del Uruguay (BROU), stealing the equivalent of approximately 357,000 US dollars, more than 3 million dollars in today's value (2023-2024), of which the Uruguayan state eventually recovered 157,000.

=== Retreat ===
All these events took place over a period of 20 minutes. With the captured money, the guerrillas began their retreat in the same vehicles that had been used for transportation to the city, once again simulating a funeral procession. At that moment, however, they encountered a member of the National Police, who opened fire and managed to injure one of the vehicle drivers. During this confrontation, Mr. Carlos Burgueño, a civilian who was in a restaurant celebrating the birth of his son the previous day with patrons of the city, was also injured and later died after being driven to the local police station. As a result of the confrontation, Sergeant Enrique Fernández Díaz of the National Police and the guerrillas Jorge Salerno, Alfredo Cultelli, and Ricardo Zabalza also died. On the other hand, Raúl Sendic, who had been captured, managed to escape, and another 20 guerrillas were captured and transferred to the Police Headquarters in Montevideo. Among them were Élida Baldomir, Olga Barrios, Arapey Cabrera, Elbio Cardozo, Miguel Coitinho, Arturo Dubra, Conrado Fernández, Eleuterio Fernández Huidobro, Germán González, Jorge Iglesias, Leonel Martínez, Jesús Melián, Enrique Osano, César Puig, Juan Carlos Rodríguez, Yamandú Rodríguez, and José Solsona. On October 9, Ruben García Bianchimano, Nybia González, and Augusto Gregori were captured. This was made possible through the coordination of land and air means, involving the Aviation Group No. 5 (Search and Rescue) of the Uruguayan Air Force with a light aircraft Piper PA-18-150 Super Cub and a Hiller H-23F helicopter, from which they guided the ground forces.

== Aftermath ==
Due to the successful outcome of the operation, described by the Inspector General of the Air Force, Brigadier (P.A.M.) Danilo E. Sena, as "a demonstration of capacity, selflessness, correctness, and discipline throughout the procedure," Aviation Group No. 5 was congratulated in Order of the Inspector General of the Air Force No. 1,329, which also stated that "actions like the one described constitute a clear example of efficiency [...] also demonstrating to the public the patriotic determination of our organization to intervene, even in non-specific functions, when the high interests of the nation demand it."

On August 16, 2012, Carlos Burgueño's son, Diego, filed a lawsuit in the courts, seeking to have the guerrilla leaders of that era called to answer for his father's death. In his lawsuit, Diego Burgueño charged "the participants, ideologues, and others involved in the MLN-T in the events," including "intentional homicide" of his father, "taking of hostages," and other crimes. According to the ruling of the Departmental Prosecuting Attorney, Pablo Rivas Vignolo, the Judge of First Instance of Pando of the First Turn, Gerardo Núñez, ordered the filing of the complaint.

== In popular culture ==
The singer-songwriter Daniel Viglietti composed a song about the Taking of Pando.

At the beginning of 2020, Diego Burgueño met with Jorge Zabalza. The latter was particularly critical of the portrayal of events in the film by filmmaker Emir Kusturica "El Pepe, a Supreme Life", considering them "biased."
