= Murder of Pascasio Báez =

- Location: Maldonado Department, Uruguay
- Date: 21 December 1971
- Attack type: Kidnapping; Murder
- Perpetrator: MLT–Tupamaros

Pascasio Ramón Báez Mena (22 February 1925 – 21 December 1971) was a Uruguayan rural worker who was murdered by the National Liberation Movement – Tupamaros, a far-left urban guerrilla group. His killing shocked Uruguayan society and became a symbol of the turmoil and insurgent violence that the country experienced in the 1960s and 1970s.

== Background ==
Baéz was born in the rural area of the Department of Maldonado, the second of three children and only son of Dagoberto Báez and Margarita Pascasia Mena. By 1971, he lived in the city of Pan de Azúcar with his wife Alejandrina Garrido and their children, and made a living working in the fields as a ranch hand and as a bricklayer. Garrido died on December 23, 1971, a week after her husband's kidnapping.

== Kidnapping and murder ==
On the morning of December 11, 1971, Baéz went to the countryside to retrieve a mare that had escaped. The animal was owned by two neighbors, who had hired him to herd it in a neighboring field. Due to a storm the night before, the fence that separated the large Espartacus ranch, located at kilometer 112.550 of Route 9, had been blown down, allowing the mare to enter the property.

While Báez was walking through the ranch, he inadvertently encountered a "tatucera" (Note: The term 'tatucera' derives from 'tatú,' the name used in Uruguay for the armadillo species Dasypodidae, which burrows underground.) — an underground hideout used by members of the MLN–Tupamaros. Upon being observed by the revolutionaries, he was coerced into descending into the hideout, which functioned as a weapons depot, out of concern that he might alert the authorities to their presence. There, he was detained and subjected to interrogation, before being kept in a sedated state.

Tupamaro militant Jorge Zabalza later stated that, following Báez’s kidnapping, the movement deliberated on several options regarding his fate. These included transferring him to the Cárcel del Pueblo (Spanish for 'People's Prison') —an informal detention center that the insurgents clandestinely set up in Montevideo to imprison their hostages— covertly relocating him to Cuba, or killing him. After holding him hostage for over a week, the revolutionaries decided to execute Baéz, injecting him with an overdose of pentothal, on December 21.

In May 2025, former Tupamaro militant Henry Engler stated that one of the options considered was to send Báez to Chile and relocate him there. However, the person who was supposed to carry out that task refused, and for that reason, they resorted to murder.

== Discovery of body ==
On May 22, 1972, officers of the National Army discovered the hideout and arrested the nine Tupamaro militants who were hiding there, also seizing an arsenal. According to statements made by those arrested, Ismael Fernando Bassini Campiglia, an advanced medical student, was the one who administered the injection.

On June 21, the body was exhumed. It had been buried in a pasture near the site where the hideout had been discovered.
