= Zack Milkovich =

American politician

Member of the Ohio House of Representatives from the 35th district
- In office 2011 – January 3, 2015
- Preceded by: John Otterman
- Succeeded by: Greta Johnson

Personal details
- Party: Democratic

Zack Milkovich is a former member of the Ohio House of Representatives, serving the Thirty-Fifth District from 2011 to 2014 and representing the City of Barberton and portions of Akron, Ohio. He is the current city councilman for Akron's 10th Ward, and also owns a private real estate investment group.

== Early life ==
The Milkovich family is of Serbian ancestry. He and his family immigrated to the United States in 1967.

== Career ==
After attending the University of Akron, Milkovich worked in Akron's tire mold industry for twenty years before winning the Thirty-Fifth House District in the Ohio Legislature and is the current Ward Ten councilman in Akron.

== Ohio House of Representatives ==
Although John Otterman, and his father, Robert J. Otterman had held the Akron seat for years, Milkovich won an upset victory in the 2010 primary. In the heavily Democratic district, Milkovich managed to obtain eight hundred more votes than Otterman. He went on to defeat Republican Charles Lasher by 6,000 votes to take the seat in the general election.

In 2012, he won reelection with 71.13% of the vote over Republican Kevin Mitchell. Milkovich was sworn into his second term in January, 2013. He served on the Commerce, Labor and Technology; Transportation, Public Safety and Homeland Security; Military and Veterans Affairs and Ways and Means committees. Milkovich sponsored House Bill 232 which was signed into law by the Governor on April 10, 2014, as well as House Bill 69 that was signed into law December 19, 2014 that reformed the criteria of use applying to automated red light cameras.

During his terms in office, Milkovich championed causes such as veteran's issues, extending foster care benefits to children through the age of 21 for children aging out of the foster care system with no safety net to ensure successful independence, and reforming red light camera usage throughout the state that have been ruled by the courts as a violation of due process rights.

On May 6, 2014, Milkovich was defeated in the Democratic primary 46.33%-53.66% by former prosecutor Greta Johnson.
