= A Twelve-Year Night =

2018 film by Álvaro Brechner

- Film poster
- Spanish: La noche de 12 años
- Directed by: Álvaro Brechner
- Written by: Álvaro Brechner
- Produced by: Mariela Besuievsky; Philippe Gompel; Birgit Kemner; Vanessa Ragone; Fernando Sokolowicz
- Starring: Antonio de la Torre; Chino Darín; Alfonso Tort; César Troncoso; Soledad Villamil; Mirella Pascual
- Cinematography: Carlos Catalán
- Edited by: Irene Blecua; Nacho Ruiz Capillas
- Music by: Federico Jusid
- Production companies: Tornasol Films; Alcaraván Films A.I.E.; Haddock Films; Aleph Media; Manny Films; Salado
- Distributed by: Life Films (Uruguay); Syldavia Cinema (Spain)
- Release dates: 1 September 2018 (Venice); 20 September 2018 (Uruguay); 23 November 2018 (Spain)
- Running time: 122 minutes
- Countries: Uruguay; Spain; Argentina; France; Germany
- Language: Spanish
- Box office: $347,908

A Twelve-Year Night (Spanish: La noche de 12 años) is a 2018 drama film directed by Álvaro Brechner. It premiered in Official Selection at the 75th Venice International Film Festival, and it was selected as the Uruguayan entry for the Best Foreign Language Film at the 91st Academy Awards, but it was not nominated. The film won the Golden Pyramid Award at the 40th Cairo International Film Festival. It is a co-production between Uruguay, Spain, Argentina, France and Germany.

The film follows the twelve-year incarceration of members of the Tupamaros, a far-left urban guerrilla group active in the 1960s and 1970s, nine of whom were held as "hostages" between 1972 and 1985. It dramatises the experiences of José Mujica, Mauricio Rosencof and Eleuterio Fernández Huidobro. Mujica later became the 40th president of Uruguay from 2010 to 2015.

== Plot ==
In 1973 Uruguay, the country is ruled by a civic-military dictatorship, and the National Army is embroiled in guerilla warfare with the leftist Tupamaros group. Three Tupamaros members, José "Pepe" Mujica, Mauricio Rosencof and Eleuterio Fernández Huidobro, are held as hostages in a government-run prison. In the next twelve years, they are repeatedly relocated to military bases around the country.

As the military is unable to kill the men owing to international pressure, it decides to torment them mentally instead. The hostages are subjected to petty rules and abuses, including solitary confinement and a mock execution. Under pressure from the hostages' families, the military chief permits a brief reunion in the prison grounds, but warns the men to be silent.

In 1975, Pepe is separated from the trio and held at the bottom of a grain silo. After a prolonged period, he experiences mental delusions and begins hallucinating about his mother. In another prison, Rosencof strikes up an acquaintance with sergeant Alzamora, and assists him in composing a letter to a girl. The three men are reunited and transported to an underground prison in 1978. Amongst the three, Pepe is locked up in complete isolation in his cell, worsening his condition. He relieves the memories of his capture and fears that they will be forgotten in the years to come.

The hostages are shifted to another prison with better conditions and given special privileges in a ruse to fool a visiting Red Cross delegation, which are revoked when the delegation leaves. During the process, a bar of soap with inscriptions is discovered in Huidobro's possession. He is subjected to questioning which exonerates him of any malicious intent, though the military chief expresses regret in not having killed him.

After items delivered by his mother are misappropriated, Pepe causes a commotion at a military event held near his cell, and is ordered to see a psychiatrist. She promises to raise awareness of his condition. In 1980, the government is defeated in a referendum to amend the constitution to provide the military with a leading role.

In 1983, the hostages are returned to another prison, and Rosencof meets sergeant Alzamora, now a chief guard. Alzamora reveals that he is now married and expresses gratitude to Rosencof, allowing the three men a greater degree of freedom under his custody. In 1985, the military releases the three men amongst other political prisoners in a general amnesty, and they reunite with their families.

== Cast ==
- Antonio de la Torre as José Mujica
- Chino Darín as Mauricio Rosencof
- Alfonso Tort as Eleuterio Fernández Huidobro
- César Troncoso as military chief
- César Bordón as sergeant Alzamora
- Soledad Villamil as psychiatrist
- Mirella Pascual as Lucy Cordano

== Release ==
Distributed by Syldavia Cinema, it was released theatrically in Spain on 23 November 2018.

== Reception ==
=== Critical response ===
On Rotten Tomatoes, the film has an approval rating of 80% based on 15 reviews and an average rating of 7.4/10.

== Awards ==
A Twelve-Year Night won the Golden Pyramid Award at the 40th Cairo International Film Festival on 29 November 2018. The film received six nominations for the 6th Platino Awards, including Best Ibero-American Film and Best Director.

== See also ==
- List of submissions to the 91st Academy Awards for Best Foreign Language Film
- List of Uruguayan submissions for the Academy Award for Best Foreign Language Film
- List of Spanish films of 2018
