= 1973 Uruguayan general strike =

Strike action in response to the 1973 military coup in Uruguay

On 27 June 1973 a coup was declared in Uruguay by the president, Juan María Bordaberry, who closed parliament and imposed direct rule from a junta of military generals. The official reason was to crush the Tupamaros, a Marxist urban guerrilla movement.

Within hours of the coup being declared, the leftist trade union Convención Nacional de Trabajadores called a general strike. Factory occupations took place throughout the country, and many ports, banks and stores closed. On 2 July 1973 the CNT was officially dissolved, though many affiliated unions were allowed to temporarily operate, and two days later the government gave all employers the authority to dismiss workers who failed to return to work. The strike ended 15 days after it started, with nearly all unions busted and most of the trade union leaders in jail, dead, or exiled to Argentina.

Unions and political parties remained illegal until the Uruguayan general strikes of 1984, which were a set of several 24-hour general strikes that eventually forced the military to accept civilian rule and the restoration of democracy.

== See also ==
- Civic-military dictatorship of Uruguay
