= Dan Mitrione =

Controversial US government officer

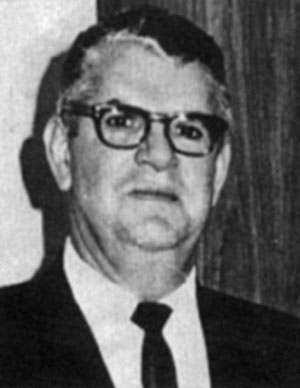

Office of Public Safety Chief Public Safety Adviser in Montevideo, Uruguay
- In office 1969 – August 10, 1970

Chief of the Richmond, Indiana Police Department
- In office 1956 – 1960

Personal details
- Born: Daniel Anthony Mitrione; August 4, 1920 Italy
- Died: August 10, 1970 (aged 50) Montevideo, Uruguay
- Cause of death: Gunshot
- Spouse: Henrietta Lind
- Children: 9

Daniel Anthony Mitrione (August 4, 1920 – August 10, 1970) was an American police officer and advisor. Under the aegis of the International Cooperation Administration and, later, the U.S. Agency for International Development, Mitrione advised law enforcement bodies in Brazil and Uruguay. In July and August 1970, he was kidnapped and later killed by Tupamaro guerrillas in Montevideo. After his death, Mitrione was accused of having been a torture instructor.

== Early life and career ==
Dan Mitrione was born in Italy, the second son of Joseph and Maria Mitrione. The family emigrated to The United States soon after Dan's birth, settling in Richmond in Indiana, where Mitrione grew up. Mitrione married Henrietta Lind while serving on a Michigan naval base during World War II, and the couple eventually had nine children. One of Mitrione's sons, Dan Jr., became an FBI agent but was sentenced to ten years in prison in 1985 after stealing 90 pounds (41 kg) of confiscated cocaine. After the war ended, Mitrione became a police officer in Richmond. He started as a patrolman in 1945, rising through the ranks until he was hired as the Richmond chief of police in 1956, a position which he held until 1960.

== Brazil ==
In 1960, Mitrione joined the Public Safety program of the International Cooperation Administration (ICA). The program, begun in 1954, provided U.S. aid and training to civilian police in countries around the world. Mitrione's first post was in Belo Horizonte, a large city about 250 miles northwest of Rio de Janeiro.

During the two years Mitrione was posted in Belo Horizonte, ICA was replaced by the United States Agency for International Development, and the police aid program was reorganized into the Office of Public Safety (OPS). A key part of Mitrione's mission in Brazil was assuring the local population that OPS assistance to local police did not constitute espionage; to this end, he founded a program which brought thousands of schoolchildren to a municipal police station which hosted a display on the OPS's mission.

After two years in Belo Horizonte, Mitrione was transferred to Rio de Janeiro in 1962, where he trained the secret police of the Department of Political and Social Order. He was working in this role during the 1964 Brazilian coup d'état. By the end of the 1960s, USAID had trained over 100,000 Brazilian police officers. In 1967, he was rotated back to the United States and taught for two years at the OPS International Police Academy in Washington, D.C.

== Uruguay ==
In 1969, Mitrione was appointed the Chief Public Safety Adviser at the American Embassy in Montevideo, Uruguay. In this period the Uruguayan government, led by the Colorado Party, had its hands full with a collapsing economy, labor and student strikes, and the Tupamaros, a left-wing urban guerrilla group. On the other hand, Washington feared a possible victory during the elections of the Frente Amplio, a left-wing coalition, on the model of the also-Cuban-supported victory of the Unidad Popular government in Chile, led by Salvador Allende, in 1970. The OPS had been helping the local police since 1965, providing them with weapons and training.

=== Kidnapping and death ===
Mitrione was kidnapped while being driven to work from his home in Montevideo on July 31, 1970, by the Tupamaros. The kidnapping was part of an elaborate operation, Plan SATAN, which also entailed the kidnapping of the Consul of Brazil, Aloysio Gomide, the failed kidnapping of the Second Secretary of the American Embassy, Gordon Jones, and, later, the kidnappings of USAID agronomist Claude Fly and British Ambassador Geoffrey Jackson. By triggering a diplomatic crisis, the Tupamaros hoped to cause the collapse of Areco government. In return for the release of the hostages, the Tupamaros asked for the release of 150 Tupamaros who were detained or imprisoned by the government. Mitrione's captors communicated with the Uruguayan public via communiques, the second-to-last of which (released on August 8) sentenced him to death.

Despite the entreaties of Ambassador Charles Wallace Adair and President Richard Nixon, President Areco refused to negotiate with the Tupamaros, as a result of which Mitrione was killed in the early morning hours of August 10. His body was found in a stolen car within an hour of his killing. He had been shot twice in the head, but had otherwise been treated well in captivity, save for a bullet wound which had been treated by Tupamaro doctors. Mitrione was the only USAID Public Safety Advisor who was killed in action outside of Vietnam.

In 1987, two years after being released from prison, the leader of the Tupamaros, Raúl Sendic, said in an interview that Mitrione had been selected for kidnapping because he had trained police in riot control, and as retaliation for the deaths of student protesters. He did not mention the accusations of torture. In addition, Sendic claimed that Mitrione's death was unintended; the Tupamaro leaders had decided to keep Mitrione alive and hold him indefinitely instead of killing him if the government continued to refuse their demands. However, on August 7, a week after the kidnapping, Sendic and the leaders of the Tupamaros (including the designated successors, should the present leadership be captured) were captured in a police raid. According to Sendic, the raid led Mitrione's captors, cut off from the rest of the group, to kill Mitrione by the original deadline despite the wishes of Sendic and others. The transcript of Mitrione's interrogation, which was conducted in English, was released by the Tupamaros after his death; the topics of the interrogation included the Vietnam War, embassy security, and US involvement in Latin America writ large.

=== Torture accusations ===
Although the Tupamaros did not cite torture as the grounds for Mitrione's kidnapping and execution, Mitrione was posthumously accused of having been, in the words of Michael Otterman, "a Johnny Appleseed of American DDD torture" (DDD standing for Debility, Dependency, and Dread, a term borrowed from KUBARK). These allegations were stringently denied by the US government and the OAS.

Accusations of torture against Mitrione came within days of his death from Alejandro Otero, an Uruguayan police intelligence officer who would later become an international football referee. Otero, quoted by Jornal do Brasil, claimed that Mitrione had instituted the routine use of torture on guerrillas captured by the police, and that Mitrione's use of torture caused the Tupamaros to adopt more violent tactics.

The torture claim was significantly expounded upon by Manuel Hevia Cosculluela, a Cuban who claimed to have infiltrated the CIA as double agent from 1962 to 1970. In 1978, at the 11th International Youth Festival in Cuba, Cosculluela claimed that Mitrione's training work included torture, often perpetrated on unwilling test subjects, like abducted homeless people. Cosculluela stated that Mitrione's credo was "the precise pain, in the precise place, in the precise amount, for the desired effect." Cosculluela claimed that Mitrione's methods, which he personally demonstrated, were exceptionally sadistic, resulting in the mutilation and eventual death of his victims, and that he had their mutilated bodies dumped in the streets. Mitrione's alleged methods included the use of electrical wires, sensory deprivation, sexual humiliation, and forced standing, and Cosculluela further charged that Mitrione's Montevideo house contained a special soundproof torture chamber in the basement.

== Commemoration ==
The Nixon Administration, through spokesman Ron Ziegler, affirmed that Mitrione's "devoted service to the cause of peaceful progress in an orderly world will remain as an example for free men everywhere." His funeral was widely publicised by the U.S. media and was attended by, amongst others, David Eisenhower and Richard Nixon's secretary of state William Rogers.

Frank Sinatra and Jerry Lewis held a benefit concert for his family in Richmond.

== In fiction ==
The 1972 movie State of Siege by Costa-Gavras is based on the story of Mitrione's kidnapping.

The kidnapping and the execution of Mitrione are also central to the plot of the novel El color que el infierno me escondiera by Uruguayan author Carlos Martínez Moreno.

The French espionage fiction novel SAS 31: L'ange de Montevideo, written in 1973 by Gérard de Villiers, relates the CIA agent kidnapping, torture and killing by the Tupamaros. The agent's name is Ron Barber, but as is often the case in SAS novels, the stories are based on real world events and being as the fictional character Ron Barber was a torture instructor in Uruguay; it is possible that Barber is based on Dan Mitrione.

== See also ==
- History of Uruguay
- History of Brazil (1964-1985)

== Sources ==
- Langguth, A. J. (1978). Hidden Terrors: The Truth about U.S. Police Operations in Latin America. New York: Pantheon Books. ISBN 0-394-73802-0.
