= Cementerio de La Teja, Montevideo =

Cemetery in Uruguay

Cementerio Paso Molino
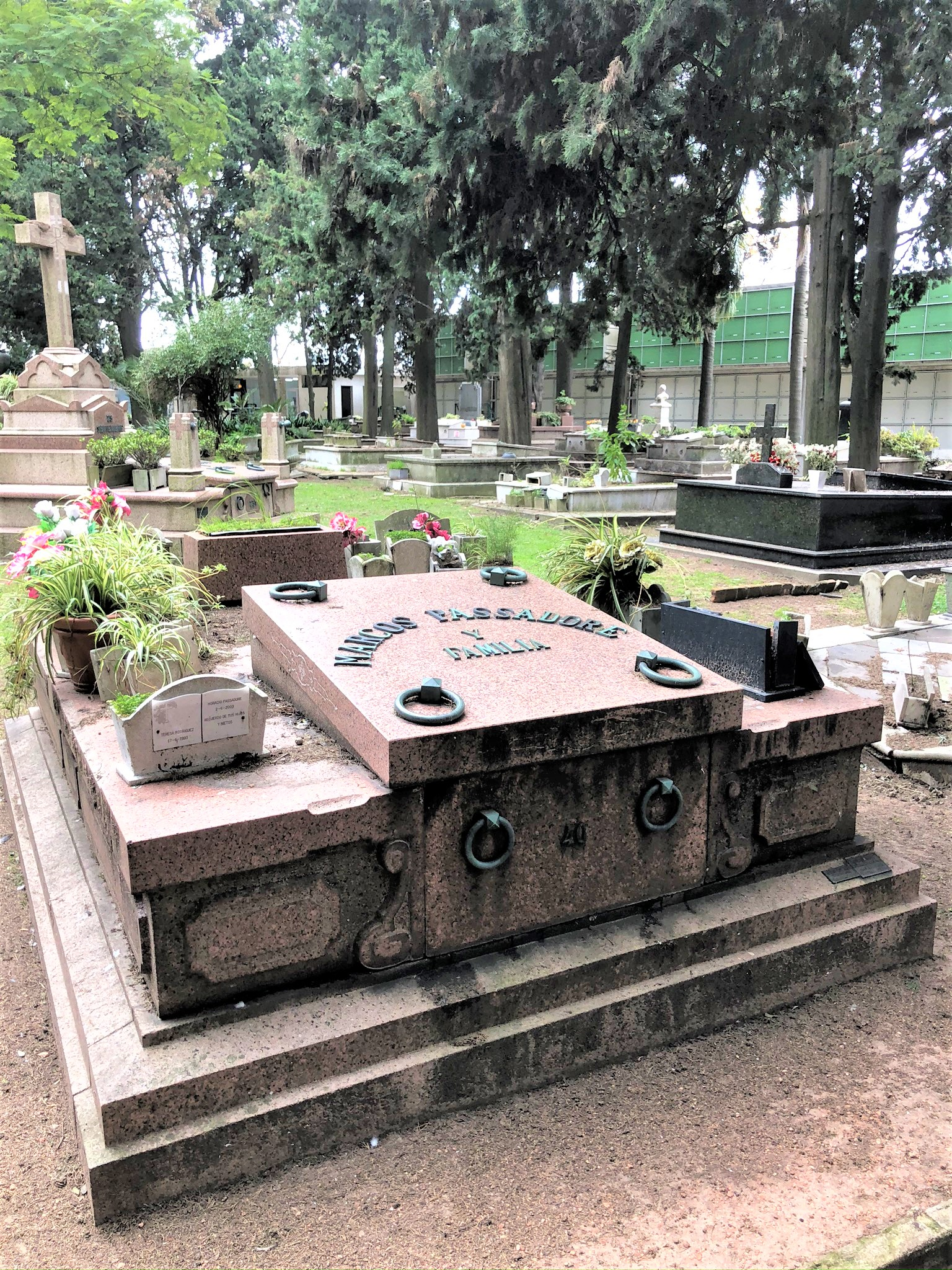
- A grave at La Teja Cemetery.
- Interactive map of Cementerio Paso Molino

Details
- Location: Montevideo
- Country: Uruguay
- Coordinates: 34.8583°S 56.2293°W
- Type: municipal
- Owned by: Intendencia de Montevideo
- Find a Grave: Cementerio Paso Molino

Cementerio Paso Molino, known also as Cementerio de La Teja, is a cemetery in Montevideo, Uruguay. It is located in the barrio of La Teja.

== Interments ==
Among the various grave sites are several notable interments:

- María Auxiliadora Delgado (1937–2019), First Lady of Uruguay (2005–10, 2015–19)
- Abdón Porte (1893–1918), association football player
- Elvira Salvo (1905–2009), businesswoman and philanthropist
- Raúl Sendic (1925–1989), Tupamaro guerrilla fighter
- Carlos Solé (1916–1975), sportscaster
- Tabaré Vázquez (1940–2020), President of Uruguay (2005–10 and 2015–20)
