= Jorge Zabalza =

Uruguayan politician and writer (1943–2022)

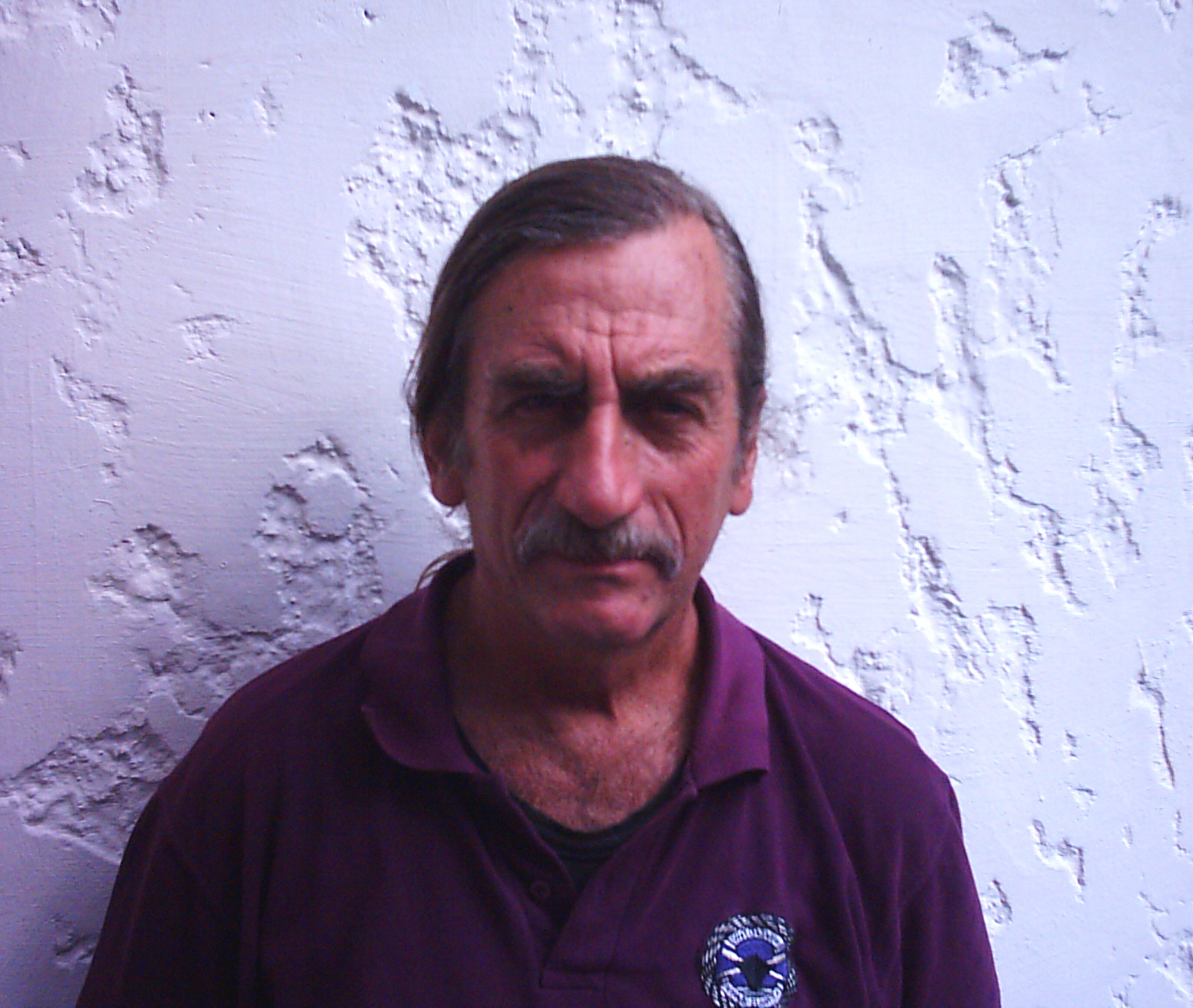
- Jorge Zabalza in 2006.
- Born: Jorge Pedro Zabalza Waksman; 30 November 1943; Minas, Uruguay
- Died: 23 February 2022 (aged 78); Montevideo, Uruguay
- Occupations: Politician, writer
- Office: President of the Junta Departamental de Montevideo
- Political party: Tupamaros; Movement of Popular Participation
- Children: Laura y Juan
- Parent(s): Mary Waksman; Pedro Zabalza Arrospide

Jorge Pedro Zabalza Waksman (30 November 1943 – 23 February 2022) was a Uruguayan politician and writer. He was a former leader within the political organization Tupamaros and former president of the Junta Departamental de Montevideo.

== Biography ==
Zabalza was the son of Mary Waksman and the National Party leader Pedro Zabalza Arrospide. He was active in the Uruguayan Anarchist Federation before becoming a founding member of Tupamaros. As a part of the organization, he took part in the largest robbery in Uruguayan history, in which 55 million pesos were taken from the San Rafael Casino in Punta del Este. His brother, Ricardo Zabalza Waksman, also a Tupamaro, was assassinated during the Taking of Pando on 8 October 1969. His cousin, Guillermo Waksman, was a journalist at Brecha.

Zabalza was taken prisoner on 26 June 1972 alongside eight others, including Eleuterio Fernández Huidobro, for their participation in the Punta del Este robbery. Interned at the Penal de Punta Carretas, he was considered to be one of the hostages of the military dictatorship in Uruguay and endured twelve years of imprisonment and torture.

Following the restoration of democracy in Uruguay, Zabalza became a member of the Movement of Popular Participation (MPP), created by Raúl Sendic. In 1994, he was elected as President of the Junta Departamental de Montevideo. In 1995, he left the Tupamaros while remaining within the MPP. He began to disagree with Tupamaros such as José Mujica and Huidobro, whose reformist agenda drew criticism from him. In 1997, Intendant of Montevideo Mariano Arana proposed the privatization of the Hotel Casino Carrasco. The MPP voted against the privatization, and Zabalza joined his party in the vote despite pressure from Tupamaros leaders.

Zabalza resigned as President of the Junta Departamental de Montevideo following a scandal surrounding Arana regarding a transfer of Vaimaca Pirú's remains with France.

Zabalza died in Montevideo on 23 February 2022, at the age of 78.
