= Greta Johnson =

American politician (born 1977)

Member of the Ohio House of Representatives from the 35th district
- In office January 3, 2015 – March 2, 2017
- Preceded by: Zack Milkovich
- Succeeded by: Tavia Galonski

Personal details
- Born: May 2, 1977 (age 49)
- Party: Democratic
- Education: University of Akron (B.A.) (M.A.); University of Akron School of Law (J.D.)

Greta Johnson (born May 2, 1977) is an American attorney and politician. Johnson is the former representative of the 35th district of the Ohio House of Representatives, serving from January 2015 to March 2017. Johnson is a former assistant prosecutor for Summit County, who challenged incumbent representative Zack Milkovich in the 2014 Democratic primary. Johnson defeated Milkovich with 54% of the vote and won the general election with 61% of the vote. She held the seat until 2017, when she resigned to work for the Summit County Executive.

== Education and early career ==
Johnson is from Akron, Ohio. Johnson has a Bachelor of Arts in Secondary Education and a Master of Arts in Higher Education from the University of Akron where she was captain of the women's volleyball team. She also received a Juris Doctor from the University of Akron School of Law.

Johnson worked as a police legal adviser and the assistant prosecuting attorney in the City of Akron Law Department before becoming a representative. Previously, she was an assistant county prosecutor in Summit and Mahoning counties.

== Ohio House of Representatives ==
=== Political campaigns ===
==== 2014 ====
Johnson challenged incumbent Democrat Zach Milkovich in the 2014 Democratic Primary. The Summit County Democratic Party broke with tradition to endorse her against her in her bid to oust her Democratic, incumbent rival from the Statehouse. Johnson was also endorsed by the Akron Beacon Journal.

In the 2014 general election, Johnson won against Republican challenger Linda Robinson. Johnson was one of only two Democrats elected to the Statehouse from Summit County. Her campaign focused on the value of early education in public schools and the rights of women. She was also critical of state cuts to local schools and local governments.

==== 2016 ====
As an incumbent, Johnson faced no Democratic challenger in the May 2016 primary. In the 2016 general election, Johnson successfully defended her seat against Republican challenger Aimee N. Cooper. Johnson served on Hillary Clinton's Ohio Leadership Team in 2016 to assist Clinton in winning Ohio in the 2016 Democratic Party presidential primaries.

=== State representative ===
During her first term in the Ohio Statehouse Johnson served on the Armed Services, Veterans Affairs and Public Safety; Judiciary; Transportation and Infrastructure; and Joint Committee on Agency Rule Review committees. During her second term, she served on the Criminal Justice; Education and Career Readiness; and Government Accountability and Oversight committees.

Johnson sponsored numerous bills, including a bill to make the preparation of a presentence report optional if both the prosecution and defense agree. Johnson was a vocal defendant of woman's health care and of Planned Parenthood of Ohio. During her time at the Statehouse, she also focused on local issues in her district, she voiced public opposition to a $50 per credit hour fee that the University of Akron administration imposed on students.

== Summit County Executive's Office ==
In March 2017, Johnson stepped down as State Representative and took a position as Deputy Director of Law, Insurance, and Risk Management for Summit County Executive Ilene Shapiro. She currently serves as the Assistant Chief of Staff and Public Information Officer for the Executive's office.

== Electoral history ==
2014 Ohio House of Representatives election, Democratic Primary, District 35
Party	Candidate	Votes	%
Democratic	Greta Johnson	2,208	53.7%
Democratic	Zack Milkovich (Incumbent)	1,907	46.3%

2014 Ohio House of Representatives election, District 35
Party	Candidate	Votes	%
Democratic	Greta Johnson	11,010	62.1%
Republican	Linda Robinson	6,731	37.9%

2016 Ohio House of Representatives election, Democratic Primary, District 35
Party	Candidate	Votes	%
Democratic	Greta Johnson (Incumbent)	8,103	100%

2016 Ohio House of Representatives election, District 35
Party	Candidate	Votes	%
Democratic	Greta Johnson	22,997	62.5%
Republican	Aimee Cooper	13,796	37.5%

== Links ==
- Official campaign site
