= Antonio Francese =

Uruguayan army general

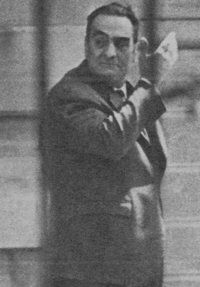

Minister of National Defense
- In office February 7, 1972 – February 13, 1973
- President: Juan María Bordaberry
- Preceded by: Armando Malet
- Succeeded by: Walter Ravenna
- In office March 1, 1967 – April 17, 1970
- Preceded by: Pablo C. Moratorio
- Succeeded by: César R. Borba

Minister of the Interior
- In office April 17, 1970 – January 19, 1971
- President: Jorge Pacheco Areco
- Preceded by: Pedro Cersósimo
- Succeeded by: Santiago de Brum Carbajal

Personal details
- Born: October 29, 1899
- Died: June 5, 1979 (aged 79) Montevideo, Uruguay
- Party: Colorado

Military service
- Rank: Army General

Antonio Francese (October 29, 1899 – June 5, 1979) was a Uruguayan Army general and politician who served as Minister of National Defense from 1967 to 1970 under President Jorge Pacheco Areco and briefly again in February 1973. His second term in office was marked by a significant challenge to his authority when the commanders of the Army and Air Force refused to follow his orders, a moment of defiance that foreshadowed the coup d'état of June 1973.

== Career ==
Francese was born in 1899 to a family of Italian descent. He enrolled in the Uruguay Military School and graduated as an officer in the National Army.
