= 1971 Harco work-in =

Steelworker protest in Campbelltown, New South Wales, Australia

The 1971 Harco work-in was an action undertaken by workers at a steel plant in Campbelltown, New South Wales, Australia. The work-in was the culmination of a protracted industrial dispute between the owners of Harco Steel and the workers at the Campbelltown site. The dispute arose as a result of worker objections to the owners' practice of sacking and then rehiring workers to reduce costs during periods of low production.

After a round of sackings in November 1971, the workers decided that strike action, which was common at the site, was no longer an effective tactic for confronting management. Drawing inspiration from the factory occupations in France in 1968 as well as actions taken by the Upper Clyde Shipbuilders in Scotland earlier in 1971, the Harco workers adopted the tactic of the work-in.

The work-in lasted for a period of four weeks. Workers' self-management was practiced, leading to the introduction of the thirty-five hour working week, and an increase in productivity of around 26%.

The owners of Harco responded in a number of ways, including sabotage and legal action. Workers received community support in the form of donations of food and money.

The work-in ended when Harco obtained an order from the Supreme Court of New South Wales, which compelled the workers to leave the site.
