= Héctor Amodio Pérez =

Uruguayan guerrilla fighter

Héctor Amodio Pérez is a former Uruguayan guerrilla fighter.

He joined the MLN-T, often known as the Tupamaros, in the 1960s. Shortly before the guerrillas were defeated by the military, he defected together with his wife, and left the country. For decades he has been considered a traitor by his former fellow fighters. In mid 2013 he re-appeared in Spain, with a big media impact. Some of his former fellows consider him a "dead man". But the local media managed Amodio's unexpected presence as an occasion to open up the "most execrable and obscure part of the Tupamaros' history".
