= Nationalist terrorism =

Political violence with nationalist motives

Nationalist terrorism is a form of terrorism motivated by a nationalist agenda. Nationalist terrorists seek to form self-determination in some form, which may take the form of gaining greater autonomy, establishing a completely independent sovereign state (separatism), or joining another existing sovereign state with which the nationalists identify (irredentism). Nationalist terrorists often oppose what they consider to be occupying, imperial, or otherwise illegitimate powers. Violence may also be directed at immigrants who are seen as a threat to the prosperity of the local or native population of the country. Nationalist terrorism is linked to a national, ethnic, religious, or other identifying group, and the feeling among members of that group that they are oppressed or denied rights, especially rights accorded to others.

As with the concept of terrorism itself, the term "nationalist terrorism" and its application are highly contentious issues. What constitutes an illegitimate regime and what types of violence and war are acceptable against such a state are subjects of debate. Groups described by some as "nationalist terrorists" tend to consider themselves "freedom fighters", engaged in valid but asymmetric warfare.

== List of alleged terrorist groups ==
The following are nationalist groups, which in some circles have been deemed terrorist:

- Grey Wolves
- Balochistan Liberation Army (BLA)
- ETA
- EOKA
- Partiya Karkerên Kurdistan (PKK)
- Armenian Secret Army for the Liberation of Armenia (ASALA)
- Front de libération du Québec (FLQ)
- Provisional Irish Republican Army (IRA)
- Tamil Tigers (LTTE)
- Ukrainian Insurgent Army (UPA)
- Wawelberg Group
- Lehi
- Irgun
- Chetniks
- Ustashe
- National Bolshevik Front (NBF)

The label of a group as carrying out "nationalist terrorism" does not preclude it being described in other terms:

- Nationalist terrorism may overlap with religiously motivated terrorism, so Palestinian nationalist militant groups are also sometimes Islamic (Hamas, Palestinian Islamic Jihad), and Zionist groups are also sometimes Jewish (Kach and Kahane Chai, Gush Emunim Underground).
- Nationalist terrorism may also be identified with the left wing (for example, ETA, LTTE, IRA) or the right wing (AUC, Sombra Negra)
