= Occupation of factories =

Form of strike action

Occupation of factories is a method of the workers' movement used to prevent lock outs. They may sometimes lead to "recovered factories", in which the workers self-manage the factories.

They have been used in many strike actions, including:

- the 1919–20 Biennio Rosso (in particular the Turin factory occupation of 1920)
- 1936 French general strike (see 1936 Matignon agreements)
- in the May 68 revolts, supported by the Council for Maintaining the Occupations
- in the 1970s in Italy (35-day occupation of the Fiat)
- Upper Clyde Shipbuilders workers staged a work-in during 1971–72 with about 260 further occupations in Britain in the following decade
- the 1971 Harco work-in, Australia
- 1973 Uruguayan general strike
- LIP factory in France in 1973
- the occupation of the ceramics factory formerly known as Zanon in Argentina starting in 2001, that under workers' control changed its name to FaSinPat
- the occupation of the Republic Windows and Doors factory in Chicago in 2008, and the re-occupation of the factory in 2012
- A 77-day occupation of the Ssangyong car factory in 2009
- Occupation of Viomichaniki Metalleutiki in Thessaloniki, Greece, along the lines of factory occupations in Argentina.
- Occupation of the GKN drive shaft manufacturing factory in Campi Bisenzio, Italy, led by Dario Salvetti, following the lay-offs of 422 employees on July 9, 2021.

== Biennio Rosso ==
Radical unionism started after the first world war. The movement was a result of increasing internal commissions or "faculty councils". Around November 1918, the councils/commissions had morphed into a national problem. By February 1919, the federation of Italian metal workers had successfully received a contract permitting these commissions in their factories. In May 1919, these commissions began to transfer into councils that were managing the factories and were dominating the power structure of said workplaces. The contract also prevented democratic elections of these council members or "stewards". In April 1920, at Fiat, there was the beginning of sit-in strikes by the workers, which eventually grew to 500,000 workers striking at its peak.

== The French General Strike ==
In France in January 1936, the PCF, a Stalinist communist organization spurred the creation of a coalition of radicals called the "popular front". This organization was designed to defend democracy and disassemble fascist bonds. In May 1936, the popular front won a majority election and assembled a cabinet of eighteen socialist, thirteen radicals and four independent socialist to govern. Communists supported the leader Leon Blum but refused to join the cabinet. This change in power was spurred by a massive general strike in the years preceding where thousands of factories had been occupied by French workers to ensure said democratic governance. Blum effectively ended the strike when this government came to power.

== May 68 Revolution ==
During a period of civil unrest in France in the 1960s, student protests were joined by factory occupations and strikes by French workers. See May 1968 events in France.

== Fiat Occupation in Italy ==
In the 1960s, a historic movement of strikes and factory occupations had a significant effect on Italy. After constant failure by the government to follow through on promises for reform in Italy, a surge of uprising and strikes occurred between 1968 and 1970. Earlier strikes at northern factories in Turin were successful in gaining momentum in 1962. The Lancia factory walkout was successful in gaining some workers rights. The Michelin Factory strike around the same time had less success. A large strike in Turin however, amassing 93,000 of the Fiat workforce for a massive walkout and intimidation of those who did not participate. After further political negotiation and action through the years that followed, and unsatisfactory changes in policy coupled with increasingly educated and aware workers, the series of massive strikes broke out in 1968. The autumn of 1969 is considered the climax of these strikes and they continued through the early 1970s resulting in significantly improved conditions for Italian workers. In 1973, over 6 million workers were on strike.

== Upper Clyde Shipbuilders Work-In ==
The Upper Clyde Shipbuilders was a consortium of Scottish shipbuilders that was birthed in 1968 by an adjoining of five shipbuilders. It was liquidated in 1971 resulting in an occupation/work-in campaign by shop stewards in shipyards. See Upper Clyde Shipbuilders.

== Harco Work-In ==
The Harco work-in of 1971 was an occupation by steel plant workers in New South Wales, Australia. The 4-week long work-in was the result of a dispute between Harco owners and workers on company sacking and rehiring practices during low production periods to save money. See 1971 Harco work-in.

== Uruguayan General Strike ==
During 1973, a close of parliament and essential dictatorship by the president created unrest and the leftist union called for a general strike and occupation of factories. After two weeks most of the union leaders were in jail, exile, or dead. See 1973 Uruguayan general strike.

== French LIP Factory ==
When the LIP factory in France decided to close a factory due to financial problems in the late 60s and early 70s, strikes and a very public factory occupation eventually transferred control and management of the factory to the workers. See LIP (company)

== Zanon Factory Occupation ==
During the Argentine uprising of the early 2000s, there was a complete takeover of the Zanon tile factory in Argentina. The workers went on strike in the year 2000, the first of a series of strikes that was spurred by the death of a worker from a heart attack. They also were adamant about making their conflicts with the company very public. Workers traveled and occupied places other than factories as well. In January 2001, there was a 6-day strike over unpaid wages. In April 2001, there was a 34-day strike over outstanding wages. These strikes were followed by many other occupations and strikes that ultimately cause the factories to lose almost 50% of their production.

== Republic Windows and Doors Occupation ==
When Republic Windows and Doors company was declared bankrupt in December 2008, an organized sit-own strike of 200 workers in the factory occurred to protest federal labor law violations by the company.

== Ssangyong Car Factory Occupation ==
A long occupation of the Ssangyong car factory by 900 factory workers and several thousand others began on May 22, 2009, after a list of firings was released by the company that showed over 1000 workers to be laid off. This was the result of the company filing for bankruptcy in February 2009. Workers were essentially sieged by the company during their occupation and workers refused all company negotiations that did not include jobs.

== GKN Factory Occupation ==
On July 9, 2021, GKN – a multinational automotive components company owned by the British investment firm Melrose Industries – announced that it would be laying-off all 422 of its workers from its driveshaft manufacturing factory in Campi Bisenzio, Italy. The workers occupied the factory, forming a "permanent assembly" with the goal of not only winning back the lost jobs, but converting the plant into a publicly funded factory that is, in the words of one of the worker-organizers, "free from profiteering, free from fraud, a factory under workers’ control." It is now the longest-running factory occupation in Italian history.

A key component of the occupation has been solidarity with local environmental groups and green causes. In collaboration with a local university, the permanent assembly devised plans to convert the plant into a green factory for hydrogen-fuel research and public bus-parts manufacturing. In a talk given to climate strike activists, GKN worker-organizer Dario Salvetti called for solidarity between the labor and climate movements, stating, “If someone thinks they can tear apart the struggle for the end of the month from the struggle against the end of the world, they will never succeed.” He went on to explain that while GKN management attempted to use the climate crisis against workers, citing it as a reason for closing the factory, the GKN factory collective maintains that, at its root, the climate emergency shares a common cause with the crises of deindustrialization and worker exploitation. For this reason, according to the workers of the collective, both problems need to be addressed simultaneously and at a structural level by the entire community. In the words of another worker-organizer, Massimo, "“What happened to us was the result of an interrelated series of events which eventually crushed all the rights and possibilities of the working class in this country and that therefore, to solve our problem, it was necessary to solve it fundamentally! And so we did not tell the community: 'Let’s save our jobs' we said: 'let’s rise up together to make sure that these processes are solved thoroughly and collectively.'"

== See also ==
- Sit-down strike
- Bolivarian Circles
- History of Solidarity
