= John Otterman =

American politician

Member of the Ohio House of Representatives from the 45th district
- In office January 8, 2008 – December 31, 2010
- Preceded by: Robert J. Otterman
- Succeeded by: Zack Milkovich

Personal details
- Party: Democratic
- Profession: Environmental Consultant

John Otterman is a former Democratic member of the Ohio House of Representatives, who represented the 45th District from 2008 to 2010. An environmental consultant and a former member of Akron, Ohio City Council from 1992 to 2007, Otterman is the son of Robert J. Otterman, a prominent Akron politician.

In 2008, the elder Otterman retired early from his seat in the Ohio House, prompting Democrats to appoint a successor. The younger Otterman applied to fill his father's seat, and was appointed. Up for reelection in 2008, Otterman defeated Republican Joe Fazek easily to win a full two-year term.

Otterman gained national attention for specific projects that were facing Akron. Otterman was successful in steering a significant amount of stimulus funds to his district.

Up for a second full term in 2010, Otterman first faced Zack Milkovich, a political novice, in the primary election. Milkovich defeated Otterman in a primary upset. Otterman remained in office for the rest of his term, leaving in December 2010.

Following his defeat, he returned to the private sector.

In 2015, Otterman was elected to the City of Akron School Board.
