= Robert J. Otterman =

American politician

Bob Otterman

Member of the Ohio House of Representatives from the 45th district
- In office January 3, 2001-December 31, 2007
- Preceded by: Betty Sutton
- Succeeded by: John Otterman

Personal details
- Died: Akron, Ohio
- Party: Democratic

Robert J. Otterman is a former member of the Ohio House of Representatives, representing the 45th District from 2001–2008, when he was replaced by his son, John Otterman.
