= National Police of Uruguay =

National Police of Uruguay Policía Nacional de Uruguay
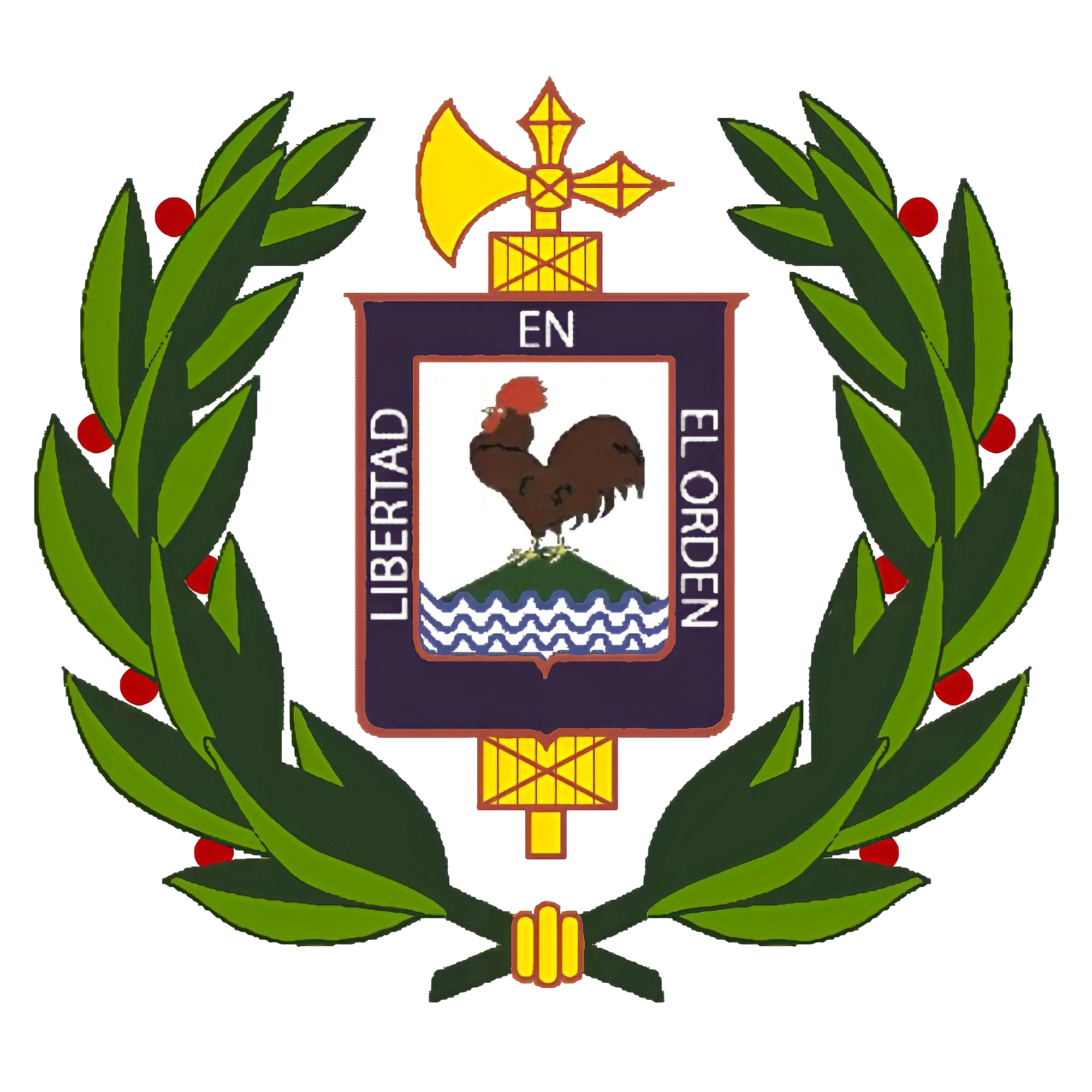
- National Police Coat of Arms

- Common name: Policía Nacional
- Motto: "De tu lado" "On your side"

Agency overview
- Formed: December 18, 1829

Jurisdictional structure
- National agency: Uruguay
- Operations jurisdiction: Uruguay
- Governing body: Cabinet of Uruguay
- General nature: Civilian police

Operational structure
- Headquarters: Montevideo, Uruguay
- Officers: 30.000 (2015)
- Minister responsible: Luis Alberto Héber
- Agency executive: Diego Enrique Fernández, Director-General

Website
- www.minterior.gub.uy

The National Police of Uruguay is a national and institutional police force of the Republic of Uruguay, founded on December 18, 1829. It depends on the Executive Power through the Ministry of the Interior. Its assigned responsibility is to ensure compliance of laws in its population and to prevent crimes.

== Creation ==
On December 18, 1829, the Constitutional and Legislative Assembly of the Eastern State created the office of Political Chief in each of the nine departments. Standing as Political and Police Chief in the whole national territory, Colonel Don Ignacio Oribe.

== Structure ==
The Director of the National Police is the fourth in command in the Ministry of the Interior. The following police units depend on the National Police Directorate:

- National Directorate of Police Education (Dirección Nacional de la Educación Policial)
- National Aviation Directorate of the National Police (Dirección Nacional de Aviación de la Policía Nacional)
- National Directorate of Gender Policies (Dirección Nacional de Políticas de Género)
- National Directorate of Police Health (Dirección Nacional de Sanidad Policial)
- National Directorate of Police Assistance and Social Security (Dirección Nacional de Asistencia y Seguridad Social Policial)
- National Fire Department (Dirección Nacional de Bomberos)
- National Rehabilitation Institute (Instituto Nacional de Rehabilitación)
- National Directorate of Support for the Released (Dirección Nacional de Apoyo al Liberado)
- National Directorate of Civil Identification (Dirección Nacional de Identificación Civil)
- National Directorate of Migration (Dirección Nacional de Migración)
- National Highway Police Directorate (Dirección Nacional de Policía de Caminera)
- National Scientific Police Directorate (Dirección Nacional de Policía Científica)
- Directorate of Investigations of the National Police (Dirección de Investigaciones de la Policía Nacional)
- General Directorate for the Fight against Organized Crime and INTERPOL (Dirección General de Lucha contra el Crimen Organizado e INTERPOL)
- General Directorate for the Repression of Illicit Drug Trafficking (Dirección General de Represión al Tráfico Ilícito de Drogas)
- National Directorate of Information and Intelligence (Dirección Nacional de Información e Inteligencia)
- National Directorate Republican Guard (Dirección Nacional Guardia Republicana)

== Equipment ==
=== Ground vehicles ===
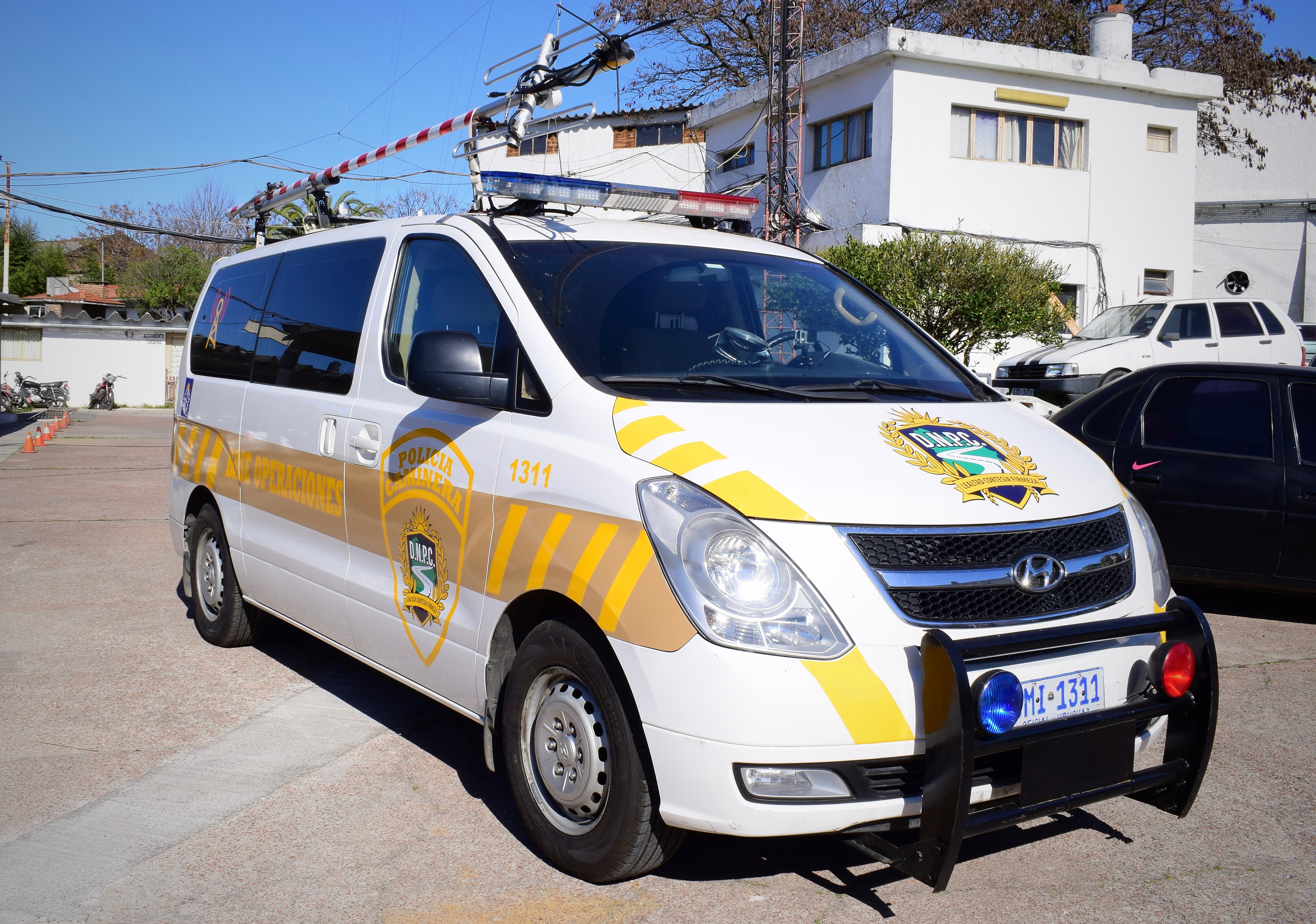
Highway patrol van (Policía Caminera)

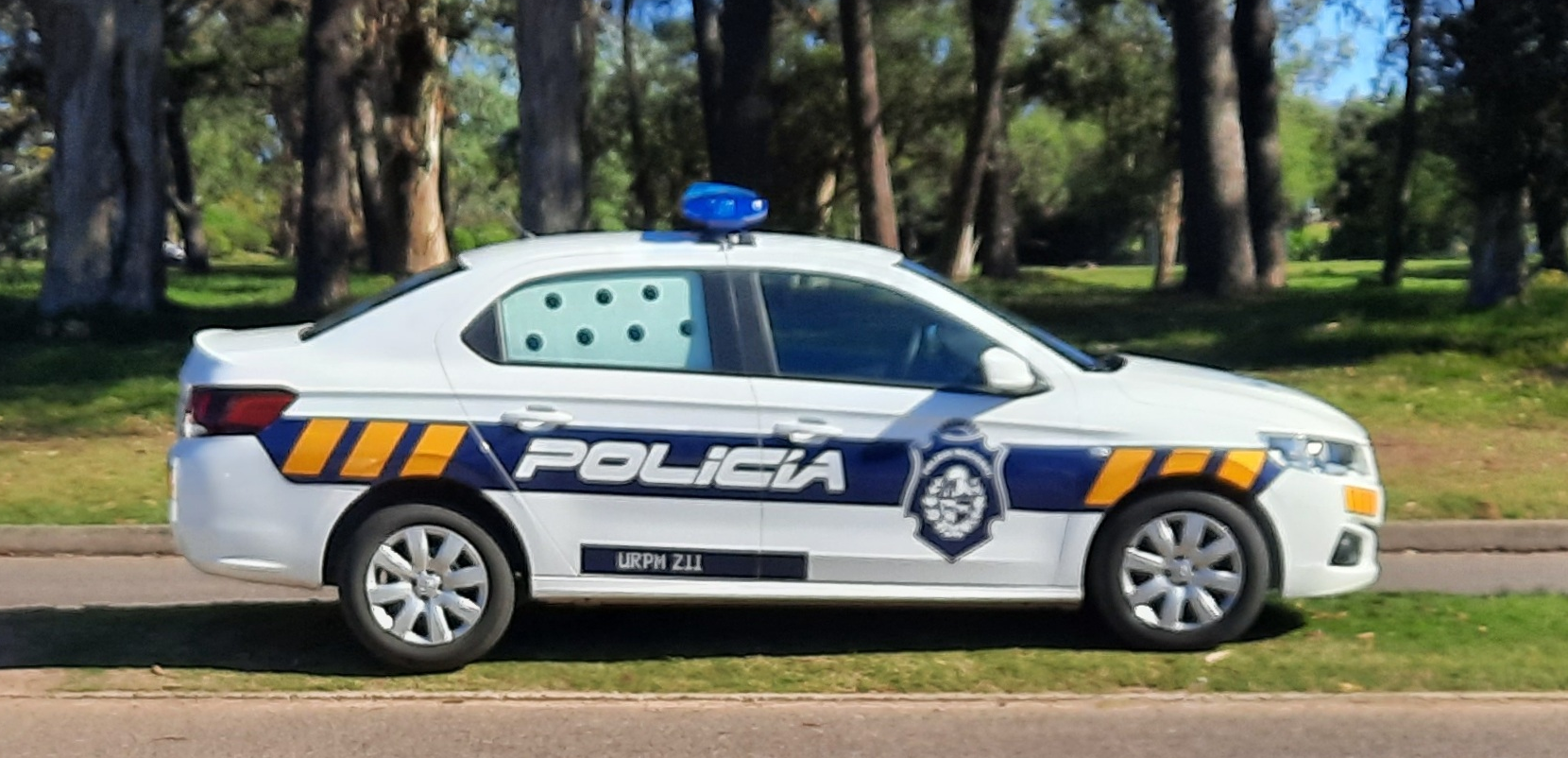
Peugeot 301 patrol vehicle

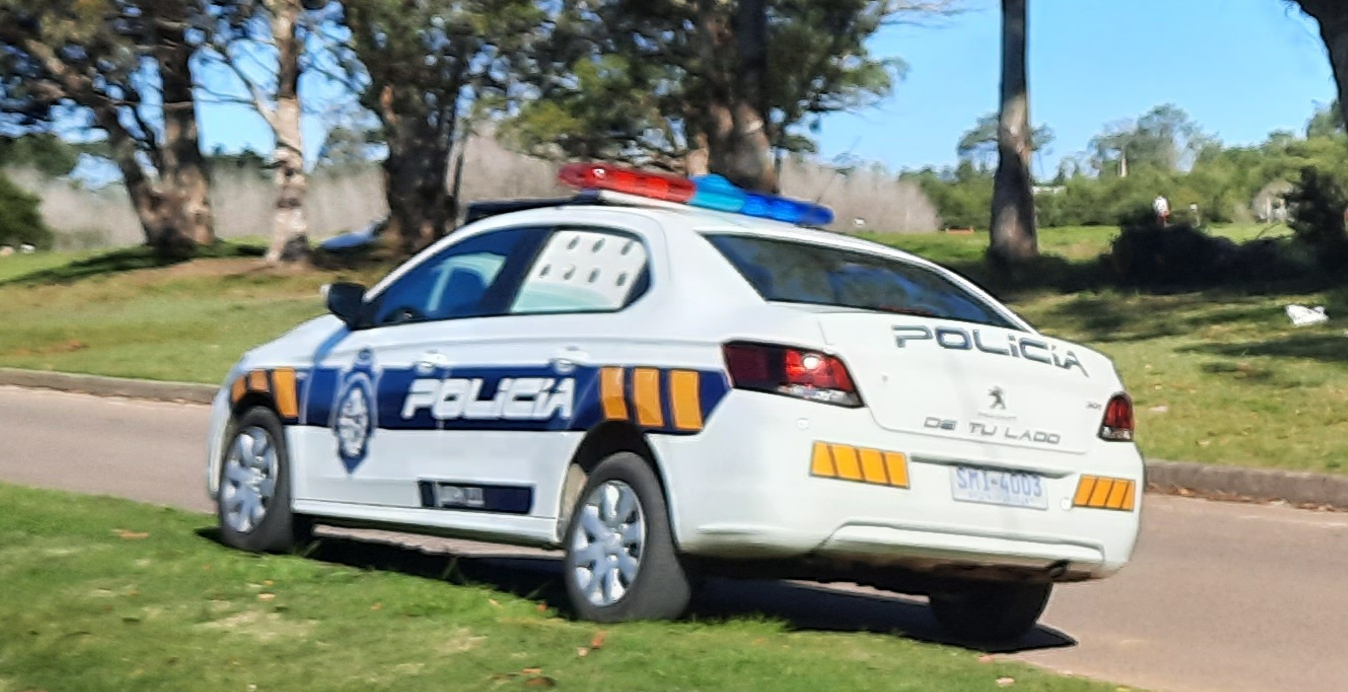
Peugeot 301 patrol vehicle (back view)

Commonly used vehicles:

Vehicle	Origin	Type	In service
Hyundai Starex	South Korea	Transport	Unknown
Toyota Hilux	Japan	Patrol	Unknown
Nissan Navara	Japan	Patrol	Unknown
Fiat Siena	Italy	Patrol	Unknown
Peugeot 301	France	Patrol	Unknown
Chevrolet Sail	United States	Patrol	Unknown
Mitsubishi Mirage (LA MY15)	Japan	Patrol	Unknown
Mitsubishi L200	Japan	Patrol	Unknown
JAC Refine S2	China	Patrol	Unknown

=== Motorcycles ===
Commonly used motorbikes:

Vehicle	Origin	Type	In service
KTM Adventure	Austria	Patrol	Unknown

=== Aircraft units ===
The unit's current inventory includes the following:

Aircraft	Origin	Type	In service
Robinson R66	United States	Policing	4
Cessna 182	United States	Policing	1

=== Weapons ===
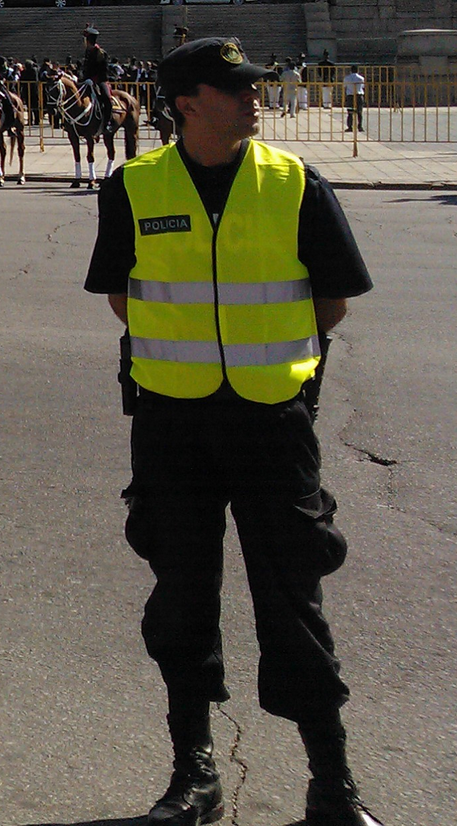
Uruguayan police officer in the daily work uniform

Firearms used by the National Police in its different departments:

Weapon	Origin	Type	User
Glock 17	Austria	Semi-automatic pistol	Standard issue
Glock 19	Austria	Semi-automatic pistol	Standard issue
Heckler & Koch USP	Germany	Semi-automatic pistol	Standard issue
Heckler & Koch MP5	Germany	Submachine gun	Standard issue
PP19-02-Vityaz SN	Russia	Submachine gun	Republican Guard
IWI Tavor X95	Israel	Submachine gun	Republican Guard
Remington 870	USA	Shotgun	Standard issue
AK101	Russia	Assault rifle	National Guard
AK103	Russia	Assault rifle	Republican Guard
M4 carbine	USA	Assault rifle	Republican Guard
Heckler & Koch PSG1	Germany	Sniper rifle	Standard issue

=== Uniform ===
The daily work uniform consists of dark blue cloth combat pants with a dark blue shirt or a long-sleeved button-down shirt, black boots, a plain baseball cap with the national police logo and the bulletproof vest on top. Officers may also wear a reflective vest or winter jacket that says "police" on the back.

=== Other equipment ===
Some officers also have body cameras.
