= Mauricio Rosencof =

Uruguayan poet and journalist (born 1933)

- Mauricio Rosencof en 2023.
- Born: Mauricio Rosencof; June 30, 1933 (age 93); Florida, Uruguay
- Occupations: Journalist, writer
- Political party: Broad Front
- Awards: Premio Bartolomé Hidalgo; Wings Award

Mauricio Rosencof (born June 30, 1933) is a Uruguayan playwright, poet and journalist from Florida, Uruguay. From 2005 to 2020 he has been Director of Culture of the Municipality of Montevideo.

He was a founder of the Communist Youth Union and leader of the National Liberation Movement (Tupamaros) (MLN-T) and in 1972 was arrested and tortured. After the coup of 1973 he was held "hostage" with eight more prisoners. After twelve years in prison, he was released in 1985. He has written several books. One of them, El regreso del Gran Tuleque, inspired the film El chevrolé. His 12-year tenure in prison with Eleuterio Fernández Huidobro and José Mujica was the basis for the film A Twelve-Year Night.

He lives in Montevideo.

== Works ==
- Medio mundo (2009)
- Una gondola anclo en la esquina (2007)
- El barrio era una fiesta (2005)
- Leyendas del abuelo de la tarde (2004)
- Las cartas que no llegaron (2000)
- La margarita. Historia de amor en 25 sonetos (1994)
- El Vendedor de Reliquias (1992)
- Memorias del calabozo (1989, with Eleuterio Fernández Huidobro)
- El hijo que espera (1988)
- El regreso del Gran Tuleque (1987)
- El lujo que espera (1986)
- El combate del establo (1985)
- El saco de Antonio (1985)
- Los caballos (1967)
- Las ranas (1961)
- La valija (1961)
- El gran Tuleque (1960)
