= Henry Engler =

Uruguayan neuroscientist

Henry Willy Engler Golovchenko (born 1946 in Paysandú) is a Uruguayan neuroscientist.

Student at the University of the Republic, he obtained his BA-level degree in 1970.

During the late 1960s and early 1970s he was a prominent member of the Tupamaros. The historic Tupamaro leader Henry Engler admitted his responsibility in the execution of rural worker Pascasio Báez by the MLN-T, which took place in the department of Maldonado in December 1971. He spent 13 years in jail during the civic-military dictatorship of Uruguay.

Later he emigrated to Sweden, where he obtained his PhD at the University of Uppsala. In 2002 he injected for the first time in healthy volunteers and Alzheimer's patients the substance PIB (Pittsburgh compound B) to detect amyloid plaques in the brain. The results were presented at the World Alzheimer's Conference in Stockholm.
