= Michael Otterman =

Michael Otterman is a freelance journalist and documentary filmmaker based in New York City and Sydney. He graduated from Boston University, with a BSc in journalism, and from the University of Sydney with a MLitt (PACS) where he is a visiting scholar at the Centre for Peace and Conflict Studies (CPACS).

== Book ==
In March 2007, his first book American Torture: From the Cold War to Abu Ghraib and Beyond was published by Melbourne University Publishing (MUP). He toured, promoting the book from June to October 2007. In October 2007, he gave a talk at New York University.

As Dennis Altman wrote in The Age, "Otterman writes as a patriot - one who expects much of his country and is angry when it fails him." Television appearances in 2007 included The Tavis Smiley Show, BBC World News, and JTV, ABC Australia.

== Blog ==
Michael Otterman also ran a blog, American Torture, which was intended to "provide a venue for discussions about America's use of torture and feature updates about the fate of the over 10,000 'enemy combatants' and 'security detainees' held across the globe in secret CIA prisons and in places like Guantanamo Bay, Cuba and Bagram Air Base in Afghanistan."

He is currently, as of 2010, working on a forthcoming publication Collateral Carnage: The Human Cost of the War in Iraq, coauthored with Dr Richard Hil and Dr Paul Wilson.

== NorCor Management ==
Michael Otterman is a partner at NorCor Manager, a business that runs in his family. This family-run business in Queens manages an expanding portfolio of cooperatives, condos, and rental properties.

== Publications ==
- Sensory deprivation just another name for torture
- Michael Otterman: Why CIA abuse is medieval madness
- Hitchens's tortured explanation
- Between Iraq and a Hard Place
- American Torture: From the Cold War to Abu Ghraib and Beyond.
- Michael Otterman, Richard Hil, Paul Wilson, Dahr Jamail (2010), Erasing Iraq: The Human Costs Of Carnage, ISBN 978-0-7453-2897-3
