= Tupamaros =

Marxist–Leninist urban guerrilla group in Uruguay (1967–72)

Tupamaros – National Liberation Movement Movimiento de Liberación Nacional – Tupamaros
- Tupamaros – National Liberation Movement Flag
- Leaders: Raúl Sendic; Eleuterio Fernández Huidobro; Héctor Amodio Pérez; Henry Engler; Mauricio Rosencof
- Dates active: 1967–1972
- Active regions: Uruguay
- Ideology: Communism; Marxism-Leninism; Guevarism; Foco theory; Left-wing nationalism; Revolutionary socialism
- Political position: Far-left
- Status: Defunct

The National Liberation Movement – Tupamaros (Spanish: Movimiento de Liberación Nacional – Tupamaros, MLN-T) was a Marxist–Leninist urban guerrilla group that operated in Uruguay during the 1960s and 1970s. It was responsible for numerous violent incidents involving left-wing terrorist activities. In 1989, the group was admitted into the Broad Front and a large number of its members joined the Movement of Popular Participation (MPP).

Formed in the early 1960s, the MLN-T sought to create a revolutionary state through armed struggle, taking inspiration from the 1953-59 Cuban Revolution led by Fidel Castro. However, unlike the latter, it conducted its operations in urban areas. The organization gained notoriety for its violent acts of sabotage, bank and armory robberies, assassinations of military and police officers, bombings, and kidnappings of judges, businessmen, diplomats and politicians.

The MLN-T is inextricably linked to its most important leader, Raúl Sendic, and his brand of Marxist politics. José Mujica, who later became President of Uruguay, was also a member. 300 Tupamaros died either in action or in prisons (mostly in 1972), according to officials of the group. About 3,000 Tupamaros were also imprisoned.

== History ==
=== Background ===
Due to the reforms implemented at the beginning of the 20th century during the Batlle era, Uruguay became one of the most prosperous nations in Latin America. Since then, the country has maintained a robust welfare state, progressive social and labor laws, and a high quality of life, earning it the nickname 'The Switzerland of the Americas'. Additionally, since the mid-19th century, Uruguay has experienced a massive wave of European migration, particularly from Italians and Spaniards, who significantly shaped its culture and society.

During both World Wars, the Uruguayan economy was significantly boosted by the sale of raw materials to countries involved in the conflicts. However, from the mid-1950s onward, as global demand for agricultural products declined and Europe underwent reconstruction, exports fell, leading to a severe economic crisis. The Tupamaros emerged during this period of instability, attracting professionals, workers, trade unionists, and students. Unlike other guerrilla groups formed during the Cold War, the MLN-T was primarily composed of revolutionary leftist individuals from the upper-middle and upper classes.

=== Origins ===
According to one of its top members, Eleuterio Fernández Huidobro, the formal founding of the MLN-T took place in 1965; however, the organization's first action was the theft of weapons and ammunition from the Tiro Suizo, a shooting range in Nueva Helvecia, in 1963. A year earlier, nursing student Dora Isabel López de Oricchio was shot dead during an assault on the headquarters of a union association, carried out by a group led by Raúl Sendic Antonaccio. This event is considered one of the earliest acts attributed to far-left violence.

At the outset, the organization did not operate under its name, instead operating in a more anonymous manner. In November 1964, leaflets were circulated for the first time that read TNT: Tupamaros no transamos. 'Transamos'—the first-person plural form of the verb 'transar'—is slang from the lunfardo of Uruguayan Spanish, used to mean 'compromise' or 'settle.' It often carries a negative connotation, implying a refusal to compromise on principles or values. The organization was named after the revolutionary Túpac Amaru II, who in 1780 led a major indigenous revolt against the Viceroyalty of Peru.

In August 1965, the organization issued a leaflet under its name for the first time, claiming responsibility for an explosion at the entrance to the Bayer company's headquarters in Montevideo.

=== Activity ===
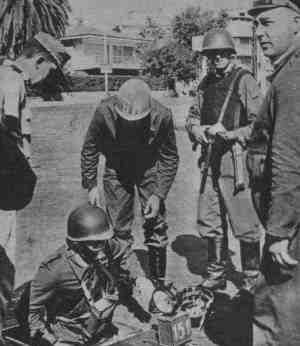
Police operation taking place to inspect the sewers in Montevideo, which were used by MLN-T members to move around the city.

The movement began by staging the robbing of banks, gun clubs and other businesses in the early 1960s, then distributing stolen food and money among the poor in Montevideo. It took as its slogan, "Words divide us; action unites us."

Later on as the Tupamaros grew, they helped develop the 'Frente Amplio' political coalition, serving as the counterpart to their underground organization. The Frente Amplio combined leftist and centre-left views.

At the beginning, it abstained from armed actions and violence, acting not as a guerrilla group but a political movement. In June 1968, President Jorge Pacheco, trying to suppress labour unrest, enforced a state of emergency and repealed all constitutional safeguards. The government imprisoned political dissidents, used torture during interrogations, and brutally repressed demonstrations. In 1969 the Tupamaros conducted the largest robbery in Uruguayan history and occupied the city of Pando. They then began engaging in political kidnappings, "armed propaganda" and assassinations. Of particular note were the kidnapping of powerful bank manager Ulysses Pereira Reverbel and of the British ambassador to Uruguay, Geoffrey Jackson, as well as the assassination of Dan Mitrione, a U.S. FBI agent also working for the CIA (via the Agency for International Development's Office of Public Safety), who the Tupamaros learned was advising the Uruguayan police in torture and other security work.

The Tupamaros peaked as a guerrilla group in 1970 and 1971. During this period they made liberal use of their Cárcel del Pueblo (or People's Prison) where they held those that they kidnapped and interrogated them, before making the results of these interviews public. A number of these hostages were later ransomed for considerable sums of money, including the Brazilian Consul in Montevideo, Aloysio Dias Gomide. In September 1971 over 100 imprisoned Tupamaros escaped the Punta Carretas prison by digging a hole across their cells and then a tunnel that led from the floor of one ground-level cell to the living room of a nearby home. As a result of this, the government summoned the military to prepare a counter-insurgency campaign to suppress the MLN.

=== End ===
Nonetheless, in 1972 the group was quickly crippled by a series of events. First, it had started to engage in political violence since 1970, a choice that weakened its popular support. Second, the group responded to the assassination and/or disappearance of four Tupamaros on the part of illegal parapolice squads with a wave of high-profile assassinations that concentrated political opposition against them. Later on, the MLN directly attacked the military and killed a number of soldiers. The army's response was swift; it included the heavy use of torture and the flipping of high-ranking Tupamaros, including Héctor Amodio Pérez, towards collaborating with them.

The Tupamaros collapsed in mid-1972, with the army killing many of them and capturing a majority of the rest. Shortly after defeating the MLN the military successively confronted the independence of the judiciary in October 1972, of the civilian executive branch in February 1973, and lastly the independence of the parliament in June 1973. On this latter occasion, it completed its coup d'état by deploying armored vehicles in the capital and shutting down the legislative branch by request of the Uruguayan President. Nine Tupamaros were specially chosen to remain in squalid conditions, including Raúl Sendic Antonaccio, Julio Marenales, Eleuterio Fernández Huidobro, José Mujica, Henry Engler, Jorge Zabalza, Adolfo Wasem, Jorge Manera and Mauricio Rosencof. They remained there until the restoration of liberal democracy in Uruguay in 1985. During the intervening years, the military regime killed and "disappeared" additional numbers of people, focusing particularly on the Communist Party of Uruguay.

In 1984, a set of several 24-hour Uruguayan general strikes, eventually forced the military to accept civilian rule, with democratic elections held that year. Under Julio María Sanguinetti, the new president, amnesty was granted to the Tupamaros and to the militaries. The Tupamaros were released from prison after over a decade and they joined in representing the Frente Amplio coalition party. In 2004, Tabaré Vásquez was the first to become president on the "Frente Amplio" ticket. The ceramicist and former member, Eva Díaz Torres, returned to Uruguay during this period.

== List of attacks ==
- 8 October 1969 – taking of Pando.
- 31 July 1970 – kidnapping of U.S. government official, Dan Mitrione, who trained Uruguayan police. He was murdered on 10 August.
- 31 July 1970 – kidnapping of the Brazilian consul Aloysio Dias Gomide, released on 21 February 1971 for ransom ($250,000).
- 7 August 1970 – the kidnapping of U.S. agronomist Dr. Claude Fly, released on 2 March 1971 after a health crisis following a heart attack inside the People's Prison.
- 29 September 1970 – bombing of the Carrasco Bowling Club, gravely injuring the elderly caretaker Hilaria Ibarra (rescued from the rubble by Gustavo Zerbino who would later be a survivor of the Andes disaster).
- 8 January 1971 – the kidnapping of the British ambassador Geoffrey Jackson.
- 21 December 1971 – killing of rural laborer Pascasio Báez by sodium pentothal injection.
- 14 April 1972 - several members of the paramilitary death squads were killed, after the abduction of a member of the group revealed its existence and government involvement.
- 18 May 1972 – four Uruguayan Army soldiers killed by machine gun fire while watching over the house of the commander-in-chief of the Army, General Florencio Gravina.

== Notable members ==
- The Uruguayan "nine hostages" kept under arrest between 1972 and 1985:
  - Raúl Sendic – Founder and leader of the group. Famous for his self-effacing, timid nature.
  - Eleuterio Fernández Huidobro – Became a prominent politician beginning in the mid-1990s. Ministry of National Defense in 2011 until his death. On August 5, 2016, he died in office at the age of 74.
  - José Mujica – President of Uruguay from 2010 to 2015 and leader of the Movement of Popular Participation.
  - Mauricio Rosencof – Became a prominent writer and playwright after leaving prison. Director of Culture of the Intendancy of Montevideo in 2005.
  - Henry Engler – Left for Sweden post-prison and became a prominent medical researcher.
  - Adolfo Wasem – Died of cancer before liberation.
  - Jorge Zabalza – The youngest of the "nine hostages". Famous in Uruguay for his continued radical militancy well into his later years, as well as his criticism of his fellow ex-Tupamaros. Died on February 23, 2022.
  - Julio Marenales
  - Jorge Manera
- Héctor Amodio Pérez – The only prominent and founding member of the Tupamaros who organized the escape from Punta Carretas prison. He fled to Spain in 1973 and only resurfaced in the public eye in 2013.
- Lucía Topolansky – First female vice-president of Uruguay from 2017 to 2020. Married José Mujica in 2005, after decades of living together.

== See also ==
- 1973 Uruguayan general strike
- Juventud Uruguaya de Pie
- Movement of Popular Participation
- Taking of Pando
