= Raúl Sendic =

Uruguayan Marxist lawyer and trade unionist

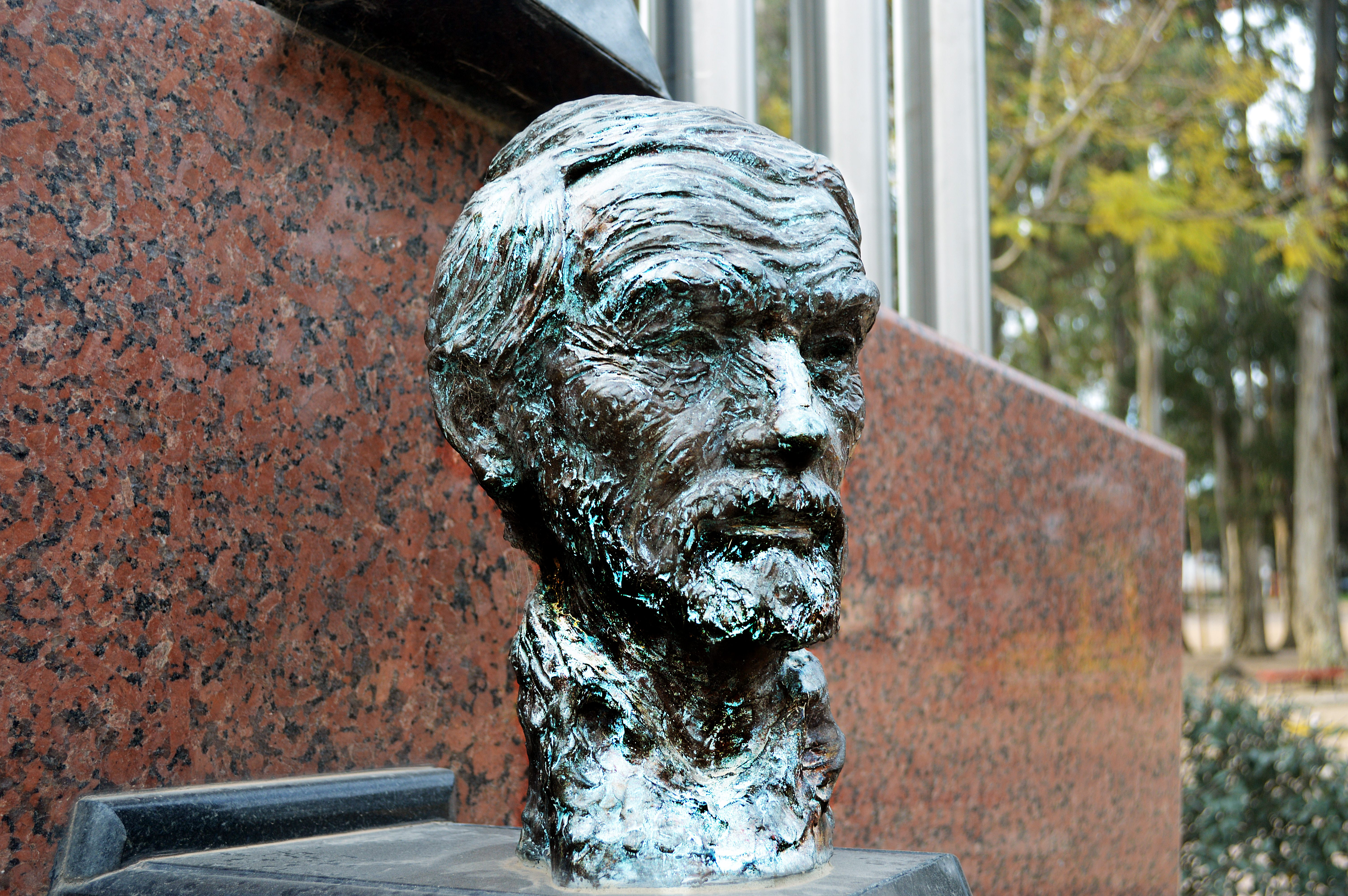
- Monument to Sendic in Trinidad, Uruguay
- Born: 16 March 1926; Flores, Uruguay
- Died: 28 April 1989 (aged 63); Paris, France
- Resting place: Cementerio de La Teja, Montevideo
- Other name: "Bebe"
- Education: University of the Republic
- Occupations: Lawyer, trade unionist
- Organization: National Liberation Movement – Tupamaros
- Children: Raúl Fernando Sendic Rodríguez (son)

Raúl Sendic Antonaccio (March 16, 1926 – April 28, 1989) was a Uruguayan lawyer, trade unionist and founder of the National Liberation Movement – Tupamaros (MLN–T). After beginning his legal career organising agricultural workers and agitating for land reform, he moved into militant activism and established the MLN–T to carry out urban guerrilla warfare against the Uruguayan state. He was arrested and imprisoned by the civic-military dictatorship of Uruguay, only being released after the transition to democracy. As the Tupamaros shifted once more to legal, political activities, Sendic died from amyotrophic lateral sclerosis (ALS).

== Biography ==
Raúl Sendic Antonaccio was born on 16 March 1926, into a peasant family in the Flores Department. After studying law and joining the Socialist Party of Uruguay, during the 1950s, he worked as a lawyer for rural trade unions and founded a number himself, organising sugarcane workers in the Artigas Department. He also led demonstrations in the capital of Montevideo, calling for an eight-hour day and land reform under the motto "For the land and with Sendic" (Spanish: "Por la tierra y con Sendic"), but the protests were repressed.

During the 1960s, Sendic established the National Liberation Movement (Spanish: Movimiento de Liberación Nacional; MLN), commonly known as the Tupamaros, a militant urban guerrilla movement. Declaring war on the Uruguayan government and its U.S. support, the Tupamaros carried out attacks that gradually increased in magnitude. They first began by robbing banks and gun stores, but they then began to move to kidnappings, bombings, takeovers of police and military installations, and assassination of Uruguayan and foreign officials. These political targets included Dan Mitrione, an FBI agent alleged to have taught techniques of torture to police forces in various Latin American countries. On 7 August 1970, Sendic was arrested and imprisoned in Punta Carretas, but he and over 100 other Tupamaros prisoners managed to escape through a tunnel the following month. He remained in the country to continue leading the Tupamaros. Two years later, he was arrested again; he and eight other Tupamaros leaders were held in solitary confinement for 12 years by the civic-military dictatorship of Uruguay. In November 1979, Sendic's wife, Violeta Setelich, submitted a complaint to the United Nations Human Rights Committee on his behalf, alleging breaches of the International Covenant on Civil and Political Rights (ICCPR), a treaty to which Uruguay is a party. In October 1981, the Committee found that Uruguay violated articles 7, 9, 10, and 14 of the ICCPR in respect of Sendic during his trial and imprisonment.

After the transition to democracy, an amnesty was proclaimed and Sendic was released. Together with other Tupamaros leaders, he established the Movement of Popular Participation (MPP) to achieve their goals legally and politically. During the late 1980s, Sendic travelled to Cuba and Europe, as a political representative of the Tupamaros. By this time, his health began to decline as he succumbed to amyotrophic lateral sclerosis (ALS), from which he died on 28 April 1989. He was buried in La Teja, on 8 May 1989.

== See also ==
- List of political families § Uruguay
