= Eleuterio Fernández Huidobro =

Uruguayan politician and writer (1942–2016)

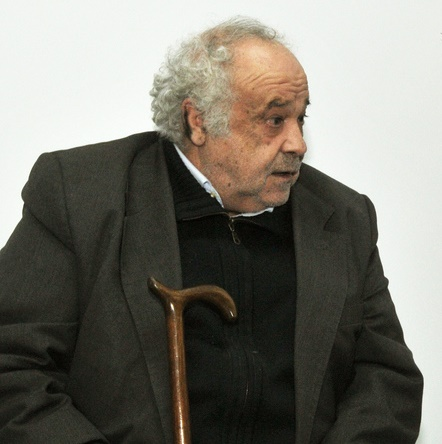
- Fernández Huidobro in 2013

Minister of Defence of Uruguay
- In office July 18, 2011 – August 5, 2016
- President: José Mujica; Tabaré Vázquez
- Preceded by: Luis Rosadilla
- Succeeded by: Jorge Menendez

Personal details
- Born: March 14, 1942 Montevideo, Uruguay
- Died: August 5, 2016 (aged 74) Montevideo, Uruguay
- Political party: Broad Front

Eleuterio Fernández Huidobro (March 14, 1942 – August 5, 2016) was an Uruguayan politician, journalist, and writer. He was popularly known as "El Ñato". A former member of the National Liberation Movement (Tupamaros) (MLN-T), he was in prison during the military dictatorship for twelve years (1973-1985).

He was the Minister of Defense from 2011 until his death. On August 5, 2016, he died in office at the age of 74.

His 12-year tenure in prison during Uruguay's military dictatorship with Mauricio Rosencof and José Mujica was the basis for the film A Twelve-Year Night, in which he was portrayed by Alfonso Tort.
