= Gerardo Fregossi =

Uruguayan Army general (born 1963)

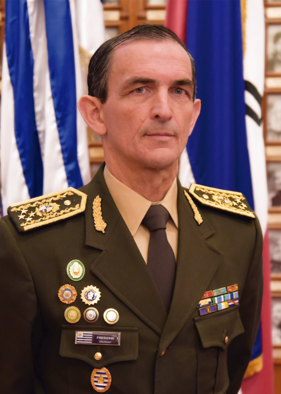
- Fregossi in 2020

Commander-in-chief of the National Army
- In office 4 March 2020 – 31 January 2023
- President: Luis Lacalle Pou
- Preceded by: Claudio Feola
- Succeeded by: Mario Stevenazzi

Personal details
- Born: Gerardo Daniel Fregossi Álvarez; 24 March 1963 (age 63) Mercedes, Uruguay
- Children: 2
- Education: Uruguay Military School

Military service
- Allegiance: Uruguay
- Branch/service: Uruguayan Army
- Years of service: 1982-2023
- Rank: Army General

Gerardo Daniel Fregossi Álvarez (born 24 March 1963) is a retired Uruguayan Army general who served as the commander in chief of the National Army of Uruguay from 2020 to 2023. He previously served as commander of Batallón Uruguay IV during its deployment to the Democratic Republic of the Congo and later as headmaster of the Liceo Militar General Artigas.

== Early life and education ==
Fregossi was born on 24 March 1963 in Mercedes, Soriano Department. He completed his primary and secondary education in public schools and at the Liceo Militar “33 Orientales” in Colonia del Sacramento.

He enrolled in the Military School in 1979 and graduated as an Alférez of the Infantry on 21 December 1982. He later completed the Staff Officer Course and a course in Research Methodology in Military Sciences at the Military Institute of Advanced Studies, as well as the Command and General Staff course at the Western Hemisphere Institute for Security Cooperation.
