= Mario Stevenazzi =

Uruguayan Army general (born 1965)

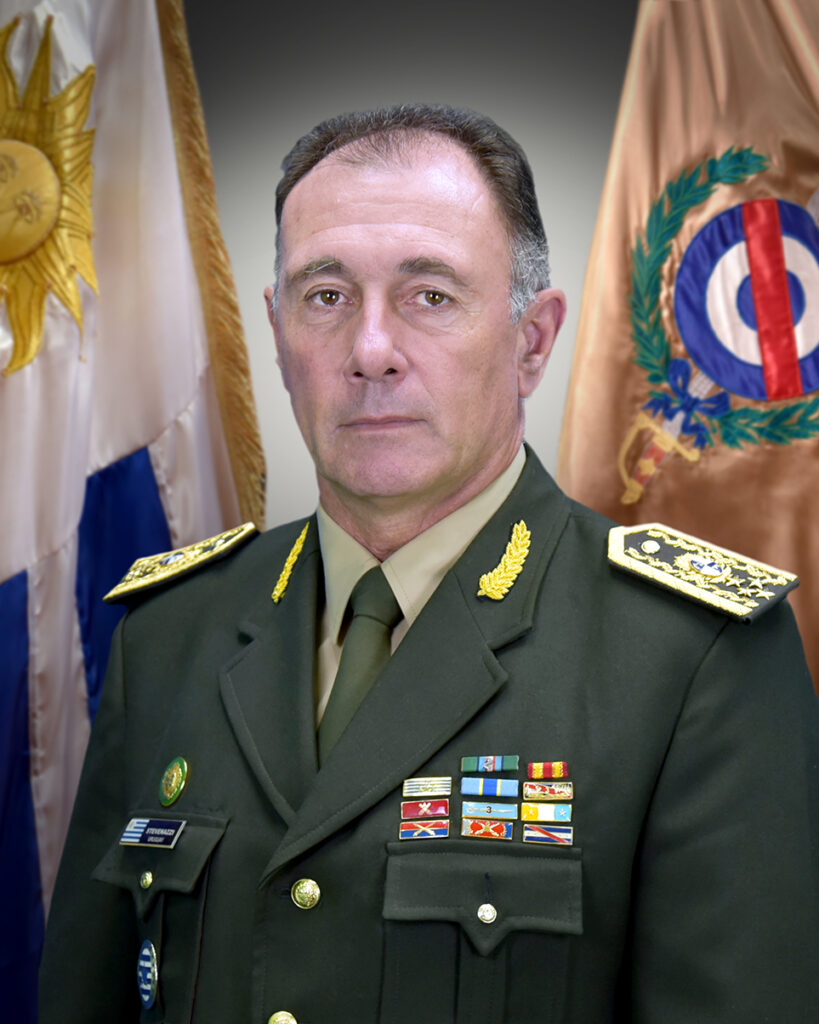
- Stevenazzi in 2023

Commander-in-chief of the National Army
- Incumbent
- Assumed office 1 February 2023
- President: Luis Lacalle Pou
- Preceded by: Gerardo Fregossi

Personal details
- Born: Mario Rafael Stevenazzi Viñas; 20 March 1965 (age 61) Las Piedras, Uruguay
- Children: 1
- Education: Uruguay Military School

Military service
- Allegiance: Uruguay
- Branch/service: Uruguayan Army
- Years of service: 1986-present
- Rank: Army General

Mario Rafael Stevenazzi Viñas (born 20 March 1965) is a Uruguayan Army general who has served as the commander in chief of the National Army of Uruguay since 1 February 2023.

== Early life and education ==
Born in Las Piedras and raised in Progreso, Canelones Department, Stevenazzi comes from a family of Italian descent. He attended public schools in his hometown and the Minas Military Lyceum. He enrolled in the Uruguay Military School in 1983, and graduated in December 1986 as an Alférez of the Artillery. He also completed the Staff Officer Course and a bachelor's degree in military sciences from the Military Institute of Advanced Studies.

== Career ==
After graduating from the Military School, he was assigned for four years to the 3rd Artillery Battalion in Paso de los Toros, Tacuarembó Department. In 1991 he was assigned as section chief of the Anti-Aircraft Defense Artillery Group No. 1 located in the town of Salinas, Canelones Department. Four years later, he was appointed battery commander in the Artillery Group No. 4 in Minas. In 1999, having been promoted to the rank of major, he was appointed Second Chief of the Artillery Group No. 2 in the Flores Department. In 2002 he was appointed alternate member of the Competition Court for Promotion to the Artillery Corps.

In 2005 he assumed the position of Chief of the Artillery Group No. 5 in Montevideo. He also served as section chief in the “Uruguay I” Battalion of the United Nations Transitional Authority in Cambodia in 1991, and as head of the logistics cell of the “Uruguay IV” Battalion of the United Nations Organization Stabilization Mission in the Democratic Republic of the Congo for two years.

On 1 February 2008, he was promoted to the rank of colonel and from then until May 2009, he served for the second time in the United Nations Organization Stabilization Mission in the Democratic Republic of the Congo but as a military observer. In 2010, he was appointed an instructor officer at the Military Institute of Advanced Studies. He also served as head of the Army's Institutional Communication Department—Army spokesperson—as well as director of the Armed Forcers Retirement and Pension Service.

From March 2018 to mid-2019 he served as military attaché at the Uruguayan Embassy in the People's Republic of China. On February 1, 2019, he was promoted to the rank of Army General, and upon his return to the country he held the position of Chief of the Army General Staff. In 2018 he took office as Commander of the 1st. Army Division, the section that is in charge of the tasks carried out by the land branch of the Armed Forces in the Montevideo and Canelones departments. In February 2022, he succeeded General José Martínez as commander of the 3rd. Army Division in the Artigas, Paysandú, Río Negro, Rivera, Salto and Tacuarembó departments.

In mid-December 2022, the Ministry of National Defense announced the appointment of Stevenazzi to succeed Gerardo Fregossi as commander-in-chief of the Army, once the latter went into mandatory retirement. He took office on February 1, 2023. In January 2025, President-elect Yamandú Orsi confirmed that Stevenazzi would continue in office during his administration, until his mandatory retirement.
