= Agrale Marruá =

Brazilian Light Utility Vehicle

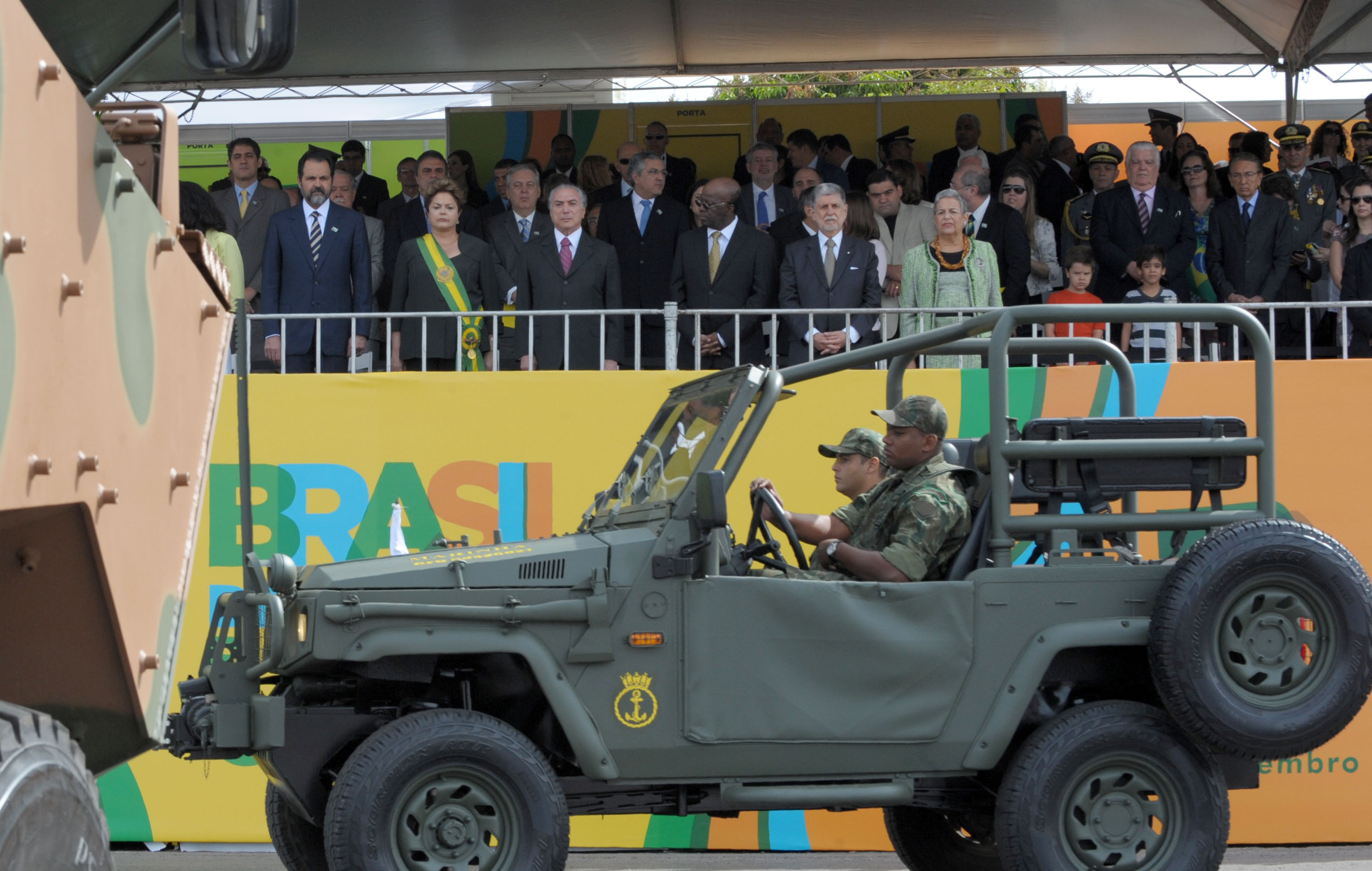
- Agrale Marruá in Brazilian Marine service.
- Type: Light Utility Vehicle
- Place of origin: Brazil

Service history
- In service: 2005–present
- Used by: See Operators

Production history
- Designer: Agrale
- Manufacturer: Agrale
- Produced: 2004–present

Specifications
- Mass: 2,460 kilograms (5,420 lb)
- Length: 3.8 metres (12 ft)
- Width: 1.92 metres (6.3 ft)
- Height: 1.95 metres (6.4 ft)
- Crew: 4-6
- Main armament: See text
- Engine: MWM turbocharged four-cylinder diesel 132 horsepower (98 kW)
- Suspension: Independent 4x4
- Operational range: 1,000 kilometres (620 mi)
- Maximum speed: 128 kilometres per hour (80 mph)

The Marruá ("Wild Bull") is a family of four-by-four wheeled transport and utility vehicles, built by Agrale in Caxias do Sul, Rio Grande do Sul, Brazil. Developed in the early 2000s to serve as a replacement for aging jeeps and other vehicles in Brazilian service (Bandeirante and JPX), it has also been adopted by several other South American armies, and is used on peacekeeping missions with the United Nations in Haiti.

== History ==
Following the bankruptcy of Engesa in early 1990, former employees of the company acquired the rights to the Engesa EE-4/EE-12 utility vehicle, and, working with the Agrale company, developed an improved version of the vehicle between 2003 and 2005 to meet a specification for a 1/2 ton, 4x4 Viatura de Transporte Não Especializada (Non-Specialised Transport Vehicle, VTNE) for the Armed Forces of Brazil, to replace the Jeeps previously in service. Three prototypes were constructed for testing by the Brazilian Army, with Agrale investing $11 million into the project, and the Marruá was accepted for Brazilian service on 27 July 2005.

== Design ==
Designed to be versatile, robust, and easy to maintain, the Marruá underwent over 60,000 miles (97,000 km) of testing during its development, and is capable of carrying four fully equipped soldiers, anti-tank missile launchers, recoilless rifles, machine guns, or communications equipment.

== Models ==
Current models of the Marruá are:

=== Military versions ===
Military 4x4's featuring MWM motors meeting Euro III standards.

  - Agrale Marruá AM2 VTNE ½ Ton (base four person two door Jeep-like vehicle with removable roof)
    - AM2 MB-NET is a specialised version for the Brazilian Marine Corps, with rust-resistant paint, high-flotation tires, and seating for six.
  - Agrale Marruá AM11/AM11 REC/VTNE/VTL REC (five person four door Jeep-like vehicle with removable roof)
  - Agrale Marruá AM20-VDC, a command and control vehicle.
  - Agrale Marruá AM20 and AM21 - Amb (ambulance for transporting wounded and may be single or removal of ICU equipment)
  - Agrale Marruá AM20 and AM21 - VCC (Special Car for command and control operations)
  - Agrale Marruá AM21 - VTNE ¾ Ton (pickup truck for personal transport or load 750 kg load with removable hood, metallic body with vinyl roof)
  - Agrale Marruá AM23 - VTNE ¾ Ton
  - Agrale Marruá AM23 CC/CDCC - VTNE ¾ Ton
  - Agrale Marruá AM31 - VTNE 1½ Ton (pickup truck)
  - Agrale Marruá AM41 - VTNE 2½ Ton (cabover tactical truck)
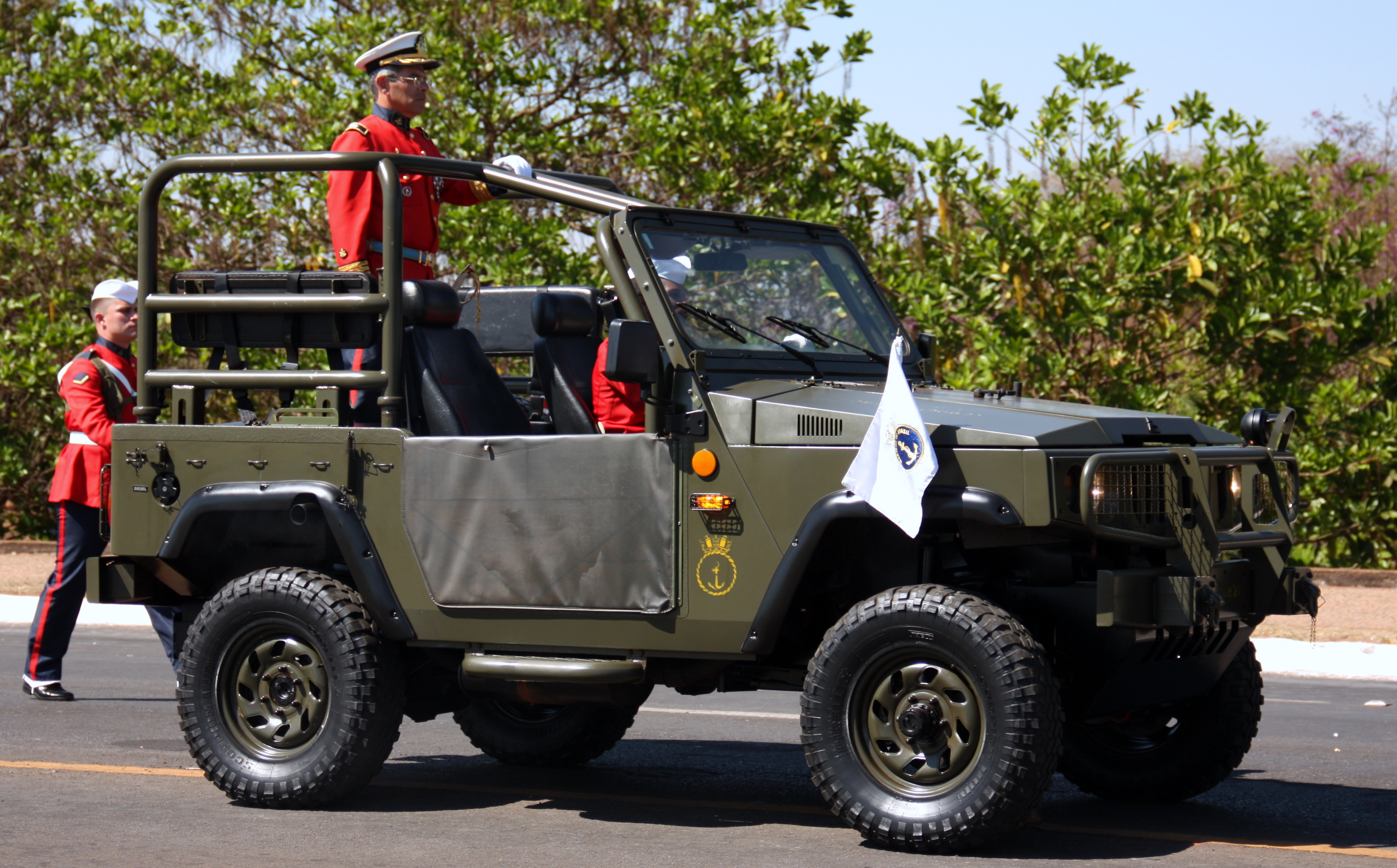
AM2 MB-NET is a specialised version for the Brazilian Marine Corps, with rust-resistant paint, high-flotation tires, and seating for six.

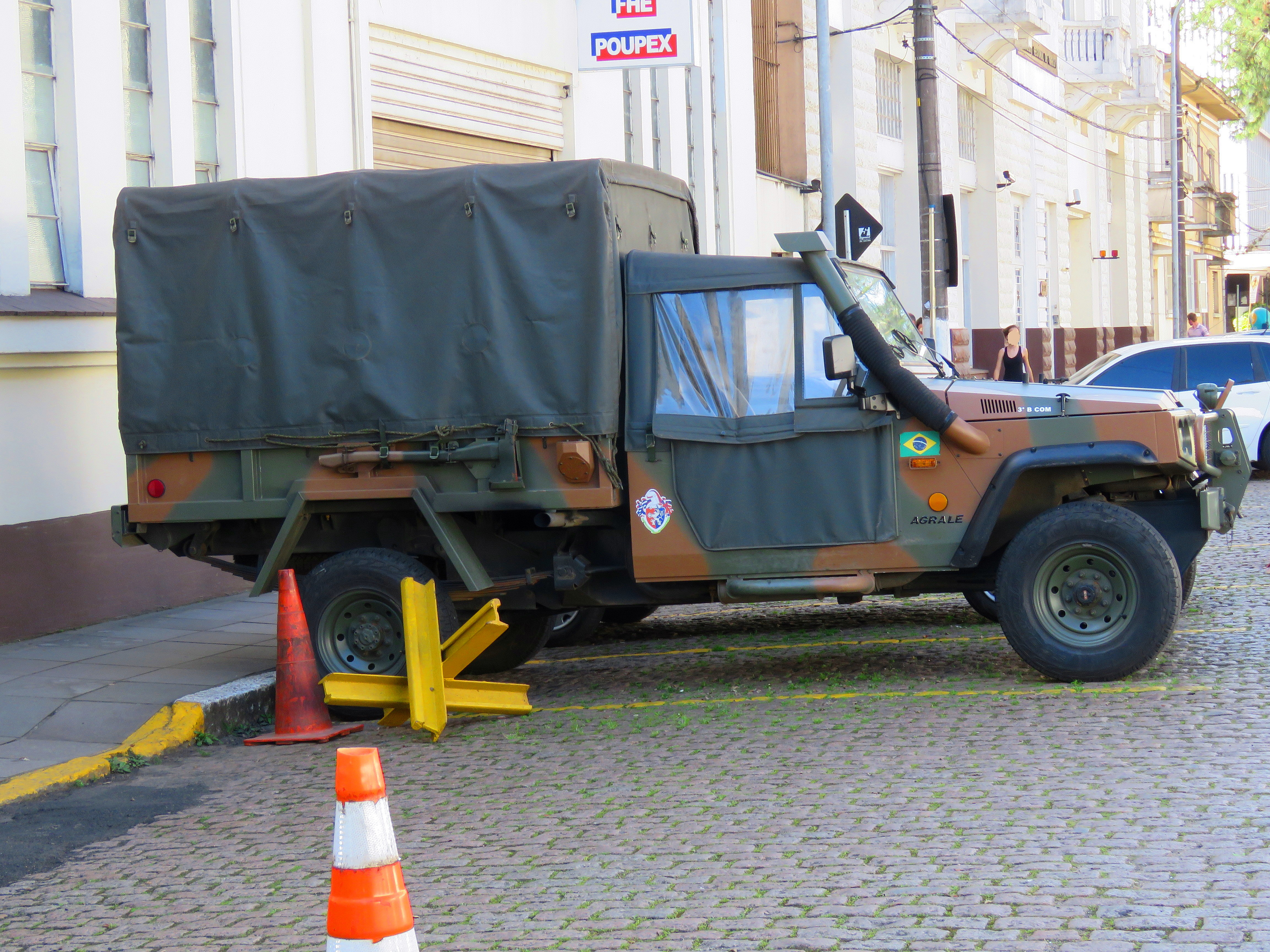
Agrale Marruá VTNE 3/4 ton in Porto Alegre.

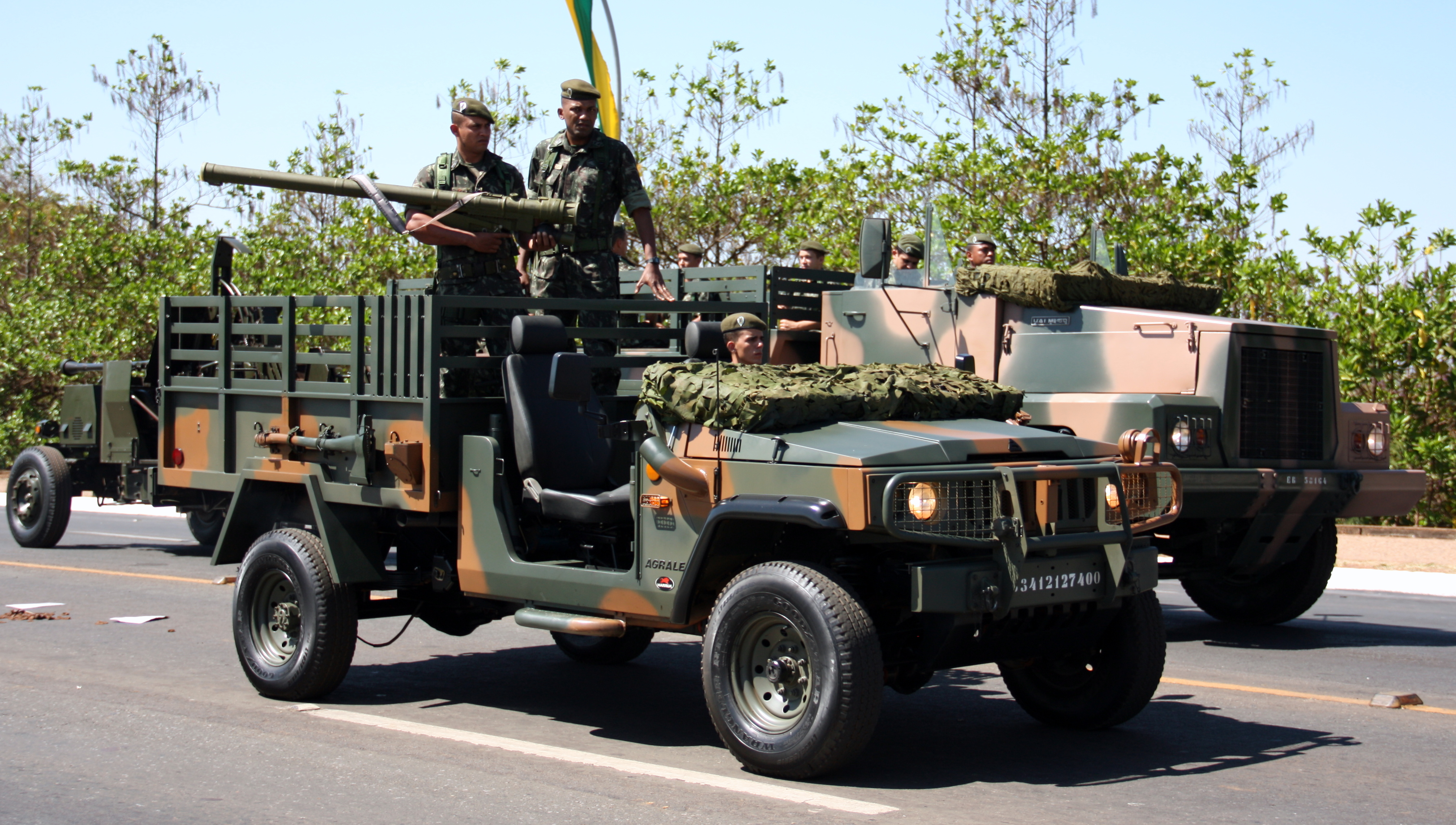
Agrale Marruá AM21 - VTNE ¾ Ton.

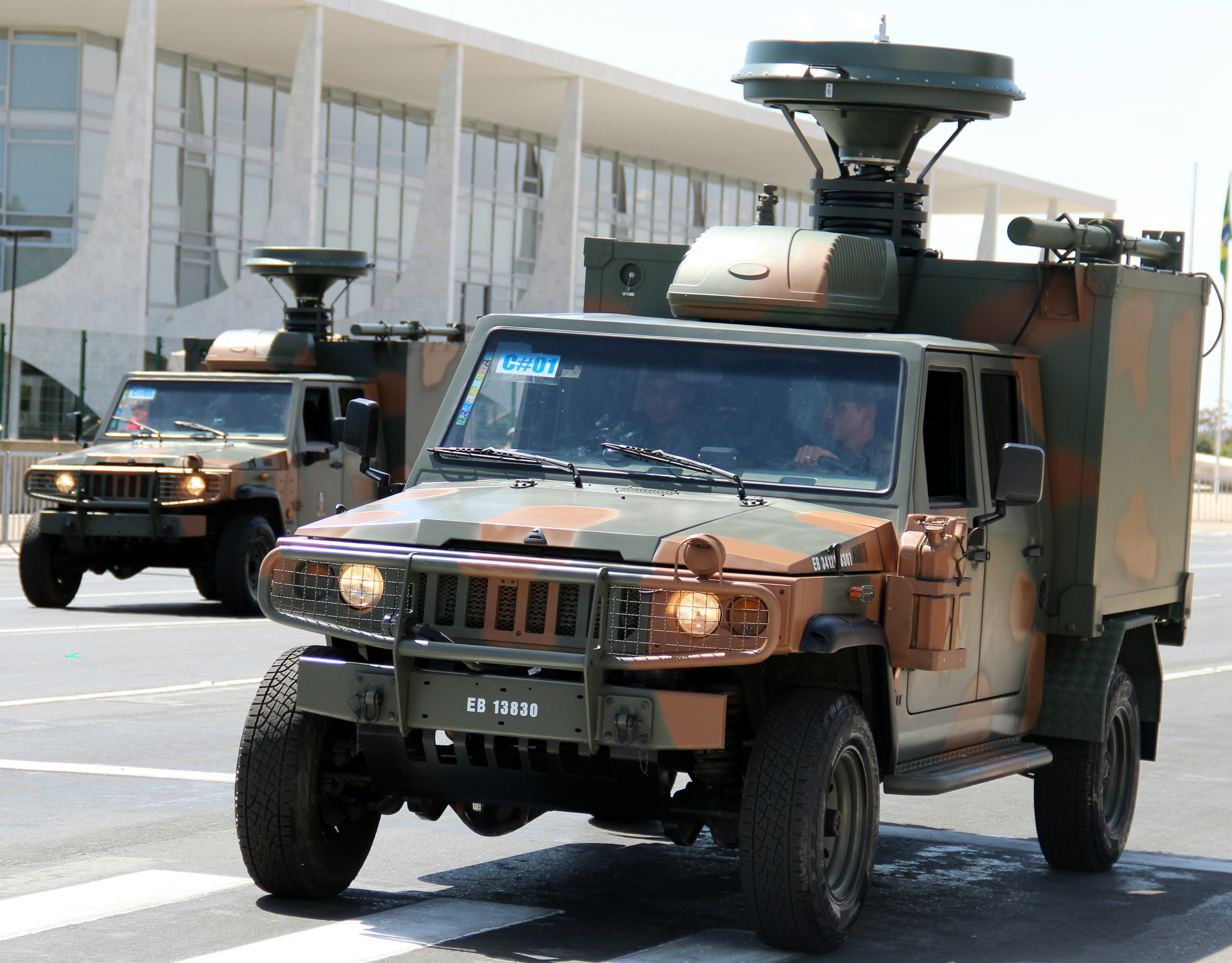
Agrale Marruá - Electronic Warfare.

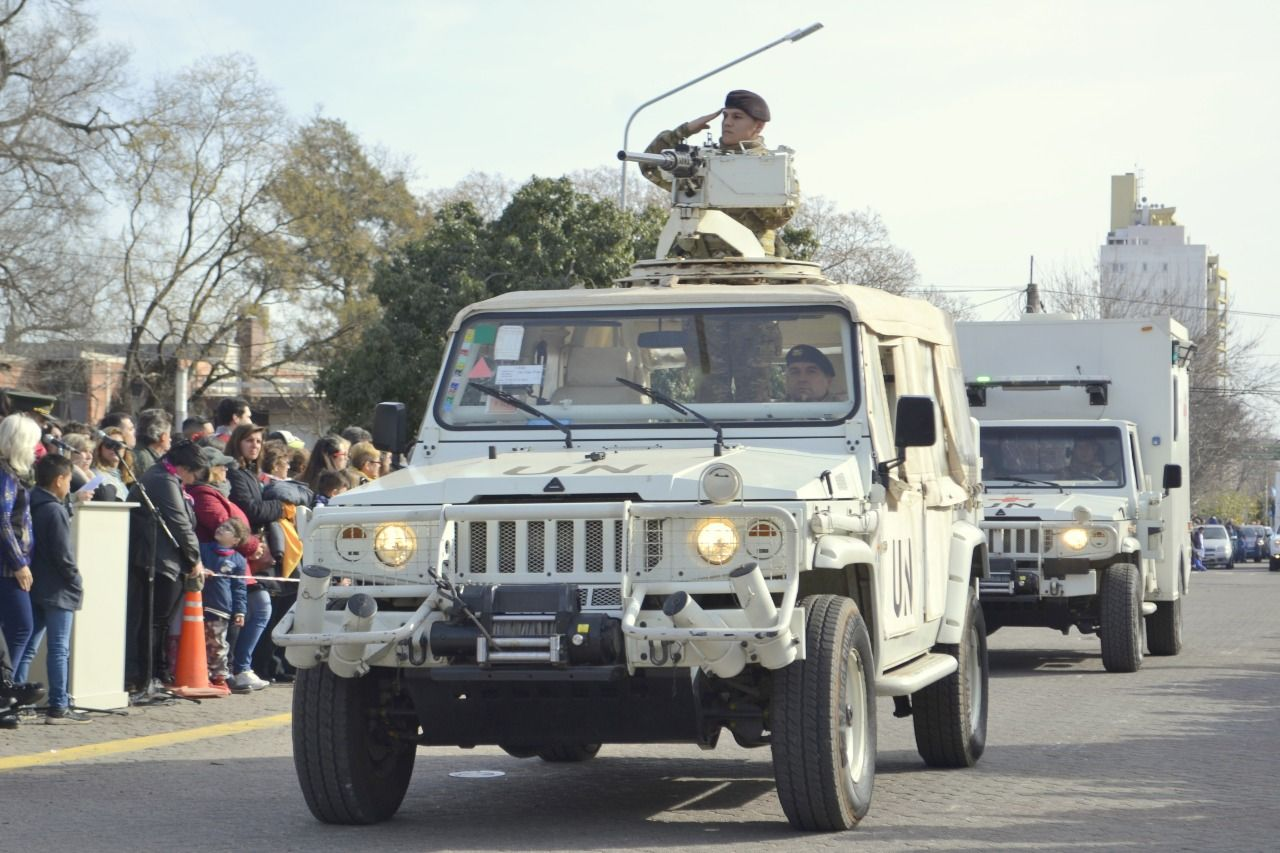
Argentine Agrale Marruá in UN colours

=== Civil versions ===
- Civil 4x4's feature Cummins ISF 2.8 turbodiesels meeting Euro V standards with enclosed cabs or Cummins F38 3.8l 175 hp turbodiesels coupled with 6 speed Alisson LCT 1000 XFE - Automatic or EATON ESO 6205 5 speed Manual transmissions meeting Euro VI standards.
  - Agrale Marruá AM200 G2 CD (Cabine Dupla) - Double Cab Pickup
  - Agrale Marruá AM200 G2 CS (Cabine Simples) - Single Cab Pickup
  - Agrale Marruá AM300 G2 CC (Chassi-Cabine)- Chassis cab
- Bortana EV - Safescape, an Australian mine safety company and Marrua importer, produces an electric version of the Marrua called the Bortana EV for use in underground mines. The Bortana EV replaces the ICE of the Marrua with a 160 kW electric motor which has 350Nm of torque. The Bortana EV has a payload of two tons.
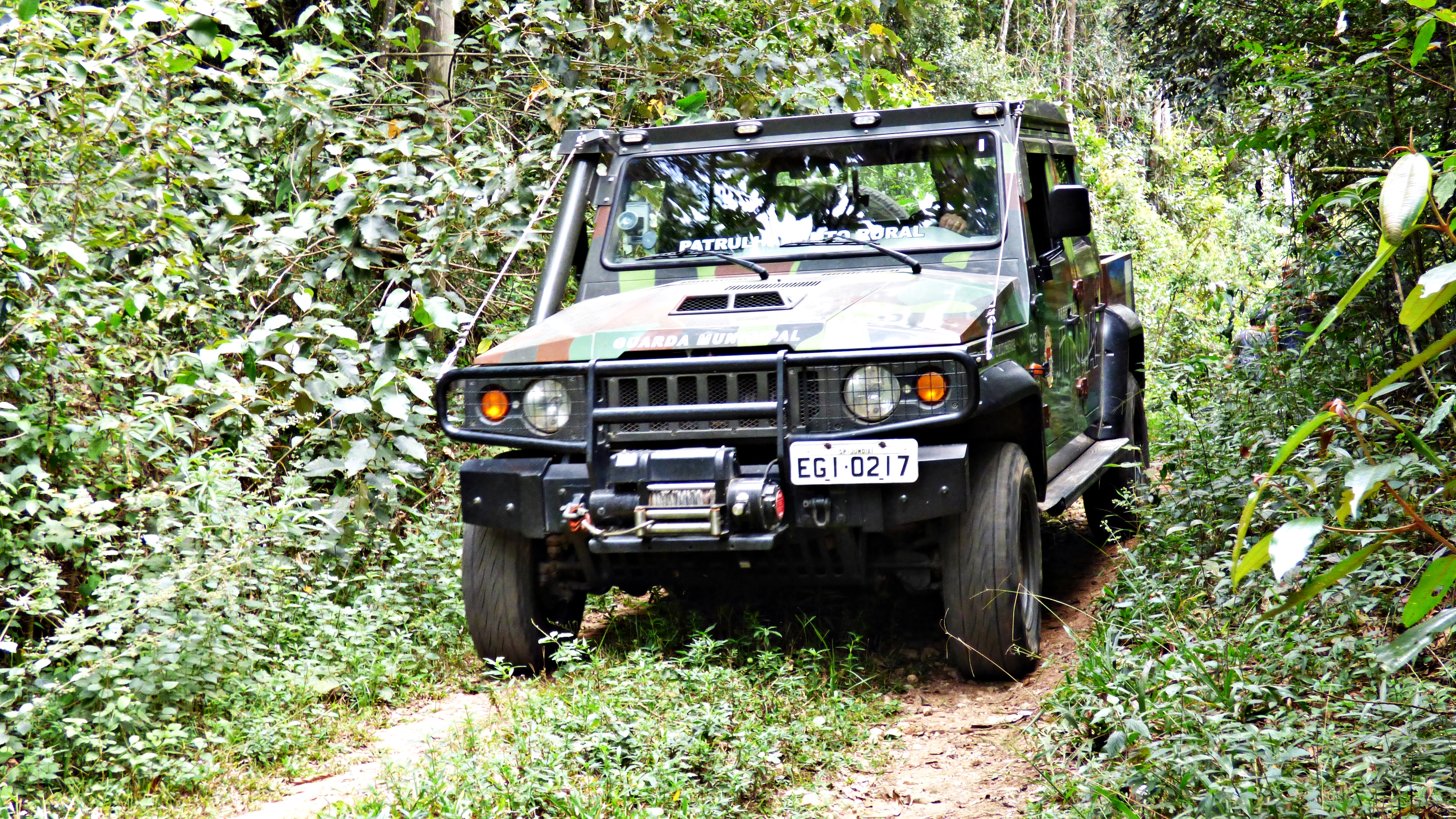
Municipal Guard AM 100CD

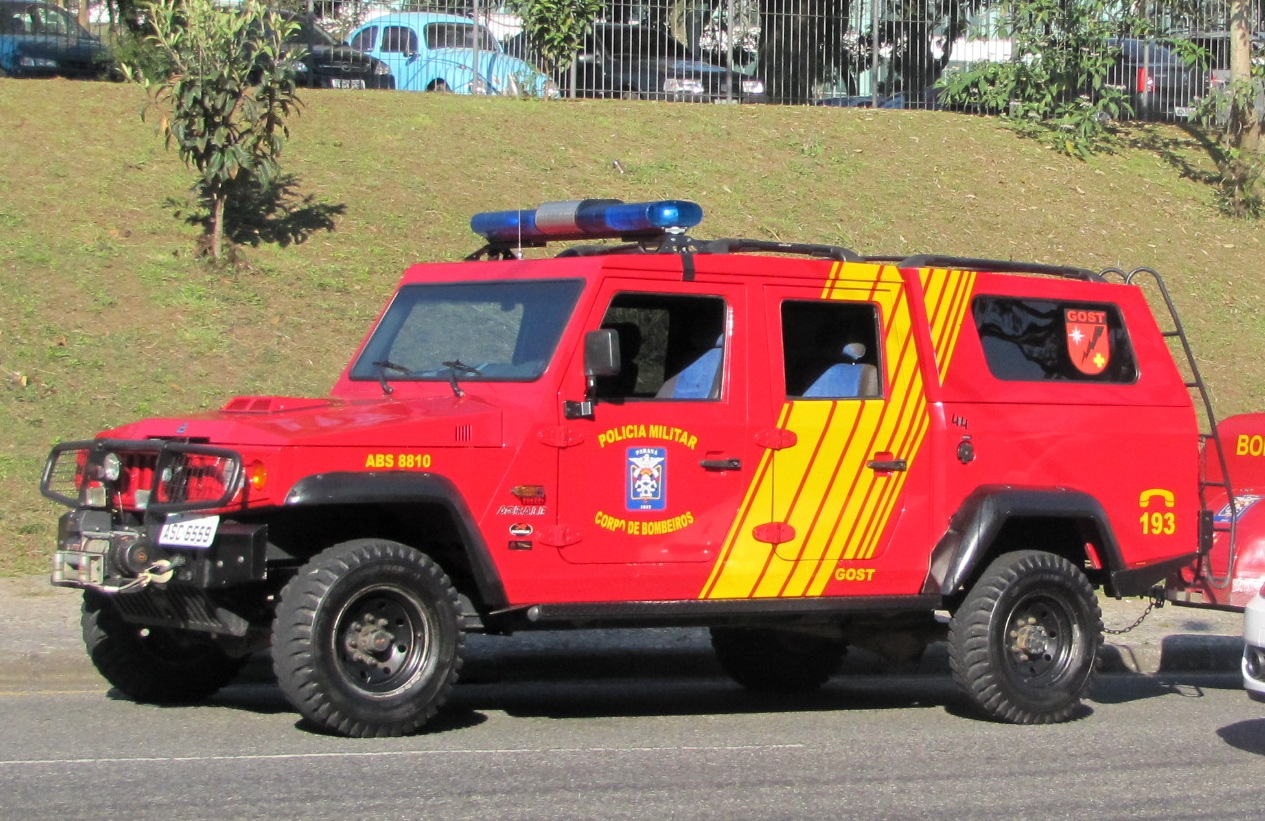
Agrale Marruá AM200 G2 CD fire vehicle

Agrale Marruá VTNE 3/4 BOPE

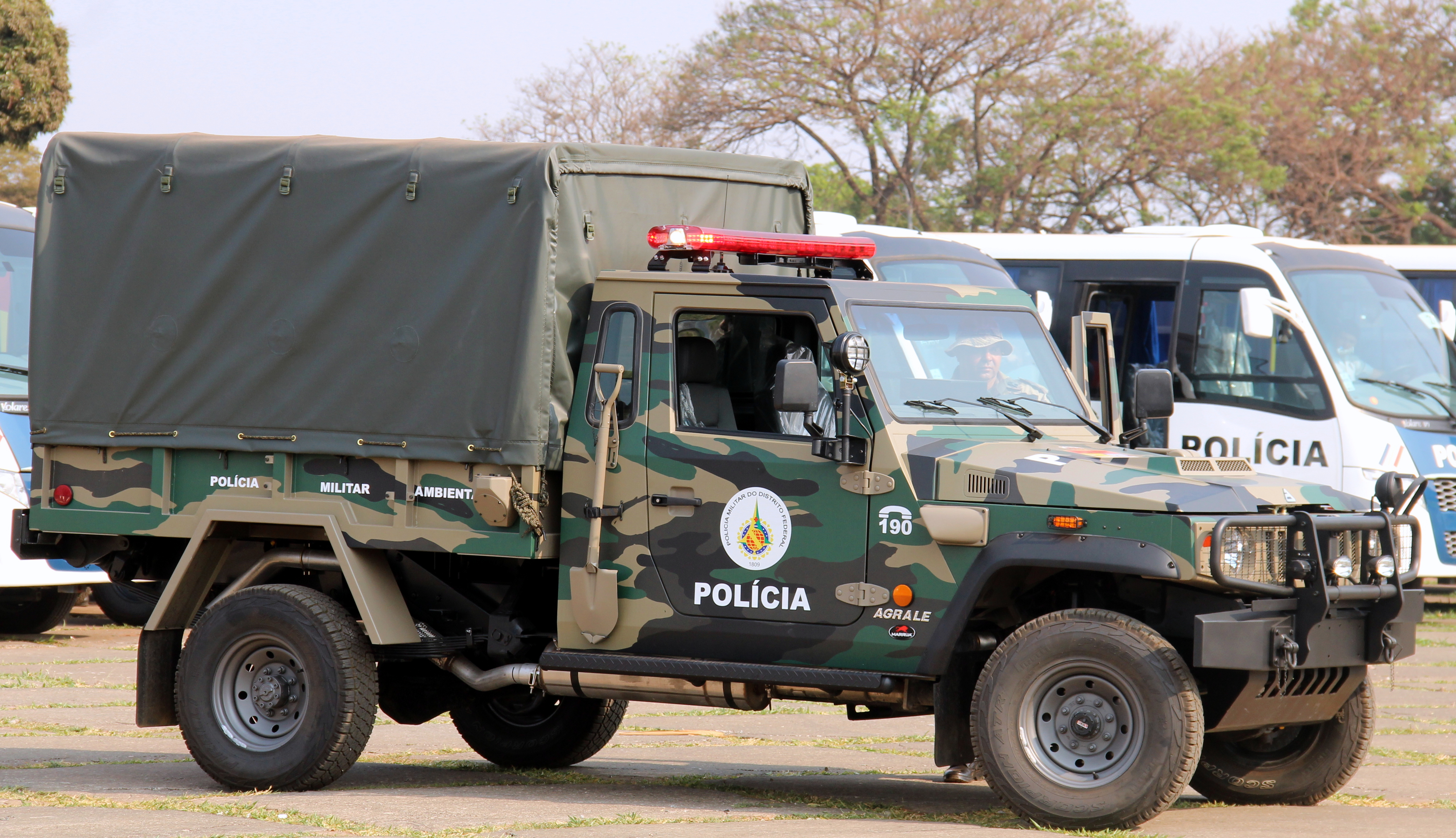
Agrale Marruá VTNE 3/4 Environmental Military Police

=== Former Versions ===
- Agrale Marruá AM50 Trabalhando - civil version of the VTNE
- Agrale Marruá AM100 Trabalhando - first pickup version based on VTNE platform
- Agrale Marruá AM150 - Agrale Marruá AM11/AM11 REC/VTNE/VTL REC based Double Cab Pickup/Chassis cab

== Operational history ==
The Marruá has entered service with both the Brazilian Army and the Brazilian Marine Corps, in addition to being acquired by the armies of Ecuador and Argentina, the latter using eighteen vehicles as part of the United Nations Peacekeeping Mission in Haiti starting in 2009.

== Operators ==
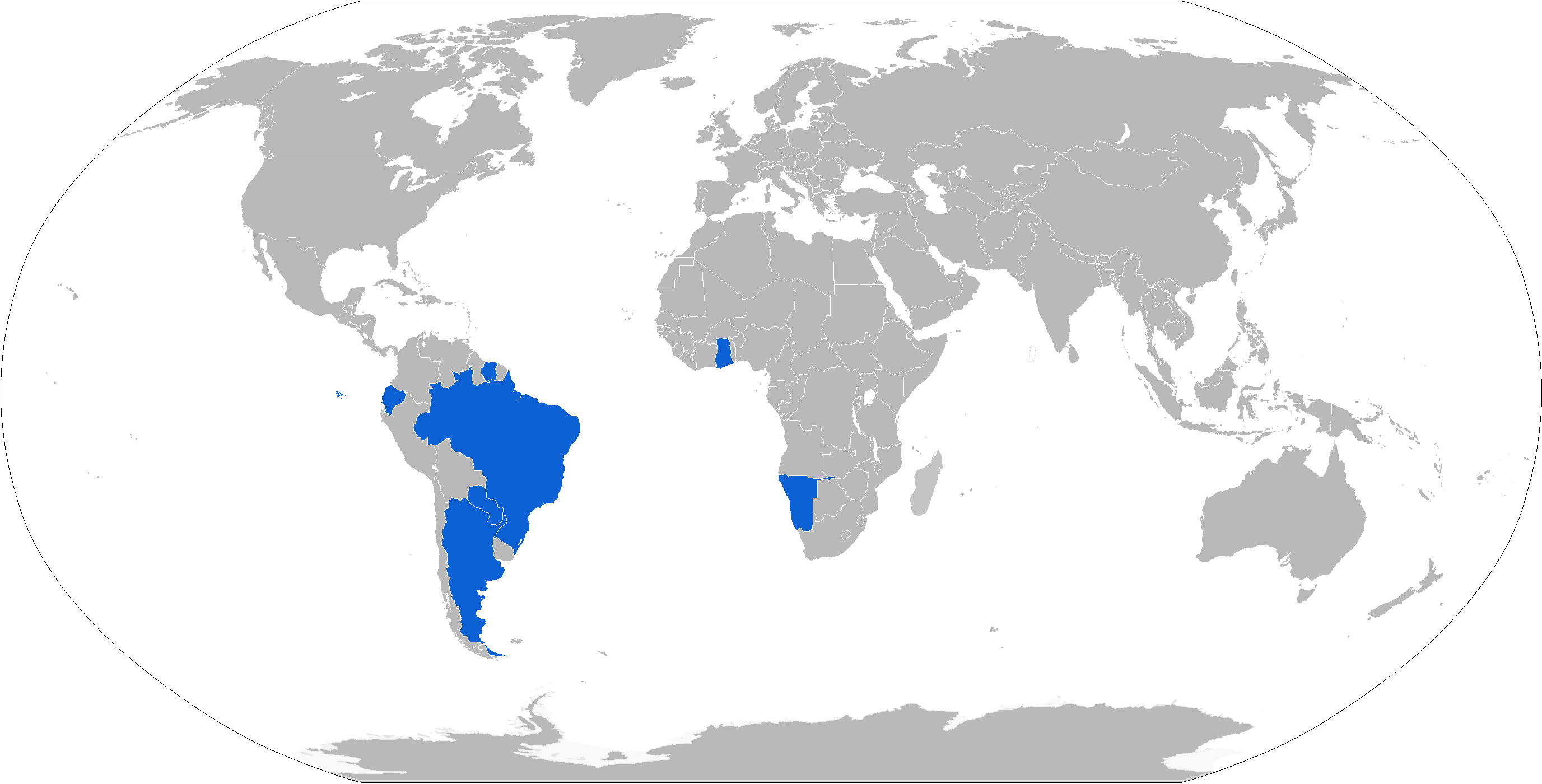
Map of Agrale Marrua operators in blue

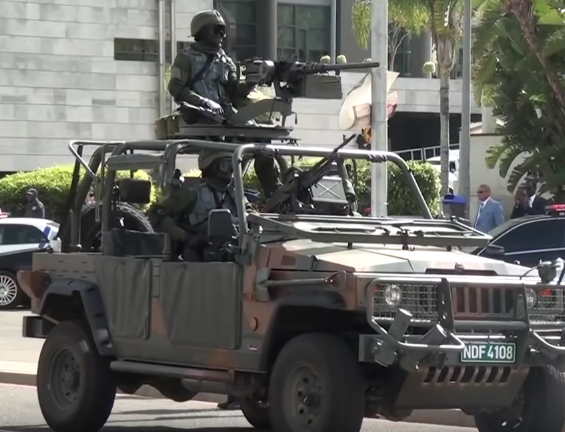
Agrale Marrua of the Namibian Special Forces

Argentina
Argentine Army
Argentine Air Force
Argentine Marines
Argentine National Gendarmerie
Brazil
Brazilian Army
Brazilian Navy
Brazilian Air Force
Brazilian Marine Corps
Military Police
Ecuador
Ecuadorian Army
Ghana
Ghana Armed Forces
Malaysia
Malaysian Army
Namibia
Namibian Defence Force
Namibian Army
Namibian Special Forces
Paraguay
Paraguayan Army
Peru
Peruvian Army
Suriname
Army of Suriname
United Arab Emirates
United Arab Emirates Armed Forces
Uganda
Army of Uganda
Uruguay
Uruguayan Army

== Specifications ==
from

=== Dimensions ===
- Length: 3.8 metres (12 ft)
- Overall Height: 1.95 metres (6.4 ft)
- Height with windshield folded: 1.40 metres (4.6 ft)
- Width: 1.92 metres (6.3 ft)
- Capacity: 4-6 soldiers

=== Weights ===
- Weight in running order: 1,960 kilograms (4,320 lb)
- Gross weight: 2,460 kilograms (5,420 lb)

=== Performance ===
- Maximum speed: 128 kilometres per hour (80 mph)
- Minimum sustainable speed: 4 kilometres per hour (2.5 mph)
- Maximum incline: 60%
- Maximum lateral incline: 30%
- Ford depth without snorkel: 0.60 metres (24 in)
- Ground clearance: 0.26 metres (10 in)
- Approach angle: 64°
- Departure angle: 52°
- Maximum payload: 500 kilograms (1,100 lb) + 500 kilograms (1,100 lb) trailer
- Fuel capacity: 100 litres (22 imp gal; 26 US gal)
- Range: 1,000 kilometres (620 mi) (on road)

=== Transmission ===
- Model: Eaton FS 2305, mechanical
- Gears: 5 forward gears and 1 reverse

=== Engine ===
- Brand / Model: MWM 4.07TCA SPRINT-EII turbodiesel, 2.8-liter four-cylinder inline, water cooled
- Power: 132 horsepower (98 kW) at 3,600 rpm
- Torque: 340 Nm at 1,800 rpm
