= Aeronáutica Militar =

The term Aeronáutica Militar may refer to:

- The original name of the air arm of the Spanish Army (1913-1931) and the Spanish Republican Army (1931-1936); merged with the Naval Aviation (Aeronáutica Naval) in 1936 to form the Spanish Republican Air Force, today's Spanish Air Force
- The name of the air arm of the Portuguese Army from 1924 to 1952, today's Portuguese Air Force
- The name of the military aeronautics division of the Uruguayan Army from 1935 to 1952, today's Uruguayan Air Force

== See also ==
- Military aviation
