= Military Institute of Advanced Studies =

Uruguayan military training institute for senior officers

- Instituto Militar de Estudios Superiores
- Former names: Escuela de Estado Mayor; Escuela Superior de Guerra
- Type: Staff college
- Established: March 27, 1928
- Principal: Colonel Martín Álvarez
- Location: 2425 Artigas Boulevard, Montevideo, Uruguay; 34.8829°S 56.1672°W
- Campus: Urban
- Website: www.imes.edu.uy

The Military Institute of Advanced Studies (Spanish: Instituto Militar de Estudios Superiores) is Uruguay’s command and staff college, responsible for the advanced professional education and training of experienced officers from the three branches of the Uruguayan Armed Forces. Established in 1928, the institute holds university-level recognition and offers undergraduate and postgraduate programs in the field of military sciences, with a focus on command, staff duties, and strategic studies.

== History ==
The Military Institute of Advanced Studies (Instituto Militar de Estudios Superiores, IMES) was founded on 27 March 1928 with the creation of the Staff Information Course and the Preparatory Staff Service Course, marking the beginning of higher-level professional military education within the Uruguayan Army. These early programmes were initially held at the Military School—then located in the present-day Army General Command building in the Jacinto Vera neighborhood of Montevideo—and at Mounted Artillery Regiment No. 1.

In 1932, the institution was formally designated as the Escuela de Estado Mayor (Spanish for 'Staff College'), and its academic activities commenced in March 1933 at the former Military School of Application—the present-day Military Institute of Arms and Specialties (IMAE). In April 1934, it was renamed the Escuela Superior de Guerra (Spanish for 'Higher War School'), subsequently relocating to a facility in the La Blanqueada neighborhood, later incorporated into the Central Hospital of the Armed Forces complex. The current name, Military Institute of Advanced Studies, was adopted in 1941. In the following decades, the institute operated from several locations, including the former grounds of the Liceo Militar General Artigas and, from 1976, a building in central Montevideo.

On 23 December 1999, a purpose-built campus adjacent to the Army General Command was inaugurated as the institute’s permanent headquarters, with academic activities commencing there in May 2000. In 2001, IMES was granted university-level status and authorised to award the degree of Licentiate in Military Sciences. In 2022, the institute was accredited as a postgraduate centre specialising in Military History, enabling it to award the title of Specialist in Military History and to offer the Master’s degree in Land Military Strategy.

== Schools ==
The institute consists of five schools:

- School of Advanced Studies: Provides professional development and advanced training courses for senior officers, including programmes in human rights with a focus on international law, as well as a postgraduate specialisation in Military History.
- Command and Staff School: Delivers staff courses for commissioned officers and offers a master's degree in land military strategy.
- Army Strategy School: Offers courses in operational and military strategy.
- Army Language School: Provides instruction in English, French, and Portuguese at basic, intermediate, and advanced levels, as well as specialised courses for officers assigned to peacekeeping missions.
- Military Engineering School: Provides specialised education and training in military engineering.
