= Agrale =

Brazilian vehicle manufacturer

Agrale S.A.
- Formerly: Agrisa
- Type: Private company
- Industry: Agricultural machinery, Automotive
- Founded: 1962; 64 years ago
- Headquarters: Caxias do Sul, Brazil
- Area served: Brazil
- Key people: Hugo Zattera (CEO)
- Products: Tractors; Trucks; Pickup; Marrua; Bus Chassis; Engines
- Revenue: ▲US$1.0 billion (2010)
- Net income: ▲US$31.4 million (2010)
- Owner: Francisco Stedile Group
- Number of employees: 12,300
- Website: agrale.com.br

Agrale, previously called Agrisa, is a Brazilian vehicle manufacturing company. Agrale manufactures tractors, commercial vehicles, military vehicles, bus chassis and engines. The tractors it manufactures include both self-developed models, and ones based on Zetor designs.

The company was established in 1962 and is based in Caxias do Sul in the state of Rio Grande do Sul. The company's current model line-up consists of pick-up trucks and the Marruá SUV. Agrale no longer produces motorcycles or scooters.

Agrale subsidiary "Lintec" produces generators, diesel water pumps, engines, rotary cutters (weed wackers) and materials handling equipment.

== History ==
The company was originally called AGRISA (Indústria Gaúcha de Implementos Agrícolas SA), and built AGRISA-Bungartz tractors under license of the German-based Bungartz company. Later alliances included Deutz-Fahr, when they built some tractors and trucks under the Agrale-Deutz name, and later with Zetor. Agrale is now a part of the Francisco Stedile Group, which includes the Lavrale, Fazenda Três Rios, Germani Foods and Yanmar-Agritech Tractors companies.

Agrale produced about 5000 buses in 2004

Since 2008, the brand FNM, Fábrica Nacional de Motores, was bought from a group in Rio de Janeiro, from INPI, and resurged as an Electric Delivery Truck called Fábrica Nacional de Modalidades with Joint-Venture Production at Agrale Caxias Do Sul Factory. The first Prototype was finished in December 2020.

== Products ==
The most traditional segment of activity Agrale is the manufacture of small tractors with power from 14.7 hp, intended mainly for use in the vineyards of the wine region of Rio Grande do Sul, near the company headquarters. Today the tractors are offered with power ratings up to 140 hp and offers up to 9.2 tonne trucks, diesel stationary and bus chassis, a segment in which it is acting with more emphasis.

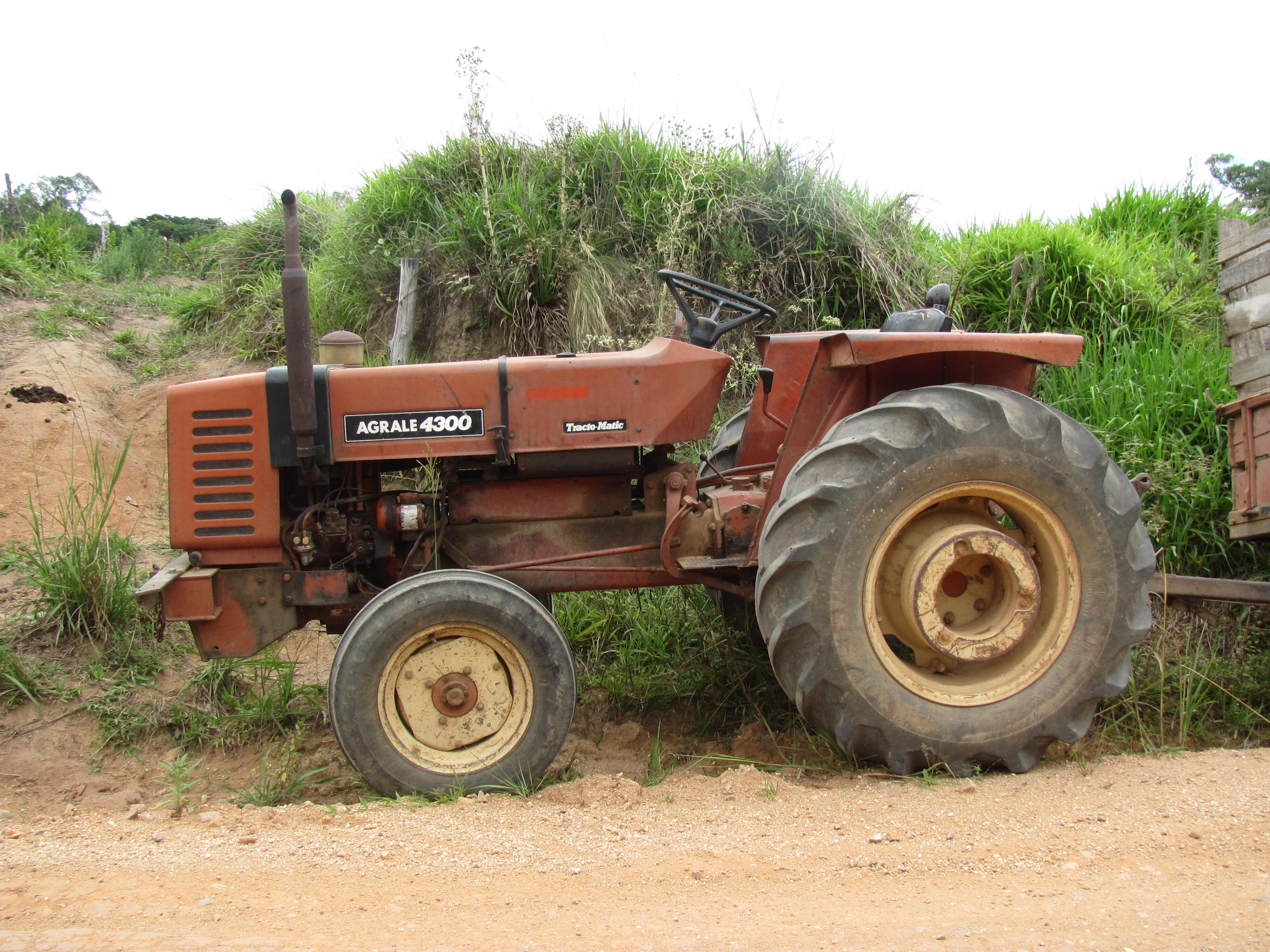
Agrale tractor 4300

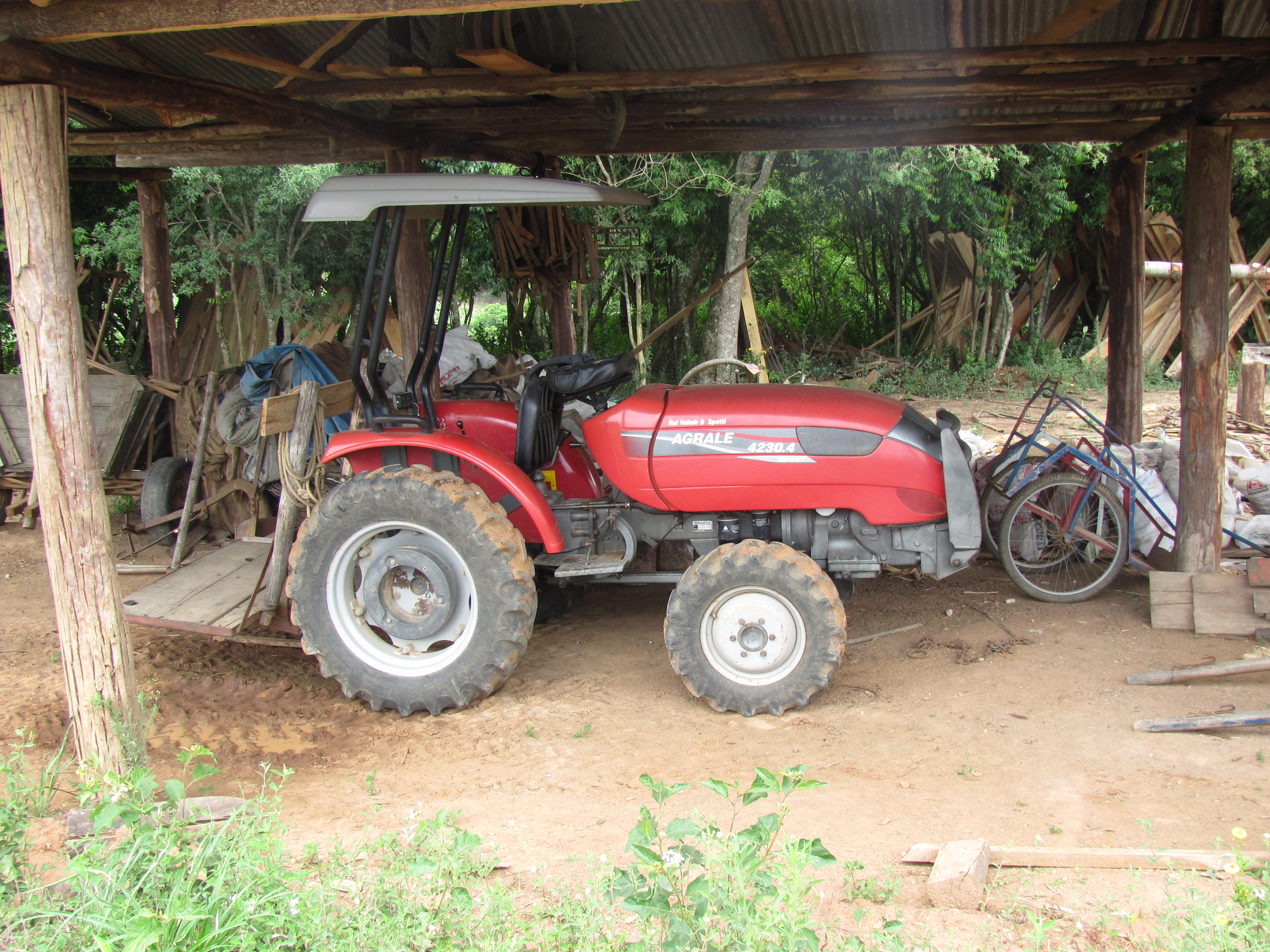
Agrale 4230.4

=== Tractors ===
- 400 Series - The first tractors were produced by Agrale models 415, 416 and 420. The 420 model 4100 gave rise to the following series, being produced until the present day with several changes, mostly cosmetic.
- 4000 Series - The 4000 series was composed by the models 4100, 4200 and 4300. Currently, the 4100 remains in production with models 4118, 4230, 4240, featuring versions 4X2, 4X4 and industrial, the latter with an optional natural gas engine. Also part of the line, tractors load model derived from 4230.4 (4x4 version of the model 4230).
- 5000 Series
- 6000 Series - It consists of three models with 4x4 traction:
  - BX6110 - equipped with a turbocharged MWM TD229 EC4, 77 kW (105 hp) 4-cylinder engine
  - BX6150 - equipped with, turbocharged MWM TD229 EC6, 103 kW (140 hp) 6-cylinder engine.
  - BX6180 - equipped with a turbocharged MWM TD229 EC6, 126 kW (168 hp) 6-cylinder engine.
- Series BX - produced from the 1990s and led to the current 5000 and 6000.

=== Trucks ===
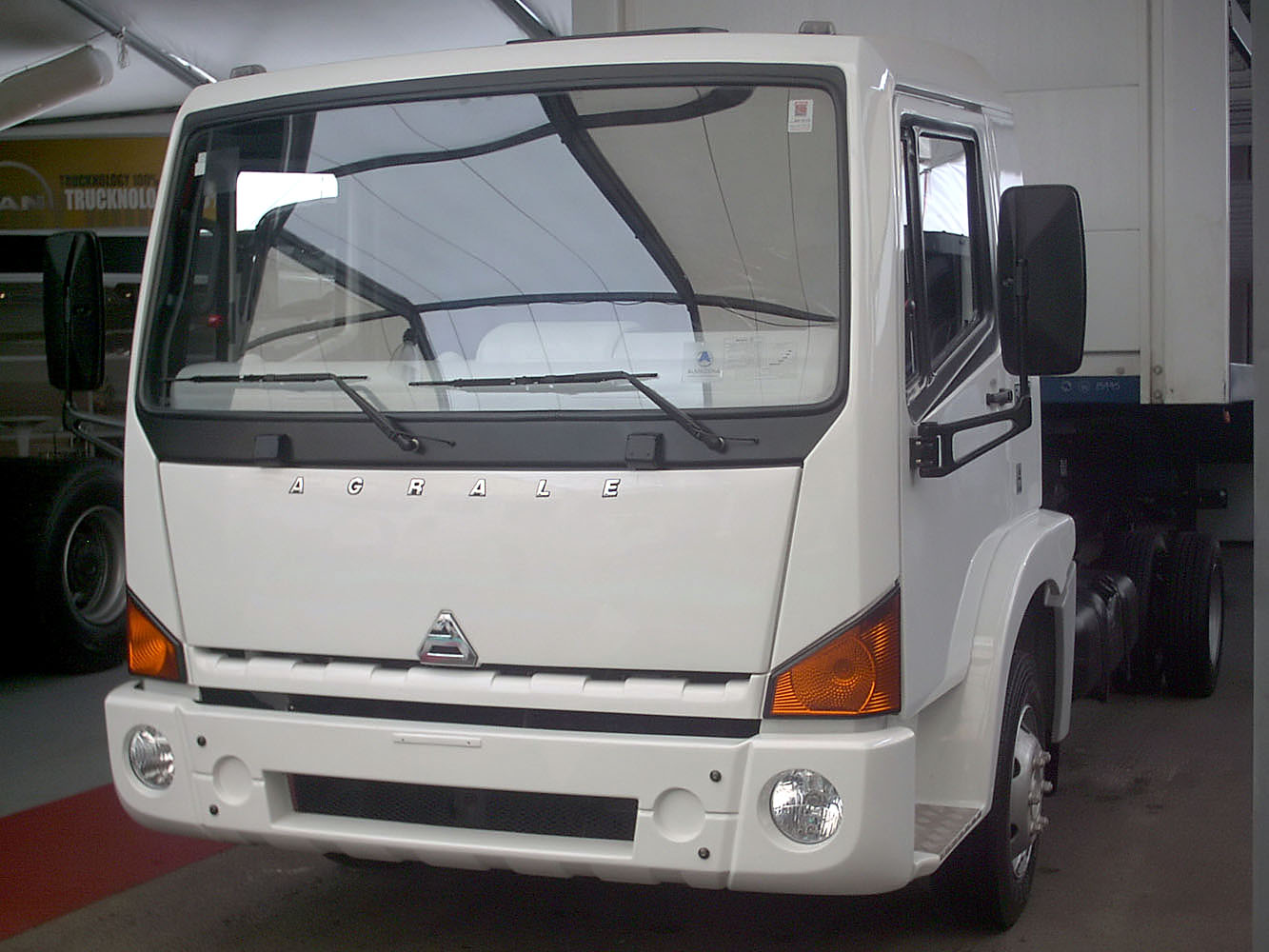
2008 Agrale 8500 E-tronic.

The first trucks were models TX-1100 TX-1200 and TX-1600, equipped with MWM 229.3 of three cylinders, or Agrale M-790 twin-cylinder. The trucks were also manufactured in alcohol and gasoline versions, using the four-cylinder engine GM Opal. Agrale currently produces trucks ranging from 6000 to its PBT 20000 kg, most recently with the CA13000 6x2. Agrale uses fiberglass cabs, ensuring strength, durability, thermal and acoustic insulation, many times that of steel cabs.

Current models are:

- Euro III standard (all 4x2)
  - Agrale 6000
  - Agrale 8500
  - Agrale 8500 CD
  - Agrale 8500 CE (4.08)
  - Agrale 8500 CE (4.12)
  - Agrale 9200 CE
  - Agrale 13000
  - Agrale 13000 6X2
- A Line
  - Agrale A8700
  - Agrale A10000
- Line LX
  - Agrale 8700 LX
  - Agrale 10000 LX
  - Agrale 14000 LX
- Line S
  - Agrale 8700 S
  - Agrale 10000 S
  - Agrale 8700 TR
  - Agrale 14000 S
  - Agrale 14000 S 6x2
- FNM 832 E & FNM 833 E

=== Utilities ===
Agrale produces the Marruá 4x4 Utility vehicle in both a Jeeplike versions, a pickup truck, and as a chassis cab. Current models include:

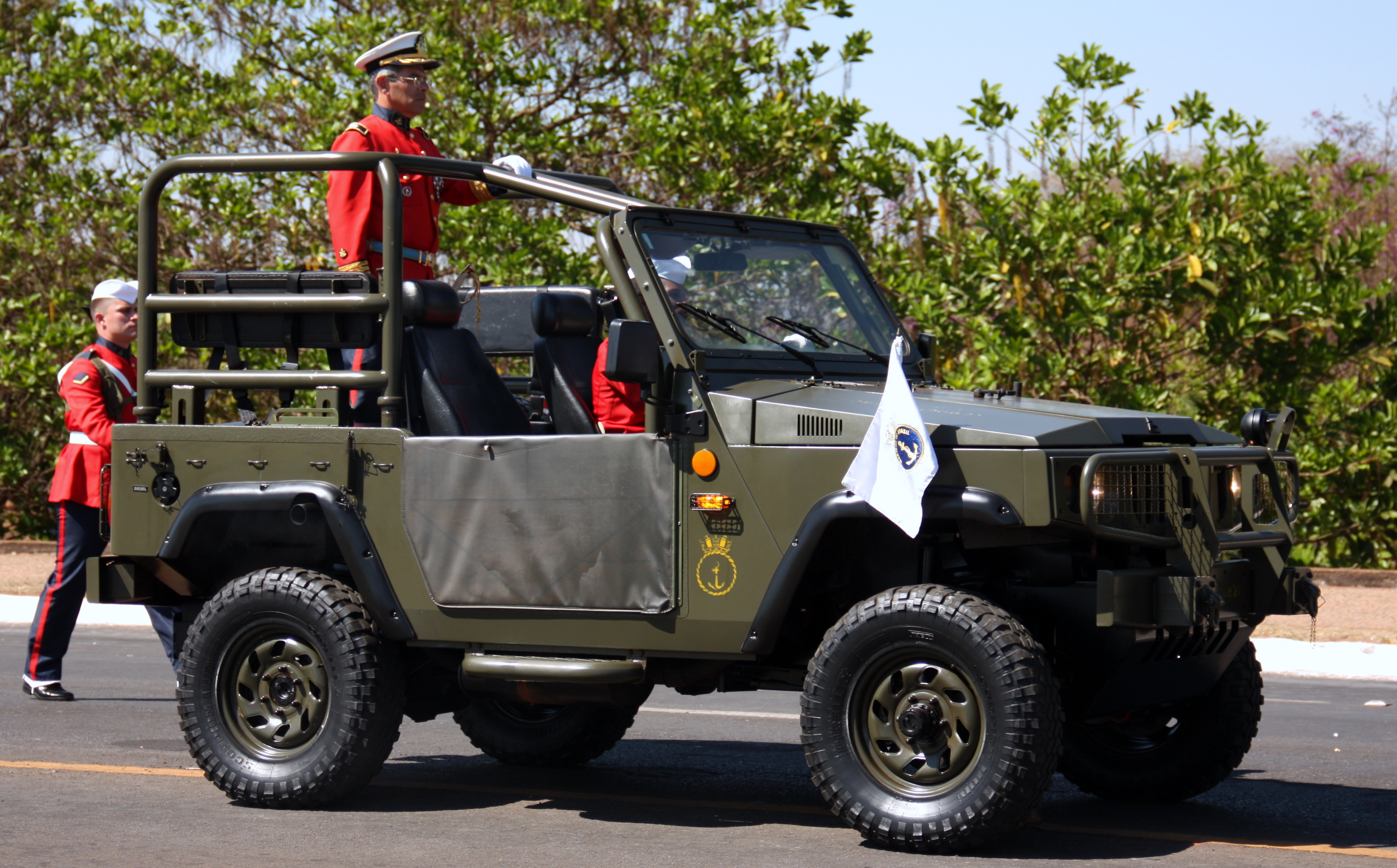
AM2 MB-NET is a specialised version for the Brazilian Marine Corps, with rust-resistant paint, high-flotation tires, and seating for six.

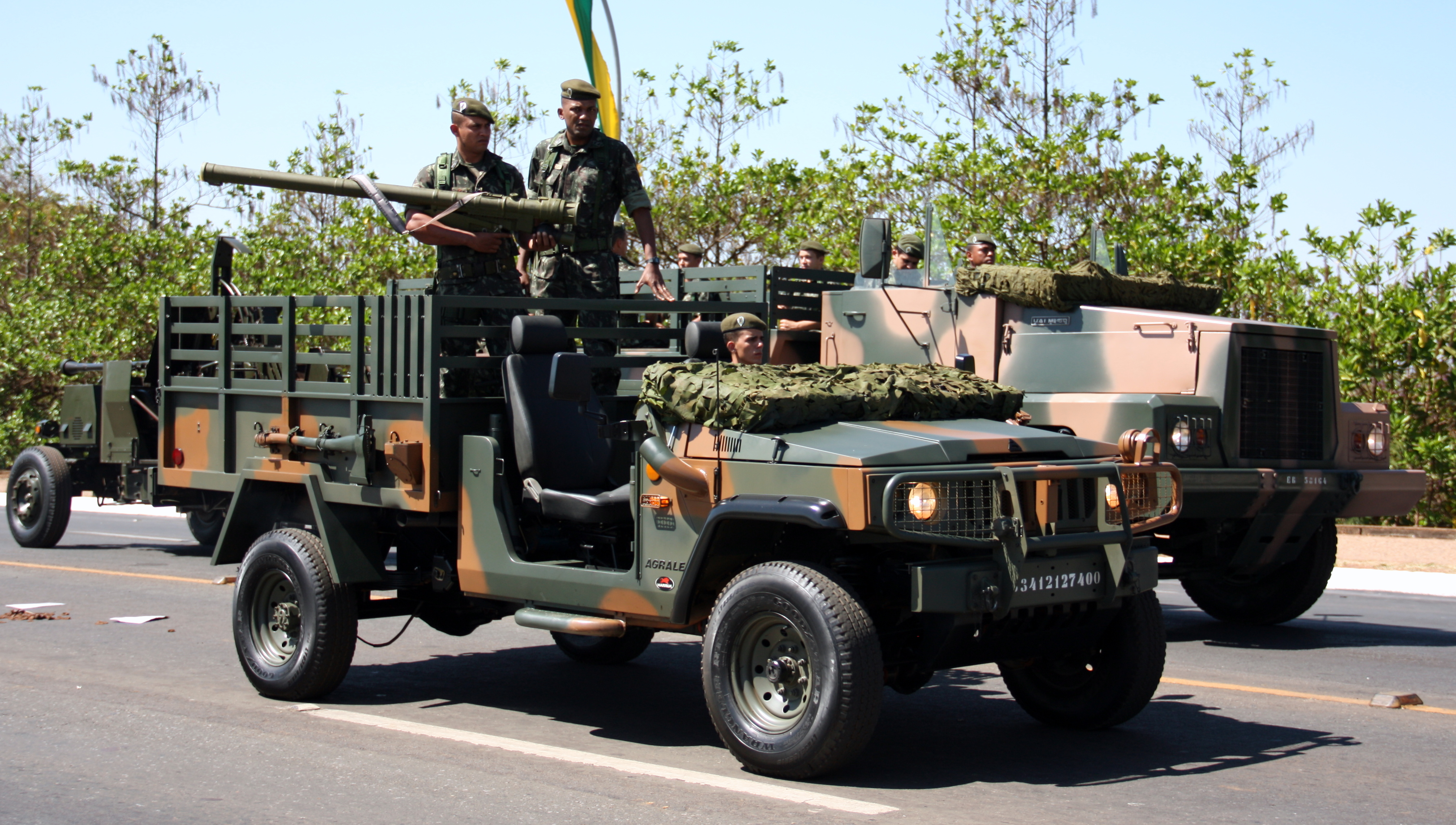
Agrale Marruá AM21 - VTNE ¾ Ton.

==== Military versions ====
- Military Viatura de Transporte Não Especializada (Non-Specialised Transport, VTNE) 4x4's meeting Euro III standards
  - Agrale Marruá AM2 VTNE ½ Ton (four person two door jeep-like vehicle)
  - Agrale Marruá AM11/AM11 REC/VTNE/VTL REC (four person four door jeep-like vehicle)
  - Agrale Marruá AM21 - VTNE ¾ Ton (eight person two door pick-up vehicle)
  - Agrale Marruá AM23 - VTNE ¾ Ton
  - Agrale Marruá AM23 CC/CDCC - VTNE ¾ Ton (Chassis cab-container carrier)
  - Agrale Marruá AM31 - VTNE 1½ Ton (with dual wheel wheels)
  - Agrale Marruá AM41 - VTNE 2½ Ton

==== Civil versions ====
- Civil 4x4's meeting Euro V standards
  - Agrale Marruá AM200 G2 - Double Cab Pickup
  - Agrale Marruá AM200 G2 - Single Cab Pickup
  - Agrale Marruá AM300 G2 - Chassis cab

==== Former civil models ====
- Agrale Marruá AM50 - civil version of the Agrale Marruá AM2 VTNE
- Agrale Marruá AM100 - Agrale Marruá AM11/AM11 REC/VTNE/VTL REC based Single Cab Pickup
- Agrale Marruá AM150 - Agrale Marruá AM11/AM11 REC/VTNE/VTL REC based Double Cab Pickup/Chassis cab

=== Bus chassis ===
Agrale also has a range of bus chassis.

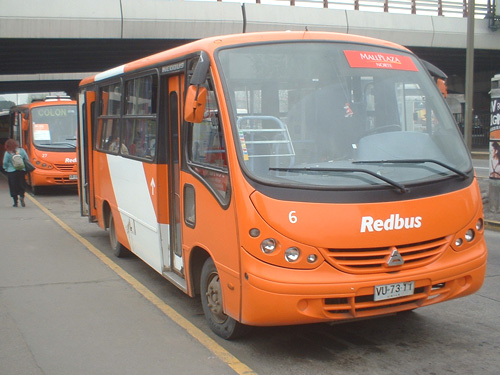
Agrale Onibus in Chile

==== Chassis Micro Bus ====
- Agrale 1800
- MA 5.5 T
- MA 7.5
- MA 7.9
- MA 8.5
- MA 8.5 T
- MA 8.5 super
- MA 8.7 Euro V
- MA 9.2
- MA 9.2 Euro V
- MA 9.2 Green E-tronic
- MA 10.0
- MA 10.0 Euro V

==== Chassis for buses and midi ====
- MA 12.0
- MA 12.0 Euro V
- MA 15.0
- MA 15.0 Euro V
- MA 17.0 Euro V
- MT LE 12.0
- MT 12.0 Euro V LE
- MT 12.0 SB
- MT 15.0 Buggy
- MT LE 15.0
- MT 15.0 Euro V LE
- MT 15.0 SB

=== Engines ===
Through its subsidiary Lintec, also in Caxias do Sul, Agrale manufactures engines and power equipment (water pumps, lawn mowers and generators), with wide range of power. Lintec also sells Ruggerini and Lombardini engines alongside its own Agrale brand (790 m, m795w, etc.), water or air cooled, and Lintec (LD 1500, LD 2500, etc.) water cooled.

=== Assembler ===
Agrale also assembled International trucks, a brand acquired by NC2 Group brand. Agrale currently assembles heavy and light Internationals, a partnership that began in 1998 trucks and ended in 2013 with 43,000 units produced, which was mounted the first truck International 4700 brand.

== Former Products ==
=== Tractors ===
- Agrale BX 6180
- Agrale BX 6150
- Agrale BX 6110
- Agrale 7215
- Agrale 575.4
- Agrale 575.4 Compact
- Agrale 5105.4
- Agrale 5105

=== Trucks ===
- Agrale 6000
- Agrale 8500
- Agrale 9200
- Agrale 13000
- Agrale A8700
- Agrale A10000

=== Buses ===
- Agrale 8.5
- Agrale MA 12.0
- Agrale MA 15.0
- Agrale MT 12.0 SB
- Agrale MT 15.0 LE
- Agrale MT 17.0 LE

=== Motorcycles ===
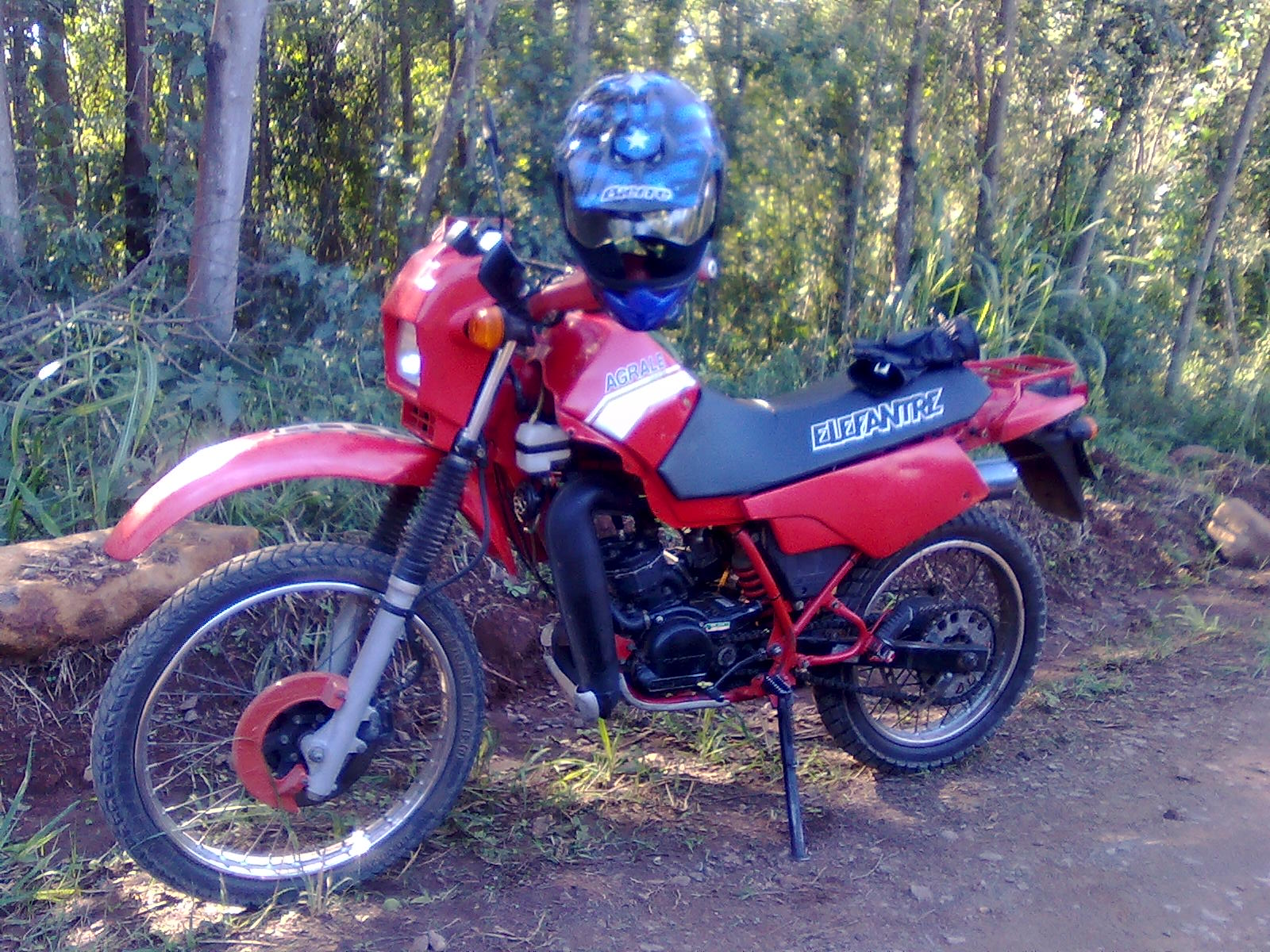
Agrale Elefantré 30.0.

Agrale manufactured over 400,000 motorcycles from 1984 and 1997. The models were: Agrale SXT, SST, Elefant, Dakar, Explorer, and Elefantre. Agrale motorcycles were based on Cagiva models.

== Agrale in Argentina ==
In 2007 in Argentina, Agrale was declared an automotive terminal by the Argentine government and at the same time acquired a 200,000 square feet (19,000 m^{2}) manufacturing plant in Mercedes, Buenos Aires Province. The total investment in the Mercedes plant reached $11,500,000 (equivalent to $17,856,283 in 2025), allocated to equipment and conditioning of the plant.

Manufacturing in Argentina commenced in October 2008 with the production of a chassis for a rear-engined 12-ton bus. Production diversified throughout 2009 with the production of a front-engined bus chassis, a 17-ton bus chassis, a minibus and an Argale 7500 light truck. In addition to this line, Agrale Argentina also developed a prototype bus for both urban and medium-distance transport. In May 2009, the Mercedes plant obtained ISO Quality Certification. By mid-2009 the company had invested more than $12,000,000 into Argentina, employing 56 people in both production and administration.

By the end of 2015, Agrale Argentina achieved a local production record of 1,300 vehicles at its Mercedes plant, also achieving a record turnover of vehicle sales in the country.

== See also ==
- List of trucks
