= Liceo Militar General Artigas =

Coordinates: 34.8552°S 56.2106°W

General Artigas Military Lyceum
- Liceo Militar General Artigas

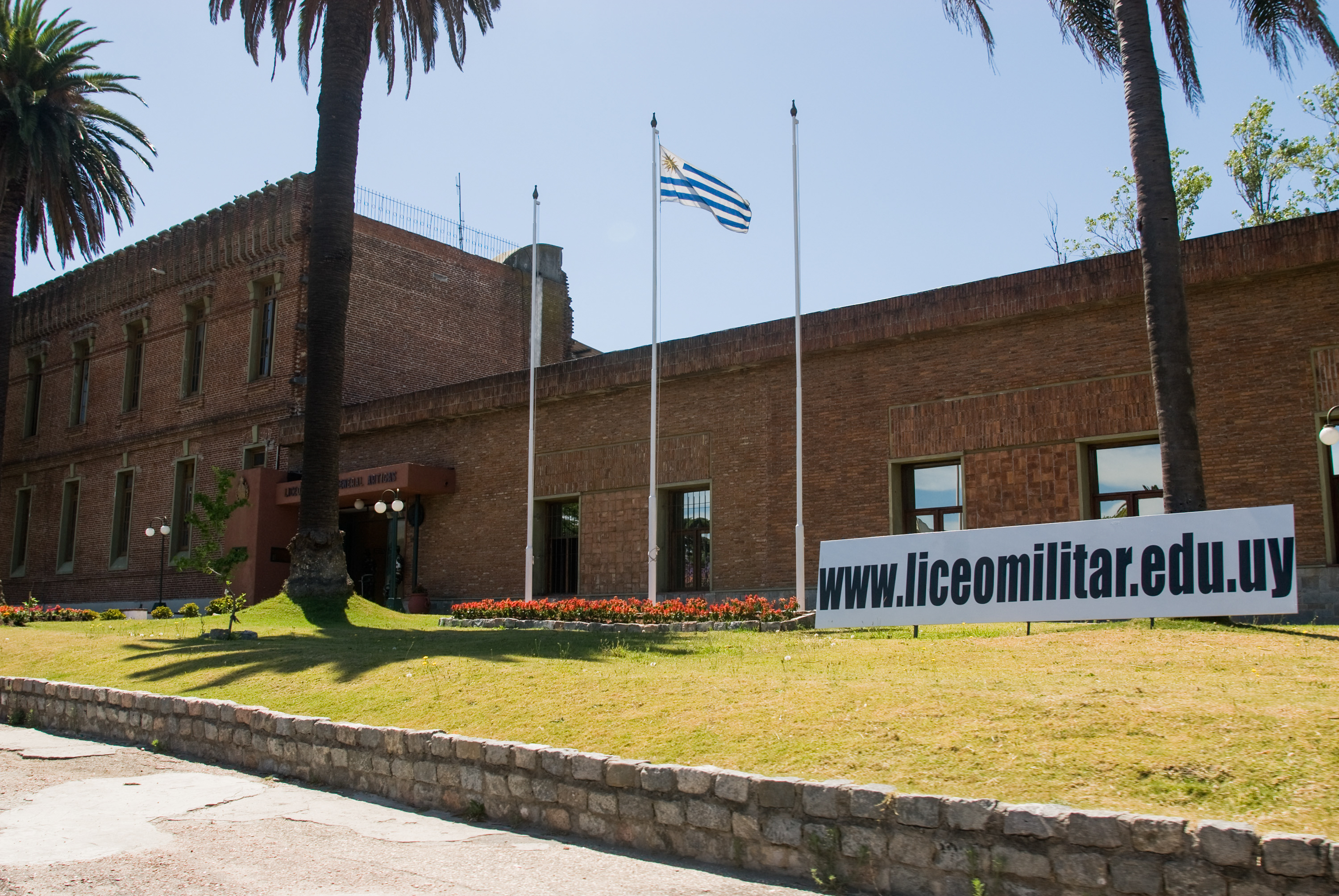
- Liceo Militar in 2008

Location
- 290 Camino Castro; Prado, Montevideo; Uruguay

Information
- Former names: Liceo Militar y Naval (1950–1966)
- Type: Public secondary
- Motto: Spanish: Un lugar para crecer con honor y disciplina ('A place for growth with honor and discipline')
- Established: 1947
- Headmaster: Col. Daniel Ubal Silveira
- Gender: Coeducational
- Enrollment: 550 (2025)
- Colours: Blue, red and white
- Nickname: LMGA
- Website: Liceo Militar

Liceo Militar General Artigas is a coeducational public secondary school in Montevideo, Uruguay. Located in the Prado neighborhood, it provides the final three years of secondary education (grades 10 to 12), combining the national academic curriculum with pre-military training. The institution operates both as a day and as a boarding school, preparing its graduates for further civilian studies as well as for potential careers within the armed forces.

== History ==
The Liceo Militar General Artigas was founded on 13 March 1947 by Executive Decree No. 9,010, during the presidency of Tomás Berreta. It was originally established as an all-boys public day school, with the purpose of providing free secondary education in the third and fourth years of secondary school (grades 9 and 10), following the national curriculum, while incorporating premilitary instruction as mandated by Law No. 9,943 of 1940. This legislation, enacted in the context of World War II, established compulsory premilitary training for young people between the ages of ten and eighteen.

Following its creation, secondary-level courses previously offered within the country’s various military academies were discontinued. As a result, the institution temporarily adopted the name Liceo Militar y Naval. On 24 August 1947, the school received its first War Flag in a ceremony attended by President Luis Batlle Berres and First Lady Matilde Ibáñez Tálice, who formally presented the flag and was appointed Madrina del Liceo Militar (Spanish for 'Godmother of the Military Lyceum') an honorary role she held until her death in 2002.

In 1949, a semi-boarding system was introduced, allowing enrollment to increase to 220 students. The following year, in commemoration of the centenary of the death of José Gervasio Artigas, the institution was renamed Liceo Militar y Naval General Artigas, a designation it retained until 1966, when it adopted its current name, Liceo Militar General Artigas.

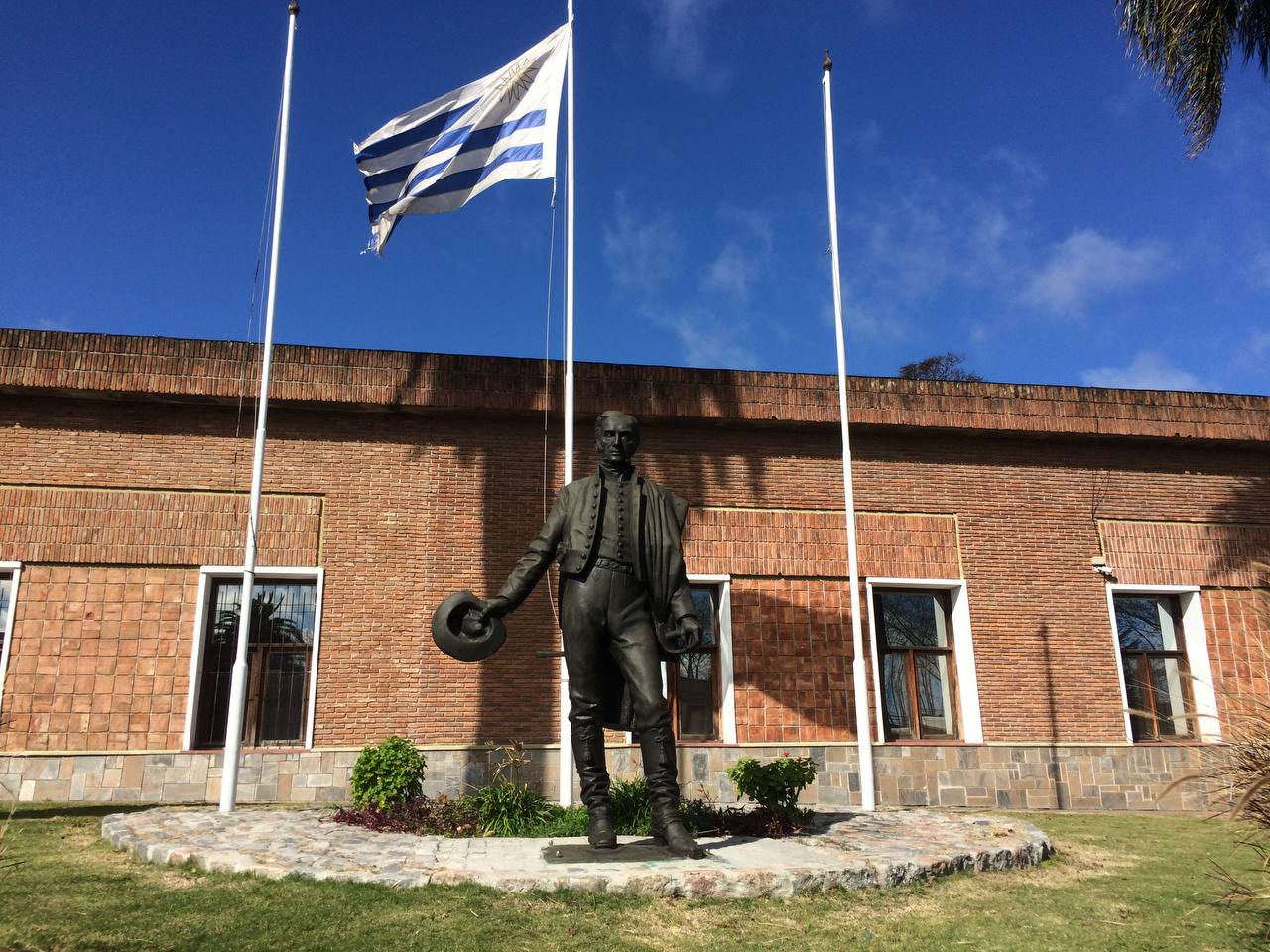
Monument to José Gervasio Artigas at the school’s main entrance.

In 1966, the school was granted use of the Prado athletics track. From 1973 to 1985, additional military lyceums operated in the cities of Durazno, Paso de los Toros, Minas, Treinta y Tres and Colonia del Sacramento. During this period, boarding facilities at the Montevideo campus were suspended. Following the closure of all these institutions in 1985, boarding was reinstated at the main Montevideo site. In 1984, the curriculum was expanded to include the fifth year of secondary education (grade 11), followed in 1985 by the addition of the sixth and final year (grade 12). That year also marked the last time the institution offered the basic cycle of secondary education.

In 1996, the Liceo Militar admitted its first cohort of female students, and became fully coeducational in 2004 with the introduction of boarding facilities for women.

On 2 March 2018, the Liceo Militar Northern Annex was inaugurated as a second campus in Tacuarembó, providing instruction at the same educational levels as the main campus.

== Academic ==
=== Admission ===
The Liceo Militar has its own entrance examination, and admission is limited to a fixed number of available places. Applicants must be Uruguayan nationals; foreign applicants may be admitted only upon formal request to the institution’s authorities, stating the exceptional circumstances that would justify such an application. The admission process includes medical and psychological evaluations, a physical aptitude test, and examinations in literature and mathematics. The final admission score is calculated as an average of all assessments.

=== Results ===
The Liceo Militar is characterized by high academic standards. It ranks among the Uruguayan secondary schools with the lowest rates of grade retention and student dropout, at under 1%. Between 2001 and 2015, around 40% of its graduates did not continue into a military career, instead pursuing civilian studies.

== Activities ==
=== Sport ===
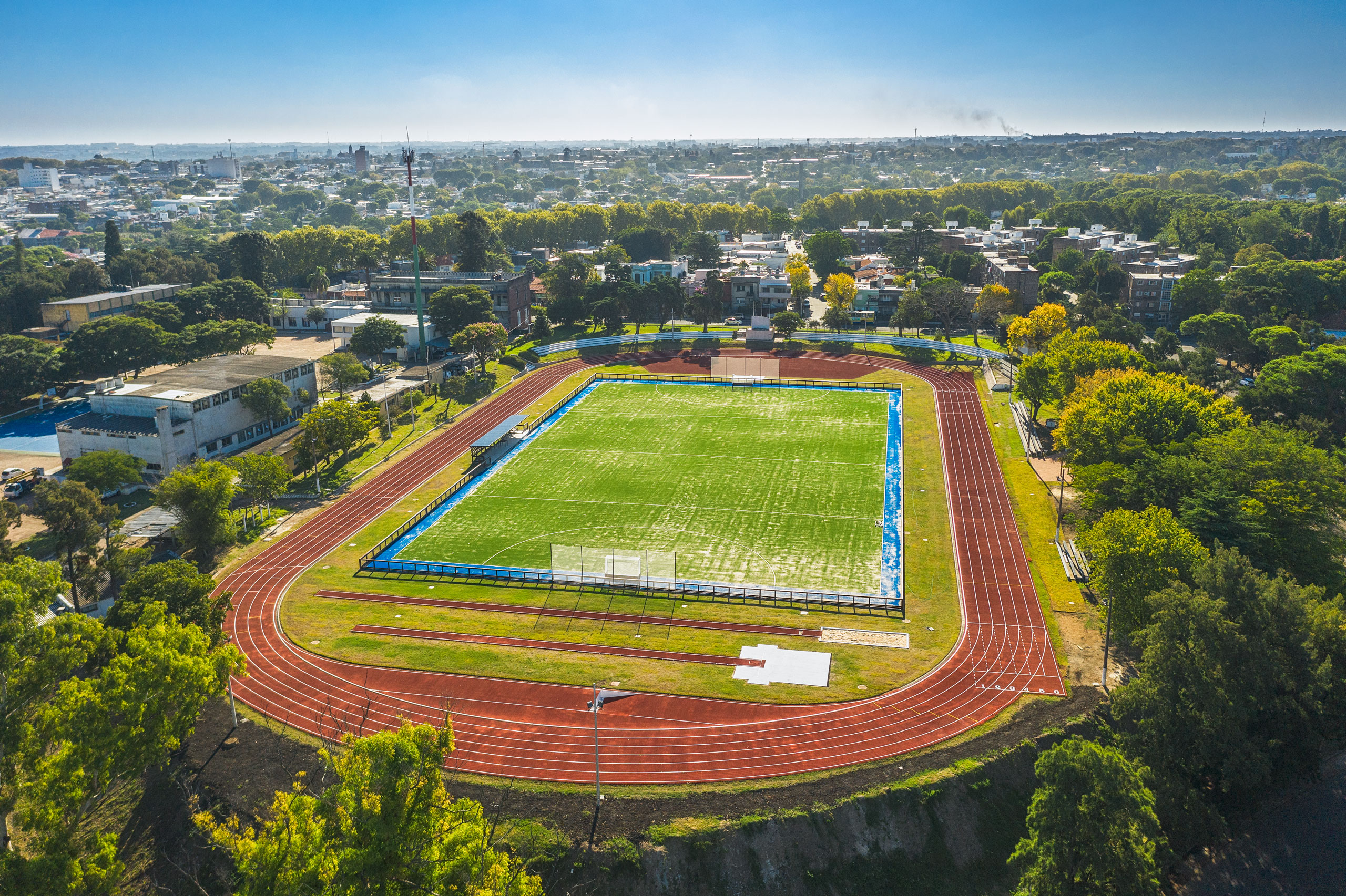
The Prado Athletics Track is part of the schools' complex.

Sports and physical training form part of student life at the Liceo Militar. Pre-military physical education is included in the curriculum, with students being assessed in athletics—such as long-distance running and the long jump—as well as calisthenics exercises, rope climbing and swimming. In addition to curricular physical education, the school maintains teams in several individual and team sports that compete in national competitions on an extracurricular basis, including handball, karate, volleyball, basketball, swimming, and football. The school complex includes the Prado Athletics Track, an indoor gymnasium, and an outdoor multi-purpose field.

=== Pre-military training ===
The school’s curriculum includes pre-military training that introduces students to the habits and discipline associated with military life. It includes close-order drill, flag handling, formations, and parades, as well as physical exercises and field activities aimed at developing endurance, coordination, and teamwork. Students also receive basic instruction in military history, tactics, and armed forces organization.

Students regularly take part in official parades held on national commemorative dates, such as Independence Day, marching in organized formations alongside other educational institutions, civil associations and military units. These appearances form part of civic ceremonies conducted at national and departmental levels.

== Organization and administration ==
Liceo Militar General Artigas is administered by the National Army of Uruguay, which is responsible for its overall management, organization, and operation. The school’s authorities are active-duty senior military officers who oversee academic, disciplinary, and administrative matters. The head of the institution is the Headmaster, a position held by an officer with the rank of Colonel, who reports to the Headmaster of the Military School, responsible for academic and technical supervision. The position of Deputy Headmaster is held by an officer with the rank of Lieutenant Colonel from the Command Corps.

Within the school operates the Asociación de Colaboración de Padres de Alumnos del Liceo Militar (Spanish for 'Parents’ Collaboration Association of the Military Lyceum'), which aims to support students throughout their secondary education and to provide assistance for educational activities and facilities. Additionally, the Asociación de Exalumnos del Liceo Militar (Spanish for 'Military Lyceum Alumni Association') seeks to promote and strengthen ties between former students and the institution, as well as to encourage cultural, social, and sporting activities.

== Headquarters ==
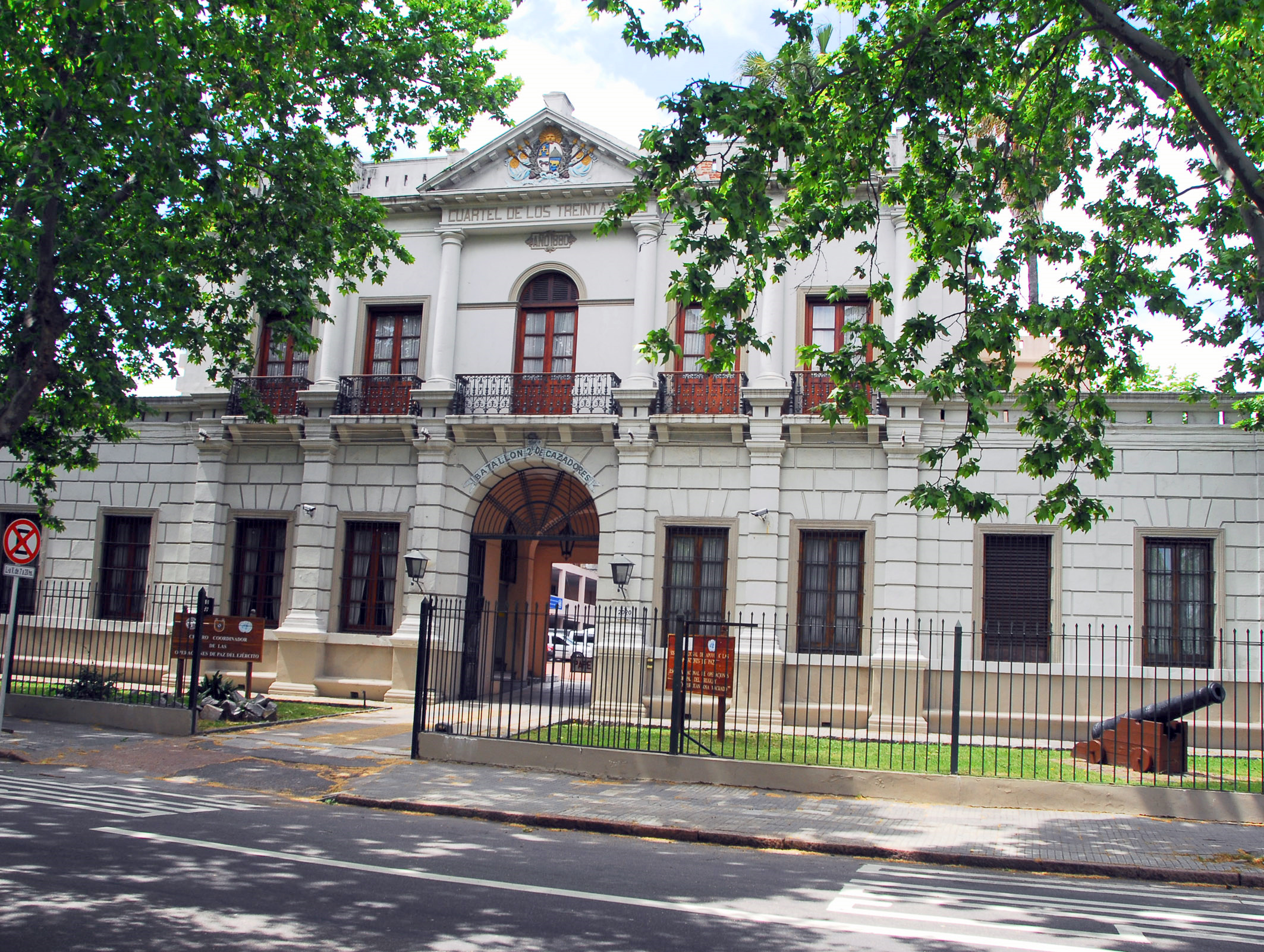
Liceo Militar headquarters, 1947–1948

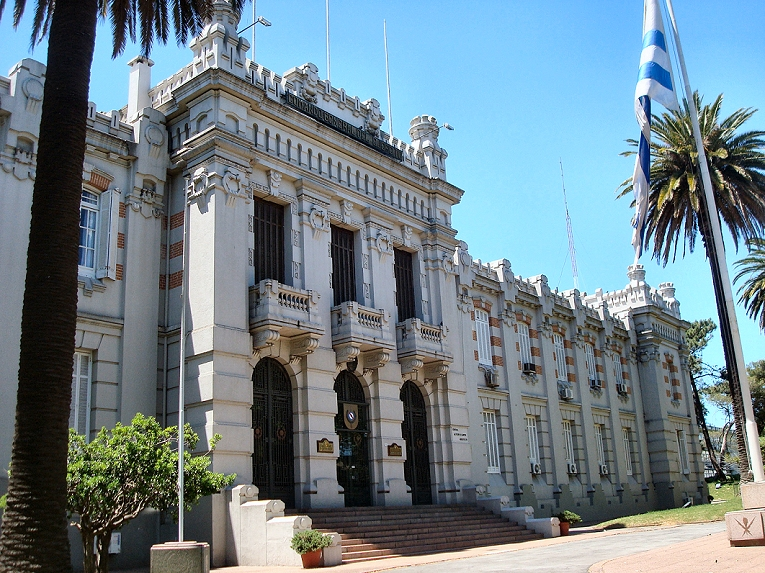
Liceo Militar headquarters, 1969–1979

From its foundation until 1948, the institute occupied part of the Cuartel de los Treinta y Tres Orientales, located on Eduardo Víctor Haedo Street in the Cordón neighborhood of Montevideo. The building currently houses the Uruguayan National School for Peacekeeping Operations.

On 10 December 1948, the school was relocated to the former military facility on Camino Castro, in the Prado neighborhood. The building had been constructed in the 1910s by architect and military officer Alfredo Campos and had previously housed several Army units, including the 1st Anti-Aircraft Group. The surrounding grounds had belonged to the French-born businessman José de Buschental, who, in the 1860s, established his estate known as Buen Retiro, where he built his residence and private park and installed the country’s first steam-powered mill.

From 1969 to 1979, the institute operated from an building located in the Jacinto Vera neighborhood. Constructed in 1909, it housed the Military School at the time, which was later relocated to Toledo. The building now serves as the headquarters of the General Command of the Army.
