= Toledo, Uruguay =

Toledo
- City & Municipality
- Location within Uruguay
- Coordinates: 34°44′32″S 56°05′54″W
- Country: Uruguay
- Department: Canelones
- Founded: 1889
- Elevation: 68 m (223 ft)

Population (2011 Census)
  - Total: 4,397
- Time zone: UTC -3
- Postal code: 91100
- Dial plan: +598 2 (+7 digits)

Toledo is a small city in the Canelones Department of Uruguay. Together with Villa Crespo y San Andrés and several other urban centres, it forms a municipality of more than 14,000, which is also generally known as Toledo, although the censual area of Toledo itself has only about 4,400 inhabitants, according to the 2011 census. They are both part of the wider metropolitan area of Montevideo.

The Uruguayan Military School is located in the area.

== Geography ==
=== Location ===
The city is located on Km. 22 of Route 6 and on its intersection with Route 85. The stream Arroyo de Toledo flows along the west and the south limits of the town.

== History ==
The town was founded on November 17, 1889. On 28 May 1928 it was declared a "Pueblo" (village) by the Act of Ley Nº 8.224, while on 24 October 1995, its status was elevated to "Ciudad" (city) by the Act of Ley Nº 16.721.

== Population ==
In 2011 Toledo had a population of 4,397. The Intendencia de Canelones has estimated a population of 16,197 for the municipality.

Location map of the Municipality of Toledo

Year	Population
1963	1,699
1975	3,065
1985	3,321
1996	3,487
2004	4,028
2011	4,397

Source: Instituto Nacional de Estadística de Uruguay

== Places of worship ==
- Parish Church of Our Lady of Mt. Carmel (Roman Catholic)
- Former Archdiocesan Seminary (since 1969, a military facility), a national landmark by Architect Mario Payssé Reyes

== Government ==
The city mayor as of July 2010 is Álvaro Gómez.

== Notable people ==
- José Giménez (born 1995), footballer.
