= List of equipment of the Uruguayan Army =

This is a list of equipment of the Uruguayan Army (Ejército Nacional) currently in service.

== Small arms ==
Name	Image	Caliber	Type	Origin	Notes
Pistols
Glock 17		9×19mm	Semi-automatic pistol	Austria	1,400 purchased in 2015.
SIG Sauer P220		9×19mm	Semi-automatic pistol	Switzerland	
Heckler & Koch HK4		.380 ACP	Semi-automatic pistol	Germany	
Heckler & Koch P7M8		9×19mm	Semi-automatic pistol	Germany	
Submachine guns
FMK-3		9×19mm	Submachine gun	Argentina	
Heckler & Koch MP5		9×19mm	Submachine gun	Germany	
Uzi		9×19mm	Submachine gun	Israel	
Star Model Z-45		9×23mm	Submachine gun	Spain	
Rifles
AK-101		5.56×45mm	Assault rifle	Russia	Used by peacekeepers in Congo.
AK-103		7.62×39mm	Assault rifle	Russia	
M16A1		5.56×45mm	Assault rifle	United States	
M4A1		5.56×45mm	Assault rifle	United States	
Bushmaster M4		5.56×45mm	Assault rifle	United States	
Steyr AUG A2UR		5.56×45mm	Bullpup; Assault rifle	Austria	
FN FAL		7.62×51mm	Battle rifle	Belgium	
Sniper rifles
Heckler & Koch PSG1		7.62×51mm	DMR; Sniper rifle	Germany	
Machine guns
FN MAG		7.62×51mm	General-purpose machine gun	Belgium	
MG-3		7.62×51mm	General-purpose machine gun	Germany	Replacing the FN MAG.
Browning M1918		.30-06 Springfield	Light machine gun	United States	
Browning M1919		.30-06 Springfield	Medium machine gun	United States	M1919A4 and M1919A6 models used.
Browning M2		.50 BMG	Heavy machine gun	United States	M2HB model used.
Grenade launchers
STK 40		40×46mm	Automatic grenade launcher	Singapore	

== Tanks ==
Name	Image	Type	Origin	Quantity	Notes
M41 Walker Bulldog		Light tank	United States	47	22 M41A1UR; 25 M41C
Ti-67		Main battle tank	Soviet Union; Israel	15	Ex-Israeli

== Infantry fighting vehicles ==
Name	Image	Type	Origin	Quantity	Notes
BVP-1		Infantry fighting vehicle	Soviet Union; Czechoslovakia	18	

== Scout cars ==
Name	Image	Type	Origin	Quantity	Notes
EE-3 Jararaca		Scout car	Brazil	16	

== Mine-Resistant Ambush Protected ==
Name	Image	Type	Origin	Quantity	Notes
Katmerciler Hızır		MRAP	Turkey	1	
Oshkosh M-ATV		MRAP	United States	6/36	
Mamba APC		MRAP	South Africa	13	

== Armored personnel carriers ==
Name	Image	Type	Origin	Quantity	Notes
MT-LB		Amphibious Armored personnel carrier	Soviet Union	3	
OT-64 SKOT		Amphibious Armored personnel carrier	Czechoslovakia	100	53 OT-64; 47 OT-93
M113A2UR		Armored personnel carrier	United States	24	Local modernization.
Condor UR-425		Armored personnel carrier	Germany	55	
GAZ-3937 Vodnik		Infantry mobility vehicle	Russia	48	
EE-11 Urutu		Amphibious Armored personnel carrier	Brazil	29	

== Reconnaissance ==
Name	Image	Type	Origin	Quantity	Notes
EE-9 Cascavel		Armored Car	Brazil	15	Delivered from Brazil in 1985.
LAV-I Cougar		Armored fighting vehicle	Canada	147	44 Cougar Reconnaissance; 98 Grizzly APC; 5 Husky ARV

== Military engineering vehicles ==
Name	Image	Type	Origin	Quantity	Notes
PTS		Amphibious vehicle	Soviet Union	2	

== Utility vehicles ==
Name	Image	Type	Origin	Quantity	Notes
UAZ-469		Utility vehicle	Soviet Union	169	
Land Rover Defender		Utility vehicle	United Kingdom	40	110SW
Toyota Hilux		Utility vehicle	Japan	Unknown	
M151		Utility vehicle	United States	Unknown	
Jeep J8		Utility vehicle	United States	Unknown	
Ural-4320		Utility truck	Soviet Union	500	
Oshkosh MTVR		Utility truck	United States	6/60	

== Artillery ==
Name	Image	Type	Origin	Quantity	Notes
Self-propelled artillery
2S1 Gvozdika		Self-propelled artillery	Soviet Union	6	Delivered from Czech Republic in 1998.
M108AP		Self-propelled artillery	United States	10	Supplied from Brazil
Rocket artillery
RM-70		Multiple rocket launcher	Czechoslovakia	4	
Mortars
M1		Mortar	United States	35	
Field artillery
M101		Howitzer	United States	60	Delivered from South Korea in 1981.
M114A2		Howitzer	United States	8	Delivered from South Korea in 1981.
M102		Howitzer	United States	15	Delivered from United States in 1972.

== Anti-tank weapons ==
Name	Image	Type	Origin	Quantity	Notes
M40A1		Recoilless rifle	United States	69	
MILAN		Anti-tank missile	France; Germany	438	

== Air defence systems ==
Name	Image	Type	Origin	Quantity	Notes
Bofors L/60		Autocannon	Sweden	8	
M167 VADS		Rotary cannon	United States	6	

== Bibliography ==
- Jones, Richard D.; Ness, Leland S., eds. (2010). Jane's Infantry Weapons 2010-2011 (36th ed.). Jane's Information Group. ISBN 978-0-7106-2908-1.
