= Arroyo de Toledo =

River in Uruguay

Coordinates: 34°49′S 56°03′W

Arroyo de Toledo is a river in Uruguay.

Arroyo de Toledo runs in the area of the Departments of Canelones and Montevideo, as the border line of which it serves. According to Orestes Araújo, it rises about four kilometers east of Punta del Burro in the Maldonado Department. It carries little water and sinks before it can pour into the sea. South of the town of Joaquín Suárez meets the Arroyo Meireles on its left hand. According to Isidoro de María, the name of the river goes back to a simple settler of the same name in this area.
