= JPX (Brazilian company) =

Brazilian automobile manufacturer

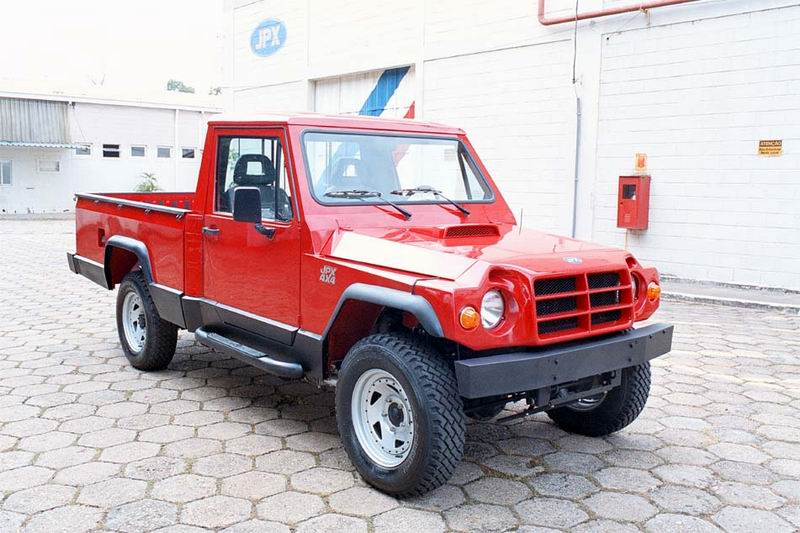
JPX Montez Pickup

JPX do Brasil Ltda. was a Brazilian automobile manufacturer and was part of Groupe EBX. Founded in 1992 by the businessman Eike Batista and headquartered in Pouso Alegre, Minas Gerais, JPX produced an adapted version of the French Auverland sport utility vehicle.

Batista's inexperience in the automaking industry and a series of mistakes led to the closing of the company in 2002, being the first failed venture of the billionaire, once the eighth-richest man in the world.

== History ==
Batista's aim was to develop a utility vehicle to serve his mining company activities, as well as the Armed Forces and the general public. Based on the Auverland A-3 used by the French Army, the company produced a car model, the JPX Montez, available in the SUV and pickup versions. The Montez was equipped with imported Peugeot's XUD-9A diesel engine and BA 7/5 gearbox, Carraro's axles and differentials. The body and chassis were made in Brazil. JPX sales were lower than expected: the projection was of 400 units sold/month, but the demand was of 200 units/month; most of them were issued to the army, park rangers and fire departments. Besides, the engines were not adapted to the diesel composition sold in the country and had overheating issues, due to a turbocompressor adapted to it. On the other hand, the cars' suspension was praised by its owners. The company's activities were terminated in 2002. JPX produced nearly three thousand units. Of these ones, roughly a thousand are still on the roads.

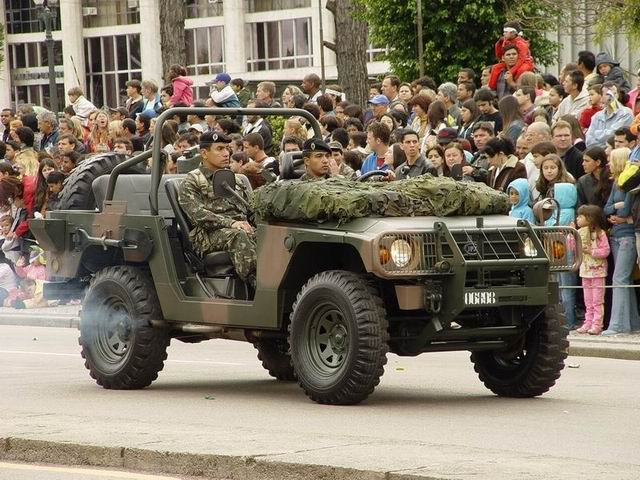
Brazilian Army JPX

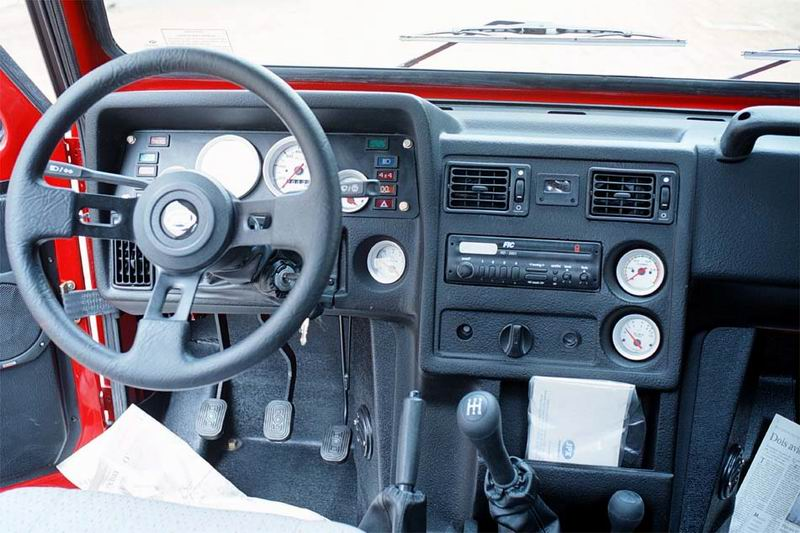
JPX dashboard

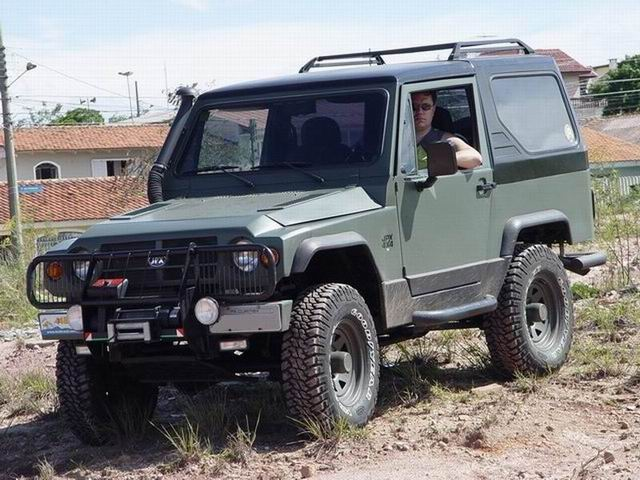
Civilian JPX
