= National Army (Uruguay) =

- Ejército Nacional (Spanish)
- Flag of Uruguayan Army
- Founded: 18 May 1811; 215 years ago
- Country: Uruguay
- Type: Army
- Role: National defense
- Size: 15,000 permanent personnel ~400,000 reserve personnel
- Part of: Armed Forces of Uruguay
- Garrison/HQ: Montevideo
- Motto: The force of all
- Colors: Blue, red and white
- March: August the 25th
- Equipment: Equipment
- Engagements: Cisplatine War; Uruguayan Civil War; Paraguayan War; Uruguayan War; Revolution of the Lances; Tricolor Revolution; Revolution of the Quebracho; Revolution of 1897; Revolution of 1904; Chirinada (1935)
- Website: https://www.ejercito.mil.uy

Commanders
- Commander in chief: President Yamandú Orsi
- Army General: Mario Stevenazzi

The National Army of Uruguay (Spanish: Ejército Nacional del Uruguay) is the land force branch of the Armed Forces of the Oriental Republic of Uruguay. The largest military branch, it is organized and trained to plan, execute and conduct the military actions for National Defense in the terrestrial sphere. It has its roots in the military campaigns of General José Gervasio Artigas within the framework of the Oriental revolution.

== Mission ==
The National Army serves as the land-based branch of the Uruguayan Armed Forces. In accordance with Decree-Law 15,688, its mission is to contribute to guaranteeing external and internal national security, within the framework of the mission of the Armed Forces.

== Organization ==
According to Law No. 9,943 of July 27, 1940, the National Army of Uruguay is composed as follows:

Active Army, which includes:

- Permanent Army: composed of contracted volunteers aged 18 to 45, organized into four divisions and five branches. In peacetime, this constitutes the effective force of the National Army.
- Active Reserve: made up of all citizens aged 18 to 30 who are fit for service and have no children under their care.
- Auxiliary Forces: composed of personnel assimilated into the troops and services, civilians working in any branch of the Ministry of National Defense, and police forces that come under the authority of Regional Commanders upon mobilization.

Mobile Reserve: made up of citizens aged 31 to 45, and citizens aged 18 to 30 with children under their care. It is intended to reinforce the aforementioned forces, support complementary services of the Active Army, or ensure the occupation of the rear zone.

Territorial Reserve: composed of citizens aged 46 to 60, to be mobilized with the purpose of ensuring the operation of essential services for the country's livelihood and for the military forces, or to form garrison troops outside the operational zone.

The National Army is organized into four divisions, with each one grouping a certain number of departments. The Commander in Chief is the highest ranking officer of the branch, who reports directly to the President of Uruguay, acting with the Minister of National Defense, or in the Council of Ministers.

== Educational and instruction ==
- Liceo Militar General Artigas (General Artigas Military High School)
- Escuela Militar (Military School)
- IMAE Instituto Militar de Armas y Especialidades (Military Institute of Arms and Specialties)
- IMES Instituto Militar de Estudios Superiores (Military Institute of Advanced Studies)
- Escuela de Ingenieros del Ejército (Army Engineers School)
- ECOME Escuela de Comunicaciones del Ejército (Army School of Communications)
- C.I.A.C.A. Centro de Instrucción de Artillería de Campaña y Antiaérea "Cnel. Antonio E. Trifoglio" (Field and Air Defense Artillery Instruction Center "Cnel. Antonio E. Trifoglio")
- CIMA Centro de Instrucción de Material y Armamento (Material and Armament Instruction Center)
- Comisión de Ciencia y Tecnología del Ejército (Army Science and Technology Commission)

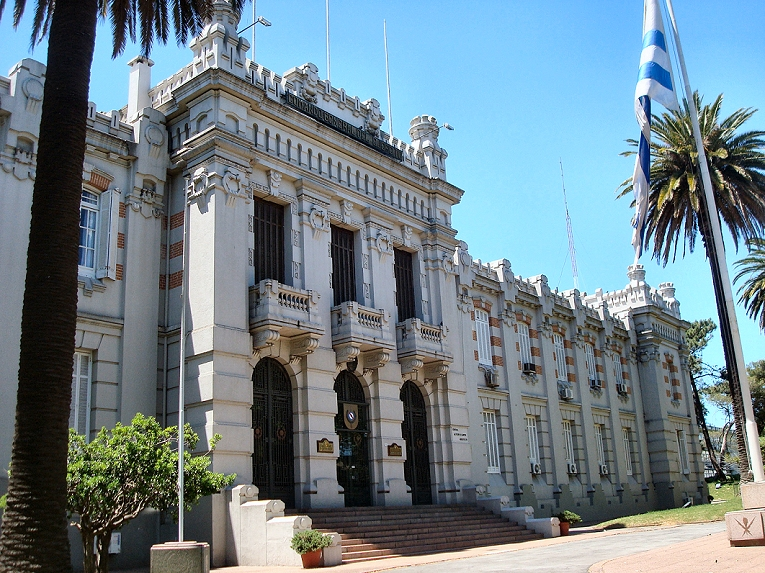
Army Headquarters

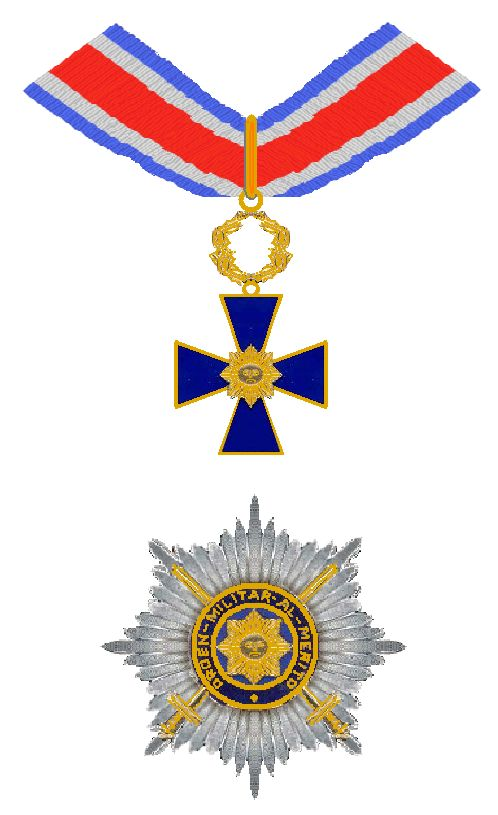
Military Merit Order of Lieutenants of Artigas.

== List of commanders-in-chief of the army (1973–Present) ==
Commander-in-Chief	Took office	Left office	Notes
General César Martínez	1973	1973	
General José Verocay	1973	1973	
General Hugo Chiappe Posse	1973	1974	
Lieutenant General Julio César Vadora	1974	1978	
Lieutenant General Gregorio Álvarez	1978	1979	
Lieutenant General Luis Vicente Queirolo	1979	1982	
Lieutenant General Boscán Hontou	1982	1984	
Lieutenant General Pedro J. Aranco	1984	1984	
Lieutenant General Hugo Medina	1984	1987	
Lieutenant General Carlos Berois	1987	1990	
Lieutenant General Guillermo de Nava	1990	1992	
Lieutenant General Juan Modesto Rebollo	1992	1993	
Lieutenant General Daniel García	1993	1995	
Lieutenant General Juan Curutchet	1995	1996	
Lieutenant General Raúl Mermot	1996	1998	
Lieutenant General Fernán Amado	1998	1999	
Lieutenant General Juan Geymonat	1999	2001	
Lieutenant General Carlos Daners	2001	2003	
Lieutenant General Santiago Pomoli	2003	2005	
Lieutenant General Ángel Bertolotti	2005	2006	
Lieutenant General Carlos Díaz Moussampés	2006	2006	
Army General Jorge Rosales Sosa	2006	2011	
Army General Pedro Aguerre Siqueira	2011	2014	
Army General Juan Villagrán	2014	2015	
Army General Guido Manini Ríos	2015	2019	
Army General José González Spalatto	2019	2019	
Army General Claudio Feola	2019	2020	
Army General Gerardo Fregosi	2020	2023	
Army General Mario Stevenazzi	2023	Present	

== Ranks ==
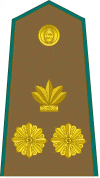
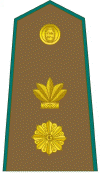
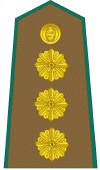
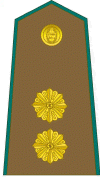
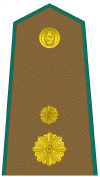
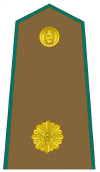
Rank group	General / flag officers		Senior officers			Junior officers
National Army of Uruguay
National Army of Uruguay	General de ejército	General	Coronel	Teniente coronel	Mayor	Capitán	Teniente primero	Teniente segundo	Alférez

Rank group	Senior NCOs			Junior NCOs		Enlisted
National Army of Uruguay						No insignia
National Army of Uruguay	Suboficial mayor	Sargento de primera	Sargento	Cabo de primera	Cabo de segunda	Soldado de primera	Aprendiz
