= Uruguay Military School =

Military school in Uruguay

Uruguayan Military School
- Escuela Militar de Uruguay
- Type: Military academy
- Established: August 25, 1885; 140 years ago
- Headmaster: General Jorge Porciúncula
- Location: Toledo, Uruguay; 34.7430°S 56.0943°W
- Colors: Red, white and blue
- Website: Military School

The Uruguayan Military School (Spanish: Escuela Militar de Uruguay) is the service academy that trains cadets for the Uruguayan National Army. Founded in 1885, it has had its headquarters in Toledo, Canelones Department since 1969.

== History ==
In March 1884, within the framework of the militarism (1875–1890), a bill was presented proposing the creation of a training center for candidates for service in the officer corps. Due to this, the Colegio Militar del Uruguay (Spanish for 'Military College of Uruguay') was founded on August 25, 1885 through a decree promulgated by the then Minister of War, Máximo Tajes. It was established in Quinta de Casaravilla, an estate on the outskirts of Montevideo.

In 1909, the architect and military officer Alfredo Campos was commissioned to construct a new building to house the institution. On August 25, 1910, the new headquarters located in the Jacinto Vera neighborhood was inaugurated. In 1935 a preparatory year was added to the curriculum and in 1966 the curriculum was reformed. In 1969 the headquarters were moved again to a piece of land located in the town of Toledo, in the Canelones Department.

In 1993, the Military School was recognized by the Ministry of Education and Culture as a tertiary education center. Likewise, in December 1997, a decree opening the service academy to women was promulgated by President Julio María Sanguinetti.

== Curriculum ==
The Military School is a full-time residential academy, which provides four-year tertiary education in professional, scientific-technical subjects and physical education.

== Campus ==
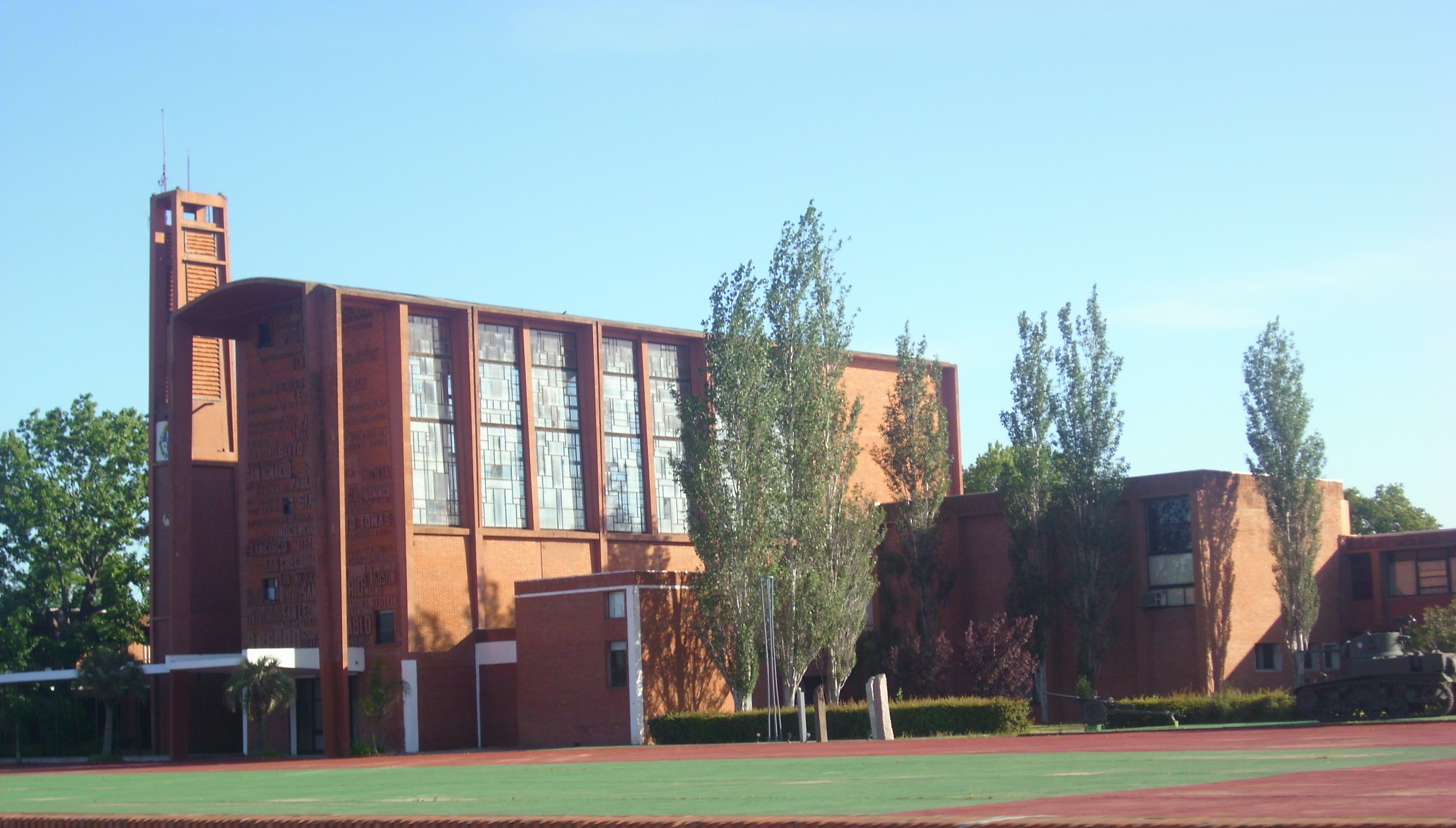
Looking toward the central campus

The academy is located approximately 13 miles (21 km) north of Montevideo, in the town of Toledo, in the Canelones Department.
