= Castaibert aircraft =

Series of aircraft

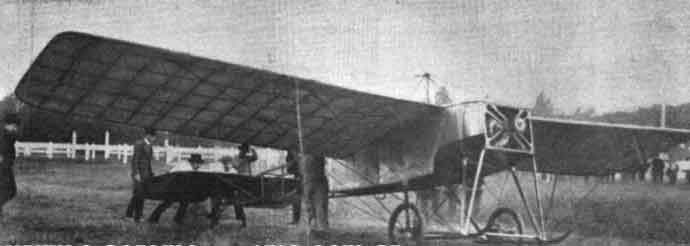
Castaibert IV 1913 monoplane

The Castaibert were a series of monoplane aeroplanes were designed and built by Pablo (Paul) Castaibert, a Frenchman living in Argentina, in the years before and during World War I. His designs were inspired by aircraft he had seen in France.

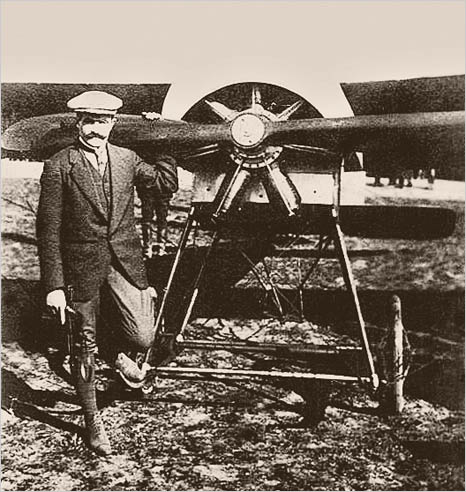
Pablo Castaibert

== Variants ==
- Castaibert I – Built in 1910, not capable of flight.
- Castaibert II – Built in 1911.
- Castaibert III – Built in 1912.
- Castaibert IV – Built in 1913. Four delivered to the Escuela Militar de Aviación in Uruguay.
- Castaibert V – Built in 1914. One delivered to Uruguay.
- Castaibert VI – Built in 1915.
- Castaibert VII – Built in 1915.

== Operators ==
- Argentine Air Force
- Uruguayan Air Force

== See also ==
- Raúl Pateras Pescara
- IMPA Tu-Sa
- Tucán T-1
