= Rodolfo Pereyra Martínez =

Rodolfo Pereyra
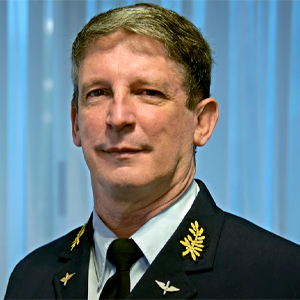

Chief of the Defence Staff of Uruguay
- Incumbent
- Assumed office 7 April 2022
- President: Luis Lacalle Pou
- Preceded by: Gustavo Fajardo

Personal details
- Born: Rodolfo Daniel Pereyra Martínez; April 26, 1966 (age 60) Montevideo, Uruguay
- Education: Escuela Militar de Aeronáutica

Military service
- Allegiance: Uruguay
- Branch/service: Uruguayan Air Force
- Years of service: 1987 —present
- Rank: General of the Air

Rodolfo Daniel Pereyra Martínez (born 26 April 1966) is a Uruguayan Air Force general of the air who serves as Chief of the Defence Staff of the Uruguayan Armed Forces since April 7, 2022.

== Early life and education ==
Rodolfo Pereyra Martínez was born in 1966 in Montevideo. At eighteen, in 1984 he enrolled in the Military School of Aeronautics, graduating in December 1987 as Ensign Aviator.

== Military career ==
While holding the rank of Second Lieutenant until he was promoted to captain, Pereyra remained with the Air Force's No. 1 (Attack) Air Squadron, performing aircraft maintenance tasks and air operations. In 1999 while serving as IA-58 Maintenance Chief and Check Pilot, he participated in the first test flight of an FMA IA-58 Pucará, assembled for the first time in Uruguay.

In 2002, he received the Air Force Flight Safety Merit Award thanks to the correct resolution of an in-flight emergency that managed to prevent material and human damage. In 2003, he was promoted to the rank of Major, and was appointed Second Commander of the No. 2 Air Base Squadron. From 2005 to 2007, he served as Commander of the No. 1 Air Squadron (Attack). In February 2007, he was promoted to the rank of Lieutenant Colonel, being appointed to the position of Chief of the Basic Air Command and Staff Course at the Air Command and Staff School, where he was part of the implementation of the first virtual air combat game, "Phoenix".

In February 2009, he was appointed Advisor to the General Staff of the Air Operations Command, a position he held until September of the same year in which he was appointed Commander of the Air Surveillance Squadron. In February 2011, Pereyra was promoted to the rank of Colonel and was appointed director of Air Operations, being in turn responsible for the Air Operations Center and the Air Surveillance Squadron. Four years later, in 2015, he was assigned to the Military House as aide-de-camp to President Tabaré Vázquez. On February 1, 2019, he was promoted to the rank of Brigadier General (Aviator), and that year he took office as head of the National Directorate of Civil Aviation and Aeronautical Infrastructure (DINACIA).

On July 22, 2020, Pereyra took office as Chief of Staff of the Air Force.

== Chief of the Defense Staff ==
On March 9, 2022, the Ministry of National Defense announced the appointment of Pereyra as Chief of the Defence Staff, succeeding Gustavo Fajardo, who had requested retirement. On March 14, 2020, he was promoted to the rank of General of the Air – the highest rank within the Air Force, granted only to the commander-in-chief of the branch and to the Chief of the Defense Staff belonging to the branch. Pereyra took office on April 7, in a ceremony attended by President Luis Lacalle Pou and Vice President Beatriz Argimón.

== Flight Information ==
Rating: Command Pilot

Flight Hours: 2500

Aircraft Flown: T-41, T-34, T-6, IA-58
