= FMA I.Ae.20 El Boyero =

FMA 20 El Boyero
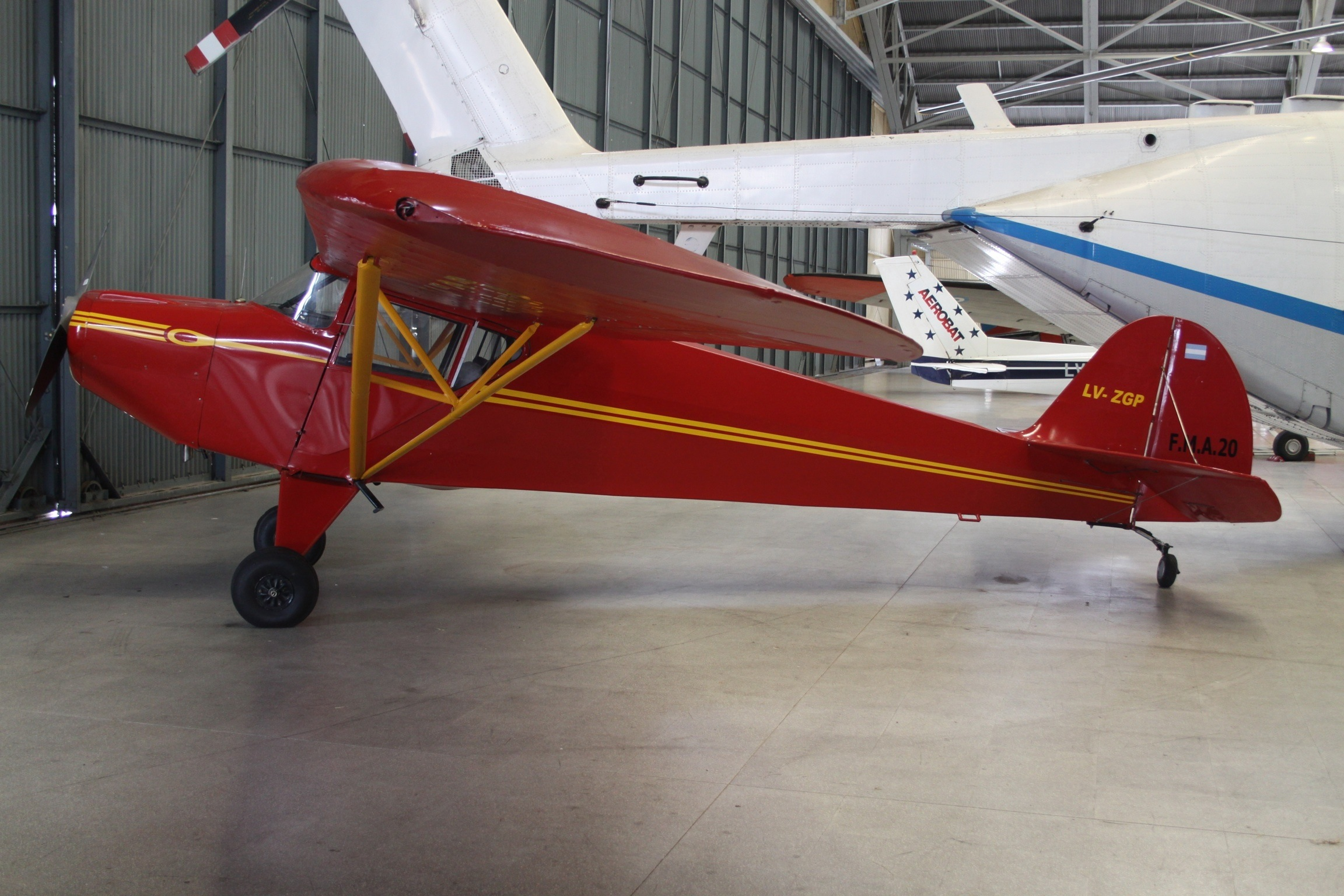
- A FMA I.Ae.20 El Boyero on display at the Museo Nacional de Aeronáutica de Argentina

General information
- Type: Utility aircraft
- Manufacturer: FMA, Petrolini Hermanos
- Designer: Juan Peretti
- Number built: 132

History
- First flight: 2 November 1940

The FMA 20 El Boyero ("Shepherd") was a light utility aircraft produced in Argentina in the 1940s. It was a conventional high-wing strut-braced monoplane with a fixed tailskid undercarriage, seating two side by side in an enclosed cabin.

== Development ==
The Fábrica Argentina de Aviones (FMA) began design work on the El Boyero in 1939, to meet the needs of Argentine flying clubs for a training aircraft. Two prototypes were built, with the first, powered by a 50 hp (37 kW) Continental A50 flat four engine, flying on 2 November 1940, and the second early the following year. The El Boyero was a single-engine tractor high-wing monoplane, with a fixed tailwheel undercarriage. Its fuselage had a steel tube structure with fabric covering, while the aircraft's wing, which was braced to the fuselage with steel tube struts, had spars of spruce, with ribs of aluminium alloy. Pilot and instructor sat side-by-side in an enclosed cabin, and were provided with dual controls.

As FMA was busy building military aircraft production rights were sold to the private firm Sfreddo y Paolini but they were unable to start production due to a shortage of materials and equipment as a result of the Second World War. After the end of the war, production rights were re-assigned to Petrolini Hermanos. This company received an order for 160 aircraft from the Argentine government, (Note: 150 according to Simpson) and commenced deliveries in January 1949.

== Operational history ==
The aircraft, powered by 65 hp (48 kW) Continental A65-8 or 75 hp (56 kW) Continental A-75 engines, (Note: Aircraft with the 75 hp engine were designated Ae20B) were distributed to Argentina's aeroclubs and to the military, which used it as a spotter and liaison aircraft. Petrolini experienced great difficulties sourcing sufficient materials to complete the order, and in 1951 ceased production, having completed 130 aircraft.

== Operators ==
Argentina

- Argentine Air Force
- Argentine Army
- Argentine National Gendarmerie

== Specifications ==
Data from Jane's All the World's Aircraft 1948

General characteristics

- Crew: One pilot
- Capacity: 1 passenger
- Length: 7.10 m (23 ft 4 in)
- Wingspan: 11.50 m (37 ft 9 in)
- Height: 1.80 m (5 ft 11 in)
- Wing area: 17.7 m^{2} (191 sq ft)
- Airfoil: NACA 23012
- Empty weight: 325 kg (717 lb)
- Gross weight: 550 kg (1,213 lb)
- Fuel capacity: 70 L (18 US gal; 15 imp gal)
- Powerplant: 1 × Continental A65 air-cooled flat-four engine, 48 kW (65 hp)

Performance

- Maximum speed: 167 km/h (104 mph, 90 kn)
- Cruise speed: 140 km/h (87 mph, 76 kn)
- Range: 650 km (400 mi, 350 nmi)
- Service ceiling: 4,000 m (13,100 ft)

== See also ==
- IMPA Tu-Sa
- Tucán T-1
