= Enrique Bonelli =

Uruguayan general

13th Commander-in-Chief of the Uruguayan Air Force
- In office 2 February 2004 – 2 February 2009
- President: Jorge Batlle; Tabaré Vázquez
- Preceded by: José Pedro Malaquín
- Succeeded by: José Bonilla

Personal details
- Born: 9 January 1950 (age 76) Montevideo, Uruguay
- Spouse: María Sayagués
- Education: Military School of Aeronautics

Military service
- Allegiance: Uruguay
- Branch/service: Uruguayan Air Force
- Years of service: 1971 – 2009
- Rank: Lieutenant General
- Commands: Aviation Group No. 4 Technical School of Aeronautics Military School of Aeronautics Uruguayan Air Force General Command
- Awards: Medal of Aeronautical Merit

Enrique Bonelli (born 9 January 1950) is a retired Uruguayan Lieutenant General who served as the 13th Commander-in-Chief of the Uruguayan Air Force from 2004 to 2009.

== Early life ==
Bonelli studied primary and secondary education in Montevideo. Upon completing his studies, he entered the Military School of Aeronautics of the Uruguayan Air Force on 1 February 1968, graduating as Ensign and military pilot of the Air Force on 15 November 1971. The flight course at that time was done in Cessna T-41D Mescalero light training aircraft.

== Military career ==
As Ensign of the Air Force, Bonelli first assignment was the Service Unit of the "Captain Boiso Lanza" Airdrome in Montevideo. Months later he was transferred to Air Brigade II in Santa Bernardina, Durazno, for his advanced flight training in North American T- 6 Texan.

After he completed all his basic and advanced flight training, in 1972 he was assigned to the Aviation Group No. 3 in Carrasco, where he began to specialize as a military transport aircraft pilot in Douglas C-47 Skytrain aircraft. Then, as Second Lieutenant in 1974, he was transferred to the Aviation Group No. 4, also based in Carrasco. In this unit, Bonelli was trained in twin-turboprop aircraft, qualifying as Piloto Principal (Principal Pilot) of Fokker F27 Friendship and Fairchild Hiller FH-227D. He would later qualify as an instructor pilot for both of these aircraft, and in 1985, appointed Chief of this Aviation Group, position that he would hold until 1987, when he was assigned to the Military School of Aeronautics, with the rank of Major.

As a transport pilot, he not only carried out missions all over the Americas, but also to Antarctica.

In 1988 he was promoted to Lieutenant Colonel and appointed Chief of the Personnel and Teaching Division of the Air Training Command, a position he held until 1989, when he was entrusted with the role of Chief of the Evaluation Department of the Air Command and Staff School of the Uruguayan Air Force.

Through a contest of merit and opposition, in 1991 he was assigned as Chief of the Purchasing Office of the Uruguayan Air Force in the city of Miami, United States of America. Bonelli was director of the two main school of the Uruguayan Air Force. In 1996 he was chosen to assume the position of Director of the Technical School of Aeronautics and two years later, in 1998, the Direction of the Military School of Aeronautics. During this time, while fulfilment of this assignment, Bonelli was responsible for carrying out the ferry flight mission of two Beechcraft Baron 58 from the United States of America to Uruguay, mission that was completed without problems.

On 1 February 2004, he was promoted to Lieutenant General and assigned the maximum position of Commander-in-Chief of the Uruguayan Air Force, under the presidency of Jorge Batlle. When Tabaré Vázquez assumed office as the 39th President of Uruguay, Bonelli remained in charge, and was then succeed as Commander-in-Chief of the Air Force by José Bonilla on 2 February 2009, marking his retirement from the Uruguayan Air Force. He was later awarded the Medal of Aeronautical Merit, on 11 May 2009.

== Flight Information ==
Rating: Command Pilot

Flight hours: More than 5,000

Aircraft flown: T-41D, T-6, C-47, F27, FH-227D, C-130B, UB-58
