= Turbay T-3 =

T-3
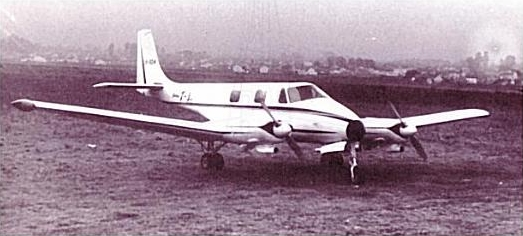
- Turbay T-3A

General information
- Type: seven-seater light transport
- National origin: Argentina
- Manufacturer: Turbay S.A.
- Designer: Alfredo Turbay
- Number built: 1

History
- First flight: 8 December 1964

The Turbay T-3A was an Argentine twin-engined seven-seater light transport of the 1960s. A single example was built, but no production followed.

== Development and design ==
In 1957, the Argentine aircraft designer Alfredo Turbay began work on a twin-engined STOL light transport, the Turbay T-3A, with Turbay S.A. formed at Buenos Aires in January 1961 to build the new design. The T-3A was a low-wing cantilever monoplane of all metal construction. It was powered by two 130 kW (180 hp) Lycoming O-360-A1D air-cooled four-cylinder horizontally-opposed engines driving two-bladed propellers, and was fitted with a retractable nosewheel undercarriage.

Alfredo Turbay piloted the T-3A on its first flight on 8 December 1964. Production was planned of the T-3B, which was to be fitted with 190–260 kW (250–350 hp) Lycoming or Continental engines, giving improved performance. These plans did not come to fruition, with the prototype T-3B never completed, and no production occurring.

== Specifications ==
Data from Jane's All The World's Aircraft 1966–67, Jane's All the World's Aircraft 1962-63

General characteristics

- Crew: 1
- Capacity: 6 passengers / 522 kg (1,151 lb) max. payload / tanks for 800 L (211 US gal; 176 imp gal) chemicals for spraying
- Length: 9.40 m (30 ft 10 in)
- Wingspan: 13.52 m (44 ft 4 in)
- Height: 3.60 m (11 ft 10 in)
- Wing area: 24.08 m^{2} (259.2 sq ft)
- Aspect ratio: 7.5:1
- Airfoil: NACA 23024 at root, NACA 4412 at tip
- Empty weight: 1,034 kg (2,280 lb) equipped
- Max. zero-fuel weight: 1,725 kg (3,803 lb)
- Max takeoff weight: 1,860 kg (4,101 lb) (MTOW and MLW)
- Fuel capacity: 360 L (95 US gal; 79 imp gal) in four wing tanks, with provision for 2x 80 L (21 US gal; 18 imp gal) external tanks; 24 L (6 US gal; 5 imp gal) oil
- Powerplant: 2 × Lycoming O-360-A1D 4-cylinder air-cooled horizontally-opposed piston engines, 130 kW (180 hp) each
- Propellers: 2-bladed Hartzell HC-92 zk-2b/8447-12A metal propellers

Performance

- Maximum speed: 318 km/h (198 mph, 172 kn)
- Cruise speed: 230 km/h (140 mph, 120 kn) (econ. cruise)

255 km/h (158 mph; 138 kn) maximum cruising speed

- Stall speed: 85.4 km/h (53.1 mph, 46.1 kn)
- Never exceed speed: 342 km/h (213 mph, 185 kn)
- Range: 1,380 km (860 mi, 750 nmi) with maximum payload, zero wind

1,840 km (1,143 mi; 994 nmi) with maximum fuel, zero wind

- Service ceiling: 7,600 m (24,900 ft)

3,500 m (11,483 ft) with one engine inoperative

- Rate of climb: 6.6 m/s (1,300 ft/min)
- Wing loading: 77 kg/m^{2} (16 lb/sq ft)
- Power/mass: 0.1442 kW/kg (0.0877 hp/lb)
- Take-off run: 118 m (387 ft)
- Take-off distance to 15.25 m (50 ft): 225 m (738 ft)
- Landing run: 100 m (328 ft)
- Landing distance from 15 m (49 ft): 180 m (591 ft)

Avionics

- Motorola VHF radio
- ADF
- Blind flying instrumantation

== See also ==
- Turbay T-1 Tucán
- IMPA Tu-Sa
