= Military ranks of Uruguay =

The Military ranks of Uruguay are the military insignia used by the Armed Forces of Uruguay.

== Commissioned officer ranks ==
The rank insignia of commissioned officers.

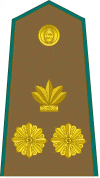
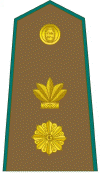
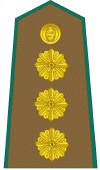
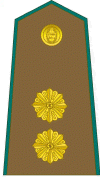
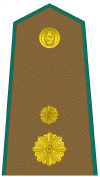
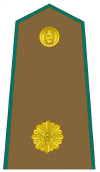
Rank group	General / flag officers		Senior officers			Junior officers
National Army of Uruguay
National Army of Uruguay	General de ejército	General	Coronel	Teniente coronel	Mayor	Capitán	Teniente primero	Teniente segundo	Alférez
National Navy of Uruguay
National Navy of Uruguay	Almirante	Contraalmirante	Capitán de navío	Capitán de fragata	Capitán de corbeta	Teniente de navío	Alférez de navio	Alférez de fragata	Guardiamarina
Uruguayan Air Force
Uruguayan Air Force	General del Aire	Brigadier general	Coronel	Teniente coronel	Mayor	Capitán	Teniente primero	Teniente segundo	Alférez
Rank group	General / flag officers		Senior officers			Junior officers

== Other ranks ==
The rank insignia of non-commissioned officers and enlisted personnel.

Rank group	Senior NCOs			Junior NCOs		Enlisted
National Army of Uruguay						No insignia
National Army of Uruguay	Suboficial mayor	Sargento de primera	Sargento	Cabo de primera	Cabo de segunda	Soldado de primera	Aprendiz
National Navy of Uruguay						No insignia
National Navy of Uruguay	Sub-oficial de cargo	Sub-oficial de primera	Sub-oficial de segunda	Cabo de primera	Cabo de segunda	Marinero de primera	Aprendiz
Uruguayan Air Force						No insignia
Uruguayan Air Force	Suboficial mayor/ Supervisor aerotécnica	Sargento de primera/ Instructor aerotécnico	Sargento/ Aerotécnico principal	Cabo de primera/ Aerotécnico de primera	Cabo de segunda/ Aerotécnico de segunda	Soldado de primera/ Aerotécnico de tercera	Aprendiz
Rank group	Senior NCOs			Junior NCOs		Enlisted

== Historical ranks ==
Commissioned officers

Rank group	General / flag officers		Senior officers			Junior officers
National Army of Uruguay (circa 1992)
National Army of Uruguay (circa 1992)	Teniente general	General	Coronel	Teniente coronel	Mayor	Capitán	Teniente primero	Teniente segundo	Alférez
National Navy of Uruguay (circa 1992)
National Navy of Uruguay (circa 1992)	Vice-almirante	Contraalmirante	Capitán de navío	Capitán de fragata	Capitán de corbeta	Teniente de navío	Alférez de navio	Alférez de fragata	Guardiamarina
Uruguayan Air Force (circa 1992)
Uruguayan Air Force (circa 1992)	Brigadier general	Brigadier	Coronel	Teniente coronel	Mayor	Capitán	Teniente primero	Teniente segundo	Alférez

Other ranks

Rank group	Senior NCOs			Junior NCOs		Enlisted
National Army of Uruguay (circa 1992)						No insignia
National Army of Uruguay (circa 1992)	Suboficial mayor	Sargento de primera	Sargento	Cabo de primera	Cabo de segunda	Soldado de primera	Soldado de segunda	Soldado
National Navy of Uruguay (circa 1992)						No insignia
National Navy of Uruguay (circa 1992)	Sub-oficial de cargo	Sub-oficial de primera	Sub-oficial de segunda	Cabo de primera	Cabo de segunda	Marinero de primera	Marinero de segunda	Aprendiz
Uruguayan Air Force (circa 1992)						No insignia
Uruguayan Air Force (circa 1992)	Suboficial mayor	Sargento de primera	Sargento	Cabo de primera	Cabo de segunda	Soldado de primera	Soldado de segunda
