= Gustavo Fajardo =

Chief of the Defence Staff of Uruguay
- In office 1 January 2021 – 11 March 2022
- President: Luis Lacalle Pou
- Preceded by: Marcelo Montaner
- Succeeded by: Rodolfo Pereyra Martínez

Personal details
- Born: Gustavo Nelson Fajardo Bustamante; August 22, 1962 (age 64) Aiguá, Uruguay
- Education: Escuela Militar de Uruguay

Military service
- Allegiance: Uruguay
- Branch/service: National Army of Uruguay
- Years of service: 1982 —present
- Rank: General

Gustavo Nelson Fajardo Bustamante (born 22 August 1962) is a Uruguayan Army General who served as Chief of the Defence Staff of the Uruguayan Armed Forces from 2021 to 2022.

Born on August 22, 1962, in Aiguá, Maldonado Department, he is the brother of Arturo Fajardo, a Roman Catholic cleric and current bishop of Salto. Graduated from the Military School as Alférez of the Cavalry in 1982, he has served as Commander of the 4th. Army Division, and as Director of the Military Institute of Weapons and Specialties (IMAE).

== Career ==
During his career as an Army Officer, he served in the No. 8, No. 5 and No. 9 Cavalry Regiments, the position of "Commander of Tank Squadron and Mechanized Reconnaissance Squadron"; while in the No. 7 and No. 8 Cavalry Regiments, he served as "Section Commander". He was Second Chief of the "Patria" Armored Cavalry Regiment No. 8, Chief of the Aceguá Detachment and Operations and Instruction Officer of the Regiment, and Commander of the No. 3 Cavalry Brigade.

In 2002 he served as a military observer in the United Nations mission in the Democratic Republic of the Congo, and in 2012 in the Ivory Coast. From 2015 to 2016 he served as Director of the Military Institute of Weapons and Specialties (IMAE). A year later he presided over a Special Honor Court that tried José Nino Gavazzo. The then President Tabaré Vázquez asked the Senate for approval to promote Fajardo's mandatory retirement. Finally, the proposal was not approved because 3/5 of the votes were needed, that is, 18; however, only 16 were registered in favor.

In 2018 he succeeded General Julio Macías as Commander of the 4th. Army Division, the section that is in charge of the tasks carried out by the land branch of the Armed Forces in the departments of Lavalleja, Rocha, Maldonado, Treinta y Tres and Cerro Largo. He remained in office until 2019, when he was succeeded by Luis E. González.

From March 2 to October 15, 2020, he served as a military attaché, as head of the Armed Forces Mission at the Embassy of the Uruguay in the United States, as well as head of the Uruguayan delegation to the Inter-American Defense Board and as an advisor to the Permanent Representation of Uruguay to the Organization of American States. In November 2020, he took office as Director of the Army Teaching System and General Director of the Military Institute for Higher Studies (IMES), succeeding Ricardo Fernández.

In January 2021, after the mandatory retirement of Marcelo Montaner, he was appointed as Chief of the Defence Staff of Uruguay by President Lacalle Pou. On February 26, 2022, the Ministry of National Defense announced that Fajardo had requested retirement for "personal reasons" and therefore submitted his resignation from the position.

== Personal life ==
He is married to Pilar Varela Baldovinos and has two children: Fabiana and Federico.
