= José R. Bonilla =

Former Uruguayan Air Force Commander-in-Chief

José Bonilla

14th Commander-in-Chief of the Uruguayan Air Force
- In office 2 February 2009 – 20 October 2010
- President: José Mujica
- Preceded by: Enrique Bonelli
- Succeeded by: Washington Martínez

Personal details
- Born: October 27, 1951 Melo, Cerro Largo
- Spouse: Gabriela Rodríguez
- Education: Military School of Aeronautics

Military service
- Allegiance: Uruguay
- Branch/service: Uruguayan Air Force
- Years of service: 1970 – 2010
- Rank: General of the Air
- Commands: Uruguayan Air Force General Command

José Ramón Bonilla Irigoyen (born October 27, 1951) is a retired Uruguayan General of the Air who served as the 14th Commander-in-Chief of the Uruguayan Air Force between February 2009 and October 2010. In 2010, he was appointed to inaugurate the position of Chief of the Defense Staff, and in 2013, as Coordinator of the State Intelligence Services. From there Bonilla established a close relationship with José Mujica, who had been a Tupamaro guerrilla fighter, and to whom Bonilla returned a captured flag of his former organization, which was once an enemy of the Air Force. Mujica, who was moved when receiving the flag, that was inside a wooden and glass receptacle, with an inscription that said: "The Uruguayan Air Force to President Mr. José Mujica.", believes that it was seized by the military during the guerrilla occupation of the city of Pando, on October 8, 1969.

== Early life ==
José Bonilla was born on October 27, 1951, in Melo, Cerro Largo Department, Uruguay. He completed his primary studies at the José Pedro Varela Public School in Maldonado Department and his secondary education at the Maldonado Departmental High School. After completing his studies, he joined the Uruguayan Air Force via the Military School of Aeronautics on March 20, 1970, graduating as Alférez (Ensign) and Piloto Aviador Militar (Military Aviator Pilot) on December 21, 1973.

== Military career ==
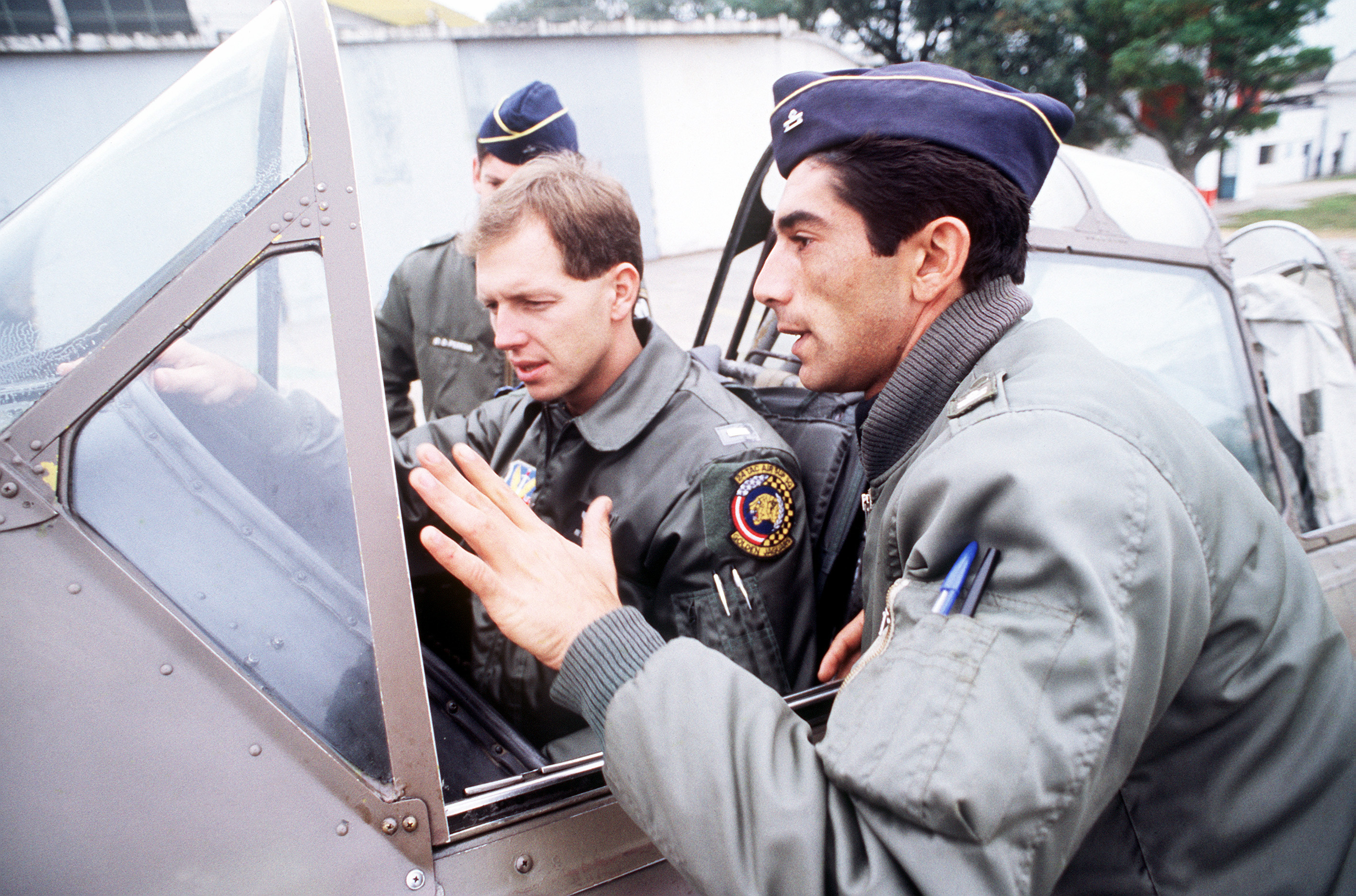
Uruguayan Air Force Lieutenant Manuel Atorro briefs Lieutenant Michael Tutt of the 24th Tactical Air Support Squadron (24th TASS) of the United States Air Force on the North American T-6G Texan aircraft, aircraft that was flown by José Bonilla when he was assigned to Air Brigade II in Santa Bernardina, Durazno, prior to flight.

José Bonilla completed his primary flight training flying Cessna T-41D Mescalero. After his graduation, in 1974 he was sent to Air Brigade II in Santa Bernardina, Durazno Department, where he completed the Uruguayan Air Force Advanced Flight Course, flying North American T-6 Texan. Then, in 1975, he was appointed Acquisitions Officer of that Brigade, while also completing the Instructor Pilot Course, becoming a T-6 flight instructor, assigned to Aviation Group No. 1 (Instruction and Training). He also qualified as Piloto Principal (Principal Pilot) in Cessna U-17A Skywagon and Piper L-21 Super Cub.

In 1978, Bonilla served in the Uruguayan Air Force Maintenance and Supply Brigade and, later, in the Communications and Electronics Brigade in Air Brigade I, at Carrasco International Airport. He was then assigned to the Military School of Aeronautics, serving in the Student Corps. At the same time, he completed the Cessna T-41D Mescalero Flight Instructor Course, and also qualified as a twin-engine pilot in the Beechcraft A-65 Queen Air. Between 1982 and 1984, he was appointed Head of the Primary and Basic Flight Course of the Military School of Aeronautics, entrusted with the selection process and training of the student pilots of the Air Force. Between 1985 and 1987, he served at the Brigada de Seguridad Terrestre (Ground Security Brigade) in Captain Boiso Lanza Military Airfield in Montevideo, as Company Commander of Ground Security Group No. 1. He was also assigned to fly Cessna U-17A Skywagon and Cessna U-19L aircraft of said Brigade, and later was appointed as Head of Accounting and Acquisitions of the same Brigade. After being designated as Head of the Administration Division at the Technical School of Aeronautics of the Uruguayan Air Force, he was promoted to the rank of Major in 1988, graduating from the Uruguayan Air Force Basic Command and Air Staff Course at the Air Command and Staff School, also located in the Captain Boiso Lanza Military Airfield. In 1989, he was again assigned to the Ground Security Brigade, occupying this time the position of Head of Ground Security Group No. 1, and upon promotion to the rank of Lieutenant Colonel in 1992, he completed the Higher Command Course at the Air Command and Staff School.

In 1995 he was appointed Aide-de-Camp to the President of the Republic, President Luis Alberto Lacalle de Herrera, and in 1997, he was promoted to Colonel. In 2002 he assumed the position of Director of the Military School of Aeronautics, and rose to the rank of Brigadier General on February 1, 2004. He also took charge of the Services Air Command, but on April 1, 2005, due to restructuring in the organization of the Uruguayan Air Force Force, this Command was renamed Logistics Air Command. José Bonilla was also designated as Chief of the Joint Chiefs of Staff.

On February 2, 2009, José Bonilla was elected to take charge of the General Command of the Uruguayan Air Force, as Commander-in-Chief. He served as the 14th Commander-in-Chief of the Uruguayan Air Force between February 1, 2009, and October 20, 2010, when he was then .

As an Uruguayan Air Force Pilot, José Bonilla has accumulated approximately 2350 flight hours. He flew 6 different models of aircraft, holding the Uruguayan Air Force Piloto Comandante (Command Pilot) Wings.

== Personal life ==
José Bonilla has stood out as an athlete in soccer, tennis and paddle ball. He is married to Mrs. Gabriela Rodríguez and has four children, Joaquín, Felipe, Rodrigo and Jimena.

== Flight Information ==
Rating: Command Pilot.

Flight Hours: 2350.

Aircraft Flown: T-41D, T-6, U-17A, L-21, A-65, U-19L.
