= Medardo R. Farías =

Uruguayan general (1898–1960)

1st Inspector General of the Uruguayan Air Force
- In office 19 December 1953 – 1 March 1955
- President: Andrés Martínez Trueba
- Preceded by: Position established
- Succeeded by: Hernán S. Barú

Personal details
- Born: 25 June 1898 Florida, Uruguay
- Died: 1 April 1960 (aged 61) Montevideo, Uruguay
- Education: Military School of Uruguay

Military service
- Allegiance: Uruguay
- Branch/service: Uruguayan Army; Aeronáutica Militar; Uruguayan Air Force
- Years of service: 1919–1957
- Rank: General
- Commands: Aeronáutica Militar; General Inspection of the Uruguayan Air Force

Medardo R. Farías (2 June 1898 – 1 April 1960) was a Uruguayan Army general and pioneer of Uruguayan aviation. In 1950 he was one of the drafters of the project that sought to create an independent Air Force in Uruguay, following the example of many other countries in the world that had confirmed the strategic importance of an independent military aviation, based on the lessons learned during the course of World War II. After the realization of the project in 1953, he became the first General Inspector of the independent Fuerza Aérea Militar (Military Air Force), whose position today is equivalent to Commander-in-Chief of the Uruguayan Air Force.

== Early life ==
Farías was born on 25 June 1898, in Florida, capital city of the homonymous department in Uruguay. When he was 17 years old, he joined the Uruguayan Army via the Uruguay Military School, graduating as ensign of the Artillery Weapon in January 1919. Given his interest in aviation, however, in 1921 he entered the Escuela Militar de Aviación (Military School of Aviation), becoming part of the second course of pilots that was given by the school in the country. He received his military wings in 1923.

== Military career ==
Shortly after 1926, due to changes of assignment within the Uruguayan Army, Farías had to return to the Artillery Arm. In the meantime, away from the military aviation, he purchased a Curtiss JN and a Potez 36 with then Lieutenant Oscar Diego Gestido, who would become the 32nd Constitutional President of Uruguay in 1967, and the photographer Juan C. Gambarini.

=== Return to aviation ===
In 1932 Farías was finally able to rejoin the Military Aviation School, as an instructor and squadron pilot. During 1935, when he was holding the rank of major, he became part of the Aeronáutica Militar (Military Aeronautics), a first true military aviation organization of the Uruguayan Army. When he was there, Farías was appointed as Uruguayan Air Attaché to the Kingdom of Italy in 1937, where he had the opportunity to study with the Regia Aeronautica and become the first Uruguayan pilot to visit Eritrea in Africa. This also included a visit to the front lines during the Second Italo-Ethiopian War.

After his return to Uruguay in 1938, he became Chief of Aeronautical Base No. 1 in Carrasco and then became Director of the Escuela Militar de Aeronáutica (Military School of Aeronautics). He also proposed, and achieved, making August 10 the day dedicated in Uruguay to those who had fallen during service in the Uruguayan military aviation.

== Creation of the Uruguayan Air Force ==
With the rank of colonel between 1945 and 1950, he drafted and handed to his superiority a project to create an independent Air Force that was initially known as the Fuerza Aérea Nacional (National Air Force), name that was later changed to Fuerza Aérea Militar (Military Air Force). This project followed the example of many others countries of the world that had already chosen that path. His work as part of the project was carried out prior to his appointment as General Director of the Aeronáutica Militar in 1952, after he reached the rank of general.

Finally, with the approval of Law 12,070 on 27 November 1953, by the General Assembly of Uruguay, on 4 December 1953, the Fuerza Aérea Militar was created as an independent service of the Uruguayan Armed Forces.

General Farías was then designated by the Decree of the Executive Power No. 23,117 of 16 December 1953 to become its first inspector general, which in turn was established as part of the Order No.1 of the General Inspection of the Air Force, dated December 19, 1953, when his appointment finally took place.

=== Retirement from the Air Force ===
The Air Force was under his command until 1 March 1955, when he was succeeded by General Hernán S. Barú, whose links with Uruguayan aviation goes back to 1923. Immediately after his retirement from the Air Force, Farías then went on to serve in the Ministry of National Defense until March 14, 1957, when he went into full retirement by law, after 38 years of service.

He died on 1 April 1960, at the age of 61.

== Namesakes ==
In his honour, the promotion of the Escuela Militar de Aeronáutica of 1962 was named "Gral. Medardo R. Farías". The "Salón de Conferencias "Gral. Medardo R. Farías"" conference room in the General Command of the Uruguayan Air Force is also named in his honor, where the promotion ceremonies of new Senior and General Officers of the Uruguayan Air Force normally take place.
