= Manuel E. Buadas =

Uruguayan Air Force Lieutenant General

6th Commander-in-Chief of the Uruguayan Air Force
- In office 1 February 1982 – 13 October 1985
- President: Gregorio Álvarez
- Preceded by: José Darío Cardozo
- Succeeded by: Fernando J. Arbe
- President: Julio María Sanguinetti

Personal details
- Born: October 13, 1925 Florida, Uruguay
- Died: December 16, 2002
- Spouse: Lía Verónica Tachini Conti
- Education: Military School of Aeronautics

Military service
- Allegiance: Uruguayan Air Force
- Branch/service: Uruguayan Army; Aeronáutica Militar; Uruguayan Air Force
- Years of service: 1941–1985
- Rank: Lieutenant General
- Commands: Uruguayan Air Force General Command

Manuel E. Buadas (October 13, 1925 – December 16, 2002) was a Uruguayan Lieutenant general who served as the sixth Commander-in-Chief of the Uruguayan Air Force between February 1982 and October 1985. He was the last Uruguayan Air Force Commander appointed by the Uruguayan General Officers Junta during the civic-military dictatorship of Uruguay of 1973. He continued to serve as the Uruguayan Air Force Commander-in-Chief under the democratically elected government of Julio Maria Sanguinetti since March 1, 1985, until 13 October 1985, succeeded by Lieutenant General Fernando J. Arbe.

== Early life ==
Buadas studied primary and secondary education in Sarandí Grande, Florida. Upon completing his studies, he entered the Military School of Aeronautics of the Uruguayan Army in March 1941, graduating as Alférez (Ensign) and receiving the Military Pilot Brevet No. 148 in 1945.

== Military career ==
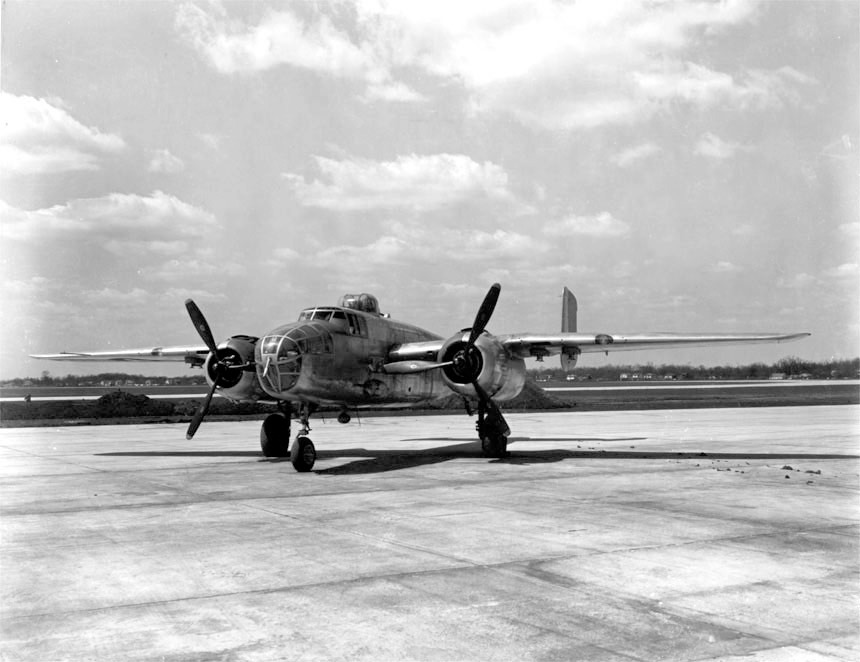
North American B-25J Mitchell of the United States of America, similar to those used by the Uruguayan Aeronáutica Militar and later Uruguayan Air Force, that the then First Lieutenant Manuel E. Buadas flew in 1950.

In 1950 he was promoted to First Lieutenant and was part of the crews that flew 11 recently purchased North American B-25J Mitchell bombers from the United States of America to Uruguay. Buadas flew aboard B-25J-25-NC No. 155 (c/n 108–33998, s/n 44-30723). He later served as Head of the Application Course of Officers. Then, in 1951 and up to 1956 he served in Air Transport Aviation Groups, flying Douglas C-47A Skytrains and carrying out air missions not only across Uruguay but to several countries in South and North America.

He was also an instructor pilot, and provided flight instruction to cadets and Junior Officers in different aircraft of the Uruguayan Air Force inventory. In 1957 and 1958, while at the rank of Mayor, Buadas served as Head of the Corps of Cadets of the Military School of Aeronautics. In 1959 he was appointed Chief of the Aviation Group No. 4 (Transport), still equipped with Douglas C-47A Skytrain aircraft, and was promoted to the rank of Lieutenant Colonel in February 1961. He was then designated Second Chief of the Air Brigade I, based in the Carrasco International Airport.

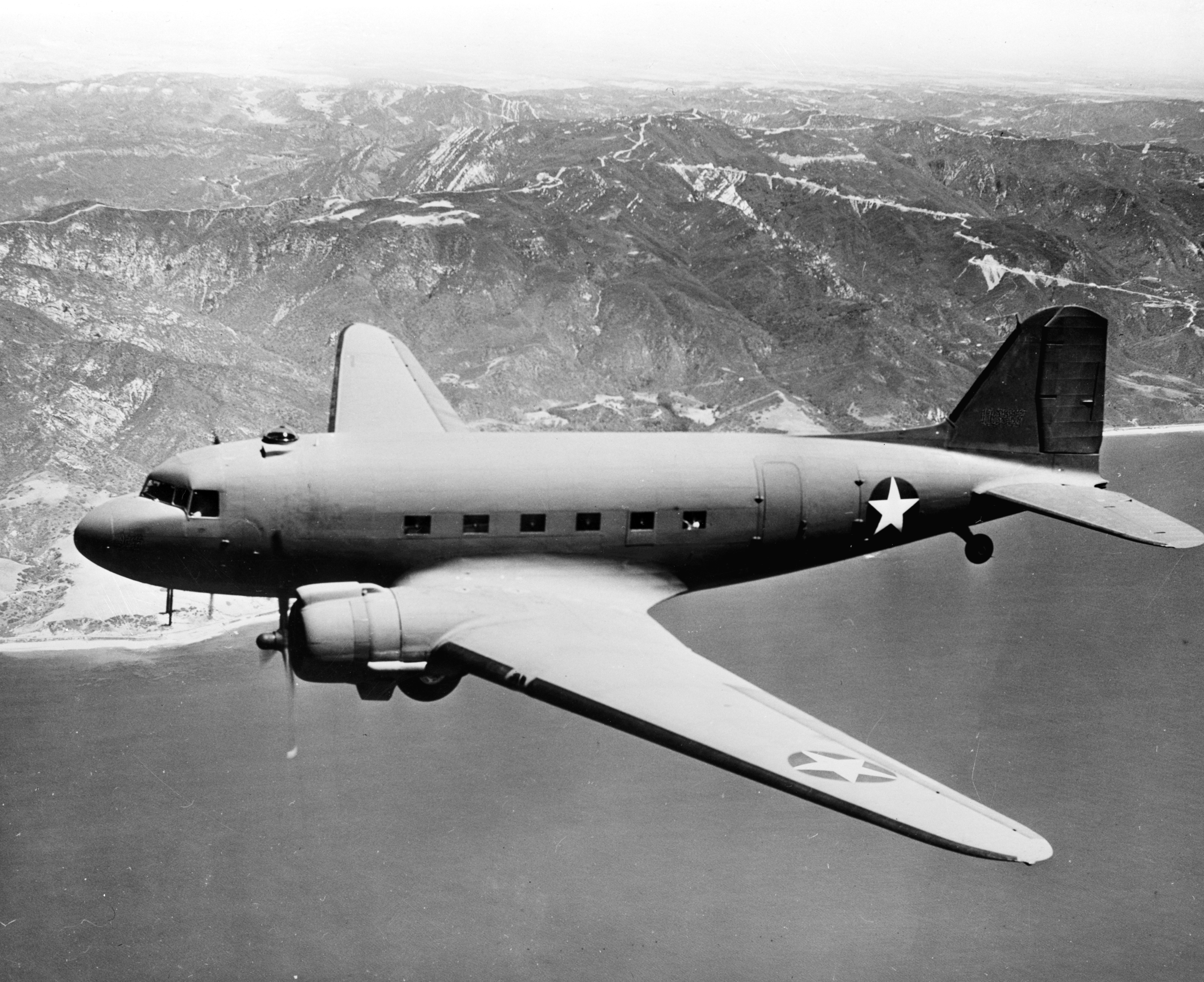
Douglas C-47A Skytrain of the United States Army Air Forces (USAAF) in 1943. Similar aircraft were used by the Aviation Group No. 4 (Transport) of the Aeronáutica Militar and later the Uruguayan Air Force, and of which Manuel E. Buadas was a pilot and flight instructor.

In 1963 he was awarded a scholarship to take part in Command and General Staff Courses, and also attended an Academic Instructor Course at the United States Air Force Air University. He was promoted to Colonel in February 1964, and appointed Deputy Chief of the General Staff (Operations) of the Air Force. In 1966 he was finally appointed Chief of the Air Brigade I in Carrasco, and in 1968 appointed as Air Attaché at the Embassy of Uruguay, Washington, D.C. Upon his return from the United States in 1970, he was appointed as Deputy Chief of the General Staff (Logistics) of the Air Force, serving in turn as Professor at the School of Command and Air Staff of the Uruguayan Air Force. In 1972 he was appointed Director of the Secretariat of the Uruguayan Air Force General Command, position he held until April 12, 1973, when he was appointed General Director of the flag carrier of Uruguay, PLUNA. Buadas was promoted to Brigadier General on 1 February 1978, serving as Head of the General Staff of the Air Force and as Director at the National Directorate of Civil Aviation and Aeronautical Infrastructure, while also integrating the Superior Court of Promotions and Resources of the Air Force, and also the Superior Court of Honor of the Uruguayan Air Force. He also served at the Political Affairs Commission (COMASPO) of the Armed Forces until October 1981.

On October 5, 1981, he was elected by the Air Force General Officers Board to take charge of the General Command of the Uruguayan Air Force, as Commander-in-Chief, with the rank of Lieutenant General. He served as the sixth Commander-in-Chief of the Uruguayan Air Force between February 1, 1982, and October 13, 1985.

As an Uruguayan Air Force Officer and Piloto Aviador Militar (P.A.M.) (Military Aviator Pilot), Manuel E. Buadas achieved the rating of Piloto Comandante (Command Pilot) and specialized in bomber and cargo aircraft. He was a founder member of the Club Fuerza Aérea (Air Force Club) and also a recipient of the military pilot wings of the Chilean Air Force, Argentine Air Force, Peruvian Air Force, Bolivian Air Force, Guatemalan Air Force, Ecuadorian Air Force and the Mexican Air Force. He also received Decorations from the Governments of Brazil, the United States of America and Guatemala.

Manuel E. Buadas died on December 16, 2002, and was cremated.

== Flight Information ==
Rating: Command Pilot

Aircraft Flown: PT-19, SNC-1, T-6D, AT-11, B-25J, C-47A.
