= Defence Staff (Uruguay) =

Defence Staff of Uruguay
- Estado Mayor de la Defensa
- Active: 2010–present
- Country: Uruguay
- Branch: Armed Forces of Uruguay
- Type: Military staff
- Role: Advice to the Ministry of National Defense on planning and coordination of the joint actions of the three branches of the Armed Forces
- Garrison/HQ: Montevideo

Commanders
- Current Chief: General of the Air Rodolfo Pereyra Martínez

The Defence Staff (Spanish: Estado Mayor de la Defensa, ESMADE) is an advisory body of the Ministry of National Defense of Uruguay on issues related to the planning and coordination of activities carried out by the Armed Forces. Created from Law 18,650 of February 19, 2010, its current headquarters was inaugurated in 2011, and is located on Avenida Luis Alberto de Herrera at its intersection with Monte Caseros St.

== Functions ==
The powers of the Defense Staff are included in Article 16 of Law No. 18,650, and in Article 6 of Law No. 19,775.

- Doctrinal development and planning of joint operations of the Armed Forces.
- Analysis and assessment of strategic scenarios.
- Logistics planning of the Armed Forces at the ministerial level, particularly with regard to weapons systems, communications, equipment and new technologies.
- Advise on the planning of the design of the Forces.
- Advise, at the request of the Minister of National Defense, on the joint training of military personnel, from the Officer Training Schools.
- Receive, analyze and raise the reports of the Defense Attachés of the Republic accredited to foreign governments.

== Chief of the Defense Staff ==
The position of Chief of the Defense Staff (Spanish: Jefe del Estado Mayor de la Defensa) is regulated by article 16 of Law No. 18,650. The holder is designated among the General Officers or active Admirals, and has the same hierarchy as the Commanders-in-Chief of the different branches, therefore, at the time of designation, it is granted the rank of Army General, Admiral or General of the Air, depending on whether it belongs to the Army, Navy or Air Force respectively. Likewise, no type of rotation is established between each branch of the Armed Forces, since the designation is given by confidence of the Executive.

The holder of the position may remain in activity for up to five years counted from the promotion, having as an exception the cessation as Commander-in-Chief due to appointment as Chief of the General Staff. In the event of being dismissed from his position, the chief of the defense staff must go into mandatory retirement.

No.	Name (born–died)	Term of office			Defence branch	Ref.
No.	Name (born–died)	Took office	Left office	Time in office	Defence branch	Ref.
1	General of the air José Ramón Bonilla	20 October 2010	18 June 2011	241 days	Uruguayan Air Force	
2	Army general Daniel Castellá	1 February 2012	1 February 2014	2 years, 0 days	National Army of Uruguay	
3	Army general Milton Ituarte	1 February 2014	2 February 2015	1 year, 1 day	National Army of Uruguay	
4	Army general Nelson Pintos	2 February 2015	1 February 2017	1 year, 365 days	National Army of Uruguay	
5	Army general Juan José Saavedra	1 February 2017	1 February 2019	2 years, 0 days	National Army of Uruguay	
6	Army general Alfredo Erramún	1 February 2019	1 April 2019	59 days	National Army of Uruguay	
7	Admiral; Fernando Pérez Arana	4 April 2019	3 March 2020	334 days	National Navy of Uruguay	
8	Army general Marcelo Montaner	4 March 2020	1 February 2021	334 days	National Army of Uruguay	
9	Army general Gustavo Fajardo	1 February 2021	11 March 2022	1 year, 38 days	National Army of Uruguay	
10	General of the air Rodolfo Pereyra Martínez	7 April 2022	Incumbent	4 years, 132 days	Uruguayan Air Force	
