= Uruguayan presidential aircraft =

The President of Uruguay no longer uses an exclusive presidential aircraft. Instead, he flies in Air Force aircraft.

== Current aircraft ==
The President of Uruguay, currently uses an Embraer EMB 120 Brasilia, operated by the Uruguayan Air Force for flights within South America.

== 1965–1981 ==
Between 1965 and 1981, the presidential aircraft was a C-47 Dakota (Uruguayan Air Force 507).

== 1981–1988 ==
In 1981, president Gregorio Alvarez bought a Learjet 35, which was sold by president Julio Maria Sanguinetti in 1988.

== 2006 Presidential aircraft controversy ==
On July 6, 2006, president Vazquez announced he was interested in acquiring a presidential aircraft to make his trips cheaper. He even mentioned the possibility of selling one or more old Air Force planes and use the money to afford the new one. However, this announcement led to a scandal with people arguing that the first center-left president in a third world country couldn't make such a frivolous waste of money.

== See also ==
- Air transports of heads of state
- Uruguayan Air Force
- Pluna
- Russian presidential aircraft - Official aircraft of the President of Russia
