= Cockade of Uruguay =

National Cockade of Uruguay

Artigas's Cockade, military cockade of Uruguay

The National Cockade of Uruguay was first adopted by law on December 22, 1828. It features the colours of the national flag, blue and white.

== Civilian and military usage ==
=== Civilian ===
The National cockade is used mainly by civilians. The period of civilian-military administration in Uruguay from 1973 to 1985 made a strict distinction between civilian and military usage somewhat fluid at times.

=== Military ===
The Military of Uruguay uses the Artigas's Cockade. This design is blue-white-blue with a red diagonal stripe.

== Police usage ==
Meanwhile, the police uses a red-white-blue cockade design which is based on the Flag of the Treinta y Tres.

== See also ==
- Flag of Uruguay
- Artigas flag
- Flag of the Treinta y Tres
