= Cap. Juan Manuel Boiso Lanza Air Base =

- IATA: none; ICAO: SUBL

Summary
- Airport type: Military
- Location: Montevideo Department, Uruguay
- Elevation AMSL: 131 ft / 40 m
- Coordinates: 34°48′40″S 56°09′50″W

Map
- Location of airport in Uruguay

Runways
Direction	Length		Surface
Direction	m	ft	Surface
06/24	850	2,789	Grass
- Source: OurAirports

Cap. Juan Manuel Boiso Lanza Air Base (Spanish: Base Aérea Cap. Juan Manuel Boiso Lanza) (ICAO: SUBL) is an air base of the Uruguayan Air Force located in the Montevideo Department of Uruguay. Air Brigade III, which includes the Nº7 Squadron (Observation & Liaison) is stationed on the field. The Air Force Command and Staff College (Spanish: la Escuela de Comando y Estado Mayor Aéreo) is also on the base.

The air base is considered the birthplace of the Uruguayan Air Force because the first airplanes such as the T-6 Texan and the Curtiss Falcon were assembled in the base workshops. The first helicopter squadron was also formed at the base before the unit was transferred to Carrasco.

The streets bordering the base are Avenue de las instrucciones, Av. General San Martin, and Av. Pedro de Mendoza. A railway line forms the south border of the base.

The air base has a grass runway but does not currently have a control tower. Air operations are very limited.

== See also ==
- Transport in Uruguay
- List of airports in Uruguay
