= Armed Forces of Uruguay =

Combined military forces of Uruguay

- Fuerzas armadas del Uruguay (Spanish)
- Coat of Arms of Uruguay
- Founded: 1828
- Service branches: National Army of Uruguay; National Navy of Uruguay; Uruguayan Air Force
- Headquarters: Montevideo, Uruguay

Leadership
- President of the Republic: Yamandú Orsi
- Minister of National Defense: Sandra Lazo
- Chief of the Defence Staff: Rodolfo Pereyra Martínez

Personnel
- Active personnel: 24,000 (2001)

Expenditure
- Budget: $492 million (2008)
- Percent of GDP: 2.3% (2020)

Industry
- Foreign suppliers: Argentina; Austria; Brazil; Belgium; Canada; Czech Republic; France; Germany; Japan; Italy; Israel; Russia; Singapore; South Africa; Switzerland; United States

Related articles
- Ranks: Ranks of the Armed Forces of Uruguay

The Armed Forces of Uruguay (Spanish: Fuerzas Armadas del Uruguay or FF.AA. del Uruguay) consist of the National Army of Uruguay, the National Navy of Uruguay, and the Uruguayan Air Force. These three independent branches are constitutionally subordinate to the President of the Republic through the Minister of Defense. The government has trimmed the armed forces to about 16,800 for the Army; 6,000 for the Navy; and 3,000 for the Air Force. As of 2026 Uruguay has approximately 900 to 1,000 personnel active in various global conflict zones. Their soldiers are currently serving in 5 or 6 active United Nations Peacekeeping missions at a given time. Including but not limited too the United Nations Organization Stabilization Mission in the Democratic Republic of the Congo *MONUSCO*, the United Nations Disengagement Observer Force *UNDOF* in the Golan Heights, and the United Nations Military Observers in India and Pakistan *UNMOGIP*. The overwhelming majority of the Uruguayan peacekeepers (between 700 to 900 personnel) are stationed in the Democratic Republic of the Congo.

== Army (Ejército Nacional) ==
The Army consists of some 15,000 personnel organized into four divisions.

It is equipped with 15 Israeli Ti-67 (T-55) Main Battle Tanks (MBTs), 17 American M24 Chaffee light tanks, 46 M41A1 Walker Bulldog light tanks, 24 American M113A1 Armored Personnel Carriers (APCs), 15 Czech BMP-1 Infantry Fighting Vehicles (IFVs), 130 OT-64 SKOT APCs, 64 German Condor APCs, 15 Brazilian EE-9 Cascavel, 18 EE-3 Jararaca armored cars, and 48 Russian lightly armored GAZ-3937 amphibious vehicles. In 2008, Uruguay also purchased 44 6x6 Canadian-made AVGP APCs rehabilitated by FAMAE in Chile after retirement from the Canadian Army, receiving a second batch of 100 of Grizzlys and 5 Huskys, the recovery version. It has 4 sets of RM-70 multiple rocket launchers. The army operates 40 Land Rover Defender 110SW vehicles, and is looking to buy between 30 and 40 more.

The current assault rifle used by the Army is the Argentinian-built version of the Belgian FN FAL; it is being replaced by the Austrian Steyr AUG following a bidding contest in 2007 and 2008. In addition, about 300 Russian AK-101s are already used, and the elite airborne, commando, and antiterrorist Battalion 14 (Batallón de Infantería Paracaidista N.º 14) exclusively employ German Heckler & Koch G36s.

The Army will receive locally produced Glock 17 pistols as replacements for its legacy Browning Hi-Power and M1911 pistols.

Uruguay Special Forces are now fielding an indigenous .50 BMG sniper rifle called the FS50 Peregrino. It is a single-shot bolt-action rifle that was developed in Uruguay for about two years.

The Uruguayan Army was considering buying either the Panzerfaust 3 or RPG-7 as short-range anti-tank weapons. Acquisition of the rockets was cancelled due to lack of funds.

== Navy (Armada Nacional) ==
The Navy consists of about 5,700 personnel under command of Admiral Jorge Wilson and is organized into four commands: the Fleet Command (Comando de la Flota or COMFLO), the Coast Guard (Prefectura Nacional Naval or PRENA), the Chief Directorate of Naval Materiel (Dirección General de Material Naval or DIMAT), and the Chief Directorate of Naval Personnel (Dirección General de Personal Naval or DIPER). The Navy General Staff (Estado Mayor General de la Armada or ESMAY) acts as an advisory body to the admiral.

The current fleet consists of one ex-German Lüneburg-class replenishment ship, refitted with helipad and used for helicopter patrol and transport and named ROU 04 General Artigas, one former United States Coast Guard (USCG) Cape-class cutter, named ROU 11 Río Negro, three former USCG Marine Protector-class patrol boat, named as ROU 14 Río Arapey, ROU 15 Río de la Plata and ROU 16 Río Yaguaron, three ex-East German Kondor II class minesweepers, a three-masted staysail schooner named Capitán Miranda (ROU 20) and other smaller craft.

The Navy also includes Marine Corps and a small Naval Air Station at Laguna del Sauce, equipped with two Beechcraft T-34C-1 Turbo Mentors, two Beechcraft Super King Air and three Cessna O-2A Skymasters fixed-wing aircraft, and two Bell 412 and one Bell OH-58A Kiowa helicopters.

The Uruguayan Naval Academy (Escuela Naval or ESNAL) is located in Carrasco, a suburb of Montevideo. Instruction consists of a 4-year course of study culminating in a cruise on the instructional tall ship Capitán Miranda, which lasts several weeks and takes graduates to various ports around the world.

== Air Force (Fuerza Aérea Uruguaya) ==
The Air Force consists of about 3,000 personnel and organized into three Air Brigades (I, II, & III) and several Squadrons.

Combat aircraft consist of a few Cessna A-37B Dragonflies and transport aircraft of two Lockheed C-130s, two Embraer C-95 Bandeirantes, one Embraer C-120ER Brasilia, five Spanish CASA C-212-200/300 Aviocars and ten Cessna U-206H Stationairs. The helicopter fleet consist of a few Bell UH-1H Iroquois, five Bell 212 and two Eurocopter AS-365N2 Dauphin.

The Air Force Academy (Escuela Militar de Aeronáutica) is located at General Artigas Air Base in Pando, Canelones; the Air Force Technical School of Aeronautics (Escuela Técnica de Aeronáutica) in Toledo Sur, Canelones; and the Air Force Command Academy (Escuela de Comando y Estado Mayor Aéreo) at Captain Boiso Lanza Air Base in Montevideo. Training aircraft consists of twelve Italian Aermacchi SF-260EU, three Beechcraft UB-55 and UB-58 Barons, and five Swiss Pilatus PC-7U Turbo Trainers.

== See also ==
- Cockade of Uruguay
