= List of airports by ICAO code: S =

Due to the size of this list, it has been split into nine lists:

- List of airports by ICAO code: SA-SC
- List of airports by ICAO code: SD-SH
- List of airports by ICAO code: SI
- List of airports by ICAO code: SJ
- List of airports by ICAO code: SK-SM
- List of airports by ICAO code: SN-SP
- List of airports by ICAO code: SQ
- List of airports by ICAO code: SS-SU
- List of airports by ICAO code: SV-SY
