= Castaibert II =

General information
- National origin: Argentina
- Designer: Pablo Castaibert
- Number built: 1

History
- First flight: 1910

The Castaibert II was Pablo Castaibert's second aircraft, powered by a 25 hp (19 kW) Anzani 24.5hp 3-cyl fan engine and reached 46.5 miles per hour (75 km/h). After building a Demoisselle style monoplane, which was unsuccessful, Castaibert built a Bleriot style monoplane which was successfully flown.

== Specifications (Castaibert II) ==
Data from

General characteristics

- Length: 8.15 m (26 ft 9 in)
- Wingspan: 8.8 m (28 ft 10 in)
- Wing area: 19.138 m^{2} (206.00 sq ft)
- Gross weight: 320 kg (705 lb)
- Powerplant: 1 × Anzani 3-cylinder air-cooled fan engine, 19 kW (25 hp)

Performance

- Maximum speed: 75 km/h (47 mph, 40 kn)
