= Castaibert III =

General information
- Type: monoplane
- National origin: Argentina
- Manufacturer: Castaibert

History
- First flight: 1912

The Castaibert III was the 3rd, but 2nd successful attempt at flying by Pablo Castaibert. This occurred in 1912, and was described in Boletin del Ae C. Argentino.

== Specifications ==
Data from

General characteristics

- Length: 8.47 m (27 ft 9 in)
- Wingspan: 9.35 m (30 ft 8 in)
- Wing area: 18.0232 m^{2} (194.000 sq ft)
- Gross weight: 280 kg (617 lb)
- Powerplant: 1 × Anzani radial engine, 19 kW (25 hp)

Performance

- Maximum speed: 75 km/h (47 mph, 40 kn)

== Military operators ==
Argentina

- Argentinian Air Force
