= IMPA Tu-Sa =

Tu-Sa
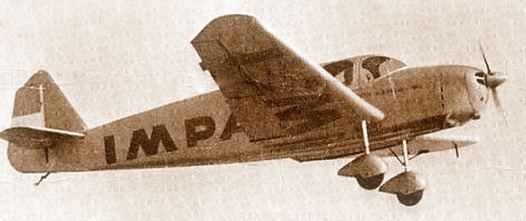

General information
- Type: Civil trainer
- National origin: Argentina
- Manufacturer: IMPA
- Number built: ca. 25

History
- First flight: 17 April 1943

The IMPA Tu-Sa, (IMPA - Industrias Metalúrgicas y Plasticas Argentinas S.A.), named as Impa Tu-Sa-O in the Flight reference, was a civil trainer developed in Argentina in the 1940s for aeroclub use. It was a conventional, low-wing monoplane with wide-track fixed tailwheel undercarriage. In service, the aircraft demonstrated a number of serious and fundamental design flaws that led to a series of accidents and pilots joking that Tu-Sa stood for Todo Un Sarcófago Aéreo ("Altogether an aerial coffin"). When it became apparent that the defects could not be corrected without a complete redesign of the aircraft, they were withdrawn from use.

== See also ==
- Turbay T-1 Tucán
