= Uruguayan Air Force =

Air warfare branch of Uruguay's military

- Fuerza Aérea Uruguaya
- Badge of the Uruguayan Air Force
- Founded: 4 December 1953; (72 years, 10 months); (as independent service); 17 March 1913; (113 years, 7 months); (as Escuela Militar de Aviación)
- Country: Uruguay
- Type: Air Force
- Role: Aerial Warfare
- Size: 2,850 servicemen 60 aircraft
- Part of: Uruguayan Armed Forces
- Headquarters: Cap. Juan Manuel Boiso Lanza Air Base
- Mottos: La aviación, vanguardia de la Patria; "Aviation, vanguard of the Homeland"
- March: Uruguayan Air Force March
- Anniversaries: 17 March (Air Force Day); 10 August (Day of the Martyrs of Military Aviation)
- Engagements: Failed Revolution of 1935 (As Aeronáutica Militar); Revolución Libertadora (F-51Ds Combat Air Patrols against Uruguayan airspace violations by Argentina); Taking of Pando (Anti guerrilla-warfare against Tupamaros); 1973 Uruguayan coup d'état
- Website: www.fau.mil.uy

Commanders
- Supreme Commander: President of Uruguay
- Commander-in-Chief of the Air Force: Air Force General Fernando Colina Alsinet
- Commander of Air Command Operations: Brigadier General José M. Medina
- Commander of Air Command Staff: Brigadier General Juan José Méndez Quintana
- Chief of General Staff: Brigadier General Fernando Colina
- Commander of Air Logistics Command: Brigadier General Gaetano Battagliese
- National Director of Civil Aviation and Aviation: Brigadier General Leonardo Blengini

Insignia
- Flag

- Roundel

- Fin Flash

Aircraft flown
- Attack: A-29
- Helicopter: AS365, Bell 212, UH-1H
- Patrol: C-212
- Reconnaissance: C-212, U-206H
- Trainer: SF-260EU, PC-7U, L-13
- Transport: C-95, C-120ER, C-212, C-310L, KC-130H, A65, UB-55, UB-58, PA-18
- Tanker: KC-130H

The Uruguayan Air Force (Spanish: Fuerza Aérea Uruguaya, abbreviated FAU) is the air service branch of the Armed Forces of Uruguay. Originally created as part of the National Army of Uruguay, the Air Force was established as a separate branch on December 4, 1953. It is the youngest and also the smallest branch of the Armed Forces of Uruguay. In 1977 it was determined that the mission of the Air Force is to conduct strategic and tactical aerospace operations on behalf of the national defense, exercising the sovereignty of the Uruguayan airspace and defending the independence, integrity, constitution and laws of the country. The Air Force must also conduct search and rescue missions and plan, propose, execute and supervise the necessary measures for the development of the aerospace potential, while providing any necessary and possible logistical support during the natural disasters that the country may suffer. Since 1985 this has been always carried out under the command of the President of Uruguay, and according to the Minister of National Defense.

== History ==
=== Antecedents ===
Military aviation in Uruguay was born on 17 March 1913 when the Military Aviation School (Escuela Militar de Aviación) was formed. Like other Latin American countries, flight instruction was initially performed by a European instructor pilot. In Uruguay, this was made by the French instructor Marcel Paillette, who trained ten National Army officers who had been chosen to be the first Uruguayan military pilots. Among them were Captain Juan Manuel Boiso Lanza and Lieutenant Cesáreo L. Berisso. Berisso was one of the first graduates from that school, and on 22 June 1913, he carried out the first solo flight by a Uruguayan, flying from Los Cerrillos to Malvín in 1 hour 45 minutes. He then became the first director of the military aviation flight school and continued his military career until reaching the rank of General. He died on July 28, 1971, and became the namesake of Gen. Cesáreo L. Berisso Air Base in Carrasco, the headquarters of Air Brigade I. Boiso Lanza, however, was the first fatality of the Uruguayan military aviation. He died in a plane crash on 10 August 1918, when he was training in France, and later became the namesake of Cap. Juan Manuel Boiso Lanza Air Base, where the General Command of the Uruguayan Air Force is located in Montevideo. In his honor, August 10 was also made the military aviation martyrs day.

Along with two other young Army officers, Adhemar Saenz Lacueva and Esteban Cristi, the school that was formed was the only military aviation facility in Uruguay until 1935, and used several European aircraft types in fairly large numbers before American aircraft became the most predominant ones. During the twenties, and among them, were sixteen Avro 504K, thirteen Breguet 14, five Castaibert 913-IV and twenty-eight Nieuport 27. These pioneering years saw many air routes opened and an overall increase in the awareness of the aviation with military potential.

=== Aeronáutica Militar ===
In 1935 the Military Aeronautics (Aeronáutica Militar) was established and transformed the military aviation of Uruguay into a more professional weapon of the National Army. New units and airbases were created, and also new and more modern aircraft types were introduced into service. Among the aircraft used during this period were de Havilland DH.82 Tiger Moth and IMAM Ro.37.

At the beginning of 1935, the Uruguayan Army suppressed an armed movement against Gabriel Terra government by members of different political factions. Military operations such as the Battle of Paso de Morlan and the bombardment of revolutionary positions with Tiger Moth aircraft meant the first combat use of military aviation in Uruguay. Then, during 1942 Curtiss SNC-1 Falcon and North American T-6 Texan training aircraft began their service in Uruguay, as did the Beechcraft AT-11 Kansan and Douglas C-47 Skytrain in 1947. Between 1949 and 1950 a total number of 39 aircraft were acquired, including 25 North American F-51D-20-NA Mustang, 11 North American B-25J-25-NC Mitchell and 3 Douglas C-47A Skytrain. With the help of the United States via the Military Assistance Program (MAP), these aircraft allowed the military aviation of Uruguay to grow not only in size but in training.

=== Creation of the Uruguayan Air Force ===
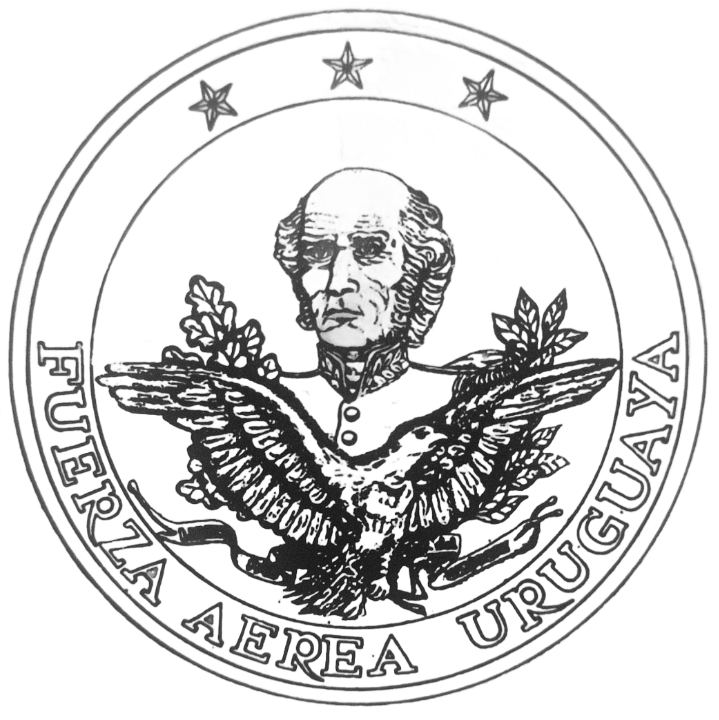
The figure of the Prócer de Uruguay, José Gervasio Artigas on a stamp of the Uruguayan Air Force.

On December 4, 1950, with Law No. 12070, the Military Air Force (Fuerza Aérea Militar) was created as a separate branch of the Armed Forces. All the elements of infrastructure, material, aircraft, personnel and items belonging to the Military Aeronautics were transferred to the new Air Force, as it was established in the first article of the law. The second article of this law established the creation of the General Inspection of the Air Force (Inspección General de la Fuerza Aérea), which under the immediate authority of the Ministry of National Defense, became the direct command of the Military Air Force.

=== Combat patrols during the Revolución Libertadora ===
On June 16, 1955, the Argentine Navy, supported by members of the Army and the Argentine Air Force rebelled against the Government of Juan Perón, in what is known as the Revolución Libertadora. Therefore, the Uruguayan Military Air Force had to change its operational routine according to orders issued by the Executive branch, in order to maintain air surveillance in the event of any violation of Uruguayan sovereignty by Argentine forces. That same day, F-51Ds and B-25Js were fully armed, and around 16:00 local time a first order was given for two F-51s to scramble to Colonia, and a B-25 to the north coast. On September 17, 1955, a section of two F-51 crewed by 1st Lt. Walter Samarello and Lt. 2nd Miguel Lagrotta, who were on a reconnaissance mission, sighted two Argentine warships. These ships appeared in a visual aid that had been delivered to all the pilots of the Aviation Group No. 2, which contained the profiles of the ships of the Argentine fleet. When sighted, the ships fired several bursts of anti-aircraft fire, and Lieutenant Samarello decided to shelter the section among the clouds. The Argentine crew, upon noticing the error and realizing that they were firing at Uruguayan planes, communicated over radio to an Air Force station in Cerrito, Montevideo, a request to not be flown over to avoid confusion, specially after one of these rebel ships had already been attacked by Argentine Air Force pilots loyal to Perón.

=== Jet age ===
In 1956 the Military Air Force was, for the first time, referred to as the Uruguayan Air Force, and thus it could be considered that from this point forward this name began being used. One of the first milestones of the Uruguayan Air Force was also in 1956, when as a result of the Army and later Air Force capability of sustaining a high level of flight training with its F-51D aircraft, flying over 4,000 hours in one year and through the help of the Military Assistance Program, the Aviation Group No. 2 (Fighters) (Grupo de Aviación N.° 2 (Caza)) received its first jet aircraft, four Lockheed T-33A-5-LO that arrived at the Carrasco International Airport on October 23, 1956, beginning the jet age in Uruguay. The flight training that the United States Air Force (USAF) pilots gave in these new jet aircraft was fundamental for the Air Force, and not only veteran but new pilots of the Aviation Group No. 2 were able to transition from flying piston aircraft to jet aircraft on its own, ruling that the Air Force was ready to receive its first single seat jet fighters, Lockheed F-80C-10-LO Shooting Star. These aircraft arrived in 1958 and replaced the North American F-51D-20-NA Mustang in their mission.

In 1959, at the initiative of Brigadier Conrado A. Saez, General Inspector of the Air Force at the time, the Uruguayan Military Air Transport (Transporte Aéreo Militar Uruguayo) was founded to complement the flag carrier First Uruguayan Air Navigation Lines (Primeras Líneas Uruguayas de Navegación Aérea) and provide passenger and cargo services to different cities in the interior of the country and also abroad. TAMU began operating Douglas C-47 Skytrain and would later use Fokker F27 Friendship, Fairchild-Hiller FH-227D, Embraer C-95 Bandeirante and CASA C-212 Aviocar of the Uruguayan Air Force. The service of the C-95 in Uruguay marked the first Embraer export in its entire history, when a total number of five of these brand new aircraft were purchased in 1975.

=== The Air Force and the Uruguayan dictatorship ===
Since the end of the 1960s and the beginning of the 1970s, the Air Force was involved in the fight against the guerrilla activity that was present in the country, focusing against the MLN-T (Movimiento de Liberación Nacional – Tupamaros or Tupamaros – National Liberation Movement), that later triggered a participation in the country's politics.

On February 8, 1973, President Juan María Bordaberry tried to assert his authority over the Armed Forces by returning them to their normal duties and appointing a retired Army general, Antonio Francese, as the new Minister of National Defense. Initially, the Navy of Uruguay supported the appointment but the National Army and Uruguayan Air Force commanders rejected it outright. On February 9 and 10, the Army and Air Force issued public proclamations and demanded his dismissal and changes in the country's political and economic system. Bordaberry then gave up to the pressure, and on February 12, at the Cap. Juan Manuel Boiso Lanza Air Base, Headquarters of the General Command of the Air Force, the National Security Council (Consejo de Seguridad Nacional) was created. The Commander-in-Chief of the Air Force was one of its permanent members, and the Armed Forces of Uruguay from now on were effectively in control of the country, with Bordaberry just participating in a self-coup.

During this period of time, the Uruguayan Air Force took control of the country's airdromes, some aircraft that were seized from the subversion, appointed some of its general officers to led the flag carrier PLUNA and modernized its combat fleet with Cessna A-37B-CE Dragonfly and FMA IA-58A Pucará attack aircraft in 1976 and 1981. The cargo fleet was also renewed, with the purchase of five Embraer C-95 Bandeirante in 1975 and five CASA C-212 Aviocar in 1981. One brand new Gates Learjet 35A was also purchased in 1981, which was one of the only two military transport jet aircraft, being the last one a C-29 that was introduced in 2018, and sold in 2020.

In 1981 two brand new Bell 212 helicopters were also purchased.

The Uruguayan Air Force achieved another milestone, with the first landing of a Uruguayan aircraft in Antarctica, on January 28, 1984, with an Fairchild-Hiller FH-227D.

Since the end of the military government, the Air Force has returned to its normal tasks, and always acting under the command of the President and in agreement with the Minister of National Defense, without having entered the country's politics again, whose participation, in addition, has been forbidden in almost all activities for the Armed Forces.

Between 1992 and 1999 a total number of 36 aircraft were acquired, including the first four-engined and biggest aircraft in Uruguayan Air Force history, three Lockheed C-130B Hercules to carry out long-range strategic missions and six Pilatus PC-7U Turbo Trainers for advanced training in 1992, replacing the aging fleet of Beechcraft T-34 Mentors that were in service since 1977. Two Beechcraft Baron 58 and ten Cessna U-206H Stationair were purchased in 1998, with Uruguay becoming the first operator of the H variant of the Cessna 206, using them for transport, training and surveillance. Two Eurocopter AS365N2 Dauphin for search and rescue and VIP transport missions were also purchased during 1998, followed by 13 Aermacchi T-260EU in 1999, a new basic trainer for the Military School of Aeronautics (Escuela Militar de Aeronáutica) in Pando, Canelones. On April 27, 1994, through Decree No. 177/994 of the Executive Power, a new structure was approved, and the Tactical Regiments and Aviation Groups disappeared to become Air Squadrons, leading to the actual organization of the Air Force.

== Present state of the Air Force ==
While the long-range strategic cargo fleet of Lockheed C-130B Hercules was replaced with two Lockheed KC-130H Hercules, that also became the first aerial refueling capable aircraft of the Uruguayan Air Force in 2020, from the 1990s onwards, various attempts have been made to renew the combat aircraft to no avail, with the T-33A being withdrawn from service in 1996 and the Air Squadron No. 2 (Fighters) suffering two fatal accidents on January 31, 2004 and August 12, 2016, with A-37B aircraft. The obsolescence of the aircraft with which the unit is currently equipped has left the Uruguayan Air Force out of step with the technological advances that aerial warfare was acquiring through the experiences of conflicts during the late 20th century and during the 21st century, which, however, has not prevented the squadron and the Air Force itself from successfully participating in joint exercises between various Air Forces in the region, such as CRUZEX in Brazil or SALITRE in Chile.

In May 2013 eighteen refurbished Sukhoi Su-30 MkI were offered by the Russian Federation and Sukhoi in remarkably favorable conditions that included credit facilities and an agreement branch for maintenance. These conditions were also offered for the Yak-130 Mitten. By December 2013 Uruguayan personnel had test flown this plane in Russia. According to Scramble a number of A-37B Dragonfly were purchased from the Ecuadorian Air Force in January 2014. Also, the Uruguayan and Swiss governments discussed a possible agreement for the purchase of ten Swiss Air Force Northrop F-5 plus engines, spare parts and training, but no actual progress was made.

The Uruguayan Air Force also used to show interest on the IA-58D Pucará Delta modernization program offered by Fábrica Argentina de Aviones, but more recently, among some of the possible aircraft that the Air Force was considering, there are the Hongdu JL-10 or the Alenia Aermacchi M-346 Master, but despite how necessary its renewal is, no purchases has been made.

In July 2026, the Uruguayan Air Force initiated a near-$100 million procurement of six Embraer A-29 Super Tucano turboprop aircraft to replace its aging fleet, including retired Argentine IA-58 Pucarás and legacy American A-37 Dragonflies, representing the nation's largest military aviation investment in decades. According to defense analyst Andrei Serbin Pont, Montevideo deliberately bypassed regional trends toward supersonic fighters, instead prioritizing a pragmatic, budget-conscious defense strategy tailored strictly toward essential operational requirements such as airspace sovereignty, border patrol, close air support and advanced pilot training.

== Aerodromes and air bases ==
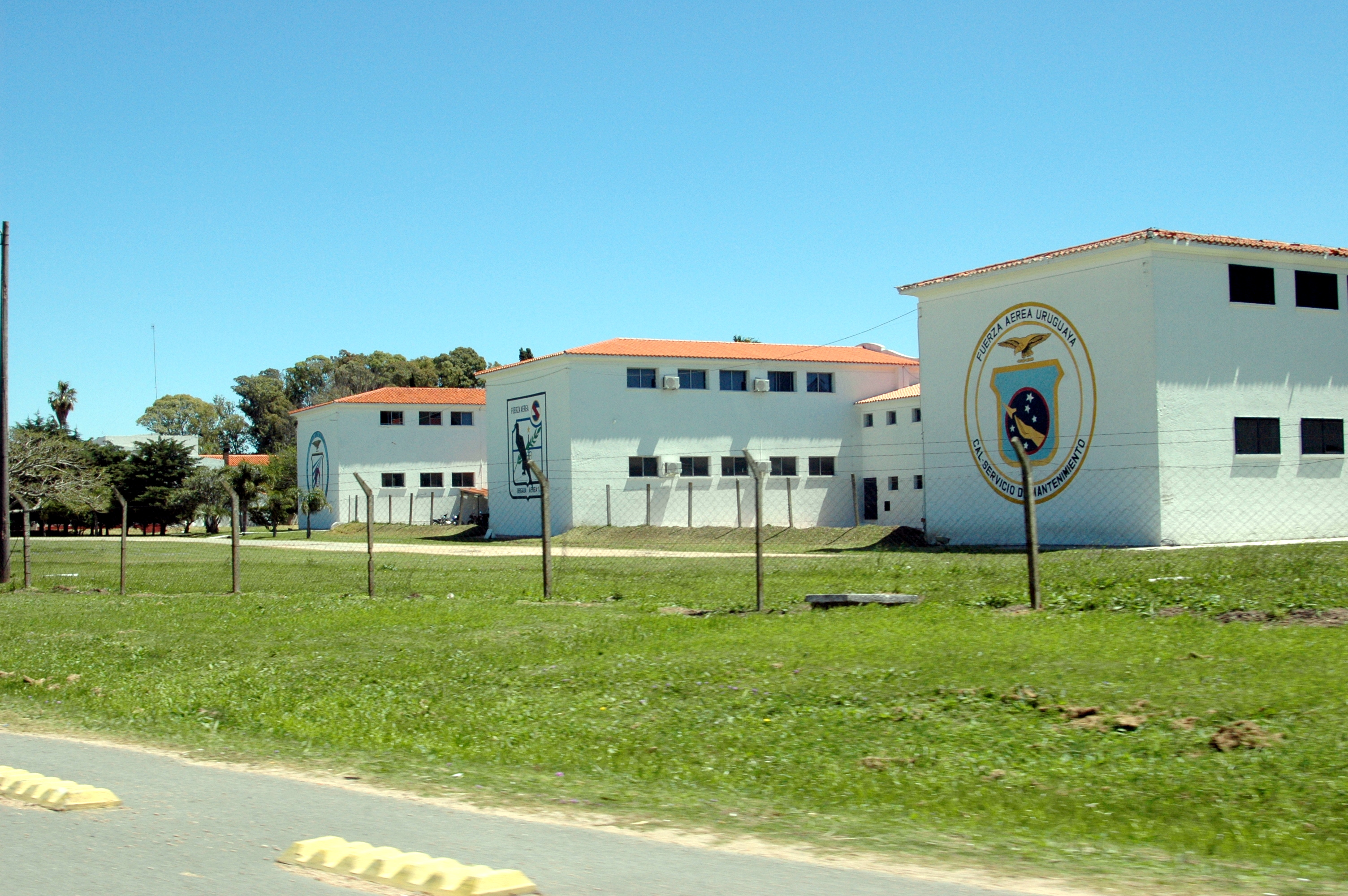
- I Air Brigade, Canelones.
  SUDU - Tte. 2nd Mario W. Parallada, Santa Bernardina, Durazno
- SUMU - Air Brigade I, Carrasco International Airport "Gral. Cesáreo L. Berisso"
- SUBL - Cap. Juan Manuel Boiso Lanza
- SUGA - General Air Base Artigas
- SUCL - La Calera
- SUCR - La Carolina
- SULP - La Paloma

== Organization ==
Today the FAU comprises about 3000 personnel organized into three brigades and various support groups.

Air Brigade I was founded as Nº1 Aeronautics on 1 April 1936. It originally consisted of eight Potez XXV biplanes. Today, the brigade includes the Central Office for Assistance and the Carrasco Central Coordinator for Rescue. It also includes

Nº3 Squadron (Transport) and
Nº5 Squadron (Helicopters).

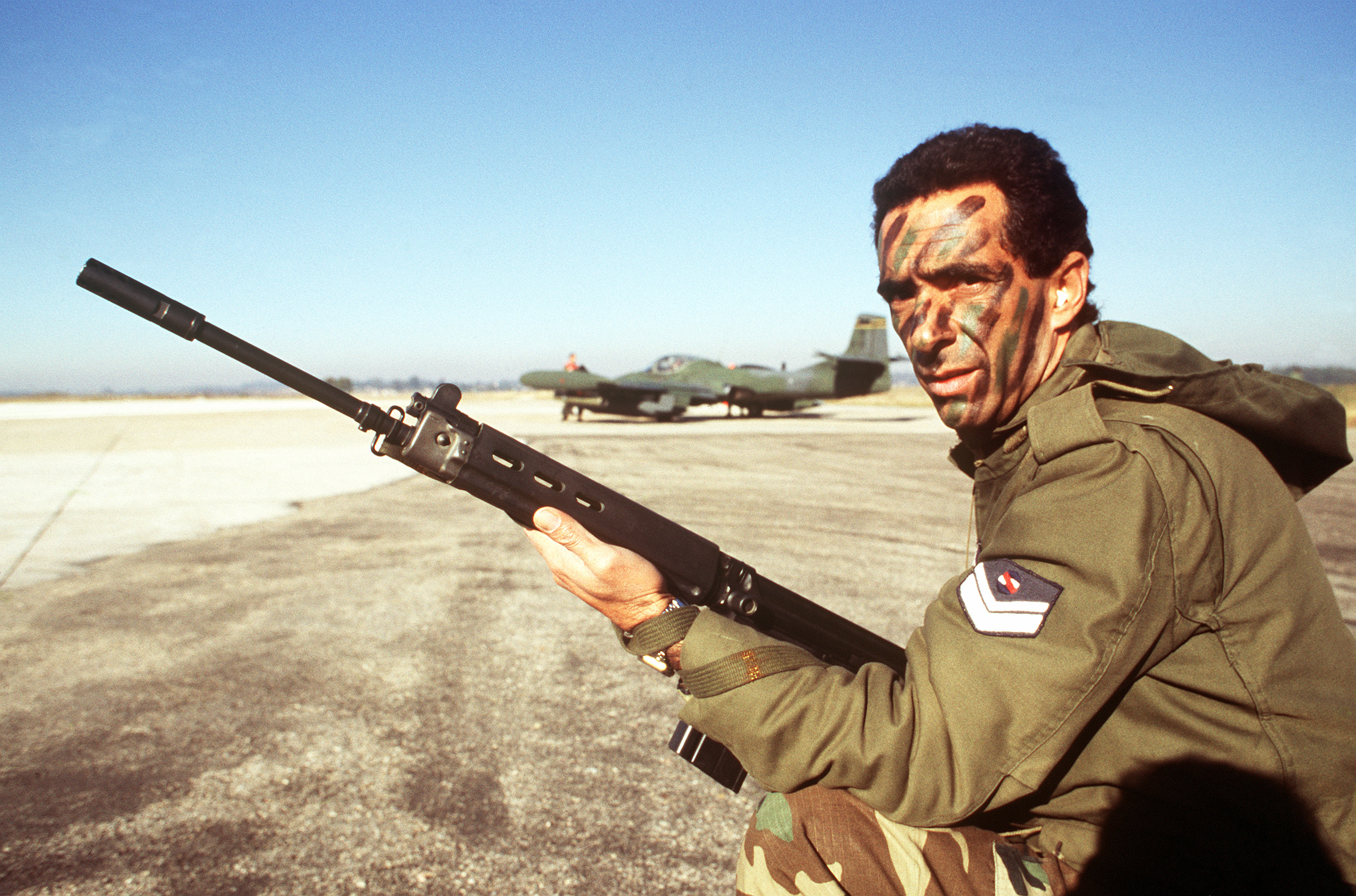
A Uruguayan tactical air controller, keeps watch over a USAF OA-37 during a training exercise

Air Brigade II includes

Nº1 Squadron (Attack),
Nº2 Squadron (Fighters),
the Advanced Flight Squadron, and
the Liaison Squadron.

Air Brigade III includes

Nº7 Squadron (Observation & Liaison).

The Uruguayan Air Force also includes Service divisions for Logistics, Communications and Computer Science, Information, Infrastructure, Maintenance, Meteorology, Health, Remote Aerospace Sensors, and Transport. The FAU is involved in search and rescue, disaster assistance, and transportation to remote locations within the country.

The Uruguayan Air Force currently has five bases. Air Brigade I is based at Gen. Cesáreo L. Berisso Air Base at Carrasco International Airport (SUMU) near Carrasco; Air Brigade II is based at 2nd Lt. Mario W. Parrallada Air Base at Santa Bernardina International Airport (SUDU) in Durazno; Air Brigade III, the high command, and the Command School (Escuela de Comando y Estado Mayor Aéreo) are based at Capitán Boiso Lanza Air Base (SUBL) in Montevideo; Air Squadron 7 is based at Ángel S. Adami Airport (SUAA), also in Montevideo; and the EMA is based at Gen. Artigas Air Base (SUAG) in Pando.

The Aeronautics Technical School (Escuela Técnica de Aeronáutica) is located in Toledo Sur in the Department of Canelones.

=== List of inspector generals and commanders-in-chief ===
Inspectors Generals
No.	Inspector General of the Uruguayan Air Force	Took office	Left office
1	Medardo Farías	1953	1955
2	Hernán Barú	1955	1957
3	Gualberto Trelles	1957	1959
4	Conrado Sáez	1959	1966
5	Remo Laporta	1966	1967
6	Danilo Sena	1967	1969
Commanders-in-Chief
No.	Commander-in-Chief of the Uruguayan Air Force	Took office	Left office
1	Danilo Sena	1970	1970
2	José Pérez Caldas	1970	1974
3	Dante Paladini	1974	1978
4	Rául Bendahan	1978	1981
5	José D. Cardozo	1981	1982
6	Manuel E. Buadas	1982	1985
7	Fernando Arbe	1985	1990
8	Julio Loureiro	1990	1990
9	Carlos P. Pache	1990	1994
10	Raúl Sampedro	1994	1995
11	Miguel A. Suñol	1995	1999
12	José Pedro Malaquín	1999	2004
13	Enrique Bonelli	2004	2009
14	José R. Bonilla	2009	2010
15	Washington Martínez	2010	2015
16	Alberto Zanelli	2015	2019
17	Hugo Marenco	2019	2020
18	Luis Heber de León	2020	Present

== Aircraft ==
=== Current inventory ===
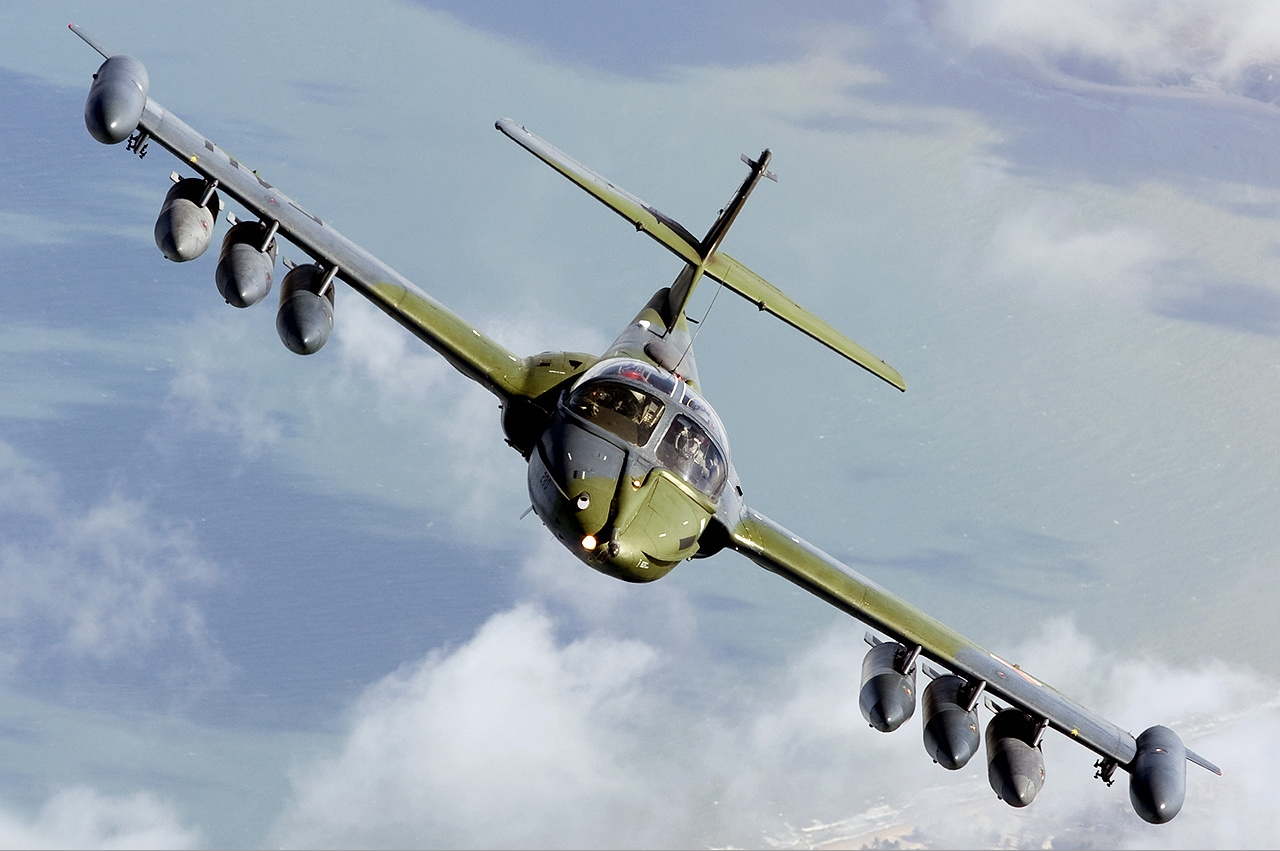
An Uruguayan A-37 in flight

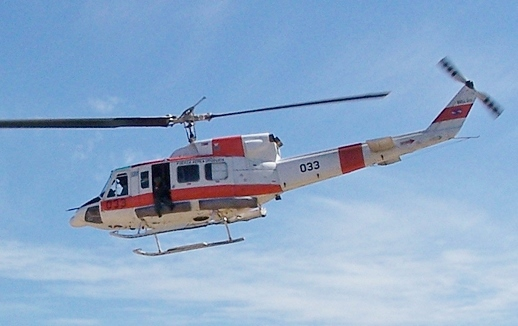
A Bell 212 flies over head

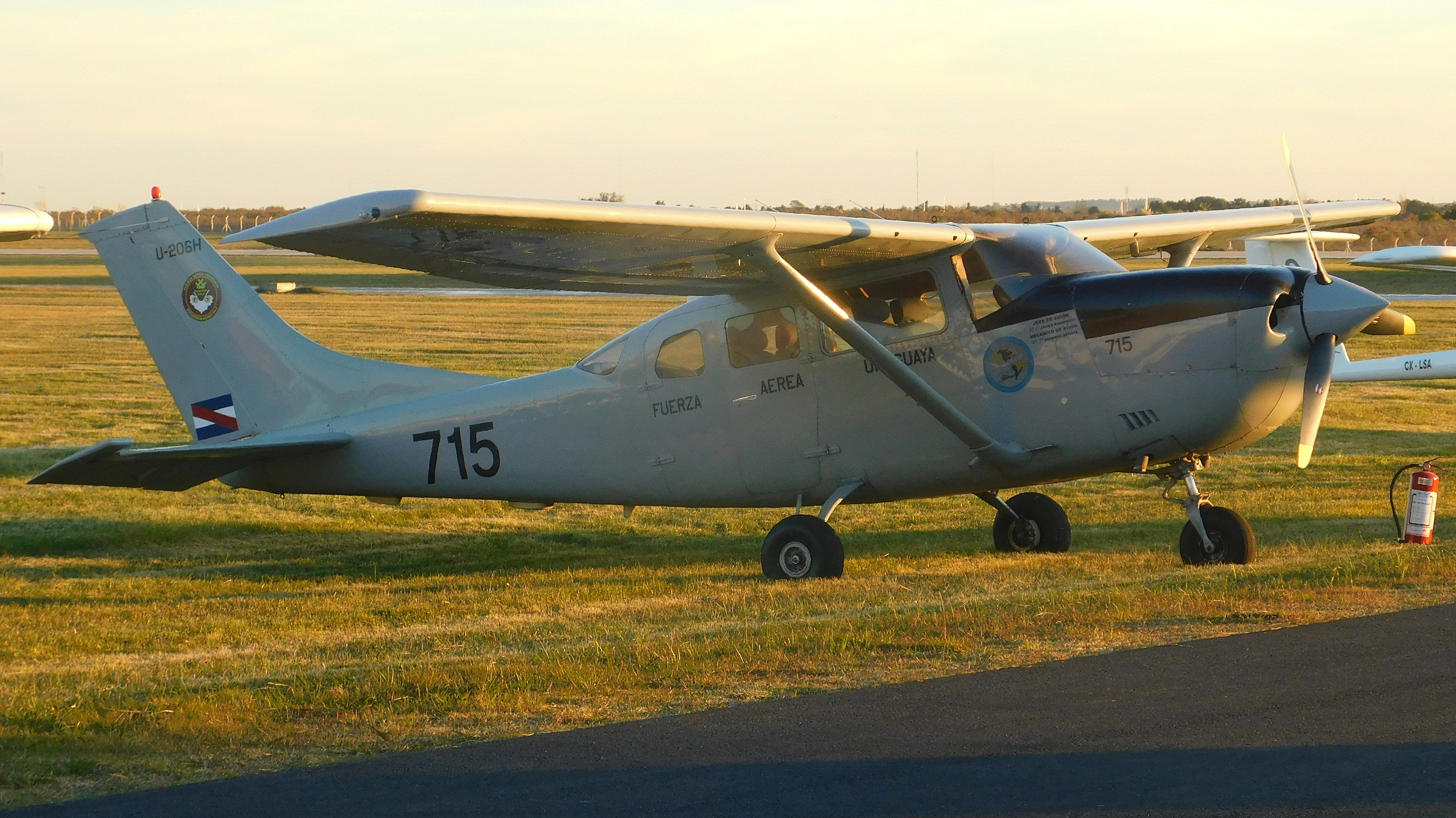
Uruguayan Air Force Cessna U-206H Stationair

Aircraft	Origin	Type	Variant	In service	Notes
Combat aircraft
A-29 Super Tucano	Brazil	Attack		2	4 more on order
Transport
KC-130 Hercules	United States	Transport	KC-130H	2	Formerly operated by Spain
CASA C-212	Spain	Transport	200 / 300	5	Four provide maritime patrol
Beechcraft Baron	United States	Utility	55 / 58	1 / 2	
Cessna 206	United States	Light transport	U-206H	6	
Embraer EMB 120	Brazil	Utility / VIP		2	Presidential aircraft
Embraer EMB 110	Brazil	Transport / Utility		1	Remains in storage awaiting major overhaul
Helicopters
Bell 212	United States	Utility		5	
Bell UH-1	United States	Utility	UH-1H	3	
Eurocopter AS365	France	SAR / Utility		2	Also used for presidential transport
Bell 206	United States	Training		3	
Trainer aircraft
Pilatus PC-7	Switzerland	Trainer		5	
SIAI-Marchetti SF.260	Italy	Trainer		6	

== Rank structure ==
=== Commissioned officer ranks ===
The rank insignia of commissioned officers.

Rank group	General / flag officers		Senior officers			Junior officers
Uruguayan Air Force
Uruguayan Air Force	General del Aire	Brigadier general	Coronel	Teniente coronel	Mayor	Capitán	Teniente primero	Teniente segundo	Alférez

=== Other ranks ===
The rank insignia of non-commissioned officers and enlisted personnel.

Rank group	Senior NCOs			Junior NCOs		Enlisted
Uruguayan Air Force						No insignia
Uruguayan Air Force	Suboficial mayor/ Supervisor aerotécnica	Sargento de primera/ Instructor aerotécnico	Sargento/ Aerotécnico principal	Cabo de primera/ Aerotécnico de primera	Cabo de segunda/ Aerotécnico de segunda	Soldado de primera/ Aerotécnico de tercera	Aprendiz

== Accidents and incidents ==
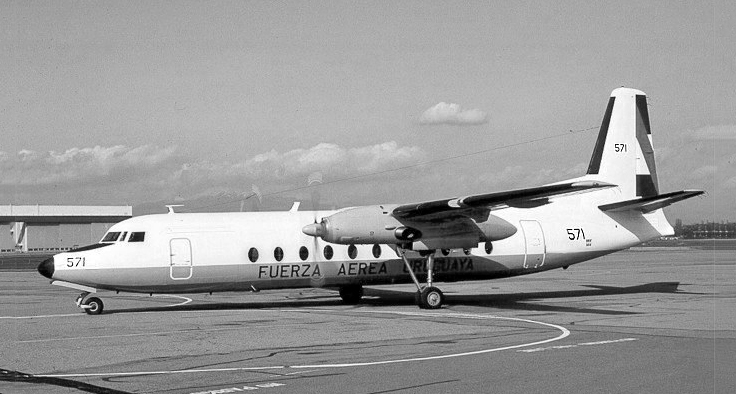
FAU 571 (FH-227), the aircraft involved in Flight 571

The following is a list of air accidents involving the Uruguayan Air Force.

- On October 13, 1972, the Flight 571 of TAMU an FH-227D, registered as FAU 571, which was carrying a group of rugby players Uruguayans Old Christians, made up of alumni of the school Stella Maris, from Uruguay to Chile, it crashed in the Andes Mountains due to Controlled flight into terrain, ultimately resulting in the deaths of 29 of the 45 people on the plane, including all 5 crew members, leaving only 16 survivors. The survivors were finally rescued on December 23, 1972, after 72 days in the Andes.
- On October 9, 2009, one C-212 Aviocar, registered as A-146 (FAU 531) (which was part of the UN MINUSTAH mission) crashed while conducting a reconnaissance mission in the south of Haiti, after air traffic controllers lost all contact with the aircraft when it was flying over the town of Ganthier. The remains of the Aviocar were located from the air, by another aircraft that was sent after the search and rescue systems were alerted. 11 soldiers died in this accident, six Uruguayans and five Jordanians.
- On August 12, 2016, a Cessna A-37B with registration "FAU 273" was conducting a training mission when it crashed to the ground from 2,700m, both pilots were killed on the spot. The causes of the accident are still unknown.
- On August 16, 2016, a UH-1H "Iroquois" helicopter of the Uruguayan Air Force crashed at the Carrasco airport during a training of self- rotation maneuvers where its two crew members subsequently died. The cause of the accident is under investigation.
- On March 25, 2021, a Uruguayan Air Force helicopter carrying approximately 300 doses of the Pfizer COVID-19 vaccine suffered a mechanical failure and crashed on the eastern department of Rocha. The 3-member crew was hospitalized with non-serious injuries, however all 300 doses of the Pfizer vaccine were destroyed in the crash.

== See also ==
- Armed Forces of Uruguay
- History of Uruguay
- National Navy of Uruguay, which includes a Naval Aviation contingent
- Uruguayan Air Force Flight 571
