= Turbay T-1 Tucán =

T-1 Tucán

General information
- Type: Single-seat light monoplane
- National origin: Argentina
- Manufacturer: Sfreddo & Paolini
- Designer: Alfredo Turbay

History
- First flight: April 1943

The Turbay T-1 Tucán was an Argentine single-engined single-seat light touring monoplane. It was designed by Alfredo Turbay and built by Sociedad Anonima Sfreddo & Paolini. It first flew in April 1943.

== Design ==
The Tucán is a parasol-wing braced monoplane with a fixed cantilever type landing gear, tailwheel and powered by a 65 hp (48 kW) Continental A65 air-cooled piston engine. It had an enclosed cockpit just aft of the wing trailing-edge with a sliding canopy.

== Specifications ==
Data from Jane's Fighting Aircraft of World War II

General characteristics

- Crew: 1
- Length: 5.55 m (18 ft 3 in)
- Wingspan: 7.22 m (23 ft 8 in)
- Height: 1.90 m (6 ft 3 in)
- Wing area: 7.20 m^{2} (77.5 sq ft)
- Airfoil: NACA 23012
- Empty weight: 285 kg (628 lb)
- Gross weight: 400 kg (882 lb) (aerobatic)
- Max takeoff weight: 450 kg (992 lb)
- Powerplant: 1 × Continental A65 air-cooled flat-four engine, 48 kW (65 hp)

Performance

- Maximum speed: 205 km/h (127 mph, 111 kn)
- Cruise speed: 185 km/h (115 mph, 100 kn)
- Range: 1,100 km (680 mi, 590 nmi)
- Endurance: 6 hr
- Service ceiling: 4,200 m (13,800 ft)
- Absolute ceiling:4,700 m (15,400 ft)

== See also ==
Related development

- Tucán T-3

Aircraft of comparable role, configuration, and era

- Braunschweig LF-1 Zaunkönig
