= Military School of Aeronautics (Uruguay) =

Military academy

- Escuela Militar de Aeronáutica
- Type: Military academy
- Established: November 20, 1916; 109 years ago
- Headmaster: Col. Gerardo Tajes
- Location: Pando, Canelones Department, Uruguay; 34.7511°S 55.9658°W
- Campus: Suburban
- Colors: SkyBlue White
- Website: ema.fau.mil.uy

The Military School of Aeronautics is the service academy of the Uruguayan Air Force, responsible for the education and training of cadets as commissioned officers. It is the youngest of Uruguay's three service academies, having graduated its first class in 1918.

== History ==
The Escuela Militar de Aviación (Spanish for 'Military Aviation School') was established by law on 20 November 1916, and in 1917 it began training its first nine cadets. Captain Juan Manuel Boiso Lanza was appointed as the academy's first headmaster. While in office, he was designated to join a military mission to France toward the end of World War I in order to receive training as a combat pilot. He died on 10 August 1918 in an accident while performing his final flight to complete the course, and is regarded as the first martyr of Uruguayan military aviation.

In 1917, the National Army acquired a 37-hectare field on the outskirts of Montevideo, to establish the institution. On 18 February 1918, the first military aviators graduated from the school. The site is the present seat of Cap. Juan Manuel Boiso Lanza Air Base, which also houses the headquarters of the General Command of the Uruguayan Air Force. On 31 December 1935, the Military School of Aviation was replaced, through the national Budget Law, by the Military Aeronautics as the fifth branch of the Army.

In late 1937, the institution was relocated to the Pando Aerodrome, on the outskirts of the city of Pando, in the Department of Canelones. At the time, the airfield was also used by Air France, which suspended its operations there in 1940 following the Nazi occupation of France during World War II. The premises were subsequently designated as Base Aérea General Artigas, and the new facilities were formally inaugurated on 20 November of that year.

On 4 December 1953, through Law No. 12,070, the Uruguayan Air Force was established, incorporating all personnel and assets of the former Military Aeronautics and becoming an independent branch of the Armed Forces, under the authority of the Ministry of National Defense, alongside the National Army and the Navy.

== Academics ==
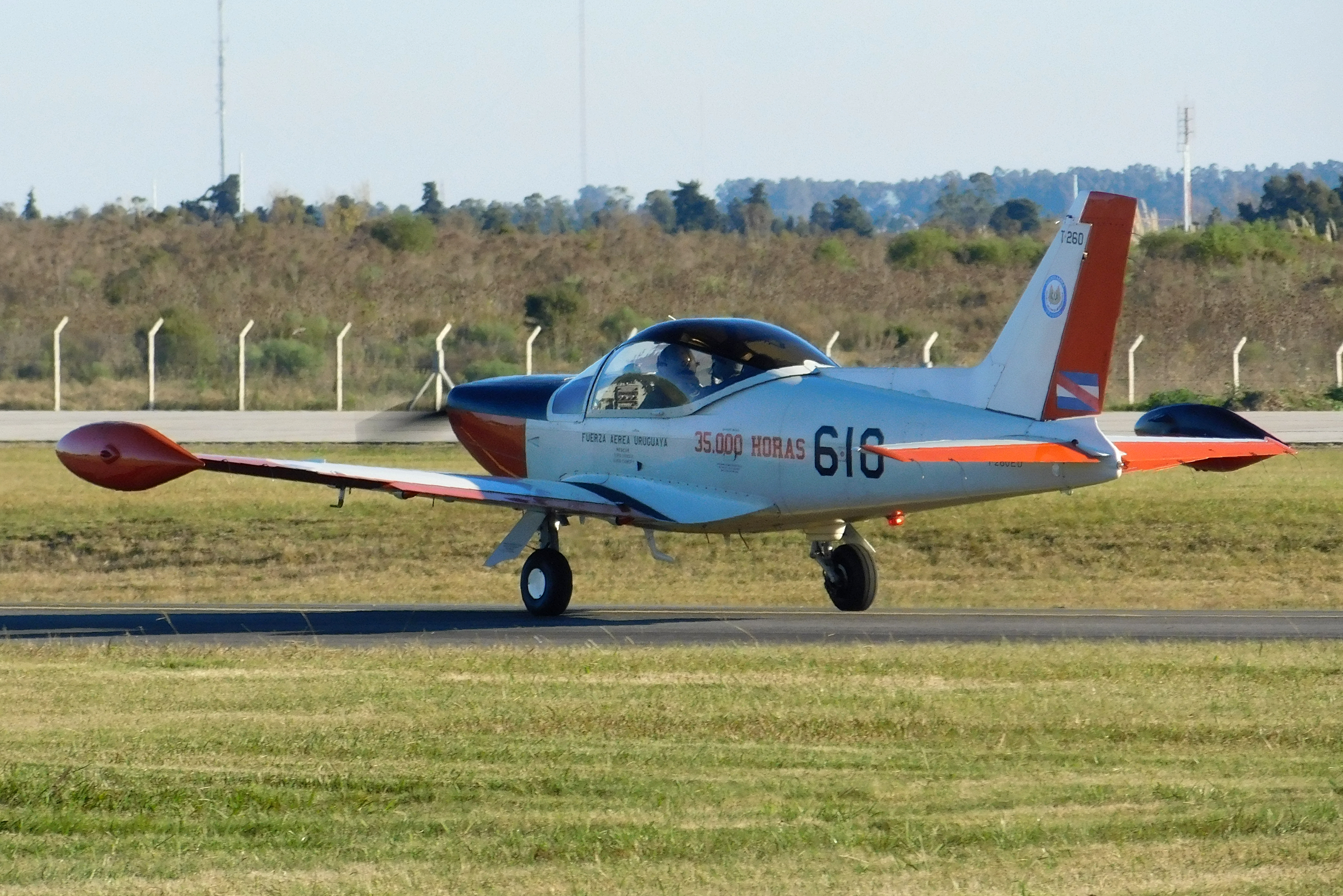
An Aermacchi SF-260EU operated by the Basic Flight Squadron of the Uruguayan Air Force.

The Military School of Aeronautics provides the training of Air Force officers through an accredited four-year tertiary programme. The educational process includes an initial year as an officer candidate, during which students complete a preparatory course focused on military aptitude, physical conditioning, and academic instruction. This is followed by three years as cadets undertaking the professional course, which is structured into three branches: the Air Corps (Senior Officer Track), the Ground Security Corps (Senior Officer Track), and the Technical Corps (Senior Officer Track).

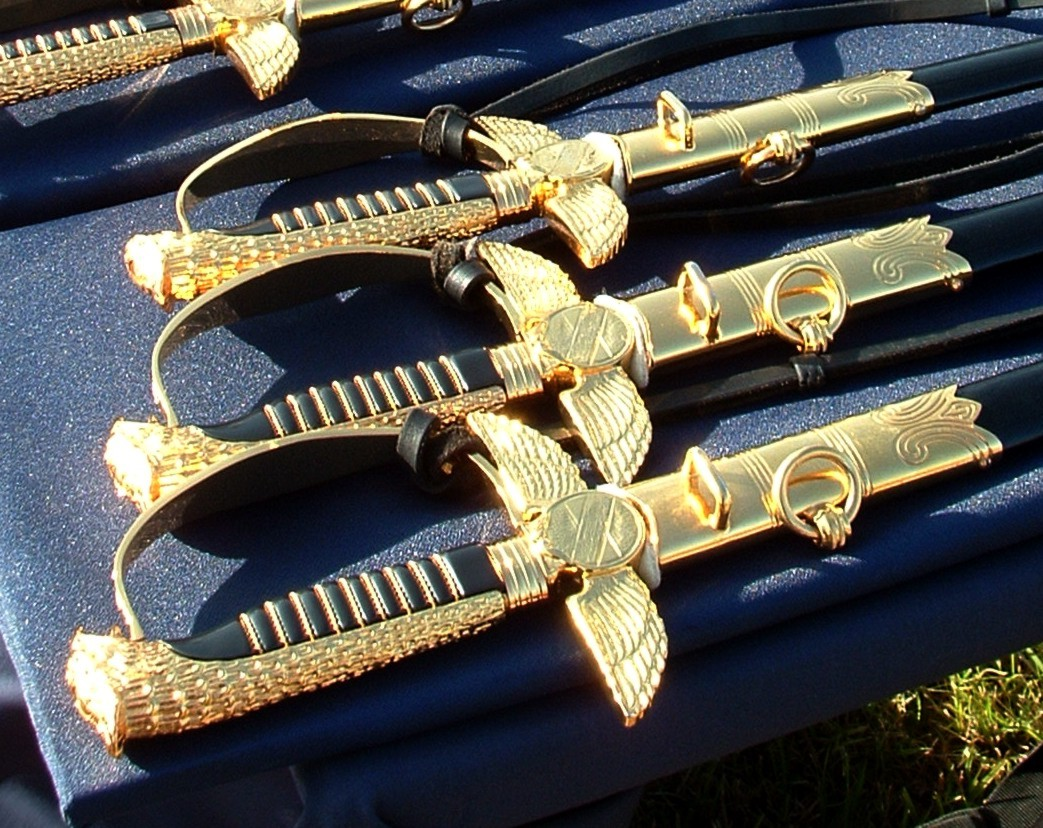
Sword used by officers of the Uruguayan Air Force. It is presented upon graduation as a symbol of command.

From the second year onward, cadets are assigned to the Basic Flight Squadron, where they commence their professional aeronautical training. This phase comprises the Flight Screening Course, the Transition and Aerobatics Course, the Basic Instrument Flight Course, the Formation Flying Course, and the Air Navigation and Night Flying Course.

From 2020 onward, the Ministry of Education and Culture granted official academic recognition to the programme of studies, enabling cadets to graduate not only as commissioned officers but also with the academic degree of Licentiate in Aerospace Military Defence, with specialisations in Aviation, Aeronautical Logistics, or Communications and Electronics.
