= Outline of Italy =

Country in Southern and Central Europe

The flag of Italy

The emblem of Italy

Anthem: "Il Canto degli Italiani"

The location of Italy

The following outline is provided as an overview of and topical guide to Italy:

Italy is a unitary parliamentary republic in South-Central Europe, located primarily upon the Italian Peninsula. It is where Ancient Rome originated as a small agricultural community about the 8th century BC, which spread over the course of centuries into the colossal Roman Empire, encompassing the whole Mediterranean Basin and spreading Roman culture and civilization across the empire. This civilization was so influential that parts of it survive in modern law, administration, philosophy and arts, providing the groundwork that the Western world is based upon.

== General reference ==
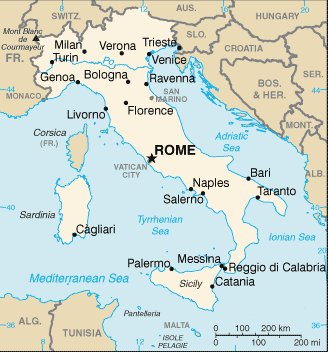
An enlargeable basic map of Italy

- Name of Italy
  - Pronunciation: /ˈɪtəli/
    - Italian: [iˈtaːlja]
  - Common English country name: Italy
  - Official English country name: Italian Republic
  - Common endonym(s): Italia
  - Official endonym(s): Repubblica italiana
  - Adjectival(s): Italian
  - Demonym(s): Italian
- Date and time notation in Italy
- International rankings of Italy
- ISO country codes: IT, ITA, 380
- ISO region codes: See ISO 3166-2:IT
- Internet country code top-level domain: .it

== Geography of Italy ==
Topographic map of Italy

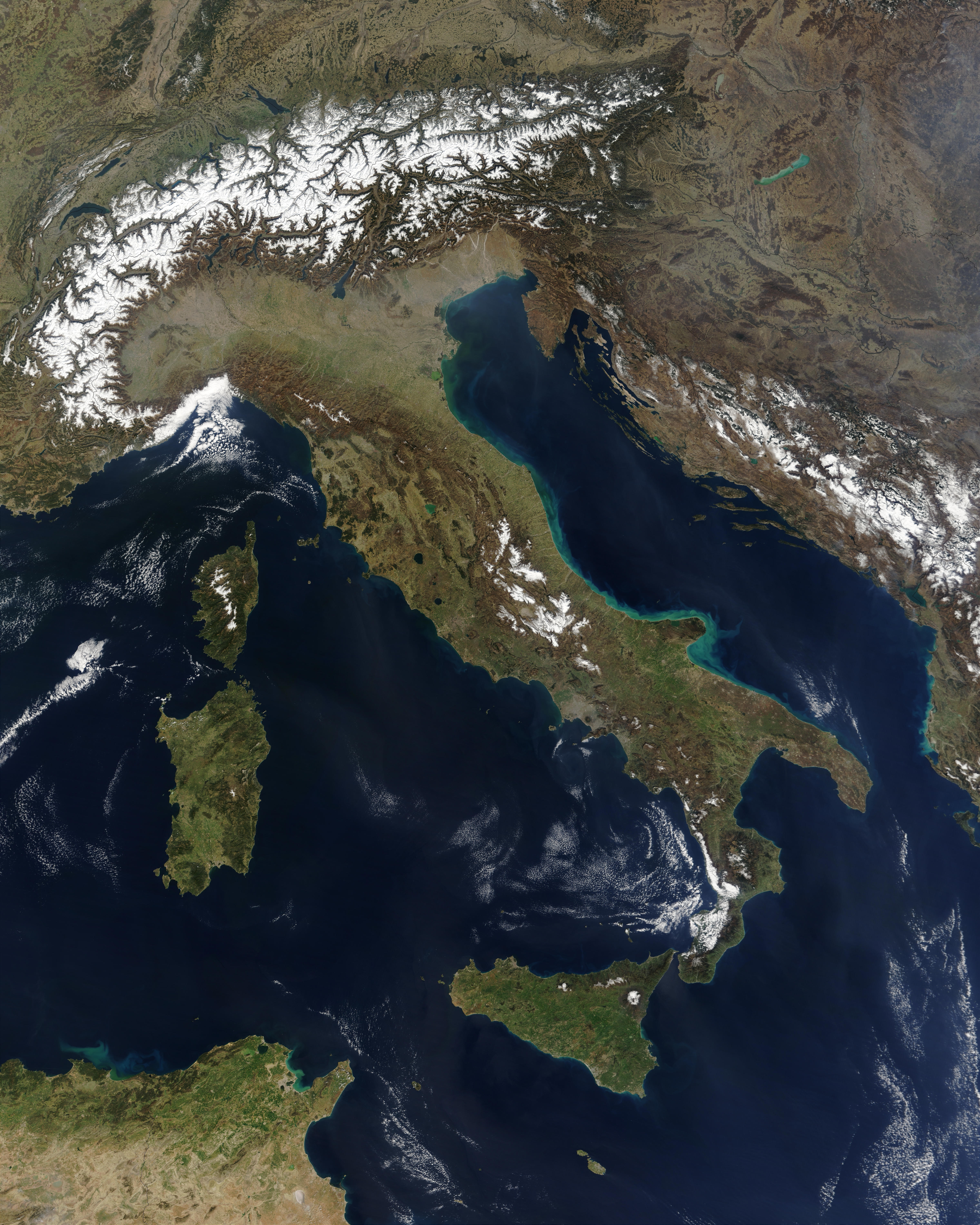
An enlargeable satellite image of Italy

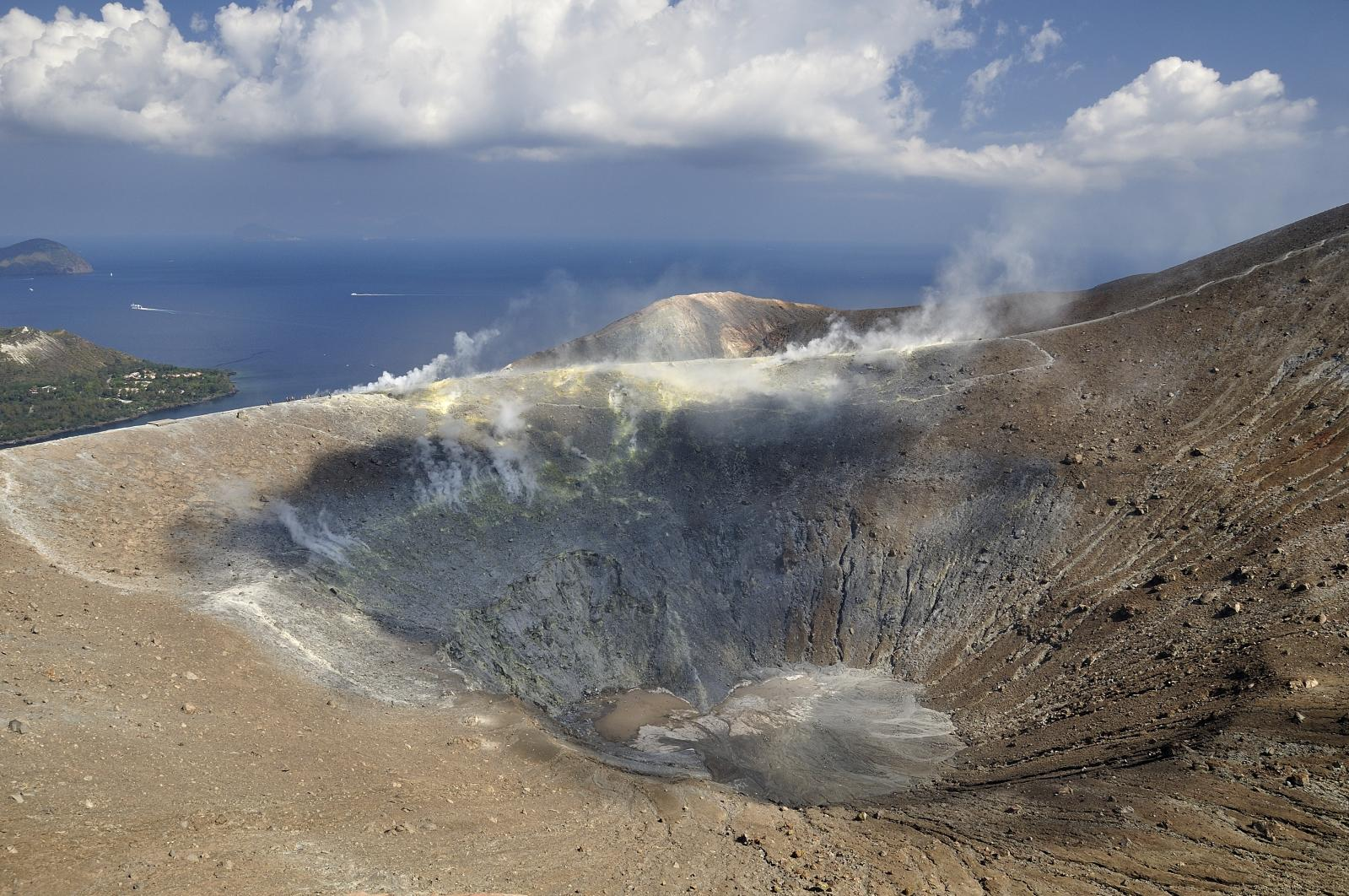
Crater on Vulcano Island

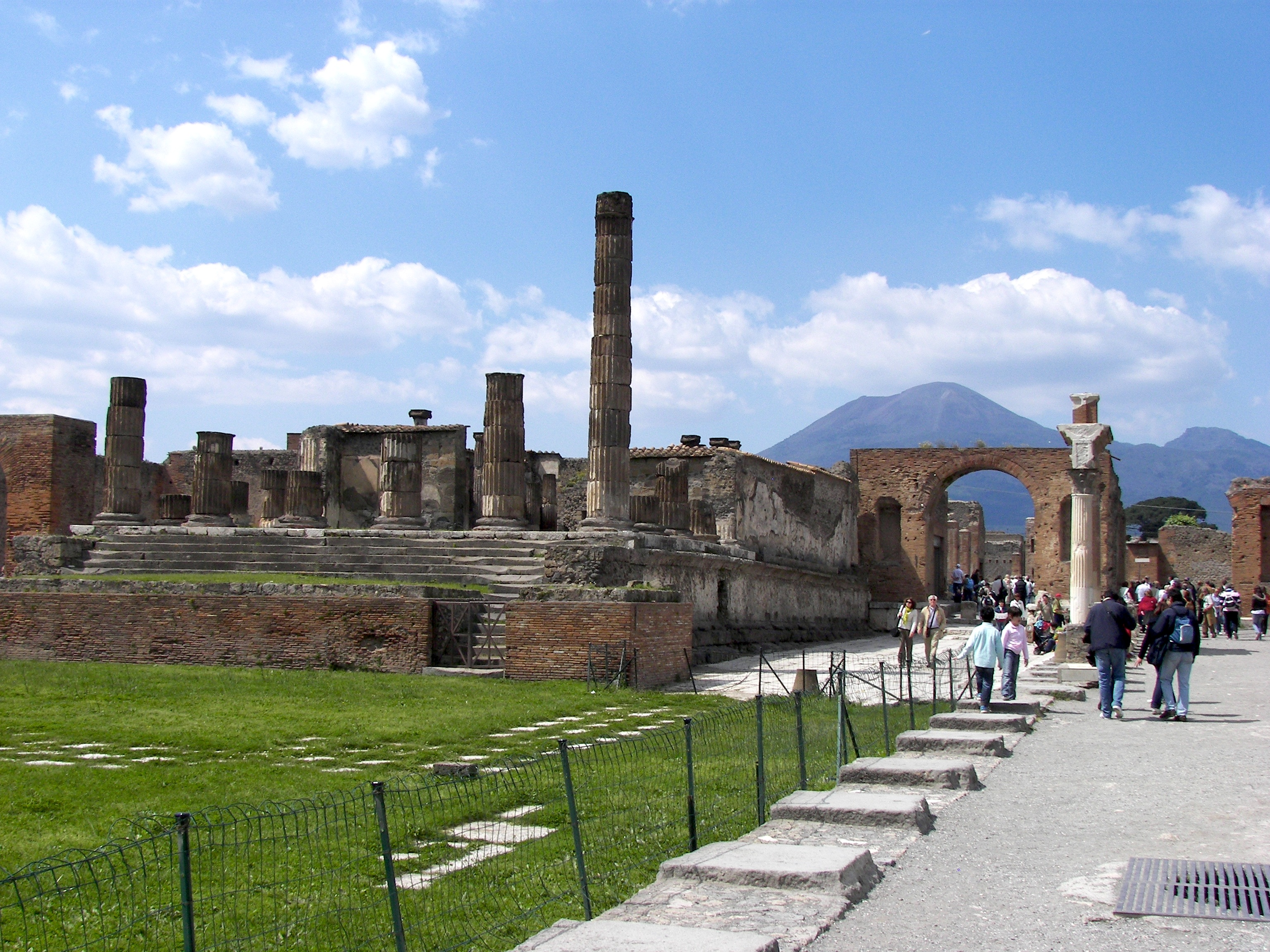
The Forum of Pompeii with Mount Vesuvius in the distance

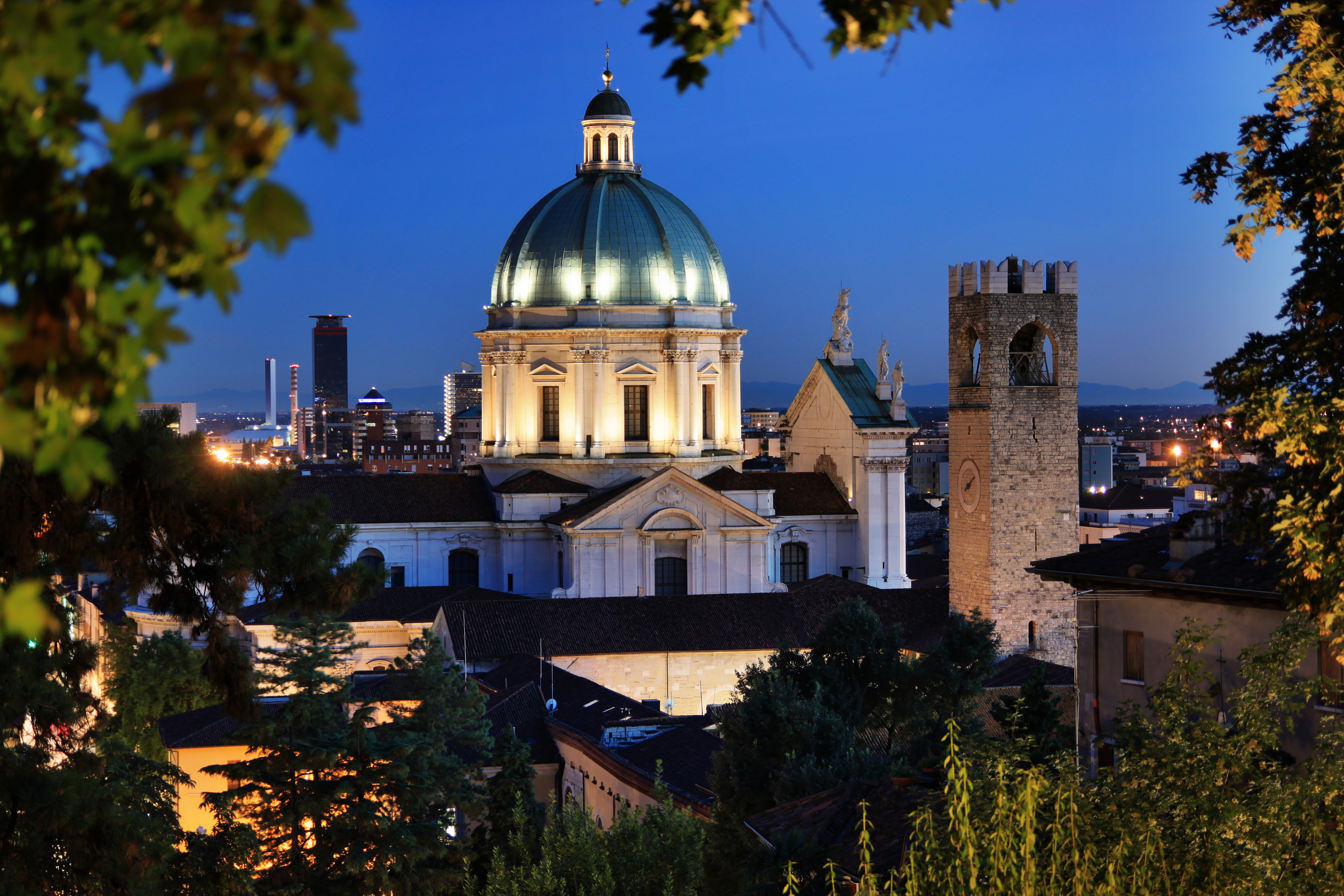
View of Brescia

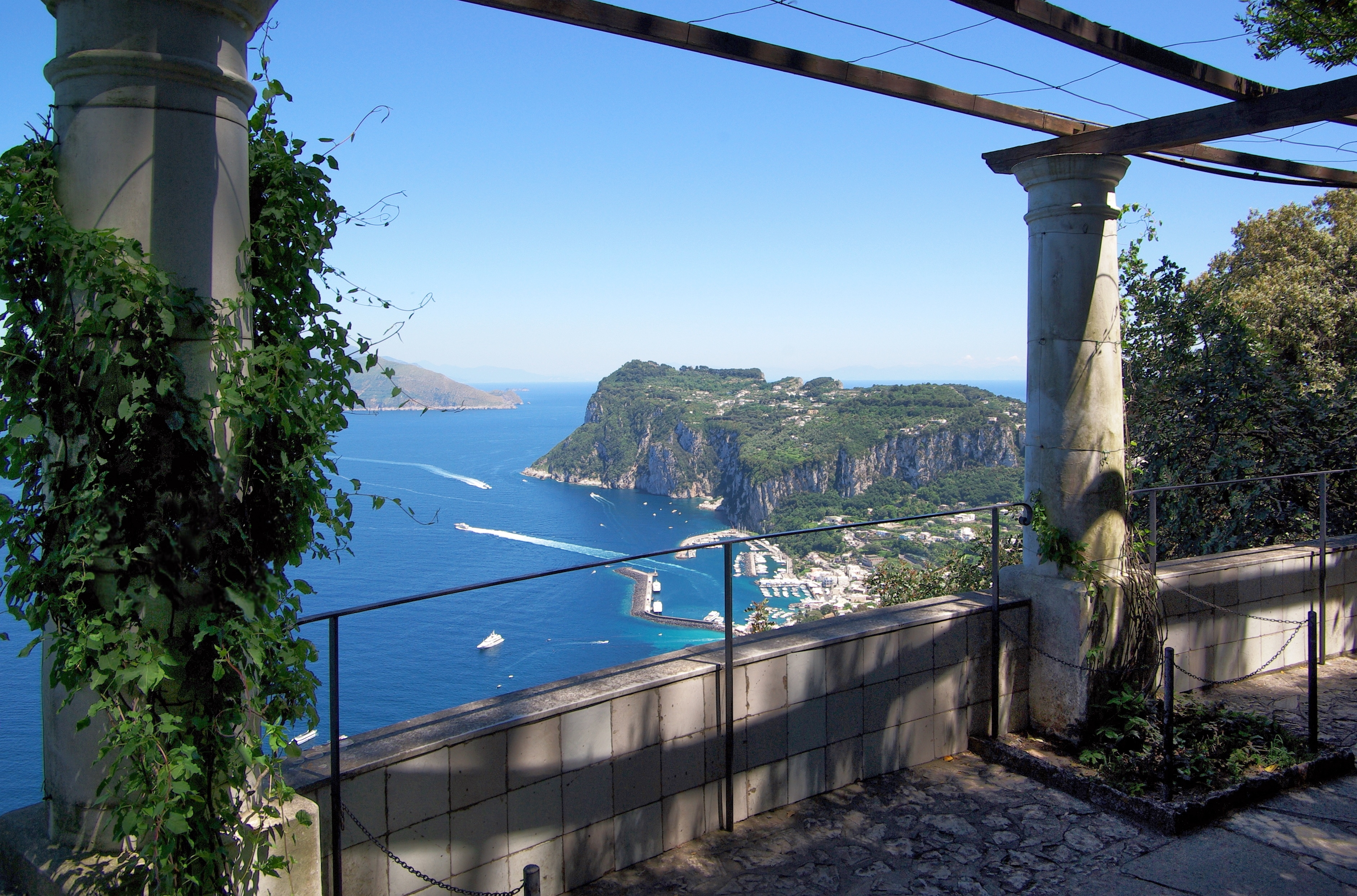
View of Capri

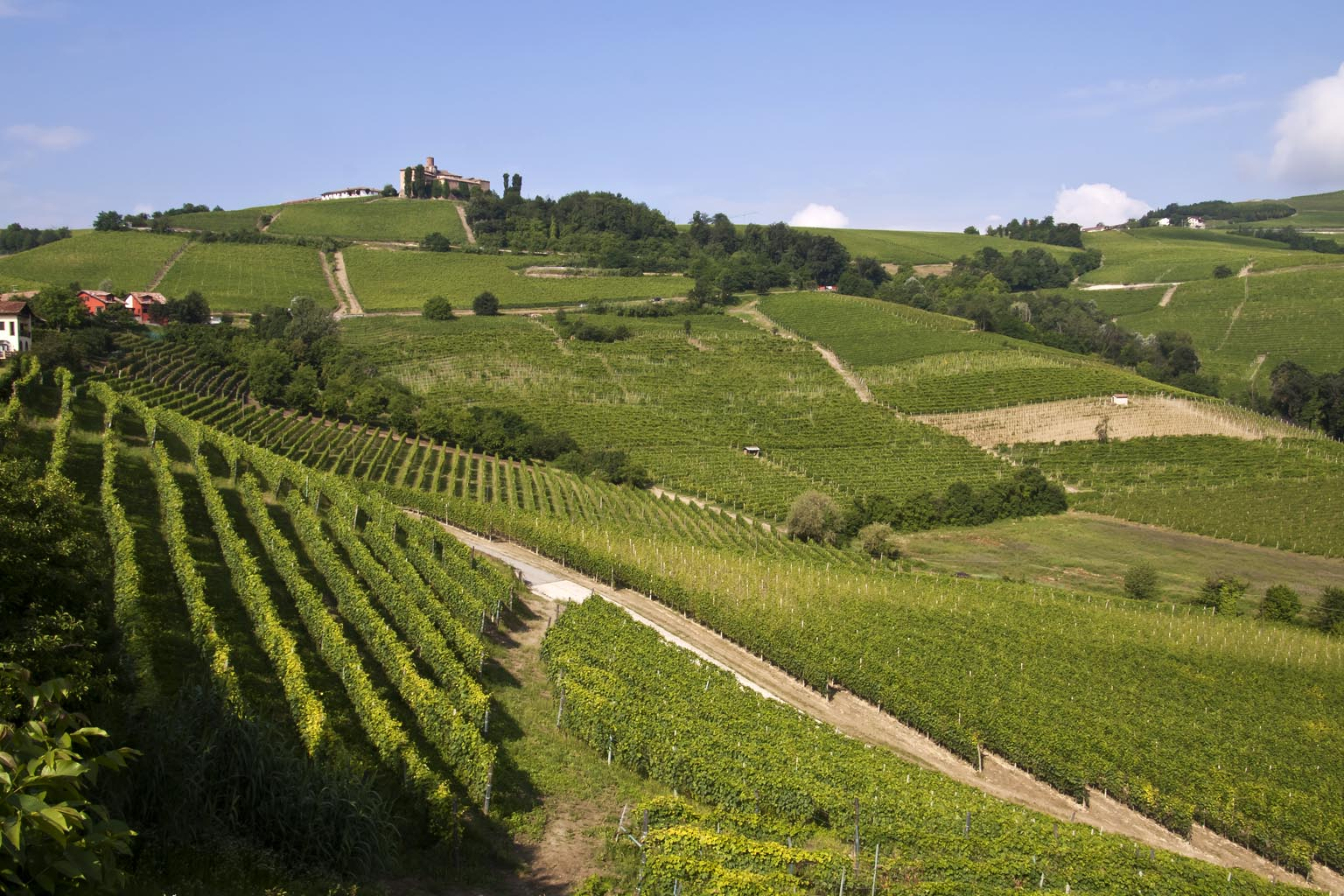
Langhe hills, Piedmont

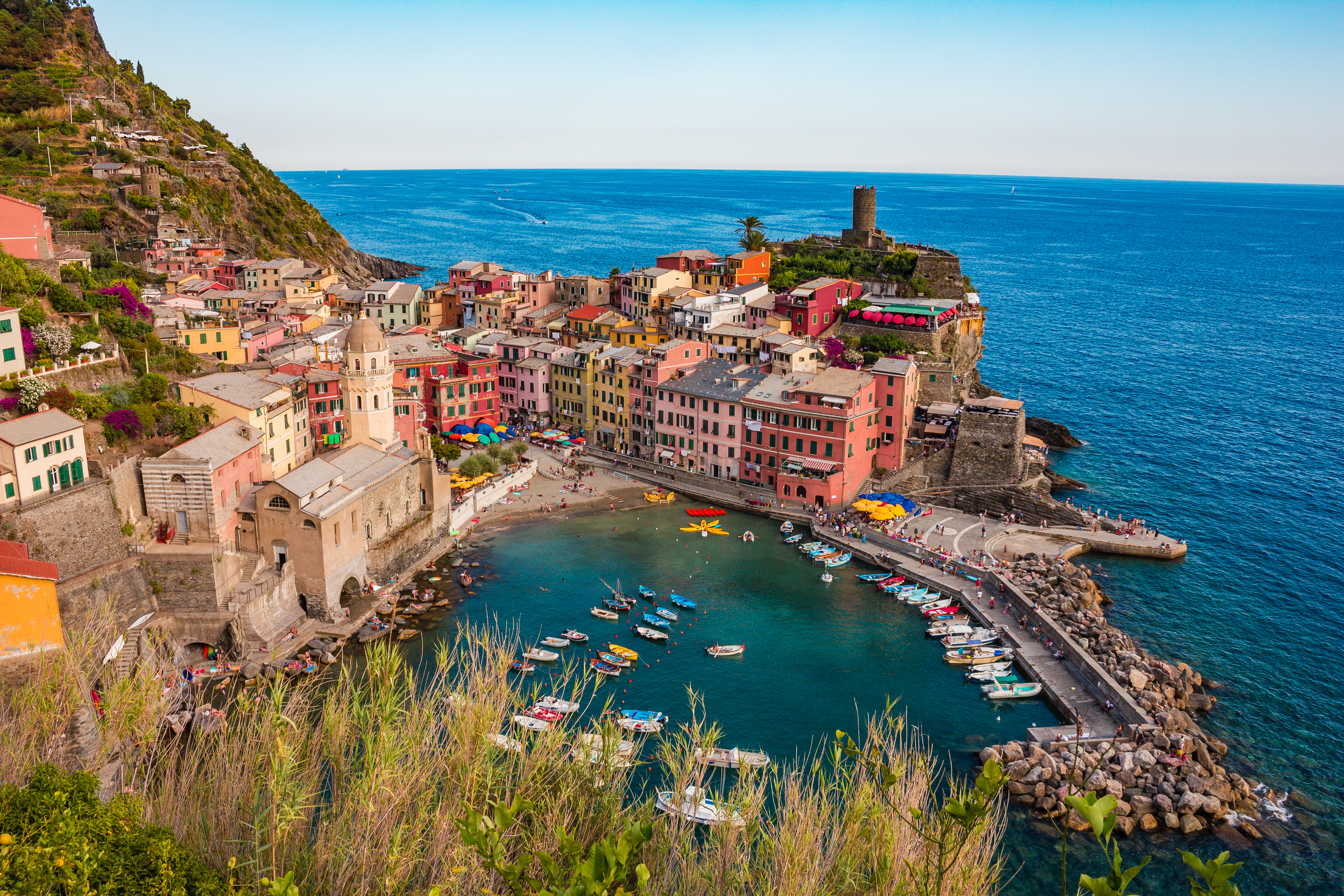
Cinque Terre on the Italian Riviera

- Italy is:
  - a peninsula: Italian Peninsula
  - a country
    - a member state of the European Union
    - a member state of NATO
  - a region: Italy (geographical region)
- Location:
  - Northern Hemisphere and Eastern Hemisphere
  - Eurasia
    - Europe
      - Western Europe
      - Southern Europe
        - Italian Peninsula
  - Time zone: Central European Time (UTC+01), Central European Summer Time (UTC+02)
    - Time in Italy
  - Extreme points of Italy
    - North: Glockenkarkopf
    - South: Punta Pesce Spada
    - East: Capo d'Otranto
    - West: Rocca Bernauda
    - High: Monte Bianco 4,810 m (15,781 ft)
    - Low: Contane on the Po Delta −3.2 m (−10 ft)
  - Land boundaries: 1,899 km

Switzerland (outline) 740 km
France (outline) 488 km
Austria (outline) 430 km
Slovenia (outline) 199 km
San Marino (outline) 39 km
Vatican City (outline) 3 km

- Coastline: 7,600 km
  - Mediterranean Sea: Ligurian, Tyrrhenian, Ionian, Adriatic, Sardinian seas

- Population of Italy: 58,968,501 people (2024/04/30 estimate) - 25th most populous country
- Area of Italy: 301,338 km^{2} (116,347 sq mi) - 71st largest country
- Atlas of Italy

=== Environment of Italy ===
- Climate of Italy
  - Climate change in Italy
- Conservation in Italy
- National parks of Italy
- Marine protected areas of Italy
- Regional parks of Italy
  - Renewable energy in Italy
    - Biofuel in Italy
    - Geothermal power in Italy
    - Hydroelectricity in Italy
    - Solar power in Italy
    - Wind power in Italy
- Ecoregions in Italy
- Geology of Italy
- Natural hazards in Italy
  - Volcanism of Italy
  - Earthquakes in Italy
- Wildlife of Italy
  - Flora of Italy
  - Fauna of Italy
    - Amphibians of Italy
    - Birds of Italy
    - Mammals of Italy
    - Reptiles of Italy
    - Snakes of Italy

==== Geographic features of Italy ====
- Beaches in Italy
- Canals in Italy
- Caves in Italy
- Earthquakes in Italy
- Glaciers of Italy
- Islands of Italy
- Lakes of Italy
- Mountains of Italy
  - Alpine foothills
  - Alps
  - Apennine Mountains
  - Volcanoes in Italy
- Rivers of Italy
- Valleys of Italy
- World Heritage Sites in Italy (See also Transboundary sites)

=== Regions of Italy ===
Regions of Italy

==== Administrative divisions types ====
- Regions of Italy
  - Provinces of Italy
  - Metropolitan cities of Italy
    - Comuni (Municipalities)
      - Frazioni

==== Statistical divisions of Italy ====
NUTS of Italy

===== Groups of regions, regions, and provinces/metropolitan cities of Italy =====
- Northwest Italy (Northern Italy
  - Piedmont (Region)
    - Metropolitan City of Turin
    - Province of Vercelli
    - Province of Biella
    - Province of Verbano-Cusio-Ossola
    - Province of Novara
    - Province of Cuneo
    - Province of Asti
    - Province of Alessandria
  - Valle d'Aosta (Region)
    - Aosta (Province)
  - Liguria (Region)
    - Province of Imperia
    - Province of Savona
    - Metropolitan City of Genoa
    - Province of La Spezia
  - Lombardy (Region)
    - Province of Varese
    - Province of Como
    - Province of Lecco
    - Province of Sondrio
    - Metropolitan City of Milan
    - Province of Monza and Brianza
    - Province of Bergamo
    - Province of Brescia
    - Province of Pavia
    - Province of Lodi
    - Province of Cremona
    - Province of Mantua
- Northeast Italy (Northern Italy)
  - Trentino-Alto Adige/Südtirol (Region)
    - Province of Bolzano/Bozen
    - Province of Trento
  - Veneto (Region)
    - Province of Verona
    - Province of Vicenza
    - Province of Belluno
    - Province of Treviso
    - Metropolitan City of Venice
    - Province of Padua
    - Province of Rovigo
  - Friuli-Venezia Giulia (Region)
    - Province of Pordenone
    - Province of Udine
    - Province of Gorizia
    - Province of Trieste
  - Emilia-Romagna (Region)
    - Province of Piacenza
    - Province of Parma
    - Province of Reggio Emilia
    - Province of Modena
    - Metropolitan City of Bologna
    - Province of Ferrara
    - Province of Ravenna
    - Province of Forlì-Cesena
    - Province of Rimini
- Central Italy
  - Tuscany (Region)
    - Province of Massa-Carrara
    - Province of Lucca
    - Province of Pistoia
    - Metropolitan City of Florence
    - Province of Prato
    - Province of Livorno
    - Province of Pisa
    - Province of Arezzo
    - Province of Siena
    - Province of Grosseto
  - Umbria (Region)
    - Province of Perugia
    - Province of Terni
  - Marches (Region)
    - Province of Pesaro e Urbino
    - Province of Ancona
    - Province of Macerata
    - Province of Fermo
    - Province of Ascoli Piceno
  - Lazio (Region)
    - Province of Viterbo
    - Province of Rieti
    - Metropolitan City of Rome Capital
    - Province of Latina
    - Province of Frosinone
- Southern Italy
  - Abruzzo (Region)
    - Province of L'Aquila
    - Province of Teramo
    - Province of Pescara
    - Province of Chieti
  - Molise (Region)
    - Province of Isernia
    - Province of Campobasso
  - Campania (Region)
    - Province of Caserta
    - Province of Benevento
    - Metropolitan City of Naples
    - Province of Avellino
    - Province of Salerno
  - Apulia (Region)
    - Province of Foggia
    - Province of Barletta-Andria-Trani
    - Metropolitan City of Bari
    - Province of Taranto
    - Province of Brindisi
    - Province of Lecce
  - Basilicata (Region)
    - Province of Potenza
    - Province of Matera
  - Calabria (Region)
    - Province of Cosenza
    - Province of Crotone
    - Province of Catanzaro
    - Province of Vibo Valentia
    - Metropolitan City of Reggio Calabria
- Insular Italy
  - Sicily (Region)
    - Province of Trapani
    - Metropolitan City of Palermo
    - Metropolitan City of Messina
    - Province of Agrigento
    - Province of Caltanissetta
    - Province of Enna
    - Metropolitan City of Catania
    - Province of Ragusa
    - Province of Siracusa
  - Sardinia (Region)
    - Province of Olbia-Tempio
    - Province of Sassari
    - Province of Nuoro
    - Province of Ogliastra
    - Province of Oristano
    - Province of Medio Campidano
    - Metropolitan City of Cagliari
    - Province of Carbonia-Iglesias

===== Comuni (municipalities) of Italy =====
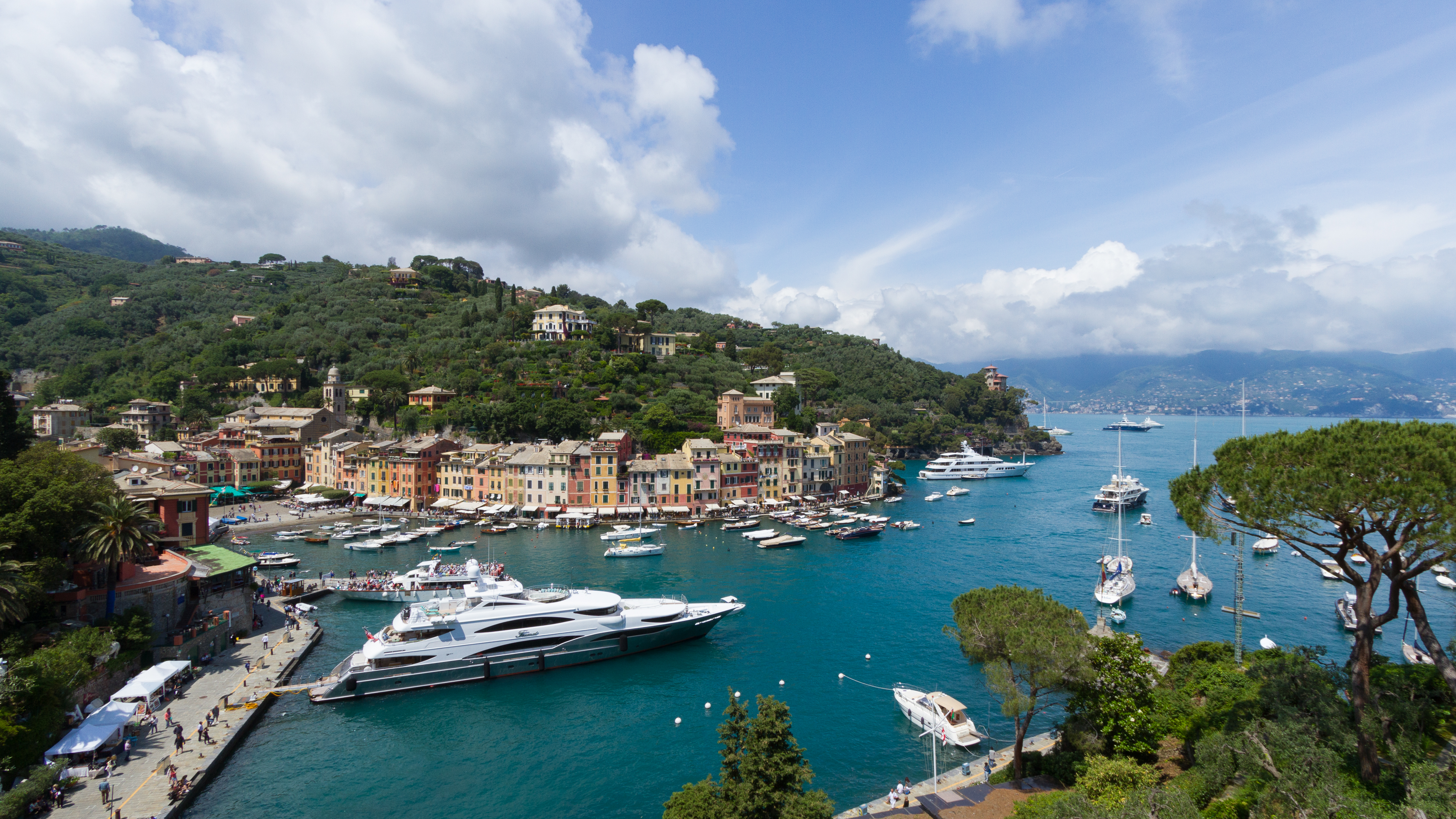
View of Portofino

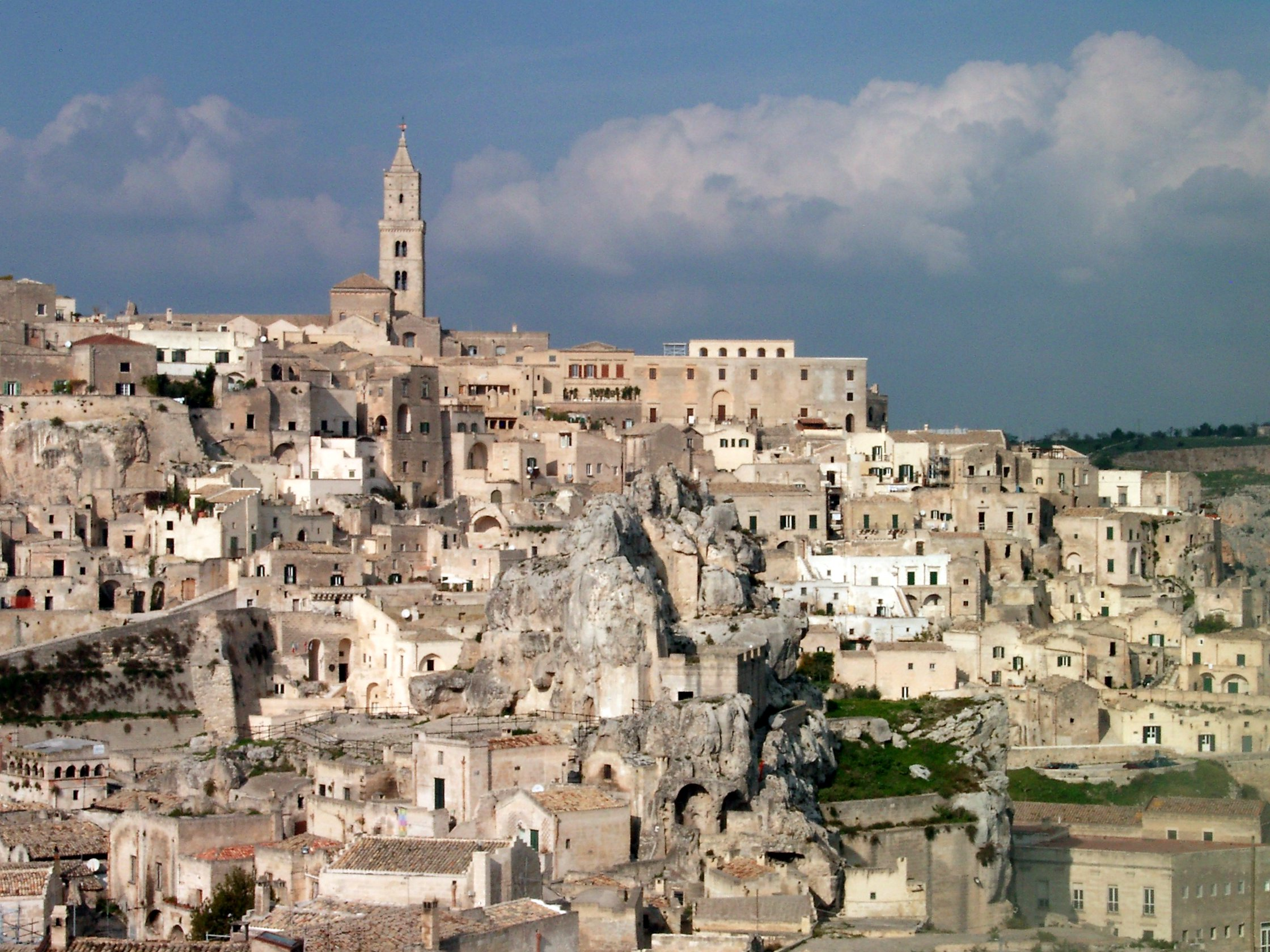
Sassi di Matera

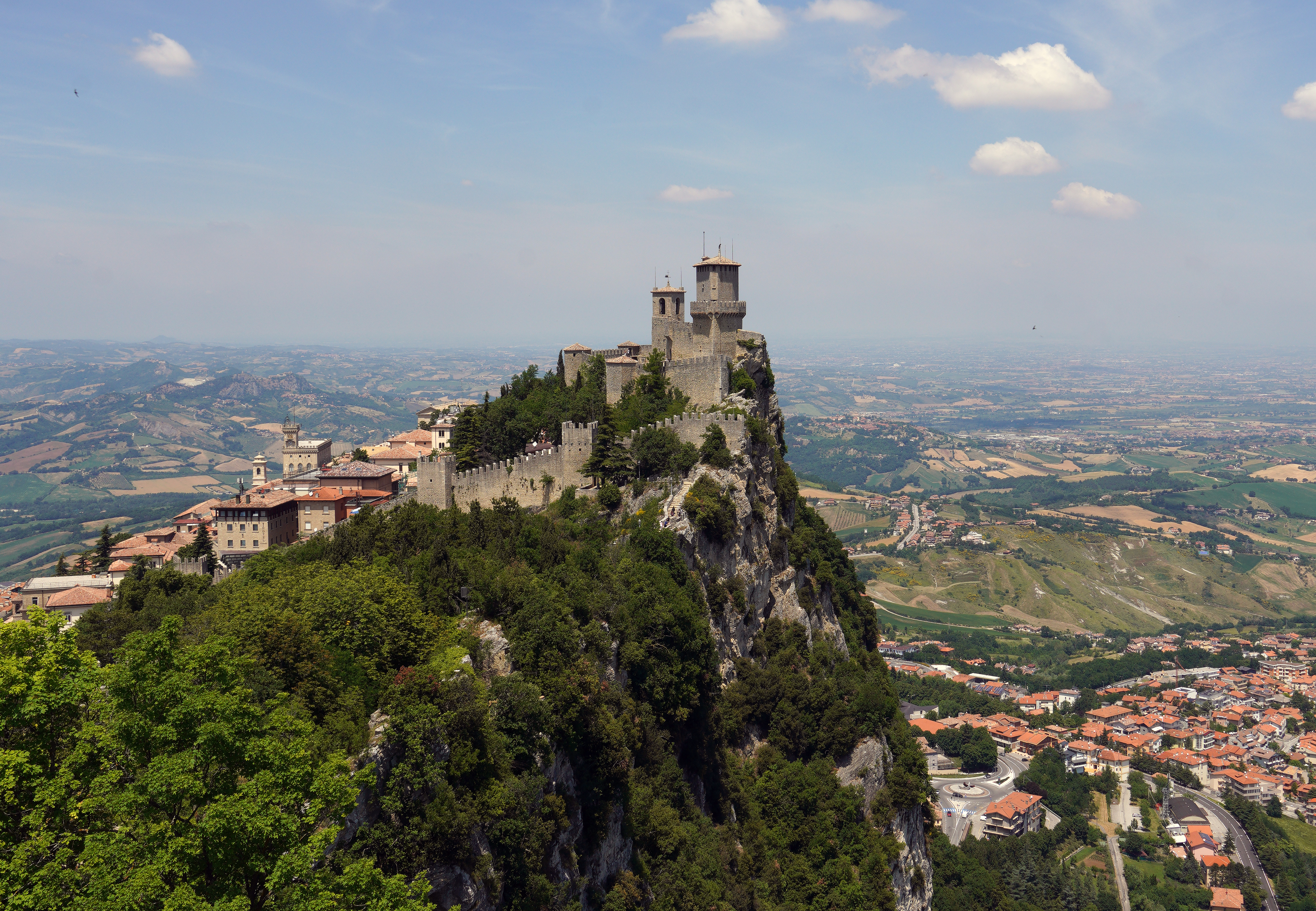
San Marino

- Cities of Italy
  - Capital of Italy: Rome
  - Cities in Italy over 100,000 population
  - Hilltowns in Italy

=== Demographics of Italy ===
Demographics of Italy

=== Neighbors of Italy ===
Italy shares its north border with:

- Austria
- France
- Slovenia
- Switzerland shares Italy's northern border, and Campione d'Italia is an Italian exclave in Switzerland.

Independent states surrounded by Italy (otherwise within Italy's borders) include:

- San Marino
- Vatican City

== Government and politics of Italy ==
Politics of Italy

- Form of government: parliamentary multi-party representative democratic republic
- Capital of Italy: Rome
- Corruption in Italy
- Elections in Italy
  - Primary elections in Italy
- Orders, decorations, and medals of Italy
- Political ideologies in Italy
  - Anarchism in Italy
  - Liberalism and radicalism in Italy
  - Socialism in Italy
- Political parties in Italy
- Political scandals of Italy
- Public administration in Italy
- Racism in Italy
- Taxation in Italy

=== Branches of the government of Italy ===
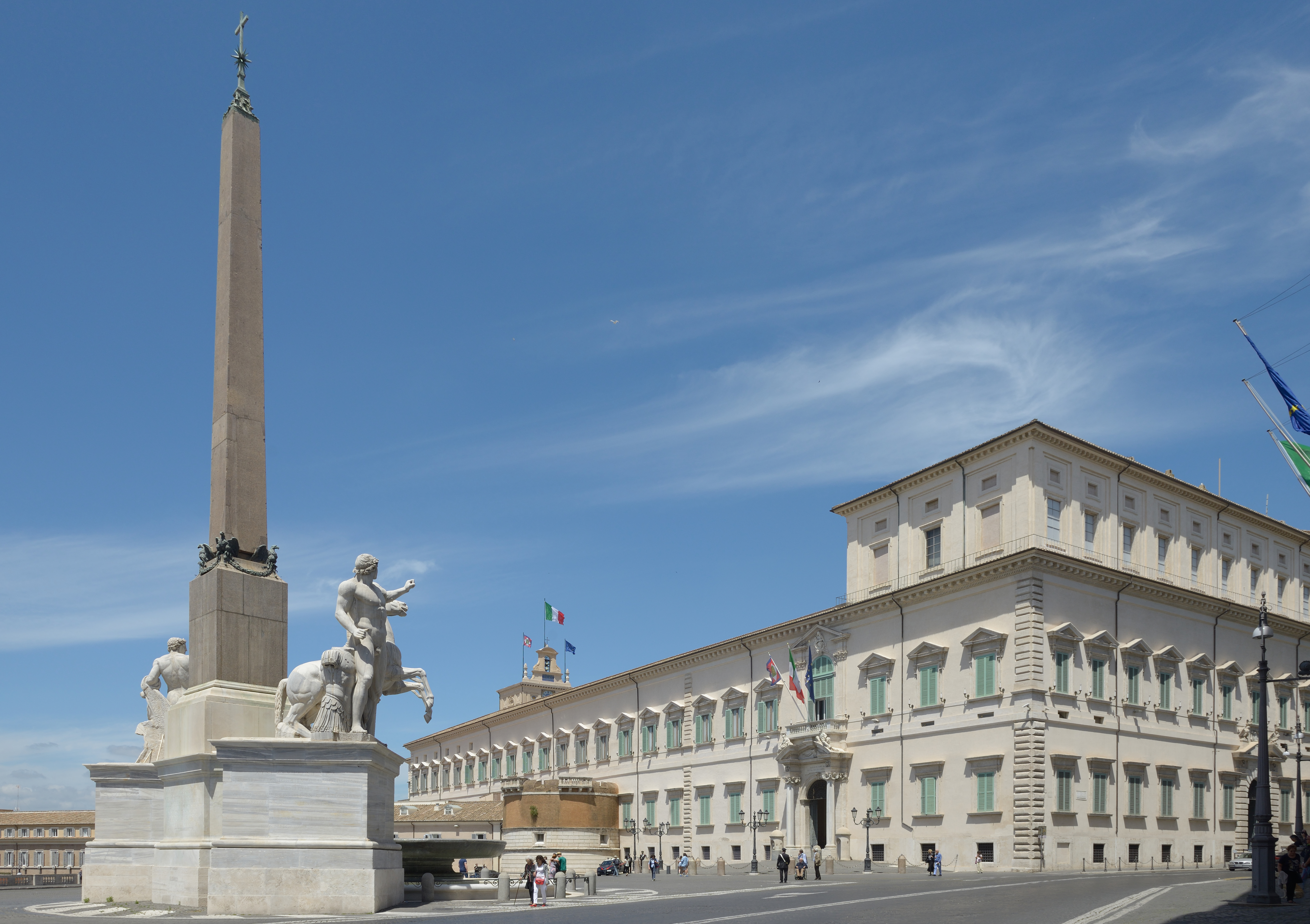
The Quirinal Palace, residence of the President of the Italian Republic

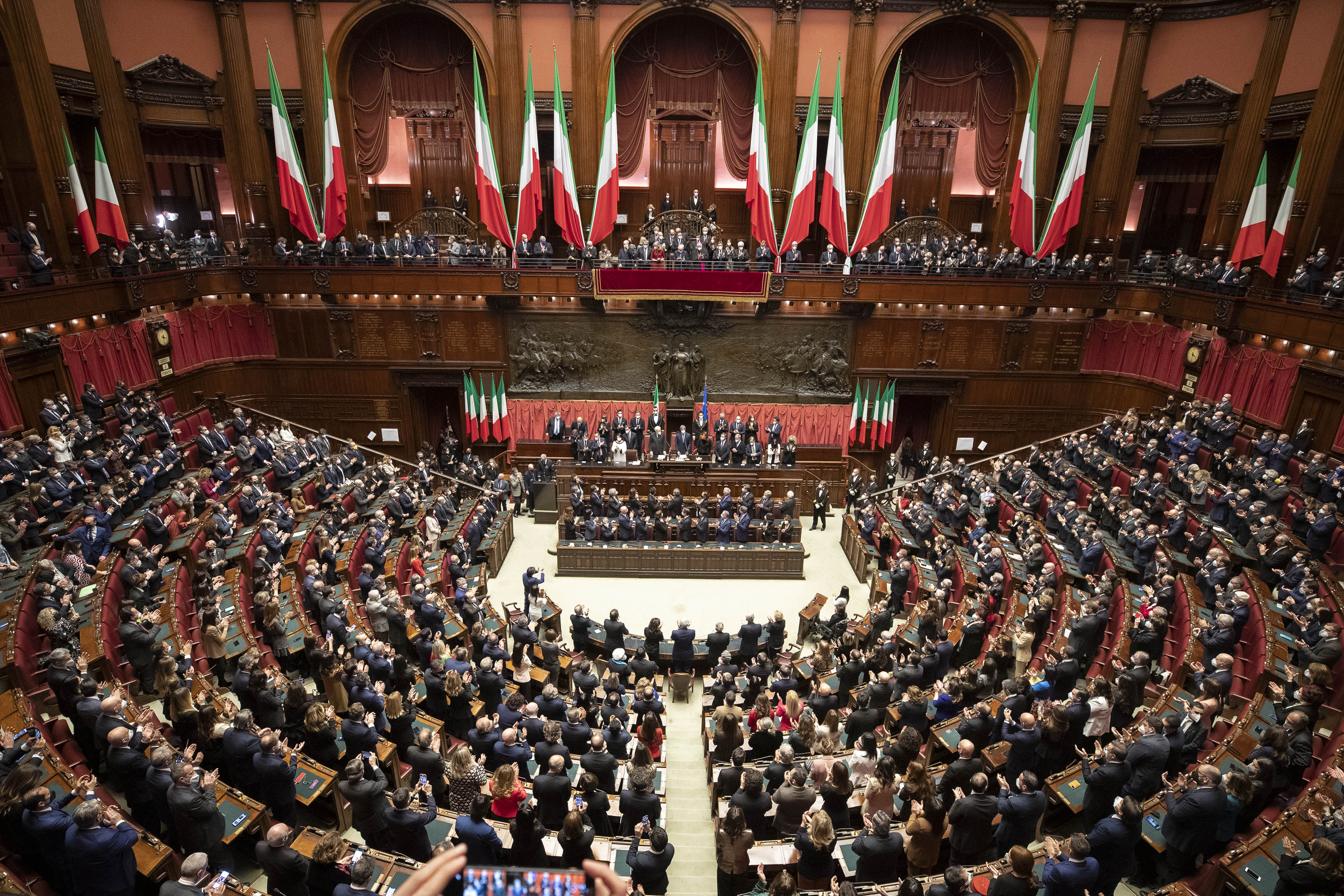
The Italian Parliament in joint session for a presidential inauguration

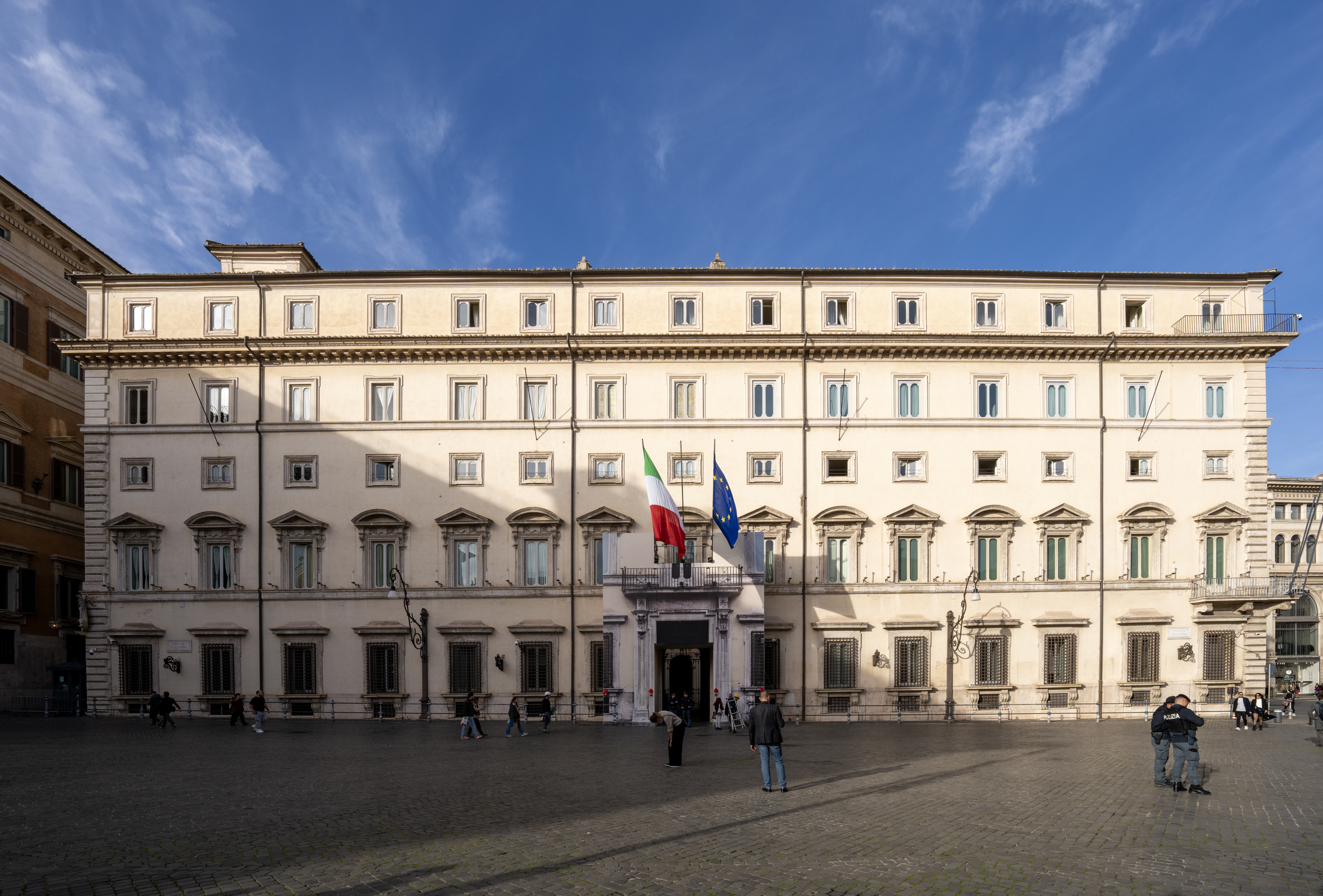
Chigi Palace, seat of the Council of Ministers and the official residence of the Prime Minister of Italy

Government of Italy

==== Head of State ====
- President of Italy (see also Head of State)
  - List of presidents of Italy

==== Executive branch ====
- Prime Minister of Italy (a.k.a. President of the Council of Ministers, see also Head of government)
  - List of prime ministers of Italy
- Council of Ministers of Italy

==== Legislative branch ====
- Parliament of Italy
  - Italian Chamber of Deputies (lower house)
  - Italian Senate (upper house)

==== Judicial branch ====
- Judiciary of Italy
  - Supreme Court of Cassation (Corte Suprema di Cassazione)
  - Constitutional Court of Italy

==== Local government ====
- Regions of Italy
- Province
- Metropolitan cities of Italy
- Comune

=== Foreign relations of Italy ===
Foreign relations of Italy

- CIA activities in Italy
- Italian soft power
- List of diplomatic missions of Italy

==== International organization membership ====
The Italian Republic is a member of:

- African Development Bank Group (AfDB) (nonregional member)
- Arctic Council (observer)
- Asian Development Bank (ADB) (nonregional member)
- Australia Group
- Bank for International Settlements (BIS)
- Black Sea Economic Cooperation Zone (BSEC) (observer)
- Caribbean Development Bank (CDB)
- Central American Integration System (SICA) (observer)
- Central European Initiative (CEI)
- Confederation of European Paper Industries (CEPI)
- Council of Europe (CE)
- Council of the Baltic Sea States (CBSS) (observer)
- Economic and Monetary Union (EMU)
- Euro-Atlantic Partnership Council (EAPC)
- European Bank for Reconstruction and Development (EBRD)
- European Investment Bank (EIB)
- European Organization for Nuclear Research (CERN)
- European Space Agency (ESA)
- European Union (EU)
- Food and Agriculture Organization (FAO)
- Group of Seven (G7)
- Group of Eight (G8)
- Group of Ten (G10)
- Group of Twenty Finance Ministers and Central Bank Governors (G20)
- Inter-American Development Bank (IADB)
- International Atomic Energy Agency (IAEA)
- International Bank for Reconstruction and Development (IBRD)
- International Chamber of Commerce (ICC)
- International Civil Aviation Organization (ICAO)
- International Criminal Court (ICCt)
- International Criminal Police Organization (Interpol)
- International Development Association (IDA)
- International Energy Agency (IEA)
- International Federation of Red Cross and Red Crescent Societies (IFRCS)
- International Finance Corporation (IFC)
- International Fund for Agricultural Development (IFAD)
- International Hydrographic Organization (IHO)
- International Labour Organization (ILO)
- International Maritime Organization (IMO)
- International Mobile Satellite Organization (IMSO)
- International Monetary Fund (IMF)
- International Olympic Committee (IOC)
- International Organization for Migration (IOM)
- International Organization for Standardization (ISO)
- International Red Cross and Red Crescent Movement (ICRM)
- International Telecommunication Union (ITU)
- International Telecommunications Satellite Organization (ITSO)
- International Trade Union Confederation (ITUC)
- Inter-Parliamentary Union (IPU)
- Latin American Economic System (LAES) (observer)
- Multilateral Investment Guarantee Agency (MIGA)
- Nonaligned Movement (NAM) (guest)
- North Atlantic Treaty Organization (NATO)
- Nuclear Energy Agency (NEA)
- Nuclear Suppliers Group (NSG)
- Organisation for Economic Co-operation and Development (OECD)
- Organization for Security and Cooperation in Europe (OSCE)
- Organisation for the Prohibition of Chemical Weapons (OPCW)
- Organization of American States (OAS) (observer)
- Paris Club
- Permanent Court of Arbitration (PCA)
- Schengen Convention
- Southeast European Cooperative Initiative (SECI) (observer)
- Unione Latina
- United Nations (UN)
- United Nations Conference on Trade and Development (UNCTAD)
- United Nations Educational, Scientific, and Cultural Organization (UNESCO)
- United Nations High Commissioner for Refugees (UNHCR)
- United Nations Industrial Development Organization (UNIDO)
- United Nations Interim Force in Lebanon (UNIFIL)
- United Nations Military Observer Group in India and Pakistan (UNMOGIP)
- United Nations Mission for the Referendum in Western Sahara (MINURSO)
- United Nations Relief and Works Agency for Palestine Refugees in the Near East (UNRWA)
- United Nations Truce Supervision Organization (UNTSO)
- Universal Postal Union (UPU)
- Western European Union (WEU)
- World Confederation of Labour (WCL)
- World Customs Organization (WCO)
- World Federation of Trade Unions (WFTU)
- World Health Organization (WHO)
- World Intellectual Property Organization (WIPO)
- World Meteorological Organization (WMO)
- World Tourism Organization (UNWTO)
- World Trade Organization (WTO)
- World Veterans Federation
- Zangger Committee (ZC)

=== Law and order in Italy ===
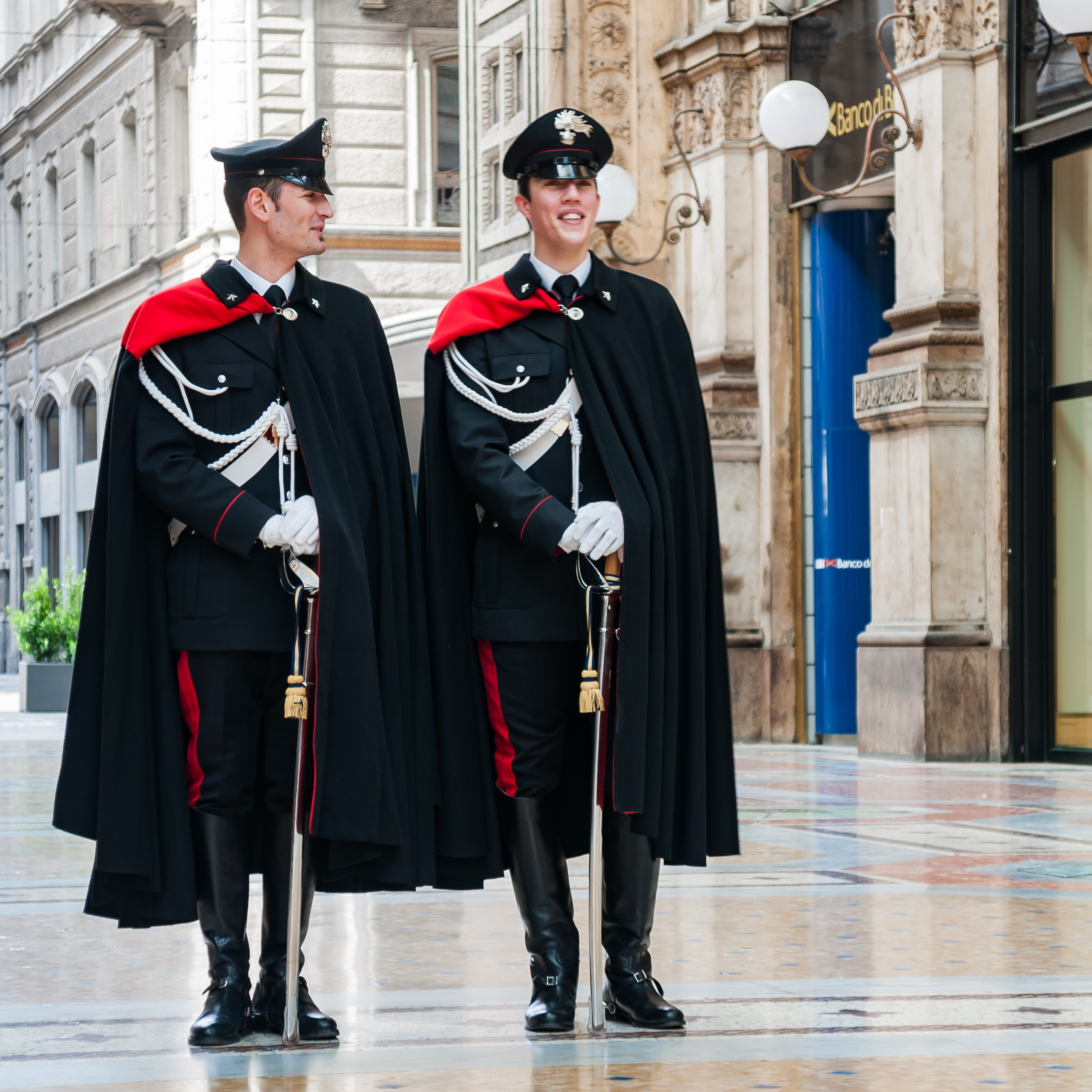
Carabinieri with capes

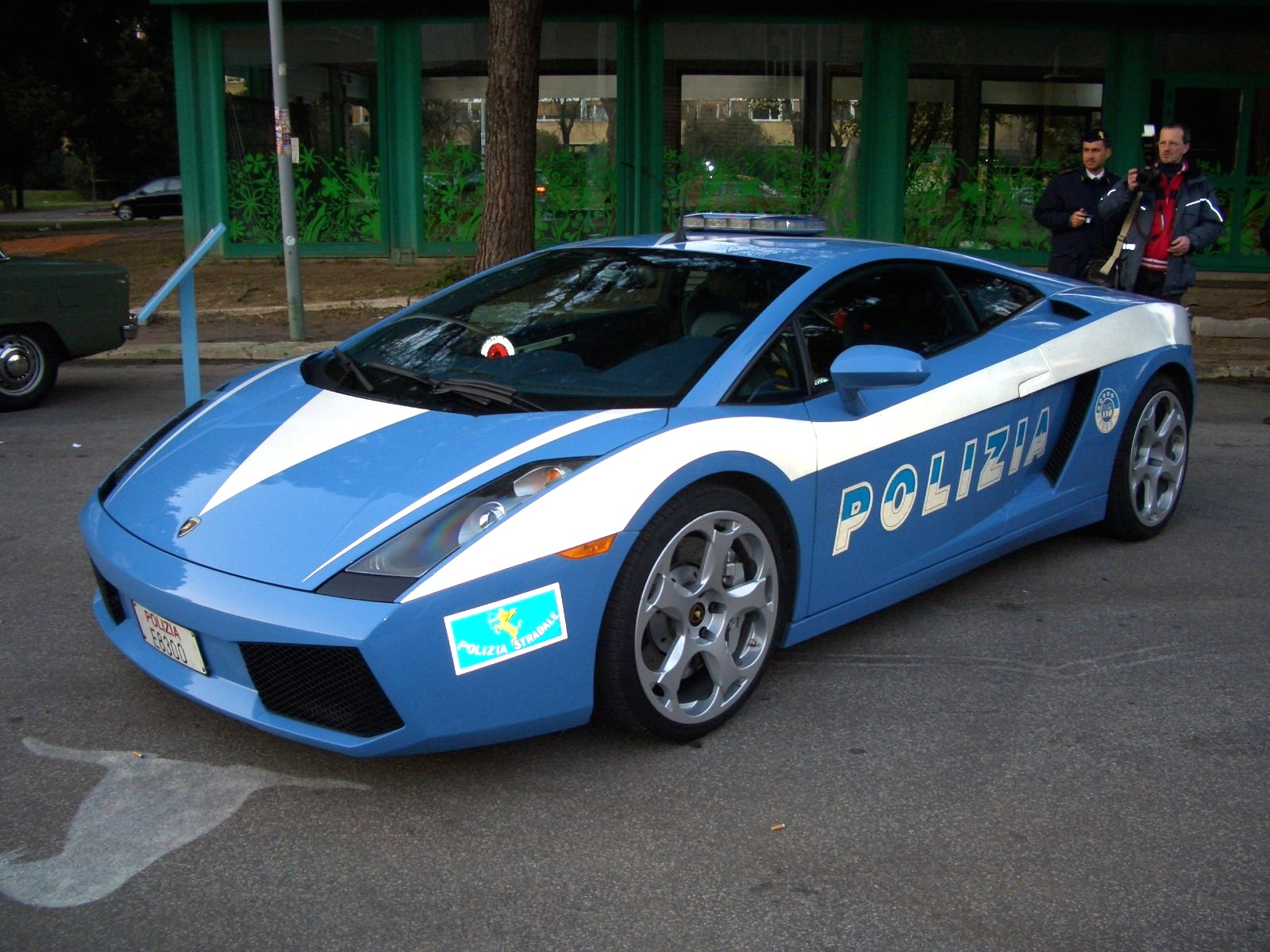
In 2004 the Polizia di Stato received two Lamborghini Gallardo equipped with V10 engines in the classic blue white livery.

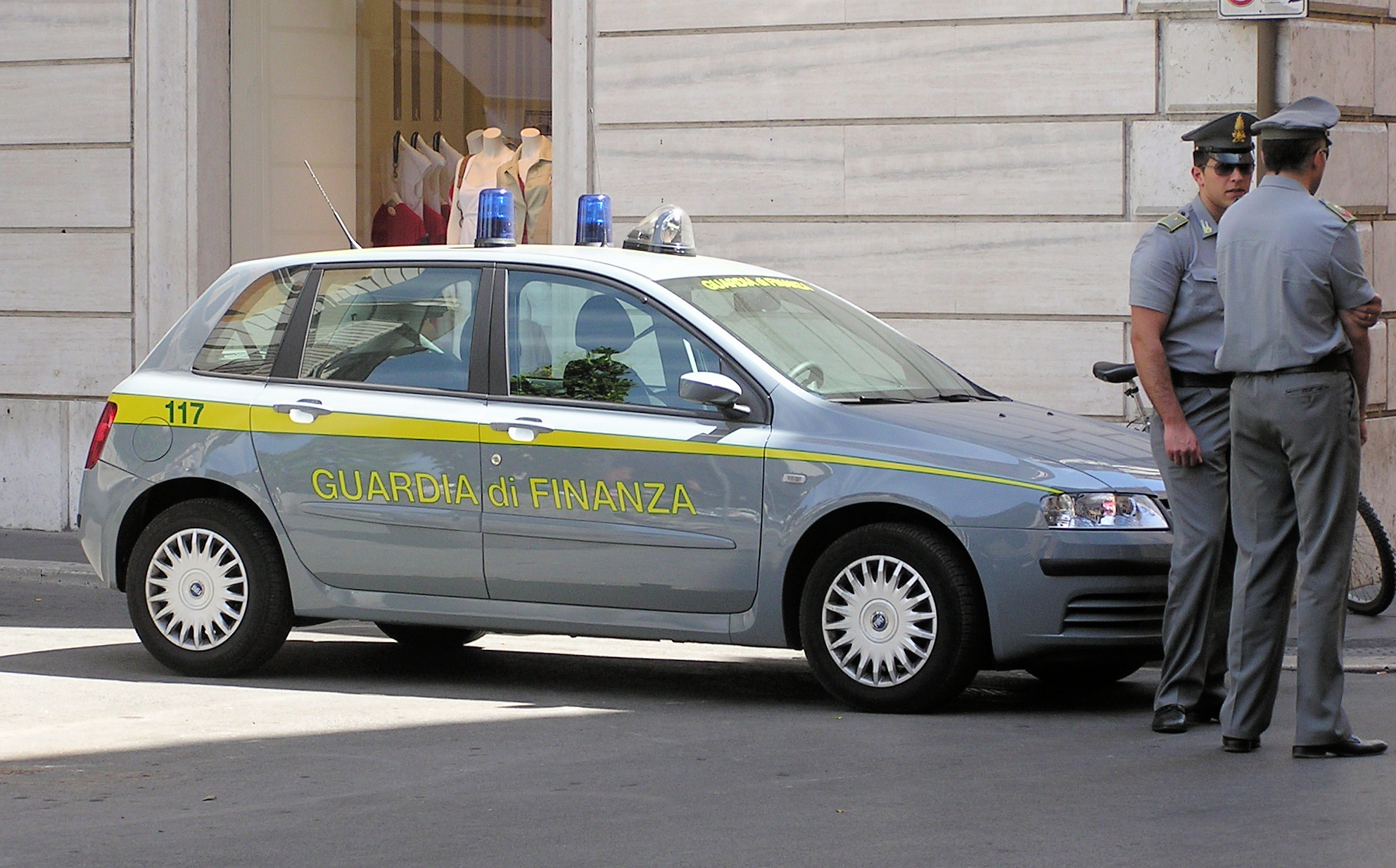
Guardia di Finanza police in central Rome

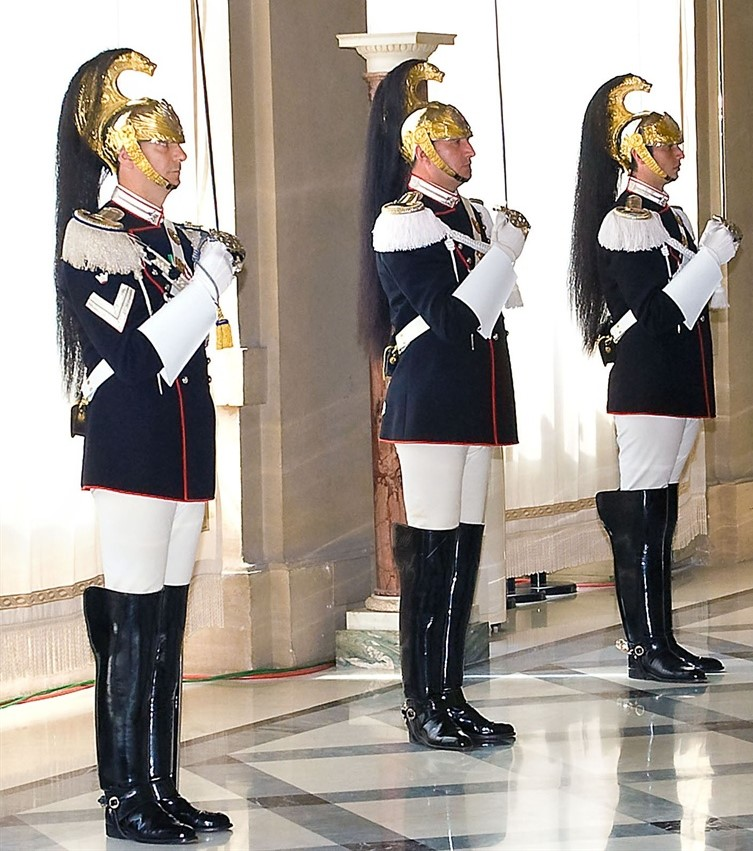
Corazzieri at the Quirinal Palace in Rome

- Law of Italy
  - Capital punishment in Italy
  - Censorship in Italy
  - Constitution of Italy
    - Institutions of constitutional importance
  - Copyright law of Italy
  - Italian Code of Criminal Procedure
  - Italian law codes
  - Italian nationality law
  - Life imprisonment in Italy
  - Speed limits in Italy
- Crime in Italy
  - Corruption in Italy
  - Human trafficking in Italy
  - Organized crime in Italy
  - Prostitution in Italy
  - Terrorism in Italy
- Human rights in Italy
  - Abortion in Italy
  - Fathers' rights
  - Freedom of the press in Italy
  - Freedom of religion in Italy
  - LGBT rights in Italy
    - Recognition of same-sex unions in Italy
  - Religious freedom in Italy
- Judiciary of Italy
- Law enforcement in Italy
  - Carabinieri
    - Carabinieri Art Squad
    - Carabinieri Cavalry Regiment
    - Corazzieri
    - Carabinieri Mobile Units Division
    - Gruppo di intervento speciale
    - Raggruppamento Operativo Speciale
  - Guardia di Finanza
    - Counter-terrorism Rapid Response
    - Gruppo di investigazione criminalità organizzata
  - Italian intelligence agencies
  - Municipal police (Italy)
  - Polizia di Stato
    - Divisione Investigazioni Generali e Operazioni Speciali
    - Nucleo Operativo Centrale di Sicurezza
    - Polizia Ferroviaria
    - Polizia Stradale
  - Polizia Penitenziaria
  - Provincial police

=== Military of Italy ===
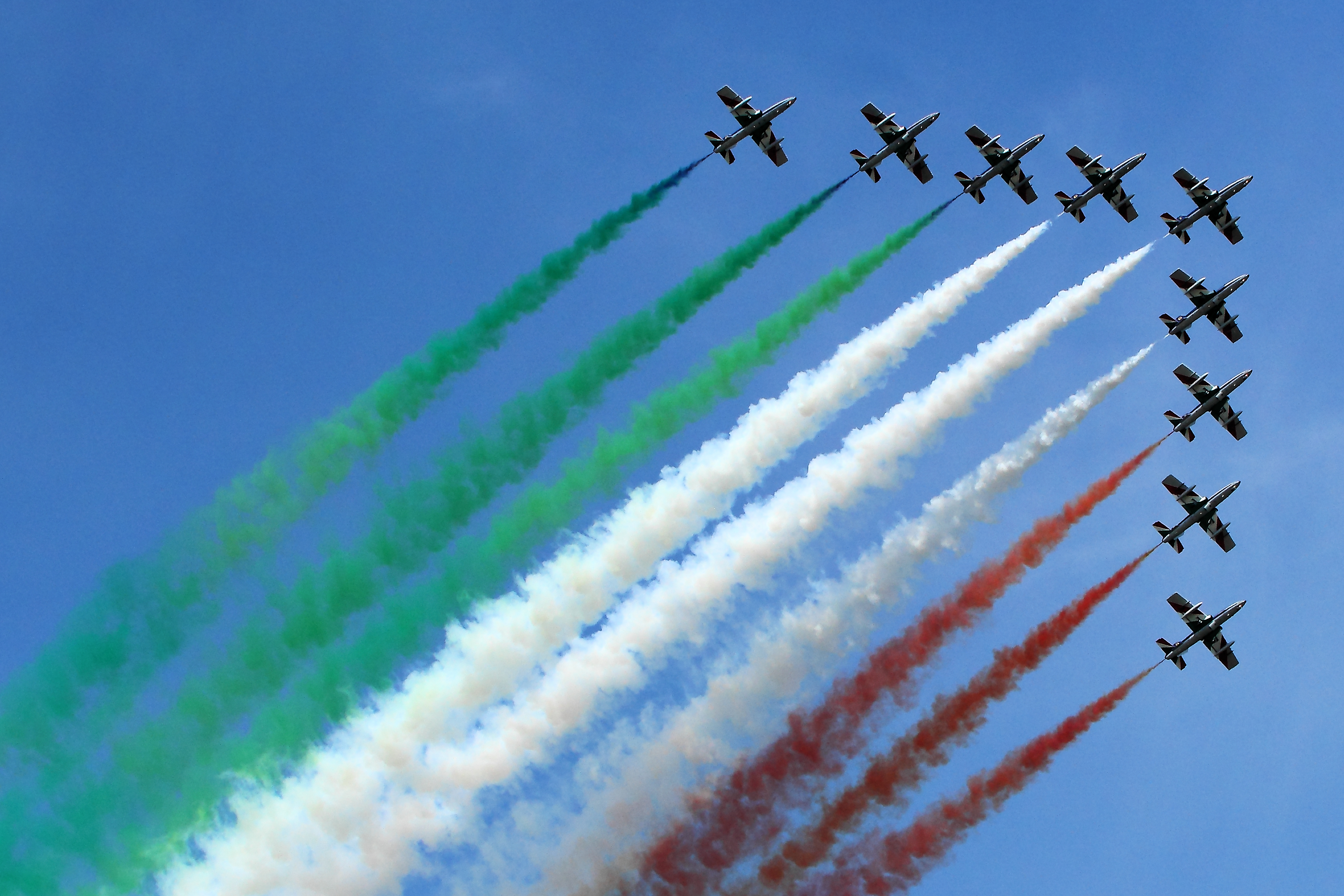
Frecce Tricolori, the aerobatic demonstration team of the Italian Air Force

Military of Italy

- Armed forces of Italy:
  - Army of Italy: Esercito Italiano
  - Navy of Italy: Marina Militare
    - Corps of the Port Captaincies – Coast Guard
  - Air force of Italy: Aeronautica Militare
  - Gendarmerie of Italy: Carabinieri
  - Guardia di Finanza
- Military history of Italy
- Wars involving Italy

== History of Italy ==
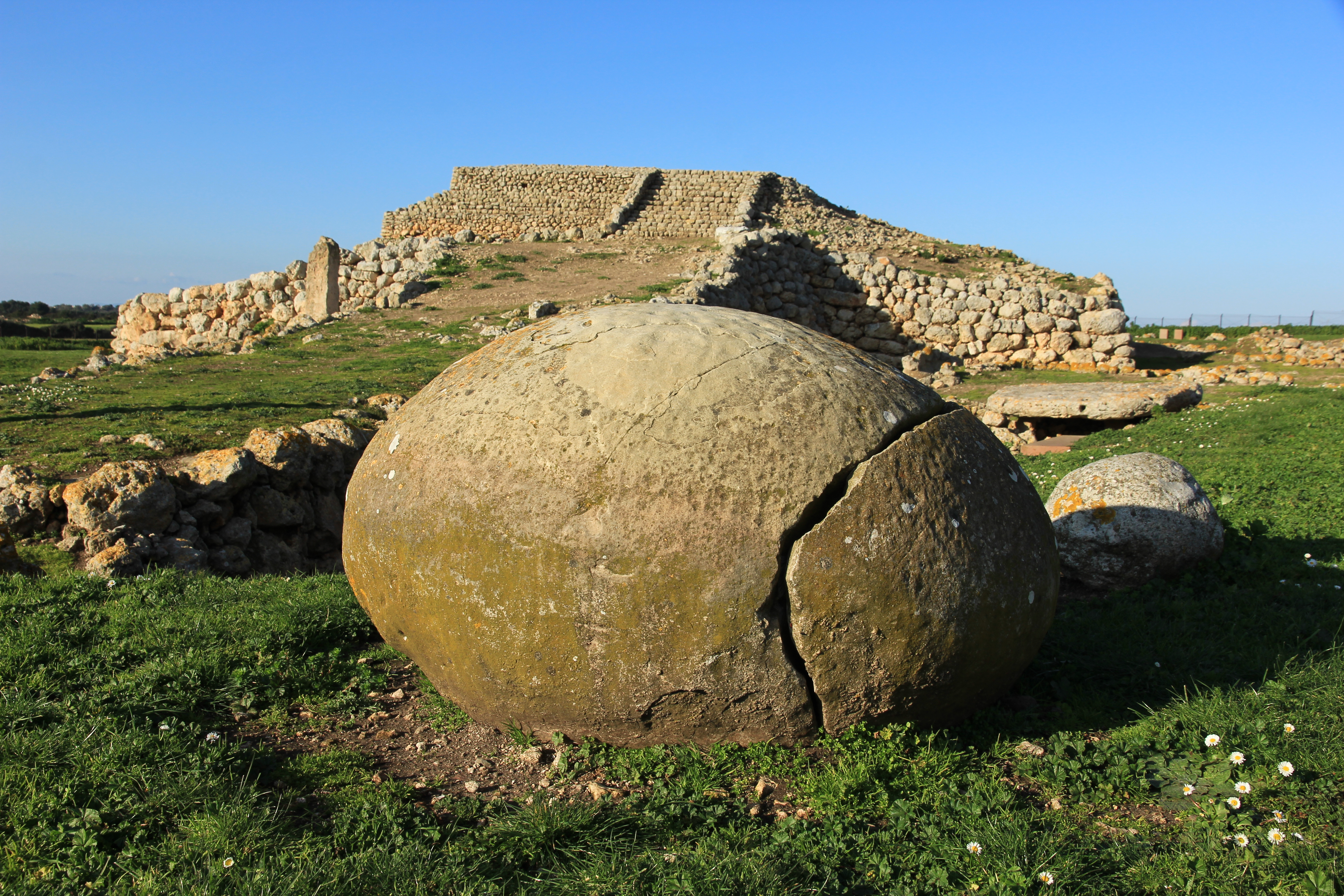
Prehistoric step pyramid of Monte d'Accoddi

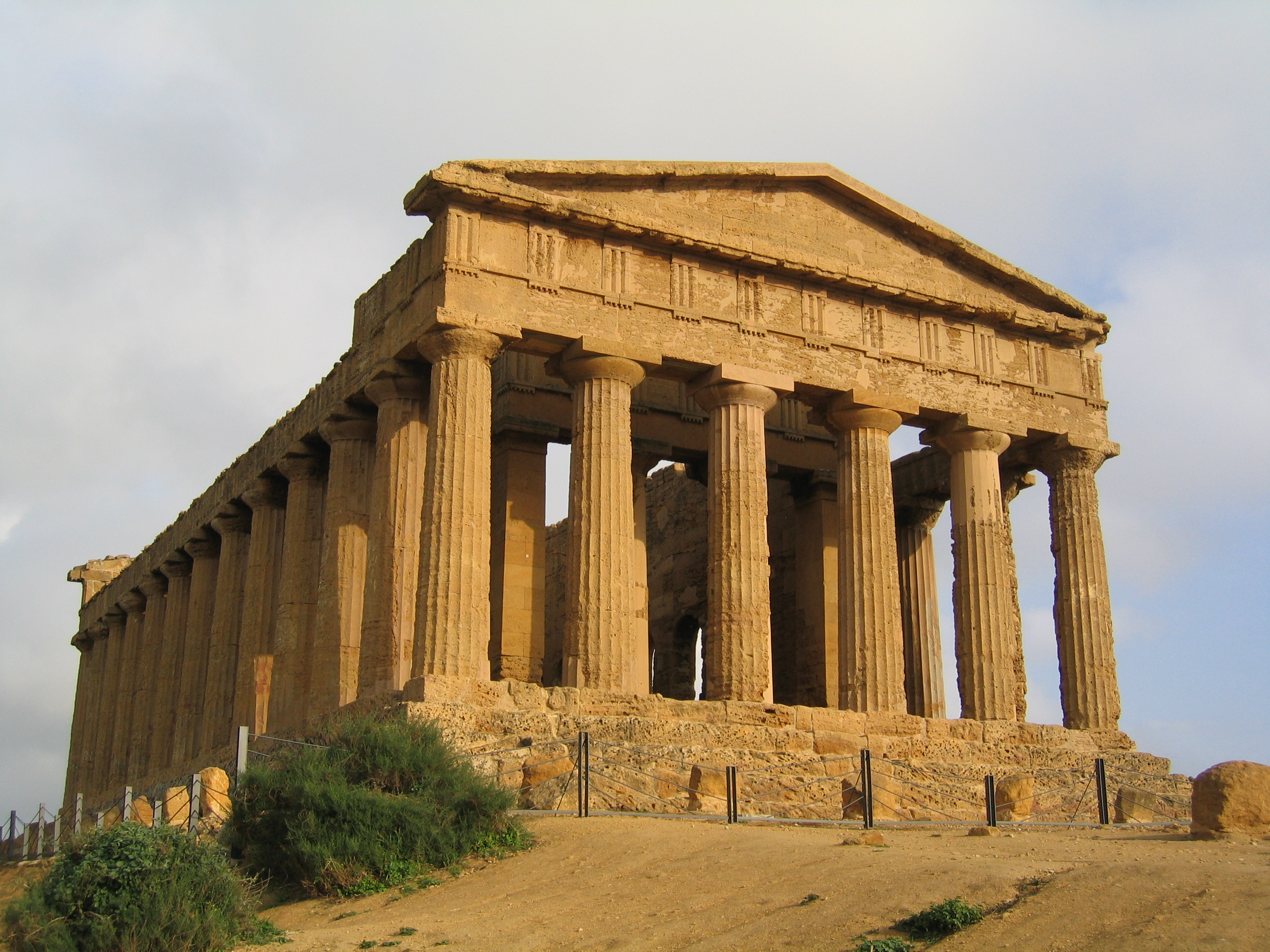
The Greek Temple of Concordia, Valle dei Templi, Agrigento, Sicily

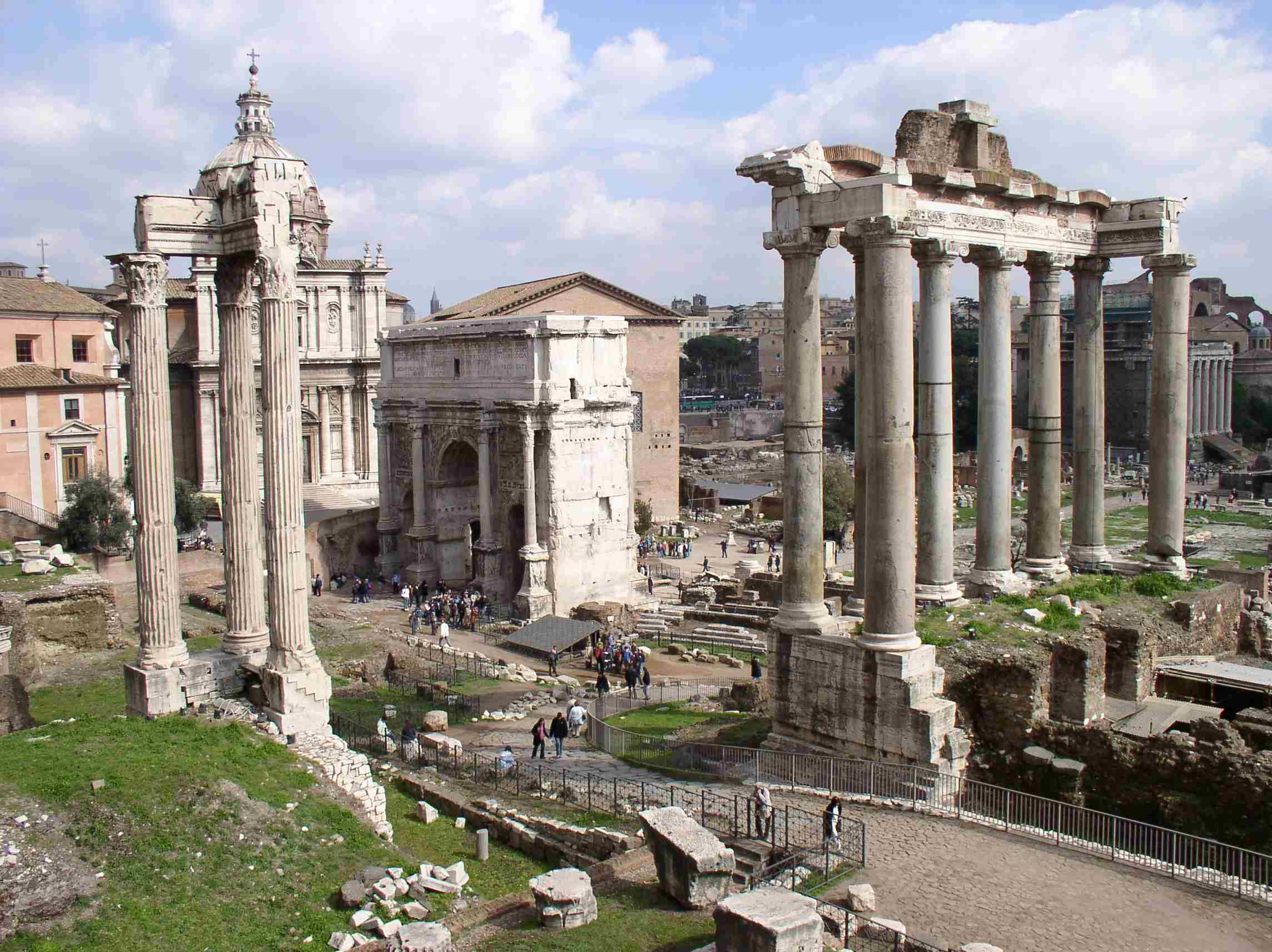
The Roman Forum, the commercial, cultural, and political center of the city at the time of the Roman Republic

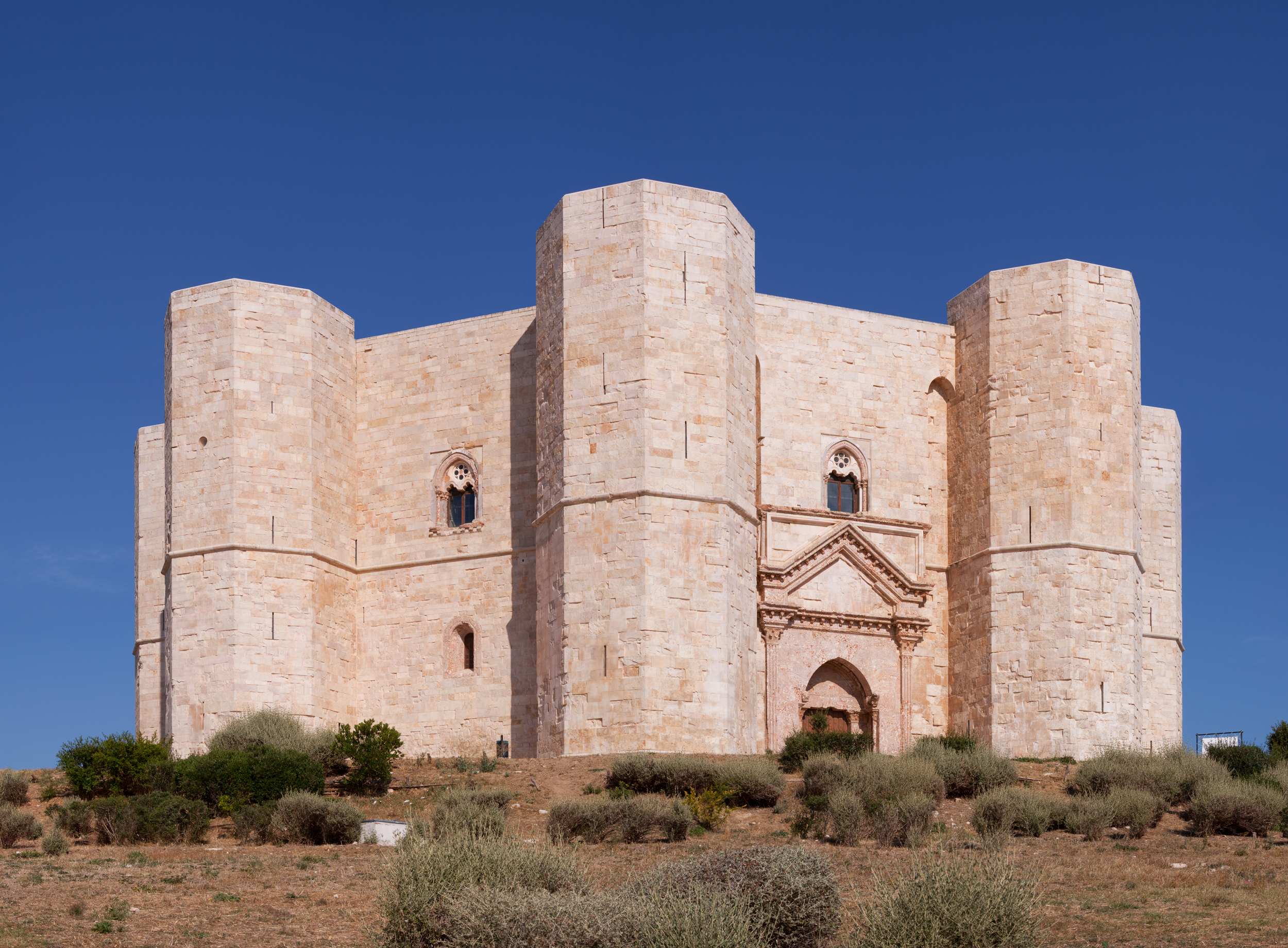
Castel del Monte, a 13th-century citadel and castle situated on a hill in Andria

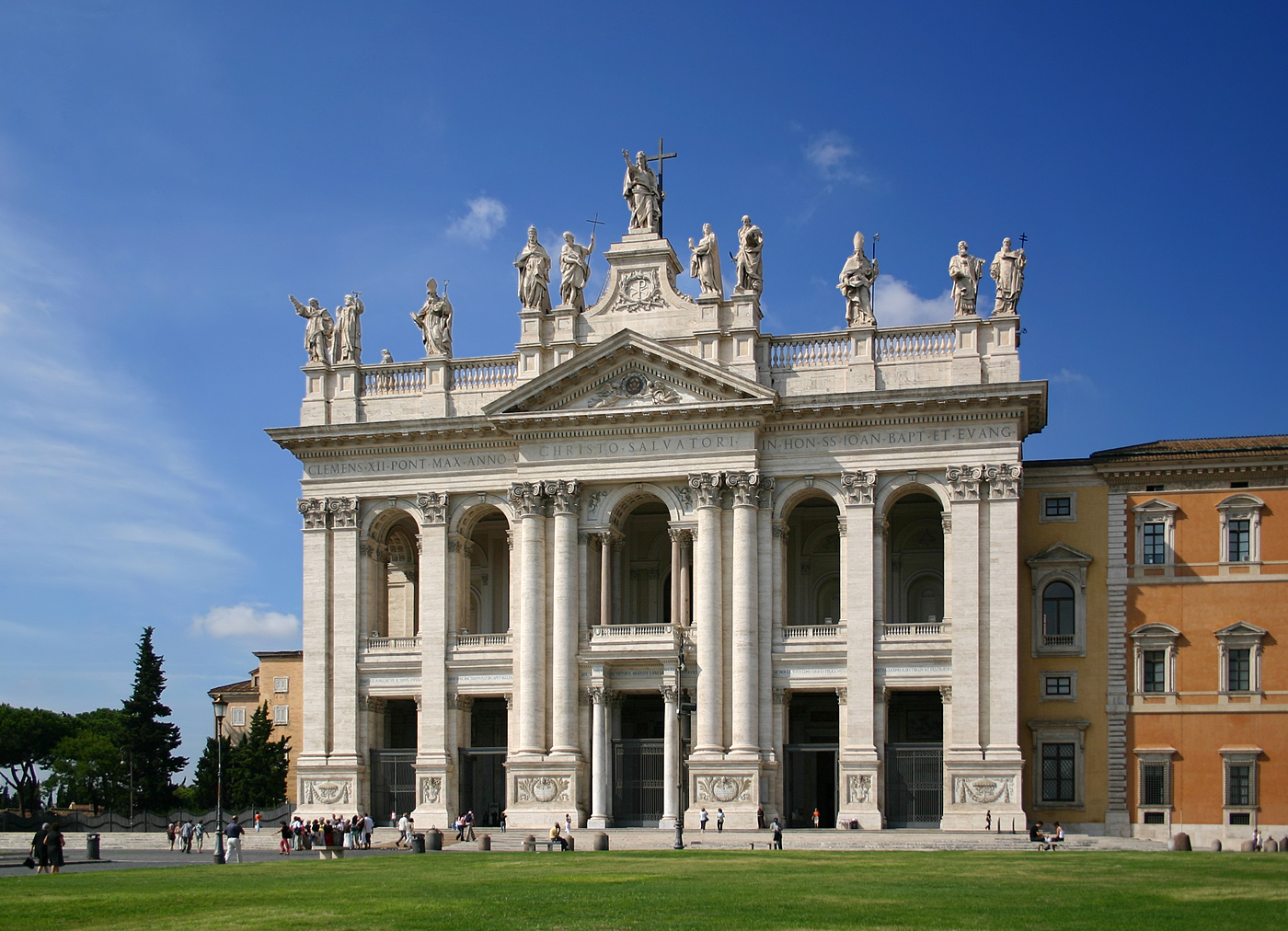
Archbasilica of St. John Lateran

=== By period ===
- Prehistoric Italy
  - Neolithic Italy
  - Rinaldone culture
  - Apennine culture
  - Canegrate culture
  - Terramare culture
  - Golasecca culture
  - Latial culture
  - Villanovan culture
- Ancient peoples of Italy
  - Cisalpine Gaul
  - Etruscan civilization
  - Italic peoples
  - Ligures
  - Nuragic civilization
  - Magna Graecia (8th–3rd centuries BC)
- Italy during Roman times (8th century BC – 6th century AD)
  - Roman Kingdom
  - Roman Republic
  - Roman Empire
  - Roman Italy
- Italy in the Middle Ages (6th–14th centuries)
  - Ostrogothic Kingdom
  - Byzantine Italy
  - Kingdom of the Lombards
  - Papal States (756 – 1870)
  - Holy Roman Empire
    - Lombard League
  - Sardinian medieval kingdoms
  - Arabs
  - Normans
    - Kingdom of Sicily (founded in 1130)
  - Guelphs and Ghibellines
  - Kingdom of Naples (founded in 1282)
- Italian city-states
  - Republic of Florence (followed by the Grand Duchy of Tuscany)
  - Republic of Siena
  - Duchy of Milan
  - Maritime republics
- Duchy of Savoy
- Italian Renaissance (14th–16th centuries)
  - Italian Wars (1494–1559)
- History of early modern Italy
  - Kingdom of Italy (Napoleonic)
  - Kingdom of Lombardy–Venetia
  - Kingdom of the Two Sicilies
- Italian unification (1814 –1861)
- Italian irredentism
- History of the Kingdom of Italy (1861–1946)
  - Kingdom of Italy
  - Italian Colonial Empire
  - Military history of Italy during World War I
  - Fascist Italy
    - Italian Racial Laws
  - Military history of Italy during World War II
  - Fall of the Fascist regime in Italy
  - Italian resistance movement
  - Italian Social Republic
  - Italian Civil War
- History of the Italian Republic (1946 – present)
  - 1946 Italian institutional referendum
  - Italian economic miracle
  - Years of Lead (Italy)
  - Mani pulite
  - COVID-19 pandemic in Italy

=== By city ===
- History of Florence
- History of Milan
- History of Naples
- History of Rome
- History of Palermo
- History of Venice

=== By region ===
- History of Tuscany
- History of Sicily

=== By subject ===
- Economic history of Italy
- Genetic history of Italy
- Historical states of Italy
- Military history of Italy
  - Military history of Italy during World War I
  - Military history of Italy during World War II
- Music history of Italy
- History of coins in Italy
- History of Italian citizenship
- History of Italian culture (1700s)
- History of Italian fashion
- History of Italian flags
  - Flags of Napoleonic Italy
- History of rail transport in Italy
- History of Roman Catholicism in Italy
- History of the Jews in Italy
- LGBT history in Italy
- Name of Italy
- Postage stamps and postal history of Italy

==== Cultural history ====
- Trecento
- Quattrocento
- Cinquecento
- Seicento
- Settecento

== Culture of Italy ==
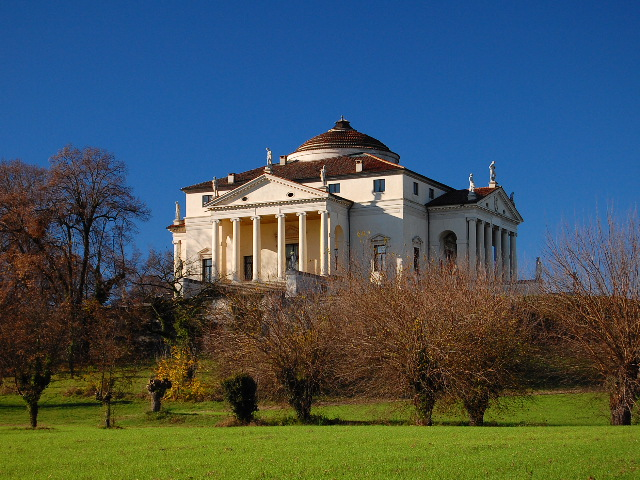
Villa Capra "La Rotonda", a famous example of Palladian architecture

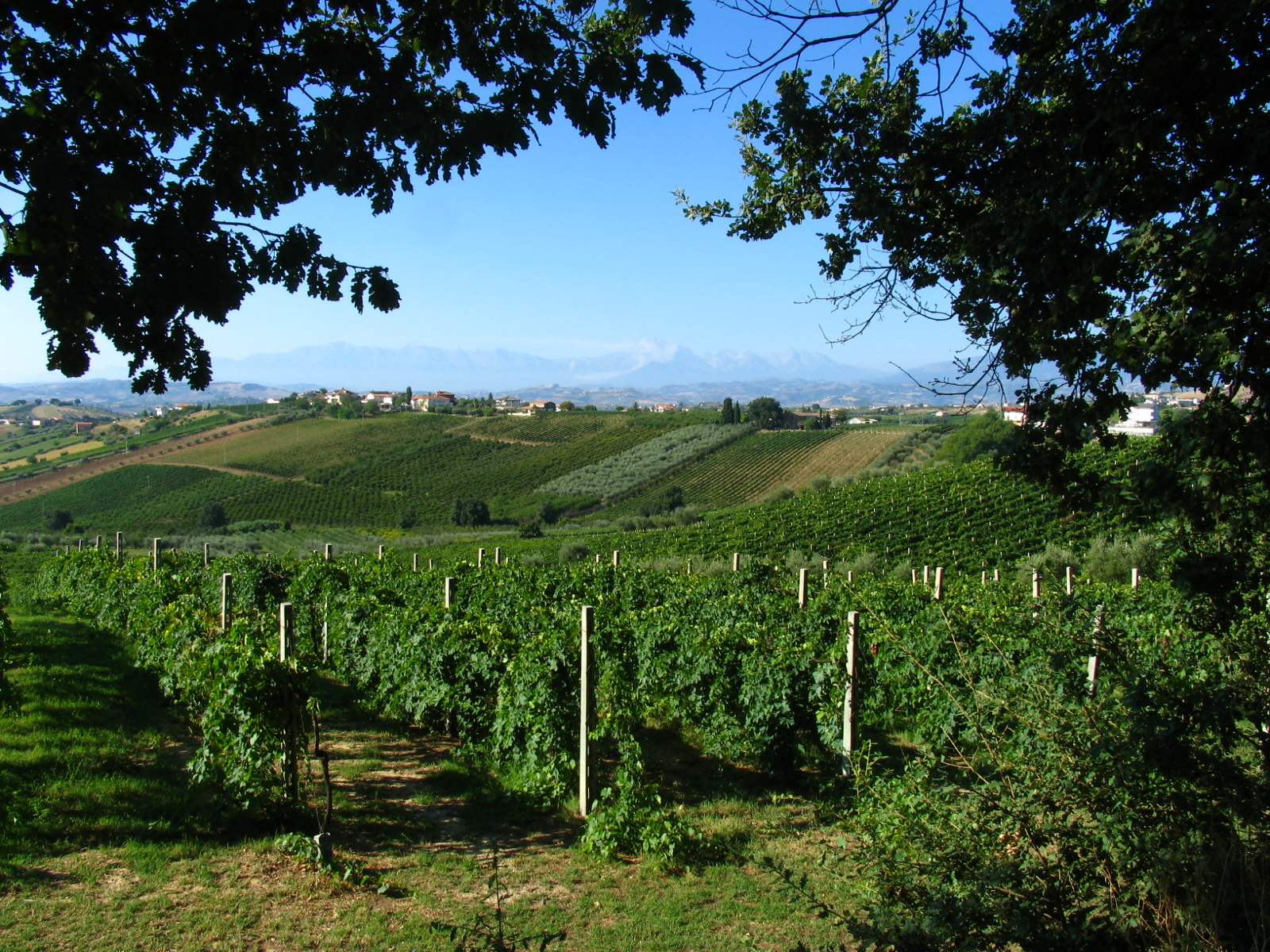
A typical Italian vineyard scene, with vines growing together with olive trees

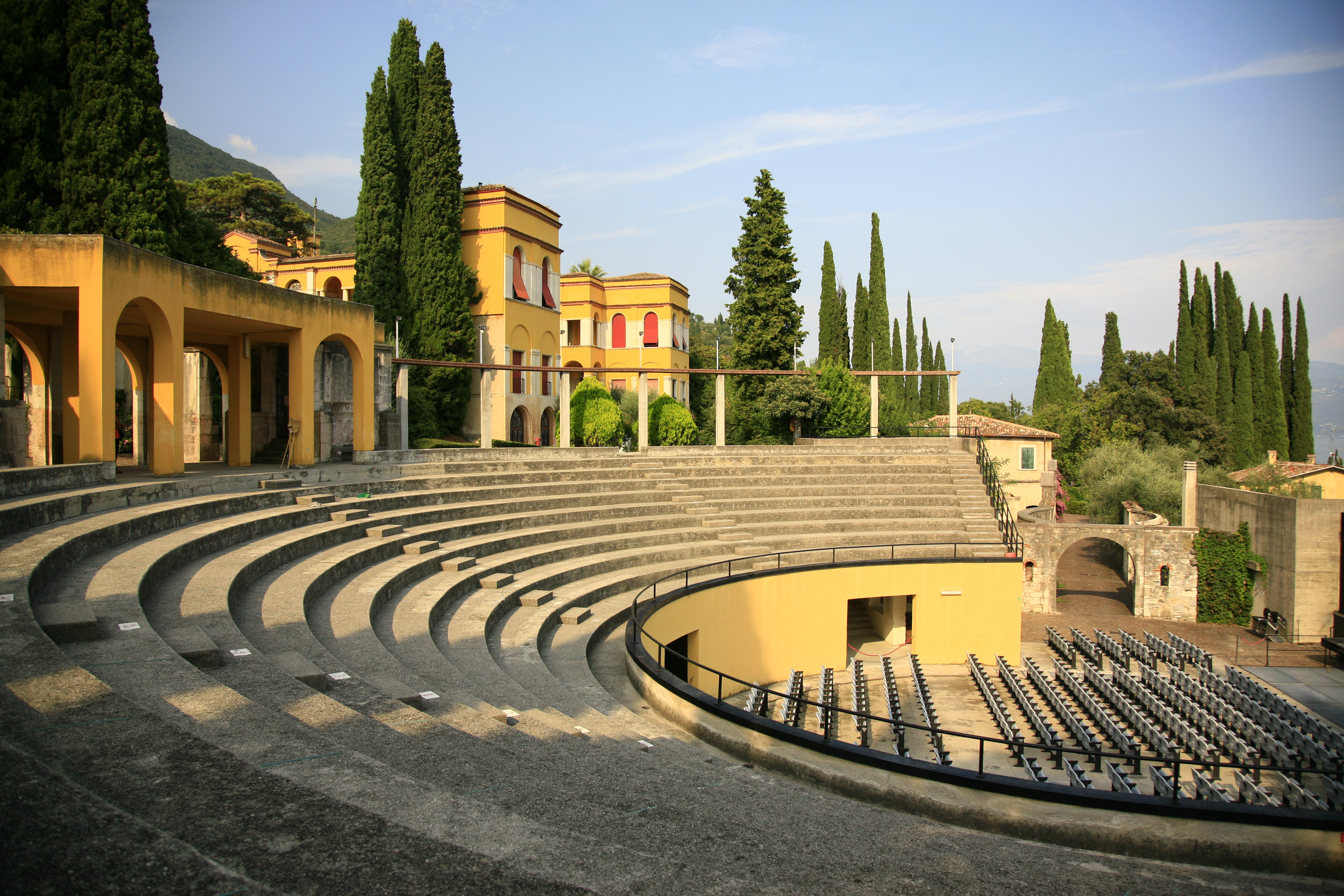
Vittoriale degli Italiani, the amphitheatre

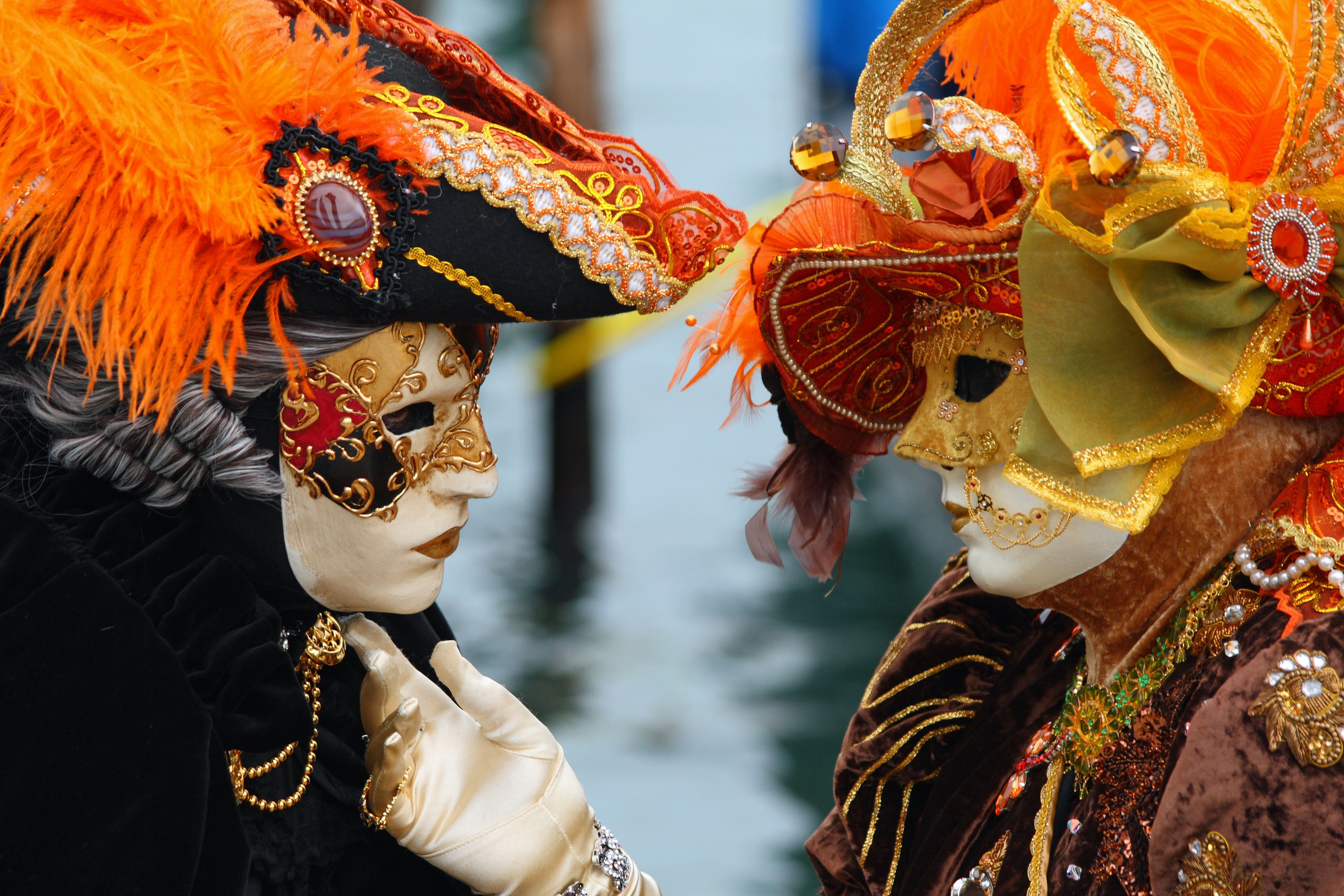
Masks at the Carnival of Venice

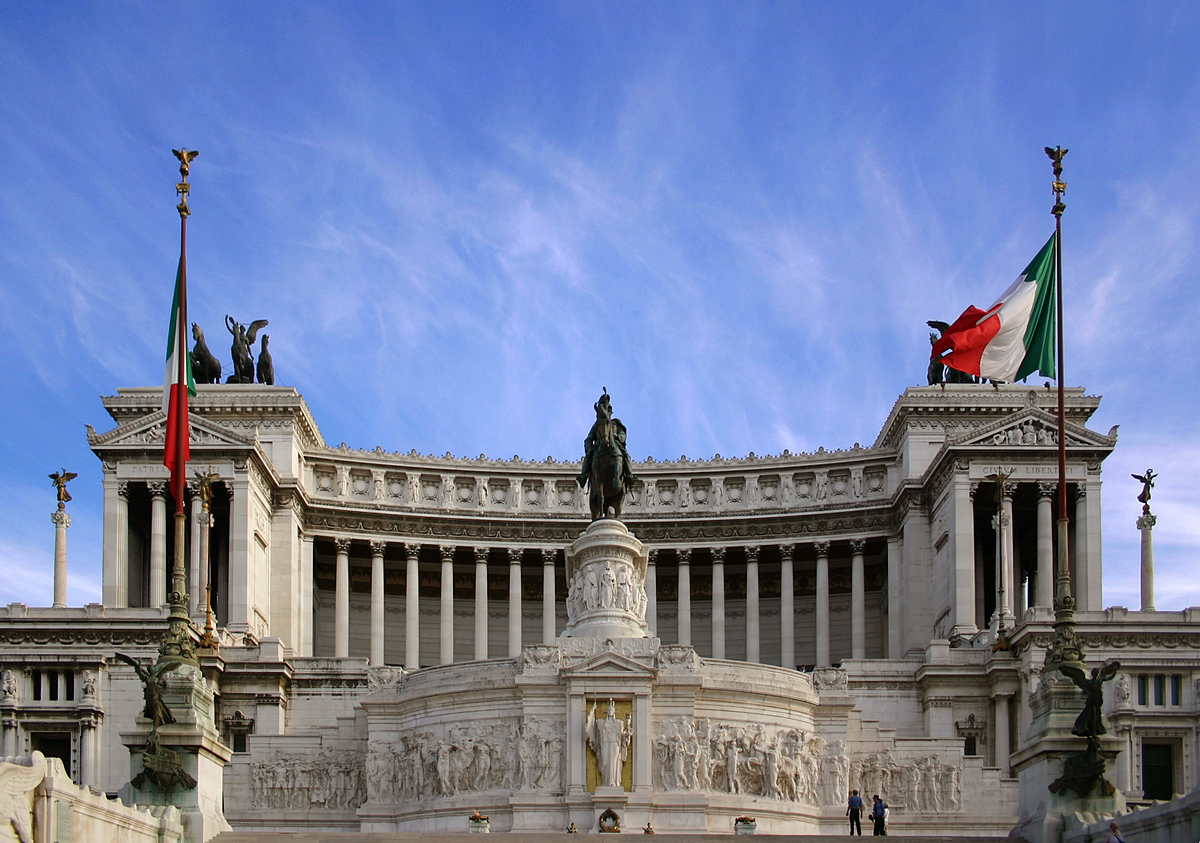
The flag of Italy flying at Victor Emmanuel II Monument in Rome, a national monument celebrating the first king of the unified country, and resting place of the Italian Unknown Soldier since the end of World War I. It was inaugurated in 1911, on the occasion of the 50th Anniversary of the Unification of Italy.

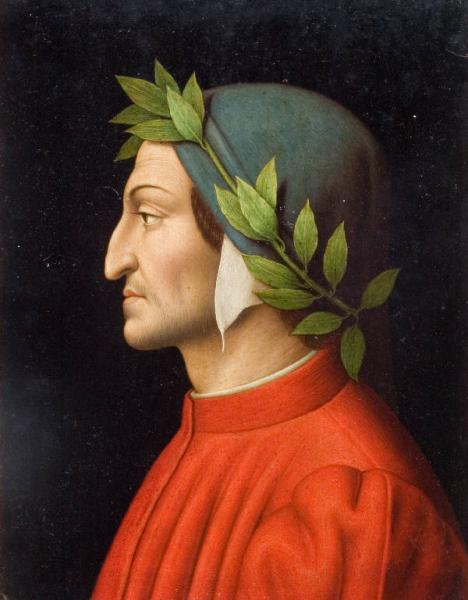
Portrait of Dante Alighieri, one of the greatest poets of the Middle Ages. His epic poem The Divine Comedy ranks among the finest works of world literature.

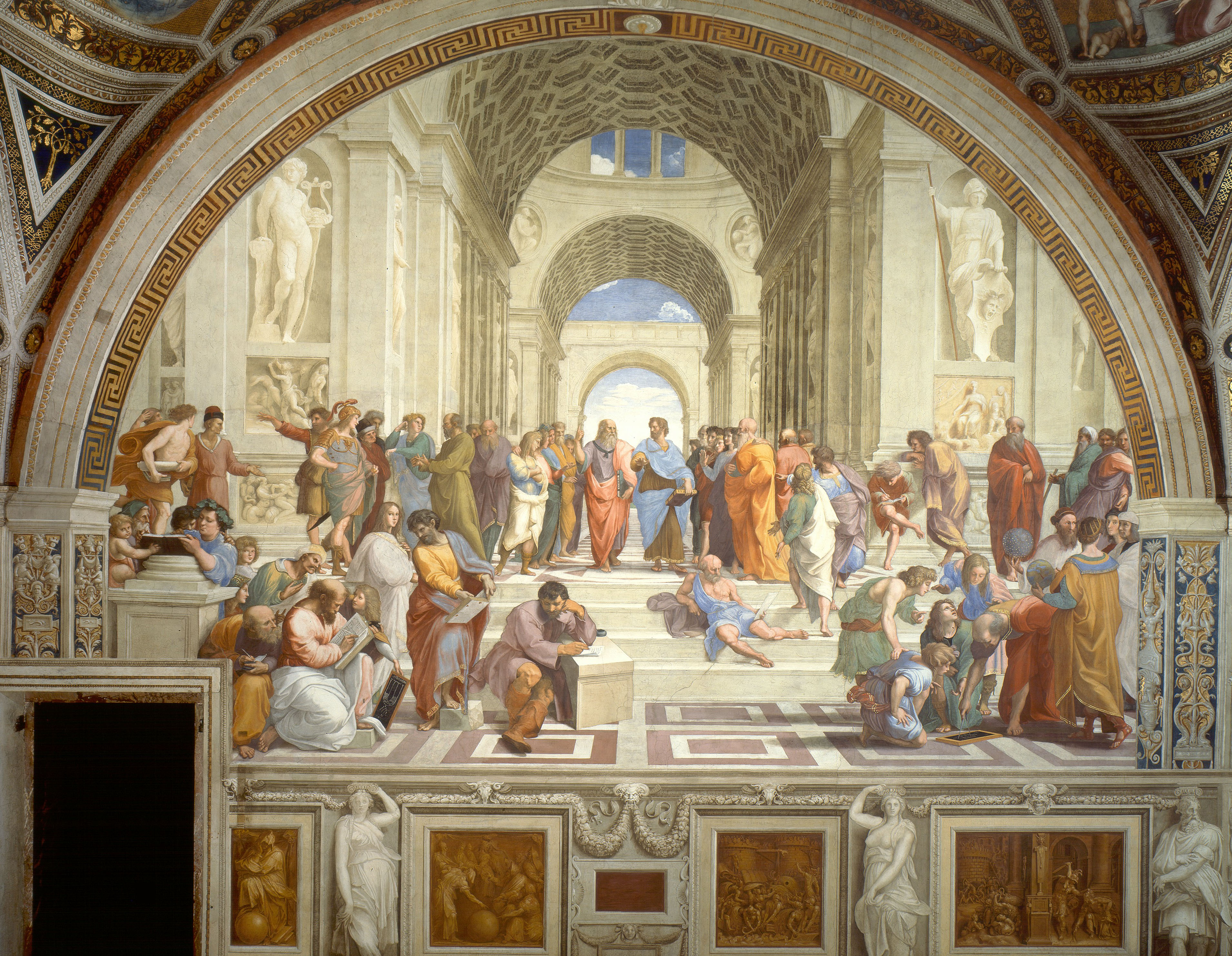
The School of Athens, a famous fresco by the Italian Renaissance artist Raphael

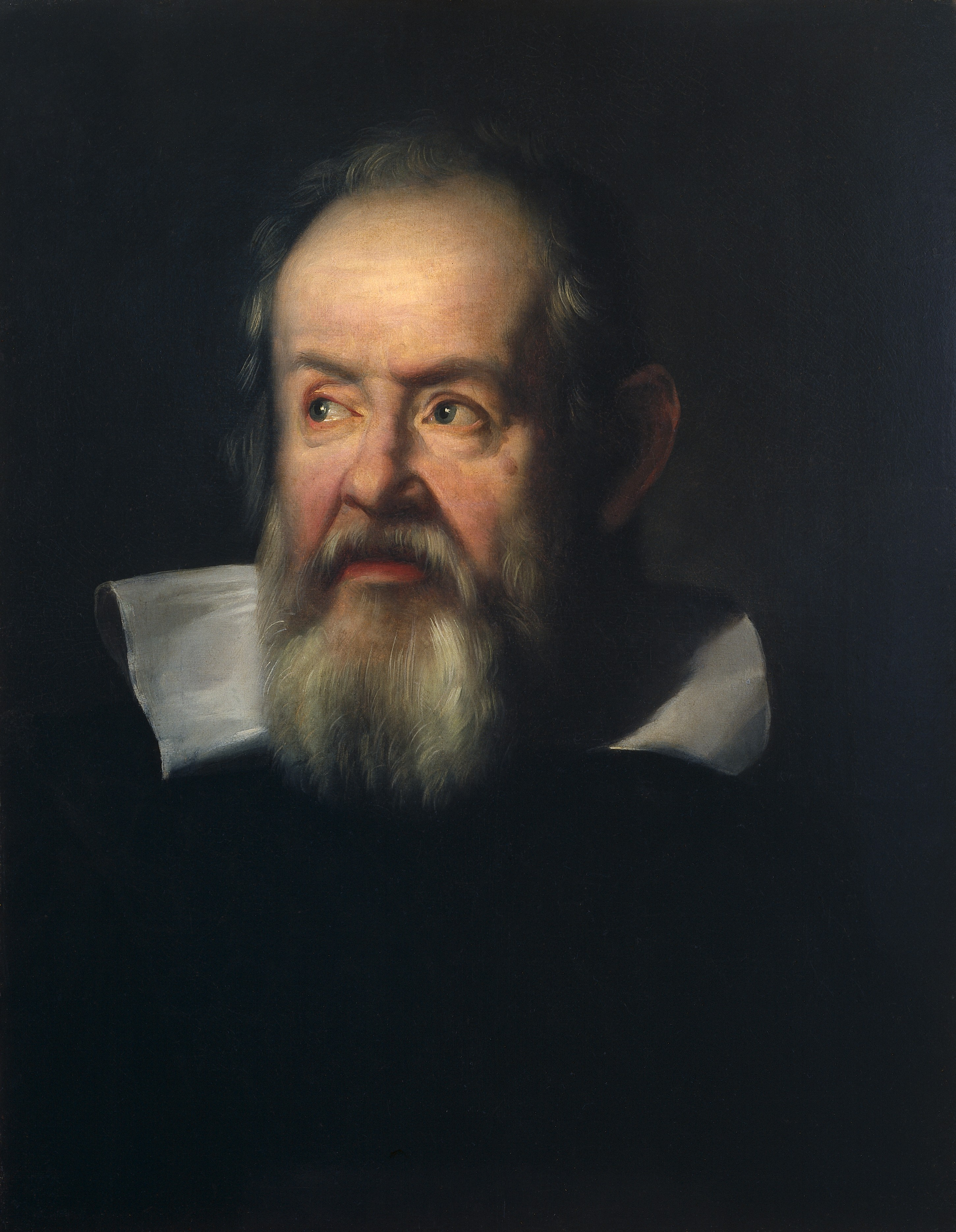
Portrait of Galileo Galilei, considered the "father" of observational astronomy, modern physics, the scientific method, and modern science

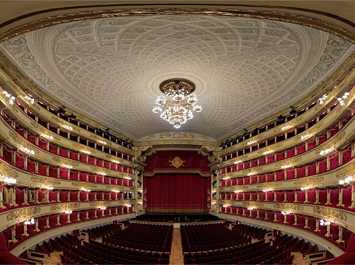
The auditorium of the Teatro alla Scala in Milan, the leading opera and ballet theatre in Italy

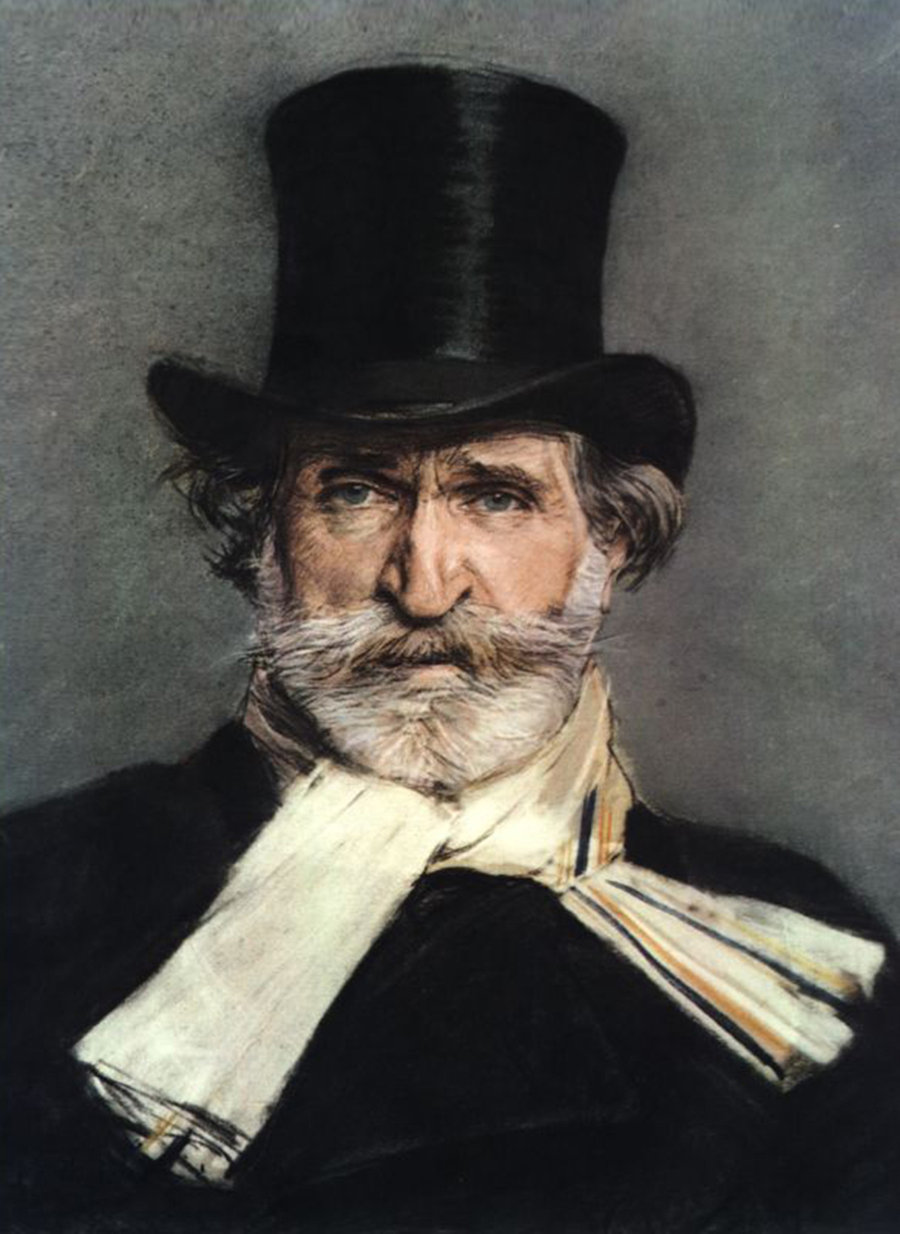
Giuseppe Verdi, one of Italy's greatest opera composers, portrait by Giovanni Boldini

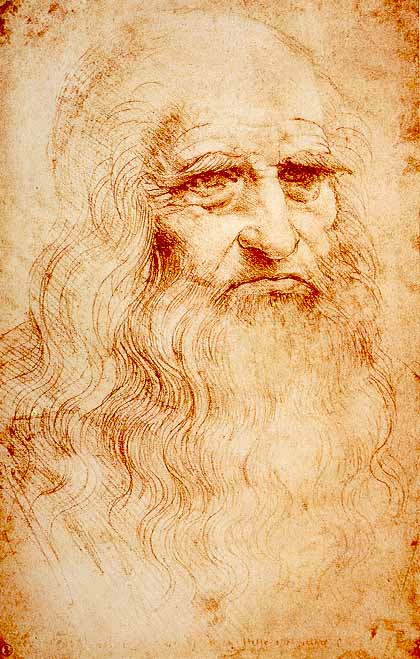
Leonardo da Vinci, a polymath of the High Renaissance who was active as a painter, draughtsman, engineer, scientist, theorist, sculptor, and architect

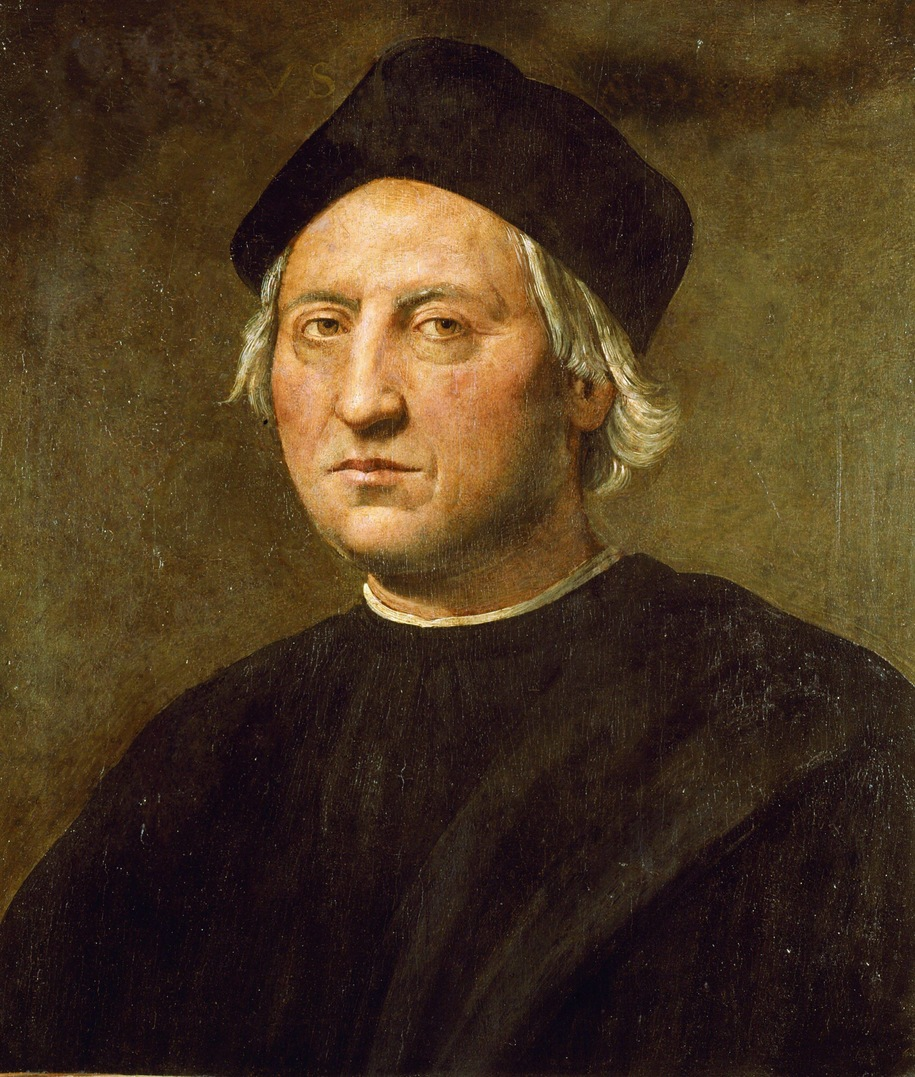
Portrait of Christopher Columbus (Italian: Cristoforo Colombo) leads an expedition to the New World, 1492. His voyages are celebrated as the discovery of the Americas from a European perspective, and they opened a new era in the history of humankind and sustained contact between the two worlds.

Culture of Italy

- Culture of Rome
- Architecture of Italy
  - Ancient Roman architecture
  - Italian Gothic architecture
    - Venetian Gothic architecture
  - Italian Renaissance and Mannerist architecture
    - Palladian architecture
  - Italian Baroque architecture
    - Sicilian Baroque
  - Italian Neoclassical architecture
    - Neoclassical architecture in Milan
  - Italian modern and contemporary architecture
    - Fascist architecture
  - North-Western Italian architecture
  - List of Italian architects
  - List of castles in Italy
  - List of cathedrals in Italy
  - List of libraries in Italy
  - List of palaces in Italy
- Cuisine of Italy
  - Beer in Italy
  - Italian food products
  - Italian meal structure
  - Italian wine
    - Veneto wine
- Gardens in Italy
  - Italian garden
- Italian nationalism
- Italophilia
- Languages of Italy
  - Central Italian
  - Geographical distribution of Italian speakers
  - Italian language
  - Regional Italian
- Media in Italy
  - Magazines in Italy
  - Newspapers in Italy
  - Radio in Italy
  - Television in Italy
- Mythology of Italy
- Monuments of Italy
  - Colosseum
  - Leaning Tower of Pisa
  - St Mark's Basilica
- Museums in Italy
- National symbols of Italy
  - Coat of arms of Italy
  - Cockade of Italy
  - Flag of Italy
    - Flags of regions of Italy
  - National anthem of Italy
  - National colours of Italy
  - National personification of Italy
- Philosophy
  - Italian idealism
- Public holidays in Italy
  - Ferragosto
  - Festa della Repubblica
  - Liberation Day (Italy)
- Traditions of Italy
  - Carnival of Venice
  - Feast of San Gennaro
  - Palio di Siena
- Units of measurement
- World Heritage Sites in Italy (See also Transboundary sites)

=== Art in Italy ===
- Art in Italy
  - Etruscan art
  - Roman art
  - Renaissance painting
  - Baroque art
  - Rococo art
  - Neoclassical and 19th-century art
  - Modern and contemporary art
    - Futurism
    - Metaphysical art
    - Novecento Italiano
    - Spatialism
    - Arte Povera
    - Transavantgarde
- Italian ballet
- Cinema of Italy
  - Italian futurism in cinema
  - Italian neorealism
- Italian design
- Italian fashion
- Literature of Italy
  - Italian poetry
  - Sicilian School
  - Dolce Stil Novo
  - Marinism
  - Pontifical Academy of Arcadia
  - Venetian literature
  - Verismo (literature)
  - Western Lombard literature
- Folklore of Italy
  - Italian folk dance
  - Italian folk music
- Music of Italy
  - Italian classical music
  - Italian composers
  - Italian opera
  - Italian popular music
  - Mozart in Italy
  - Music history of Italy
  - Music media in Italy
  - Music of the Trecento
- Sculpture of Italy
- Theatre in Italy
  - Commedia dell'arte

=== People in Italy ===
- Italians
  - People from Italy
    - Italian actors
    - Italian actresses
    - Italian architects
    - Italian women artists
    - Italian chefs
    - child actors
    - Italian classical composers
    - Italian comedians
    - Italian composers
    - Italian designers
    - Italian explorers
    - Italian film directors
    - Italian inventors
    - Italian journalists
    - Italian lawyers
    - Italian mathematicians
    - Italian Nobel laureates
    - Italian painters
    - Italian philosophers
    - Italian-language poets
    - Italian politicians
    - Italian scientists
    - Italian women writers
    - Italian writers
- Italian diaspora
- Immigration to Italy
- Monarchy of Italy
- Nobility of Italy
  - Papal nobility
- Social class in Italy
- Women in Italy

==== Ethnic groups in Italy ====
- Algerians in Italy
- Arabs in Italy
- Arbëreshë people
- Armenians in Italy
- Australians in Italy
- Bangladeshis in Italy
- Bulgarians in Italy
- Cape Verdeans in Italy
- Chinese people in Italy
- Congolese people in Italy
- Croats of Italy
- Cuban people in Italy
- Dominican people in Italy
- Egyptians in Italy
- Ghanaian people in Italy
- Greeks in Italy
- Indians in Italy
- Moroccans in Italy
- Nepalis in Italy
- Nigerian people in Italy
- Pakistanis in Italy
- Peruvians in Italy
- Romani people in Italy
- Romanians in Italy
- Senegalese people in Italy
- Serbs in Italy
- Somali people in Italy
- Swiss people in Italy
- Sri Lankans in Italy
- Tamils in Italy
- Tunisian people in Italy
- Turks in Italy
- Ukrainians in Italy
- Uruguayans in Italy

=== Religion in Italy ===
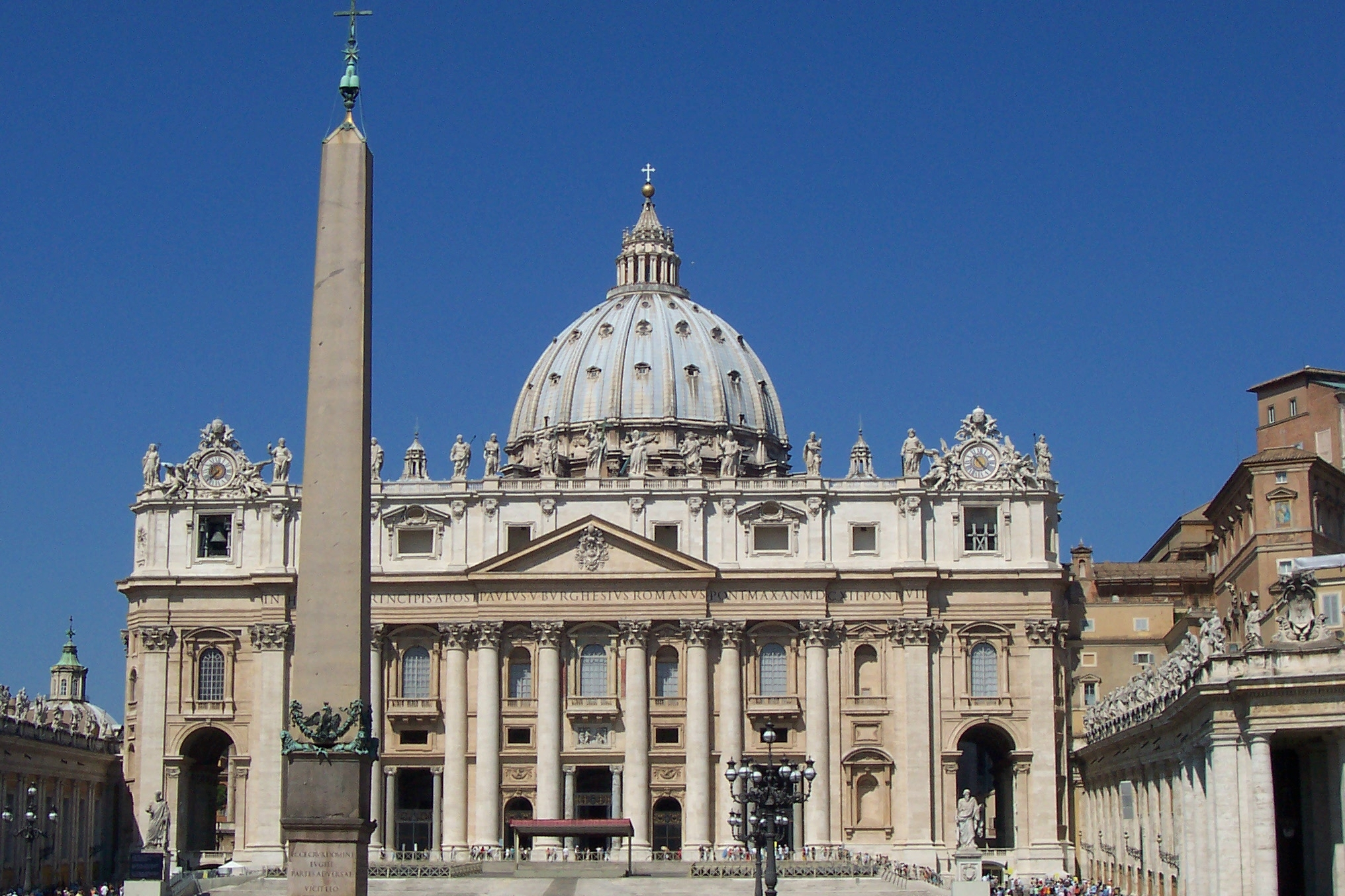
Monumental façade of St. Peter's Basilica in Rome, the world's largest Christian church

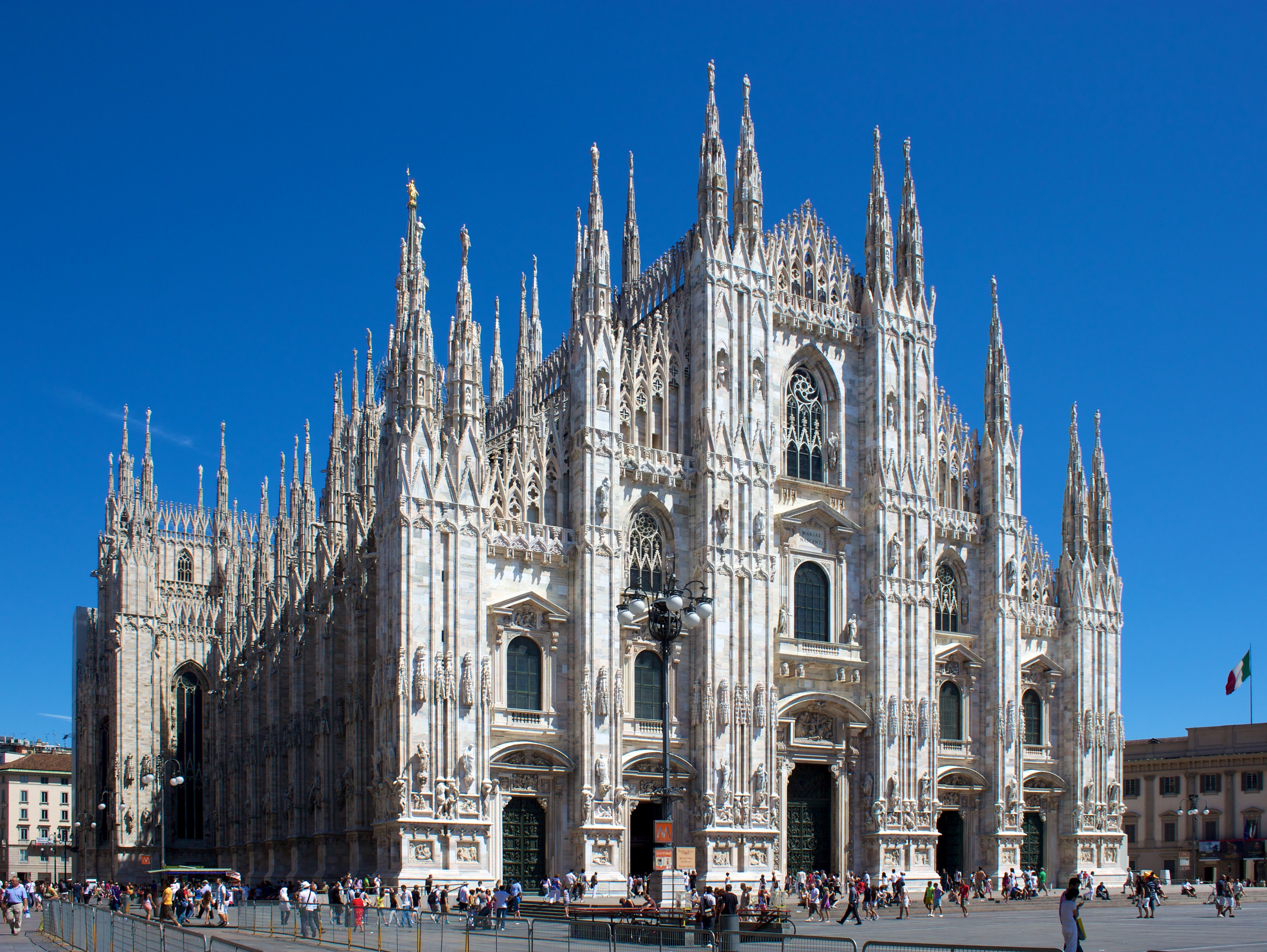
Milan Cathedral, the fourth-largest church in the world

Florence Cathedral: Brunelleschi's Dome, the nave, and Giotto's Campanile as seen from the South

Religion in Italy

- Bahá'í Faith in Italy
- Buddhism in Italy
- Christianity in Italy
  - Apostolic Church in Italy
  - Assemblies of God in Italy
  - Baptist Evangelical Christian Union of Italy
  - Catholic Church in Italy
  - Eastern Orthodoxy in Italy
    - Greek Orthodox Archdiocese of Italy
    - Orthodox Church in Italy
  - Evangelical Reformed Baptist Churches in Italy
  - Federation of Evangelical Churches in Italy
  - List of Catholic dioceses in Italy
  - Lutheran Evangelical Church in Italy
  - Methodist Evangelical Church in Italy
  - Protestantism in Italy
    - Waldensian Evangelical Church
  - Old Catholic Church in Italy
  - Oriental Orthodoxy in Italy
- Hinduism in Italy
- Islam in Italy
- Judaism in Italy
- Sikhism in Italy
- Taoist Church of Italy

=== Sport in Italy ===
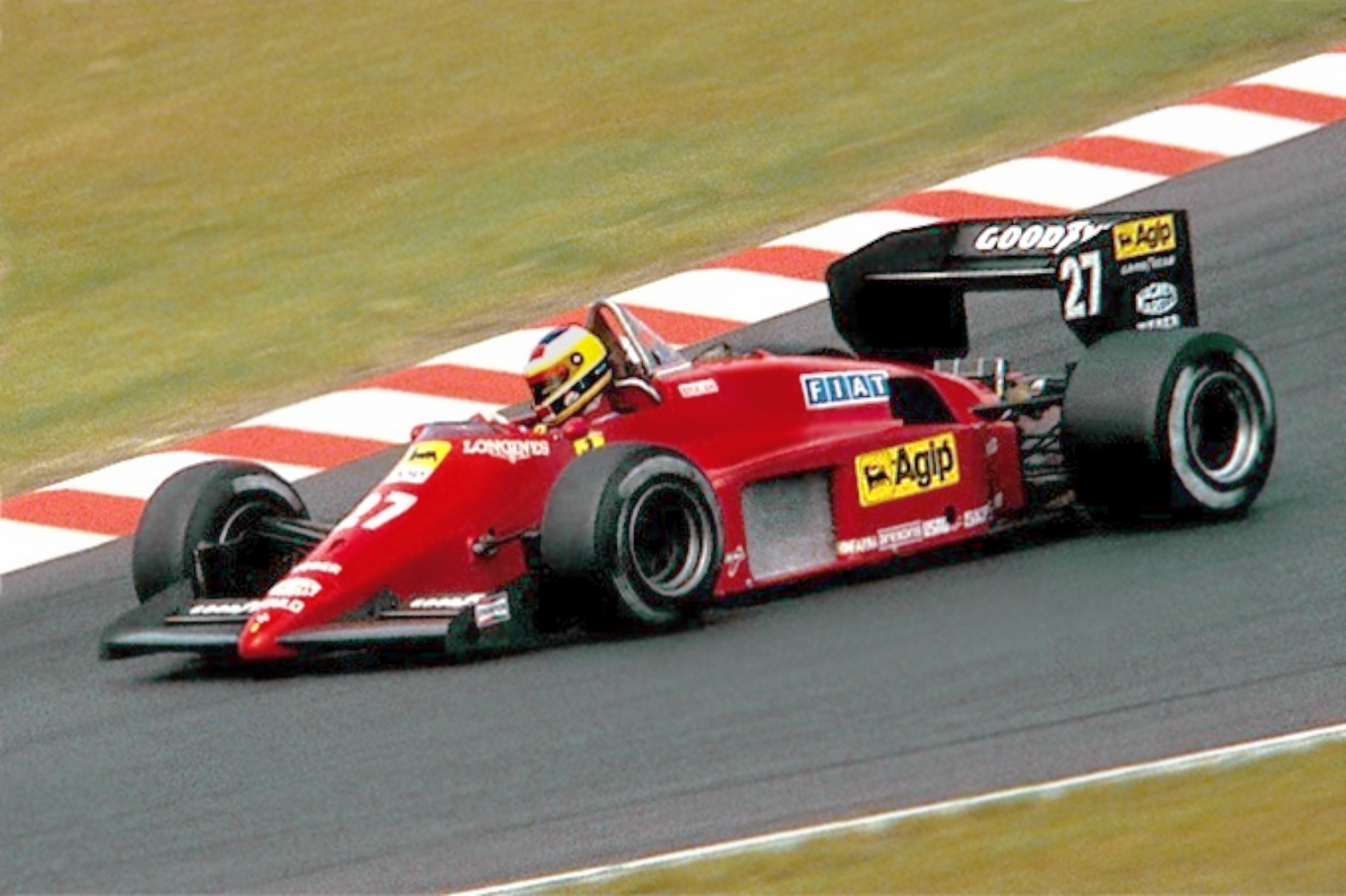
Michele Alboreto, won the 1985 German Grand Prix for Ferrari

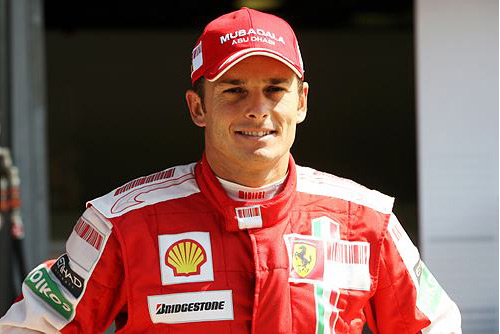
Giancarlo Fisichella, the most recent Italian racing driver to win a Formula One Grand Prix

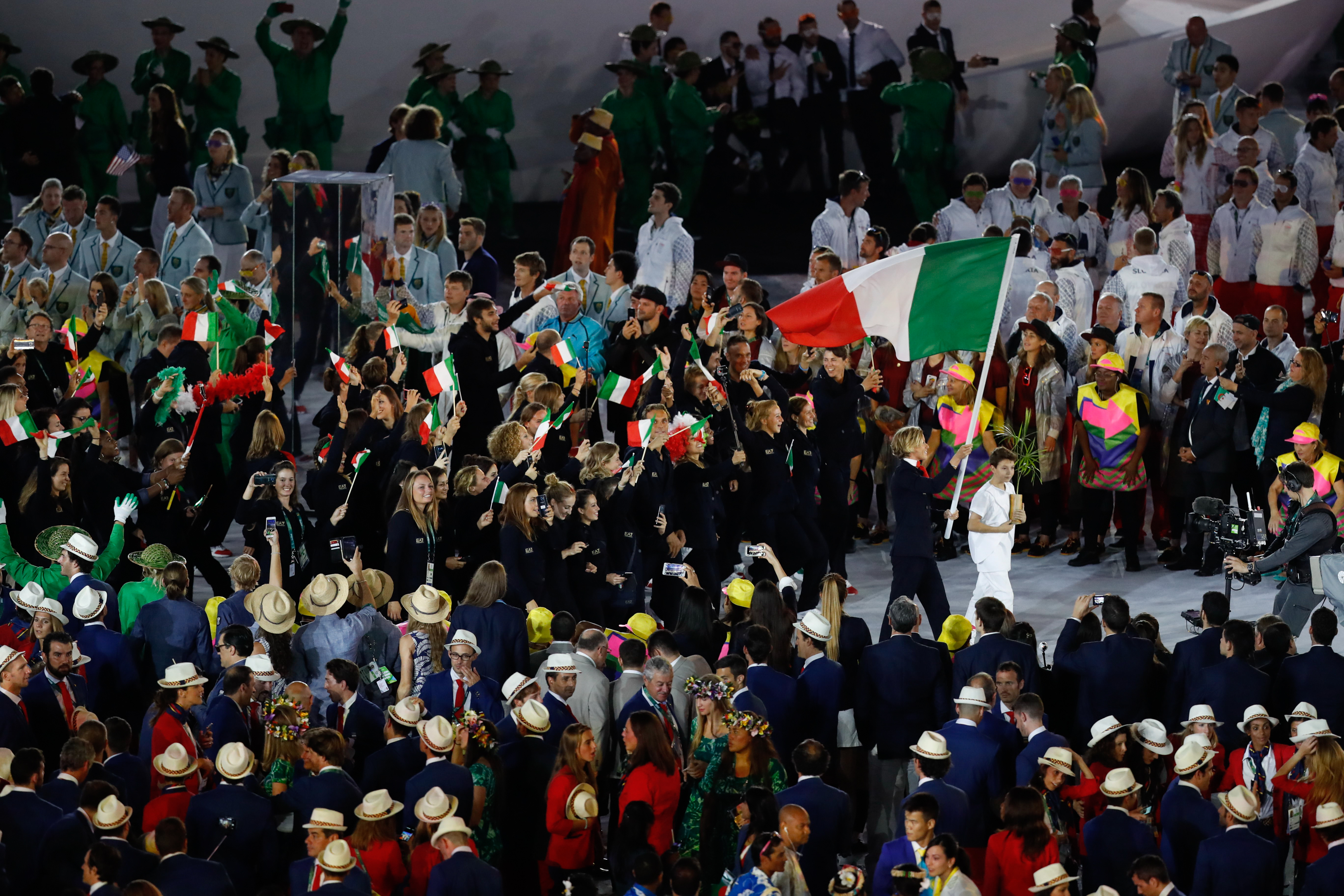
Italy at the 2016 Summer Olympics

Sport in Italy

- American football
  - Italian Football League
- Athletics in Italy
- Auto racing
  - Italian Grand Prix
  - Speedway Grand Prix of Italy
- Baseball
  - Italian Baseball League
  - Italy national baseball team
- Basketball
  - Italian basketball league system
  - Italian Basketball Federation
  - Lega Basket Serie A
    - Serie A2 (basketball)
      - Serie B Basket
  - Lega Basket Femminile
    - Serie A2 (women's basketball)
  - Italy men's national basketball team
    - Italy men's national under-20 basketball team
    - Italy men's national under-19 basketball team
    - Italy men's national under-17 basketball team
  - Italy women's national 3x3 team
  - Italy women's national basketball team
  - Italy women's national 3x3 team
- Cricket
  - Italian national cricket team
- Cycling
  - Italy national cycling team
  - Italian Cycling Federation
  - Italian records in track cycling
- Futsal in Italy
  - Italy national futsal team
- Golf
  - Italian Open
- Ice hockey in Italy
  - Italian Ice Sports Federation
  - Italy men's national ice hockey team
- Italy at the Olympics
  - Italian National Olympic Committee
- Rugby football
  - Rugby union in Italy
  - Rugby league in Italy
- Tennis in Italy
  - Italian Open
- Volleyball
  - Italian Volleyball League

==== Basketball in Italy ====
- Italian basketball league system
- Italian Basketball Federation
- Lega Basket Serie A
  - Serie A2 (basketball)
    - Serie B Basket
- Italy men's national basketball team
  - Italy men's national under-20 basketball team
  - Italy men's national under-19 basketball team
  - Italy men's national under-17 basketball team
- Italy women's national 3x3 team
- Italy women's national basketball team
- Italy women's national 3x3 team
- Lega Basket Femminile
  - Serie A2 (women's basketball)

==== Football in Italy ====
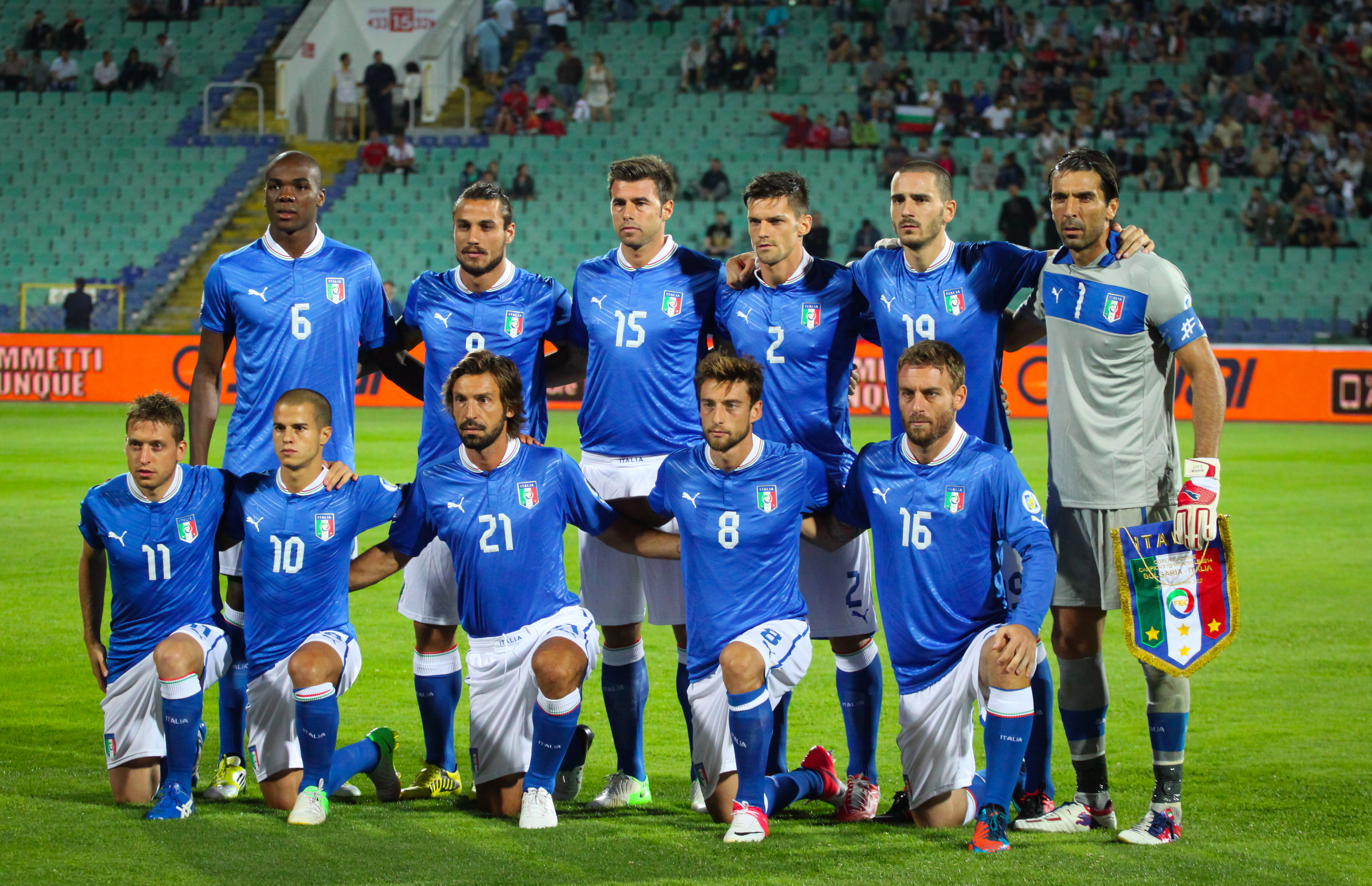
The Italy national football team, called Azzurri or squadra azzurra for their blue shirts, are the second-most successful national team in the world.

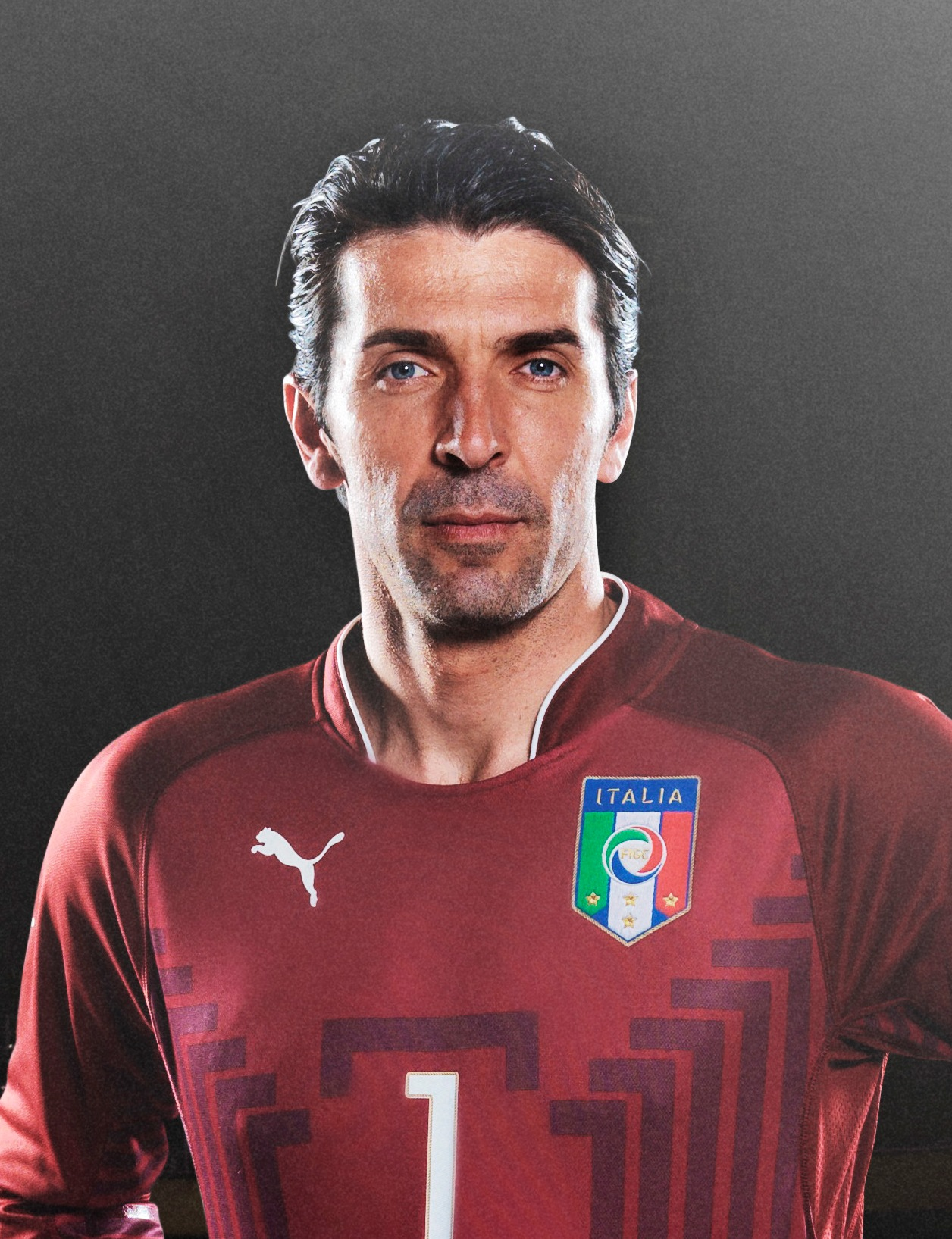
Goalkeeper Gianluigi Buffon is the most capped player in the history of football in Italy with 171 caps.

Football in Italy

- Association football league system in Italy note: superseded by Italian football league system
  - Italian Football Federation
  - Serie A
    - Lega Nazionale Professionisti Serie A
  - Serie B
    - Lega Nazionale Professionisti Serie B
  - Lega Pro
- Football derbies in Italy
- Football records in Italy
- Italian Football Hall of Fame
- List of football clubs in Italy
- List of football stadiums in Italy
- Italy national football team
  - Italy national under-21 football team
  - Italy national under-20 football team
  - Italy national under-19 football team
  - Italy national under-17 football team
  - Italy women's national football team
- Supercoppa Italiana

==== Other sports popular in Italy ====
- Combat sports
  - Italian school of swordsmanship
  - Italy national fencing team
- Equestrian sports
  - Italian flat horse races
  - Italian jump horse races
- Motorcycle racing
- Roller hockey
- Water sports
  - Italian Swimming Federation
  - Italy men's national water polo team
  - Italy women's national water polo team
- Winter sports
  - Italy national alpine ski team

== Economy and infrastructure of Italy ==
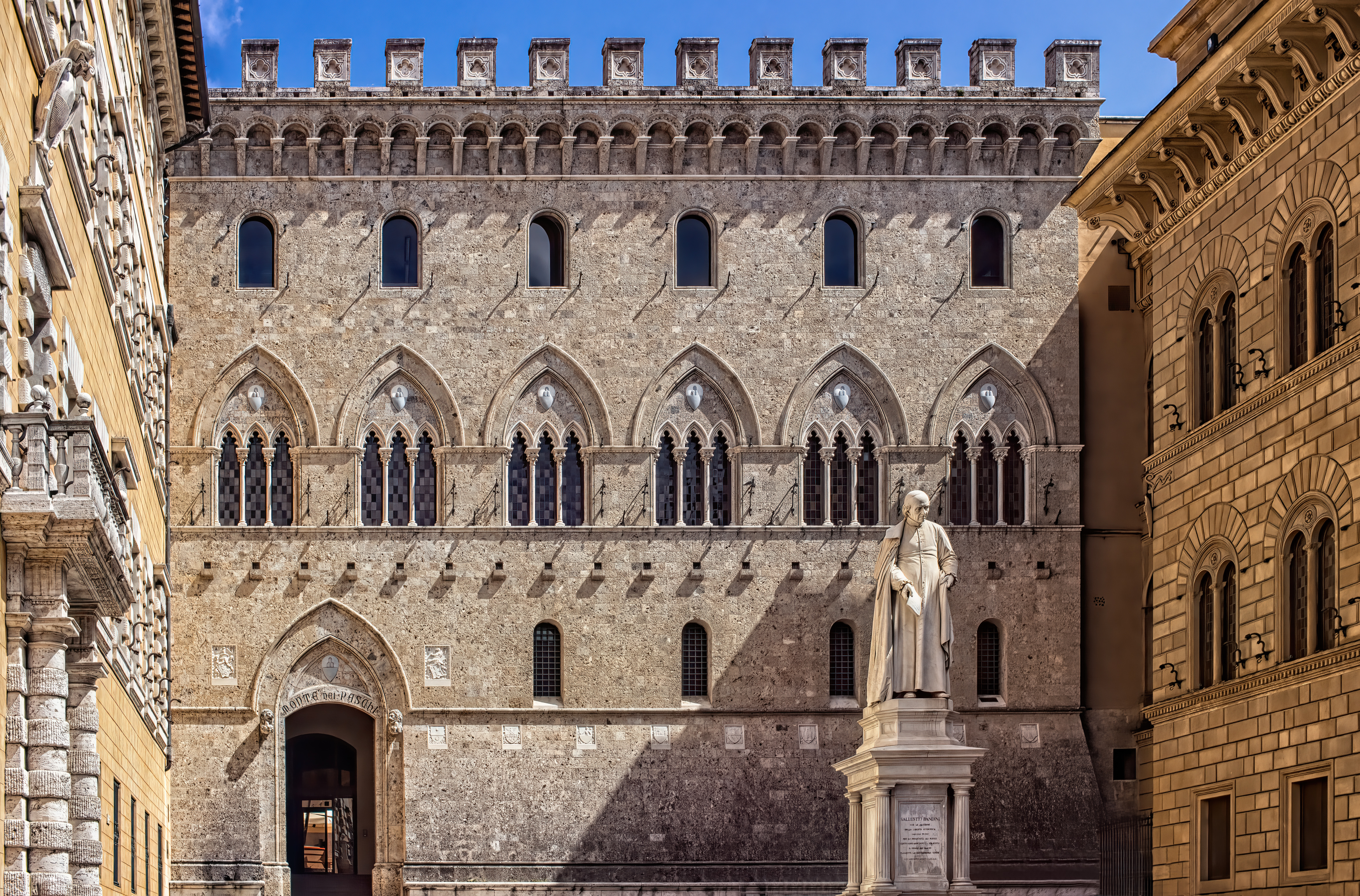
Banca Monte dei Paschi di Siena, founded in 1472, is the world's oldest or second oldest bank in continuous operation.

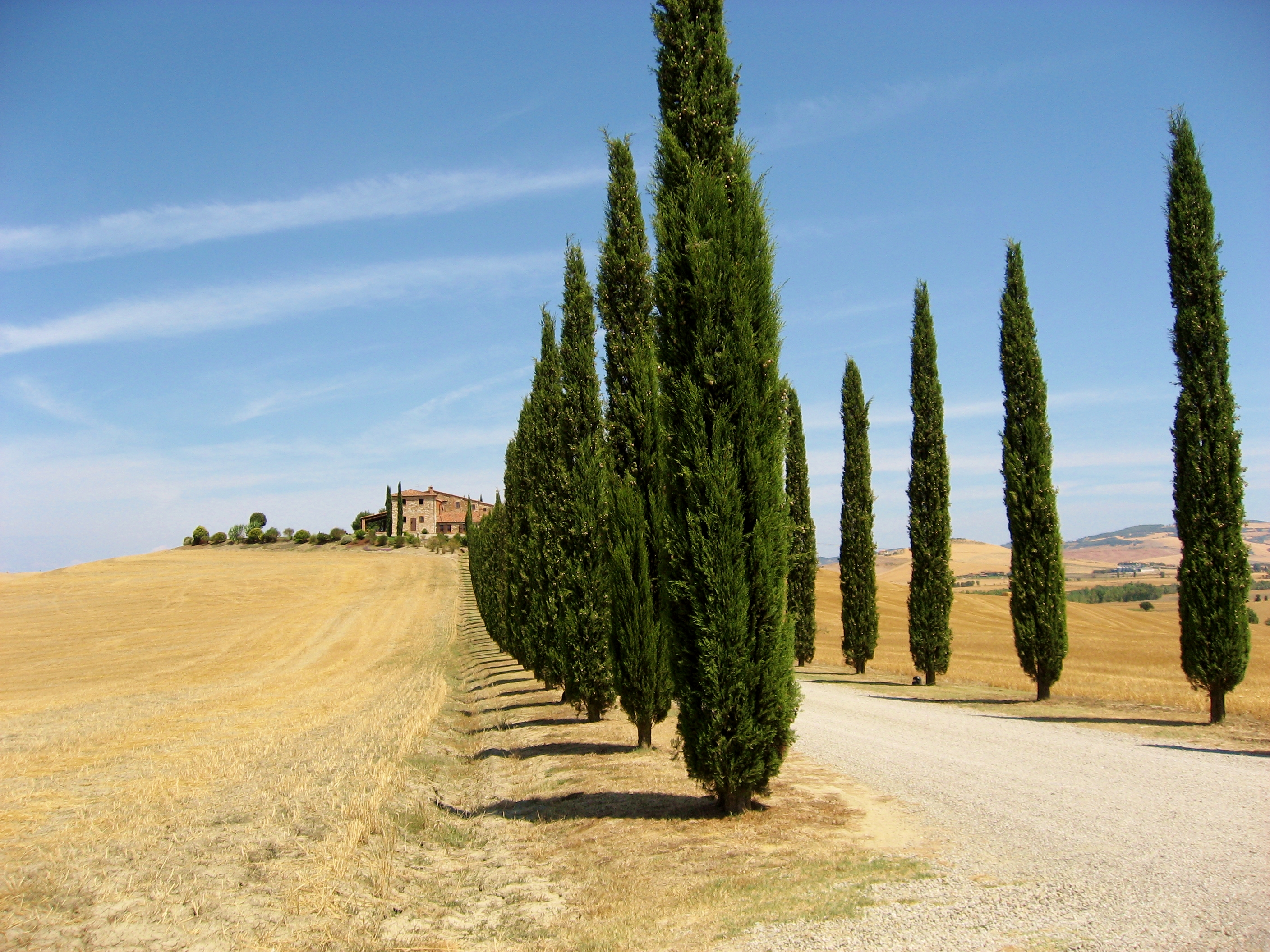
Tuscan agricultural landscape

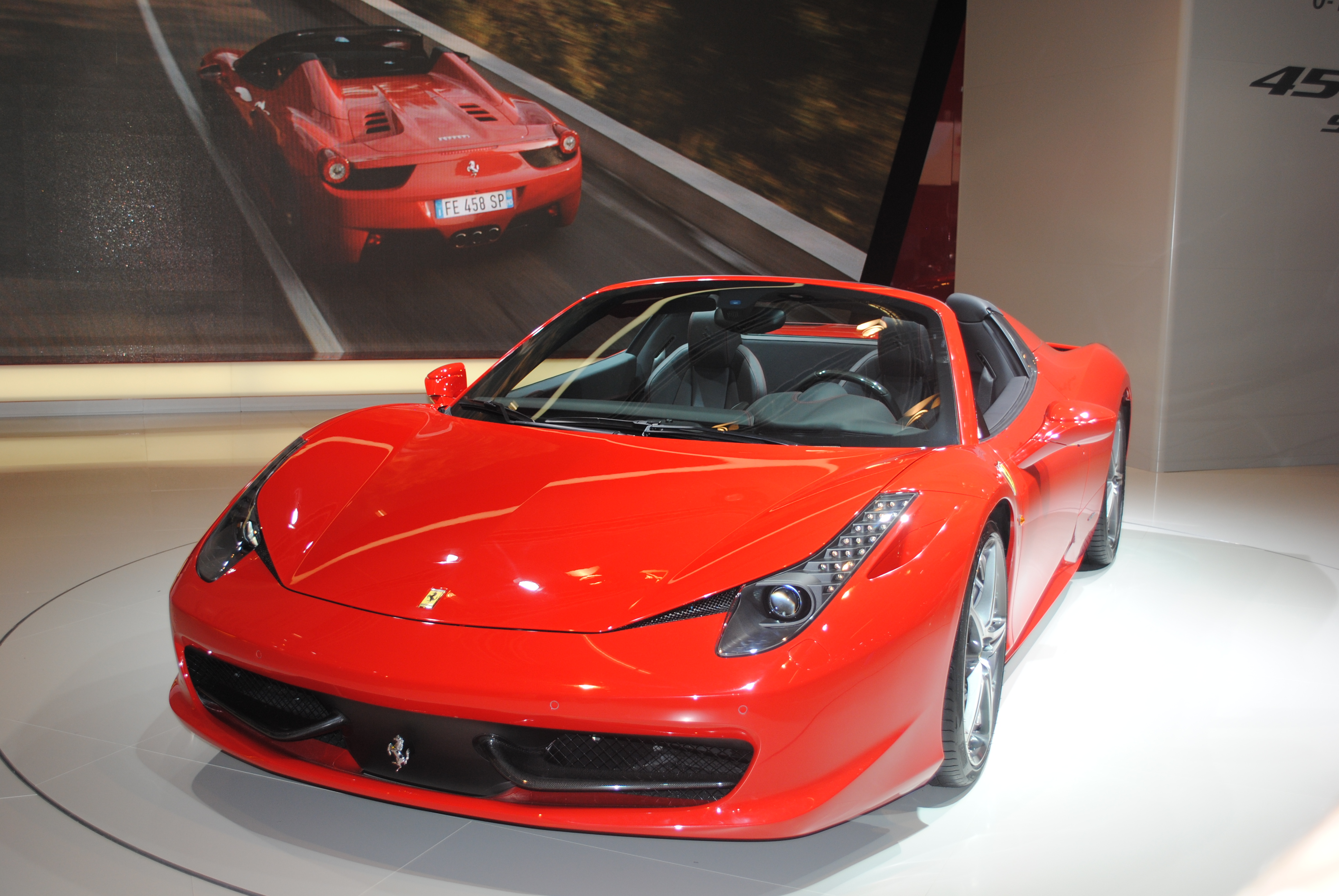
Ferrari 458 Spider, a sports car produced by the Italian manufacturer Ferrari

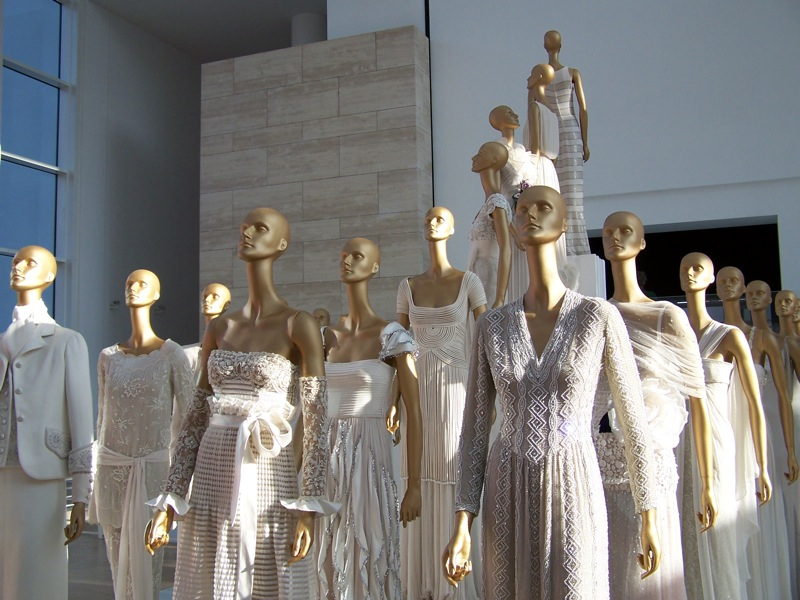
White Valentino dresses in celebration of Valentino's 45 years in fashion

Rome, one of the most important tourist destinations of the world

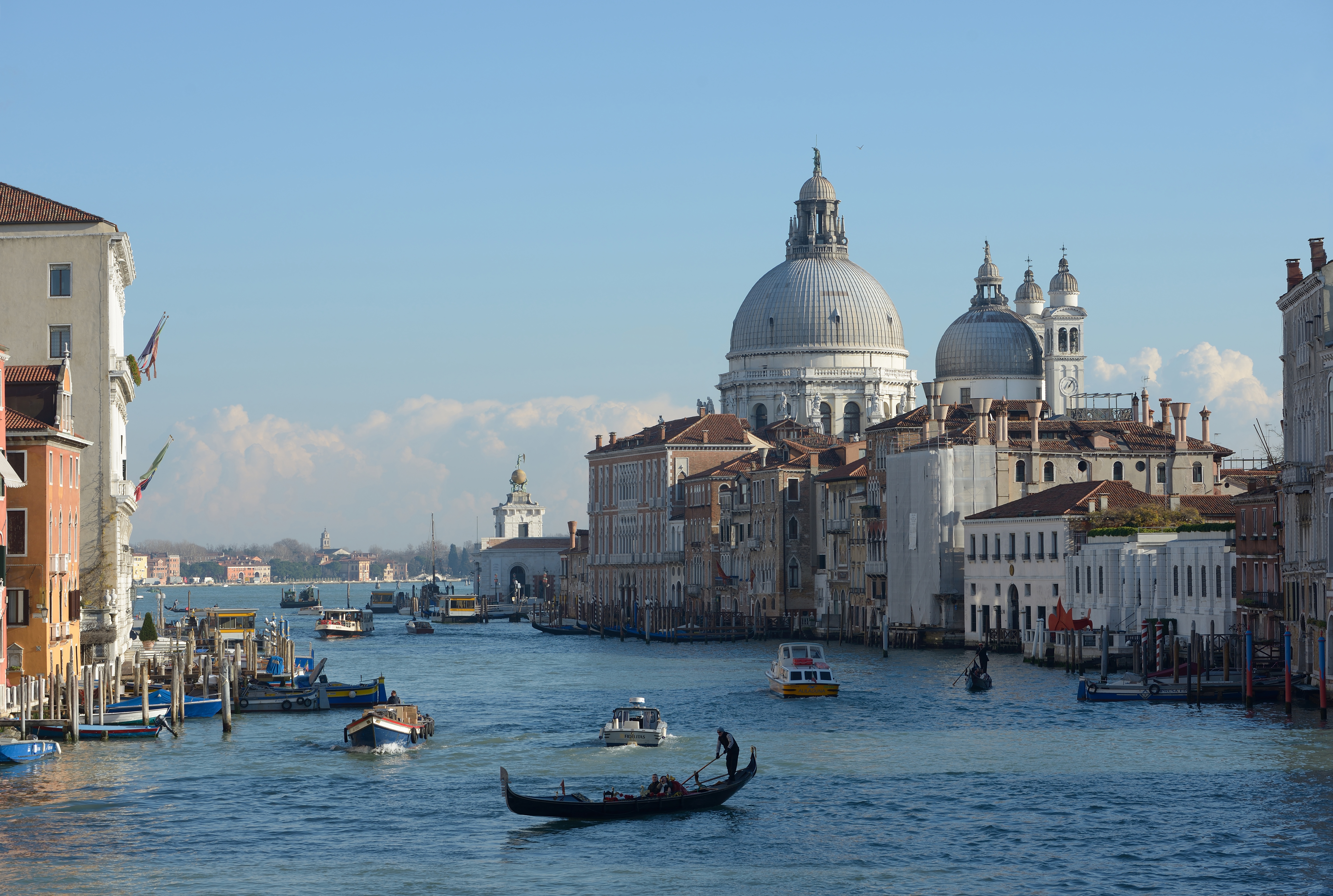
Venice, ranked many times as the most beautiful city in the world, one of the most important tourist destinations of the world

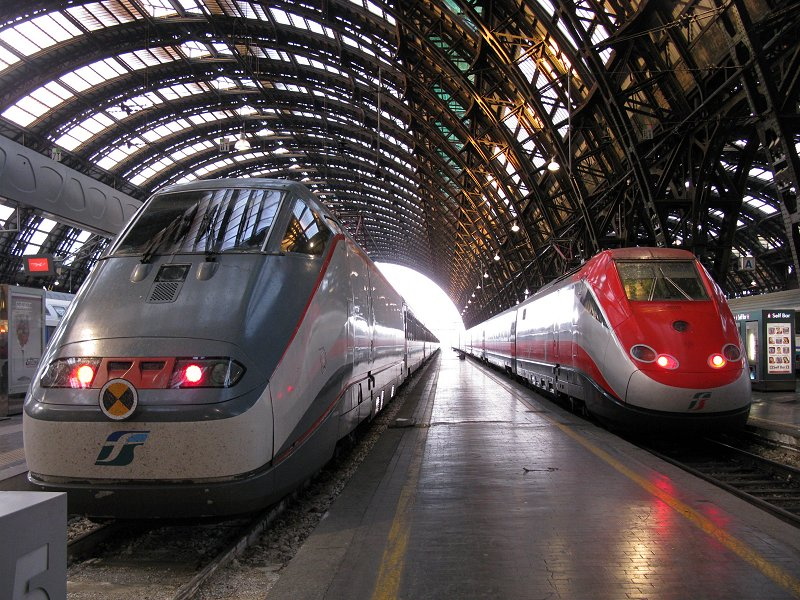
Frecciabianca (left) and Frecciarossa (right) high-speed trains at Milan Central railway station

Economy of Italy

- Economic rank, by nominal GDP (2018): 8th (eighth)
- Agriculture in Italy
  - Artichoke production in Italy
- Banking in Italy
  - Bank of Italy
  - Banks in Italy
  - Borsa Italiana (stock exchange)
- Telecommunications in Italy
  - Internet in Italy
- Companies of Italy
- Currency of Italy: Euro (see also: Euro topics)
  - Former currency: Italian lira
  - ISO 4217: EUR
- Economic history of Italy
  - Economy of Italy under fascism
  - Italian economic battles
  - Italian economic miracle
- Italian government debt
- Italian wine
- Energy in Italy
  - Electricity sector in Italy
  - Nuclear power in Italy
  - Renewable energy in Italy
    - Biofuel in Italy
    - Geothermal power in Italy
    - Hydroelectricity in Italy
    - Solar power in Italy
    - Wind power in Italy
- Gambling in Italy
- Labor policy in Italy
- Exports of Italy
- List of Italian brands
- Italian regions by GDP
- Manufacturing in Italy
  - Automotive industry in Italy
    - Automobile manufacturers of Italy
  - Fashion industry of Italy
    - Fashion in Milan
  - Steel industry in Italy
- Made in Italy
- Science and technology in Italy
  - Accademia dei Lincei
  - Italian robotics
  - Italian Space Agency
  - National Antarctic Research Program
- Southern question
- Taxation in Italy
- Tourism in Italy
  - Tourism in Milan
  - Tourism in Rome
  - Visa policy of the Schengen Area
- Trade unions in Italy
- Water supply and sanitation in Italy
- Welfare in Italy

=== Transport in Italy ===
- Transport in Italy
  - Transport in Milan
  - Transport in Rome
  - Airports in Italy
  - Bridges in Italy
  - Roads in Italy
    - Highway system of Italy (Autostrade)
    - Road signs in Italy
    - Speed limits in Italy
  - Rail transport in Italy
    - High-speed rail in Italy
    - Railway stations in Italy
  - Venice People Mover
  - Vehicle registration plates of Italy

=== Local economies ===
- Economy of Milan
- Economy of Naples
- Economy of Rome
- Economy of Turin

== Education in Italy ==
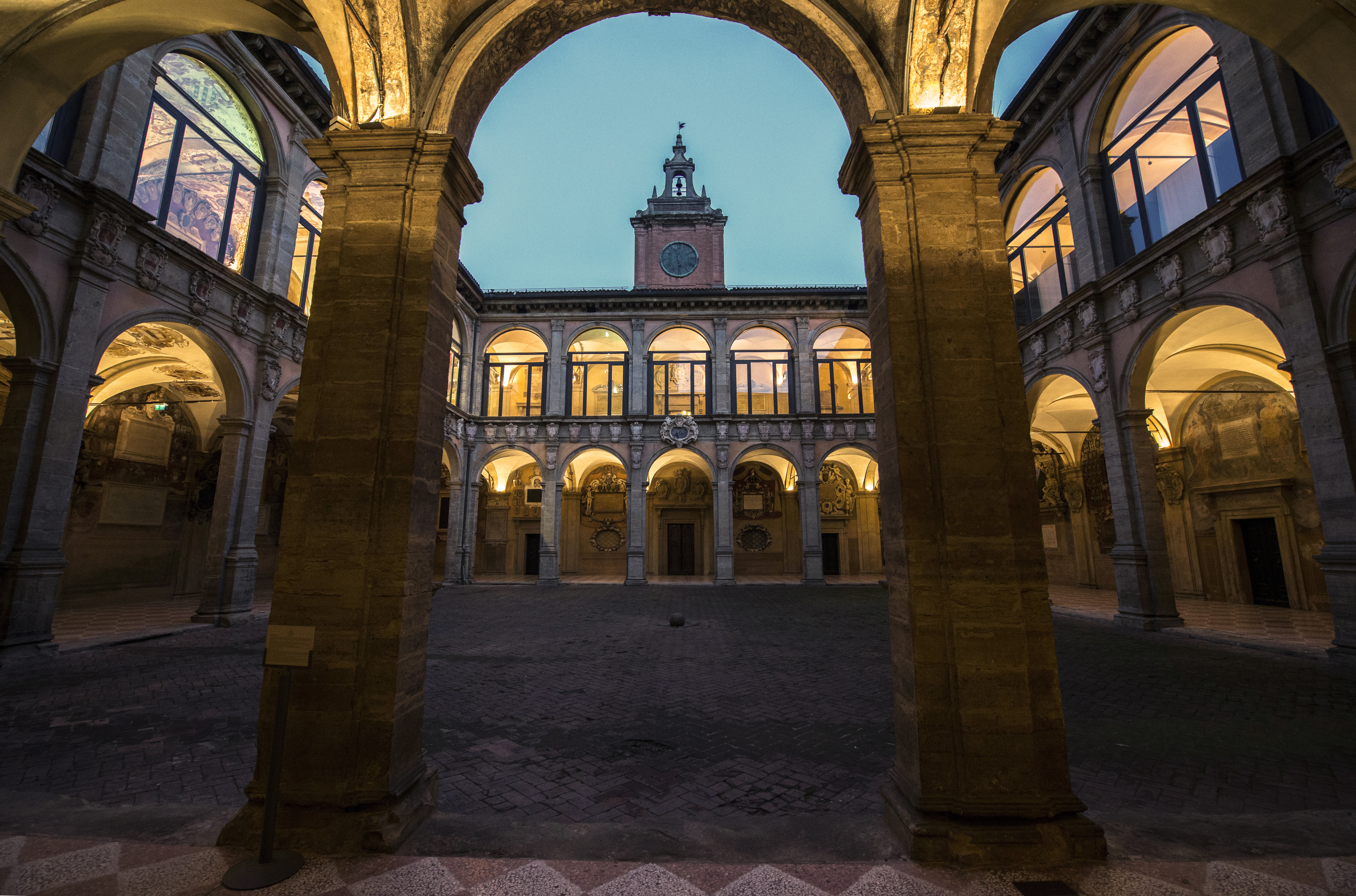
Bologna University, established in AD 1088, is the world's oldest university in continuous operation.

Education in Italy

- Academic grading in Italy
  - GPA in Italy
- Schools in Italy
- Secondary education in Italy
- Higher education in Italy
  - Academic ranks in Italy
  - Universities in Italy

== Health in Italy ==
Health in Italy

- Cannabis in Italy
- Disability in Italy
  - Deafness in Italy
- Healthcare in Italy
  - Abortion in Italy
  - List of hospitals in Italy
  - Italian health insurance card
- Obesity in Italy
- Smoking in Italy

== See also ==
- Index of Italy-related articles
- List of international rankings
- Member state of the European Union
- Member state of the Group of Twenty Finance Ministers and Central Bank Governors
- Member state of the North Atlantic Treaty Organization
- Member state of the United Nations
- Outline of Europe
- Outline of geography
