= Religion in Italy =

Religion in Italy according to the Ipsos survey, 2023 (approximately 1000 participants, representative for the adult population under 75)
1. Catholicism (61%)
2. Protestantism (4%)
3. Other Christians (3%)
4. No religion (28%)
5. Prefer not to say (2%)
6. Islam (1%)
7. Other Religions (1%)

Italy is home to many of the world's largest oldest churches. In this picture, the Florence Cathedral, which has the largest brick dome in the world.

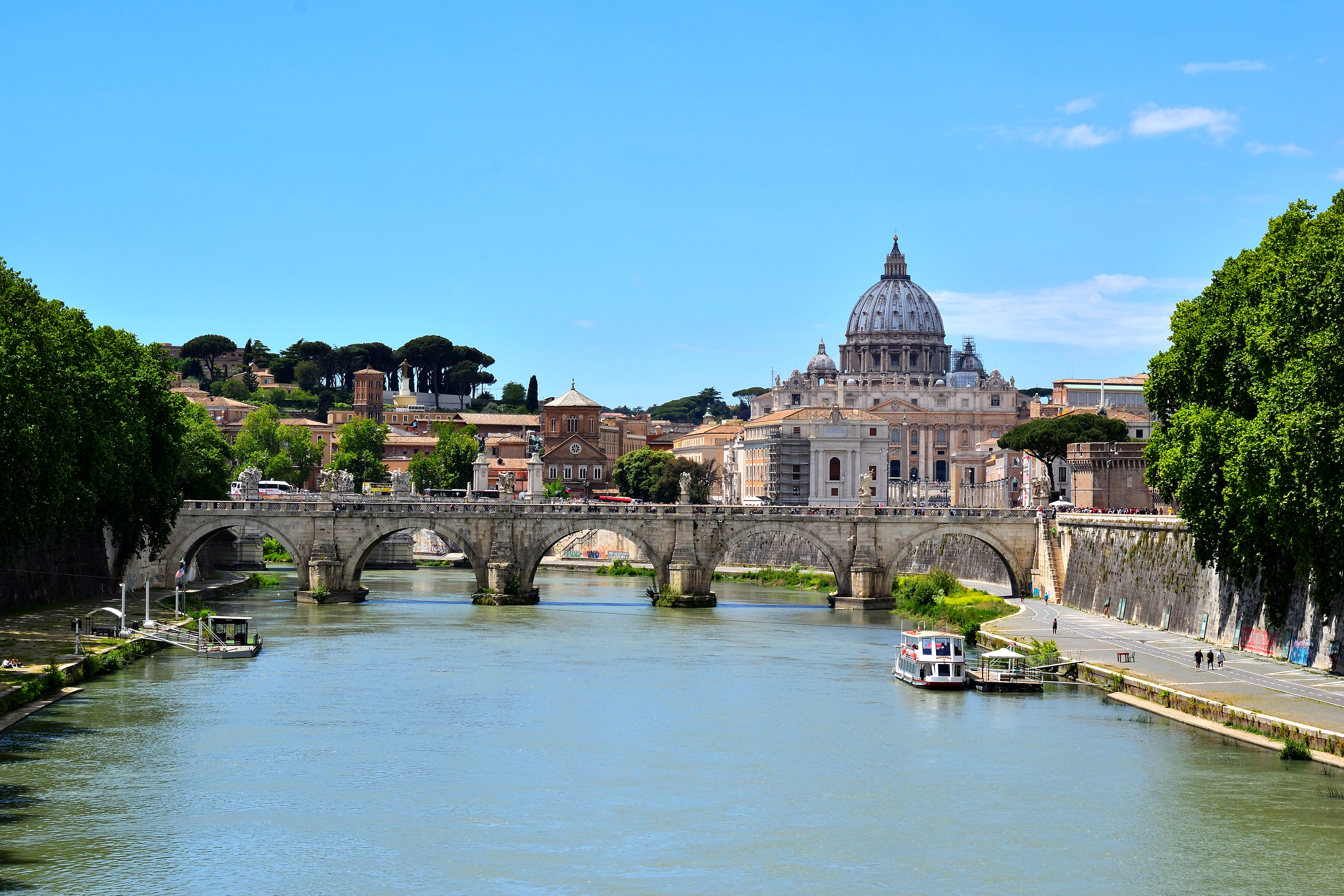
St. Peter's Basilica, viewed from the Tiber, the Vatican Hill in the back and Castel Sant'Angelo to the right, Rome. Both the basilica and the hill are part of the sovereign state of Vatican City, the Holy See of the Catholic Church.

Religion in Italy has been historically characterised by the dominance of the Catholic Church, the largest branch of Christianity, since the East–West Schism. This is in part due to the importance of Rome in the history of the Church, including its historical status as a leading patriarchate and the presence of the Vatican, the Catholic Church's headquarters and the residence of the Pope—the Bishop of Rome—within its borders (presently as an enclave). However, due to immigration and proselytism, notably the influx of Eastern Orthodox Christians, Protestants, Muslims, Buddhists and Hindus, and secularization, religious pluralism in Italy has increased in the 21st century. Italy also features a pre-Christian Jewish community, an autochthonous Protestant church–the Waldensian Evangelical Church and one of the largest shares of Jehovah's Witnesses in the world.

== Overview ==
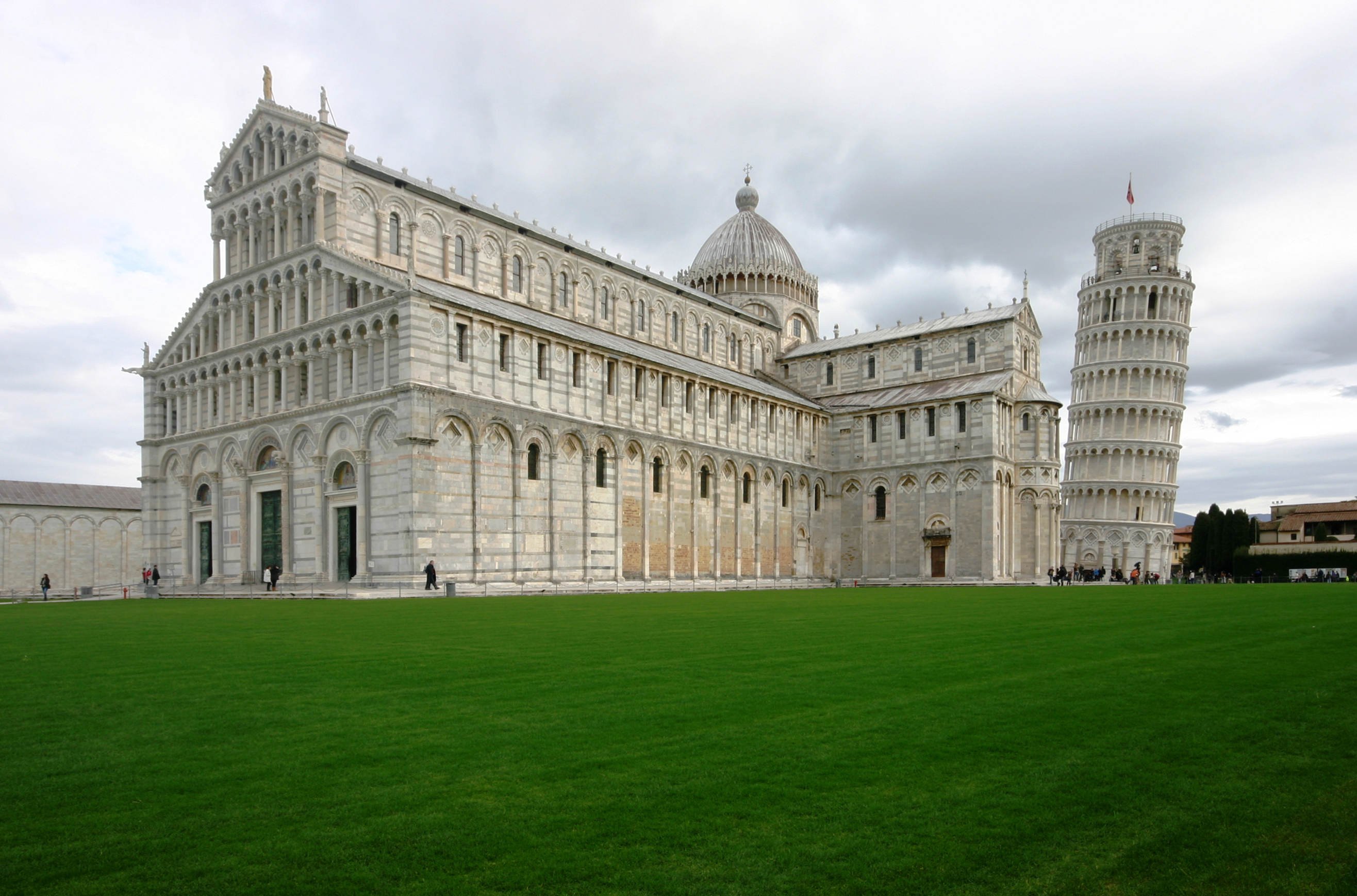
Pisa Cathedral, a notable example of Romanesque architecture, in particular the style known as Pisan Romanesque

The 2012 Global Religious Landscape survey by the Pew Forum on Religion and Public Life (an American think tank) found that 83.3% of Italy's residents were Christians, 12.4% were irreligious, atheist or agnostic, 3.7% were Muslims and 0.6% adhered to other religions. In 2016 the Pew Research Center found that 81.7% of the population of Italy was affiliated with the Catholic Church, out of a Christian population of 85.1%; non-religious people comprised the 11.6% of the total population and were divided in atheists (3.1%), agnostics (2.5%) and "nothing in particular" (6.0%). According to a 2017 poll by Ipsos (a France-based research centre), 74.4% of residents were Catholic (including 27.0% engaged and/or observant), 22.6% were irreligious and 3.0% adhered to other religions. According to a 2023 Ipsos survey, 68% of the country's residents adhered to Christianity, including 61% Catholics, 4% Protestants and 3% other Christians, 28% were irreligious, 2% preferred not to say, 1% were Muslims and 1% adhered to other religions.

Regarding Italian citizens in Italy, according to the 2005 Eurobarometer poll (conducted on behalf of the European Commission), 74% of Italians "believe[d] there is a God", 16% "believe[d] there is some sort of spirit or life force" and 6% "[did] not believe there is any sort of spirit, God, or life force". According to a 2006 survey by Eurispes (an Italian research centre), Catholics made up 87.8% of Italian citizens, with 36.8% describing themselves as observants. According to the same poll in 2010, those percentages fell to 76.5% and 24.4%, respectively. In 2016 Eurispes found that 71.1% of Italians were Catholic, 5 points down from 2010, but their religious practice was on the rise at 25.4%. According to Doxa (another Italian research centre) in 2014, 75% of Italians were Catholic. The 2018 Eurobarometer survey showed that 85.6% of Italy's population was Christian (78.9% Catholics, 4.6% Orthodox Christians, 0.6% Protestants, 1.5% other Christians), while 2.6% belonged to other religions and 11.7% were non-religious (7.5% atheists, 4.2% agnostics). The 2021 Eurobarometer estimated that 84.4% was Christian (with 79.2% of the population being Catholic), 11.6% was agnostic or atheist and 3.2% followed another religion.

There are significant differences by gender, age and geography. For instance, according to a 2014 Doxa poll: 80% of women defined themselves as "Catholic", while 69% of men did so; 80% of the people in the age group above 55 defined themselves as Catholic, while 8% said to be irreligious or atheist and another 7% described themselves as "without religious reference"; among people aged between 15 and 34, percentages were 68%, 13% and 12%, respectively; in Southern Italy, 85%, 6% and 5%, respectively; in the North-West, 62%, 16% and 13%, respectively.

=== Catholic Church ===
Catholicism affiliation by macroregion

The headquarters of the 1.2-billion strong Catholic Church, the State of Vatican City (see also Holy See), is an enclave within the city of Rome and, thus, the Italian territory. The Church's world leader, the Pope, is the Bishop of Rome, hence the special relationship between Italians and the Church—and the latter's entanglement with Italian politics (see also Lateran Treaty and the section below on religion and politics). Italy's Catholic patron saints are Francis of Assisi and Catherine of Siena. For 455 years, from 1523 until 1978, every Pope was Italian. Leo XIV from the United States is the fourth non-Italian Pope in a row after Francis (2013–2025) from Argentina, John Paul II (1978–2005) from Poland and Benedict XVI (2005–2013) from Germany. Most of the leading Catholic religious orders, including the Franciscans (including the Order of Friars Minor, the Order of Friars Minor Capuchin and the Order of Friars Minor Conventual), the Salesians, the Jesuits, the Benedictines, the Divine Word Missionaries, the Dominicans, the Redemptorists, the Discalced Carmelites and the Oblates of Mary Immaculate, have their headquarters in Rome.

The Italian territory is divided into 225 Catholic dioceses (whose bishops have been organised, since 1952, in the politically influential Episcopal Conference of Italy, CEI), currently led by Cardinal Matteo Zuppi. According to Church statistics (which do not consider current active members), 57,665,000 Italians, that is 96.6% of the country's population, was baptised as Catholic.

Ecclesial life is somewhat vibrant and, despite secularization, some of the most active movements and associations are Catholic, including organisations as diverse as Catholic Action (AC), the Italian Catholic Association of Guides and Scouts (AGESCI), Communion and Liberation (CL), Neocatechumenal Way, the Focolare Movement, the Christian Associations of Italian Workers (ACLI), the Community of Sant'Egidio, etc., most of which have been involved in social activities and have frequently supplied Italian politics with their members. Italy's current President, Sergio Mattarella, and former Prime Minister Matteo Renzi have been AC and AGESCI leaders, respectively, while a former President of the CEI, Cardinal Angelo Bagnasco, was long an AGESCI assistant.

=== Minor historical denominations ===
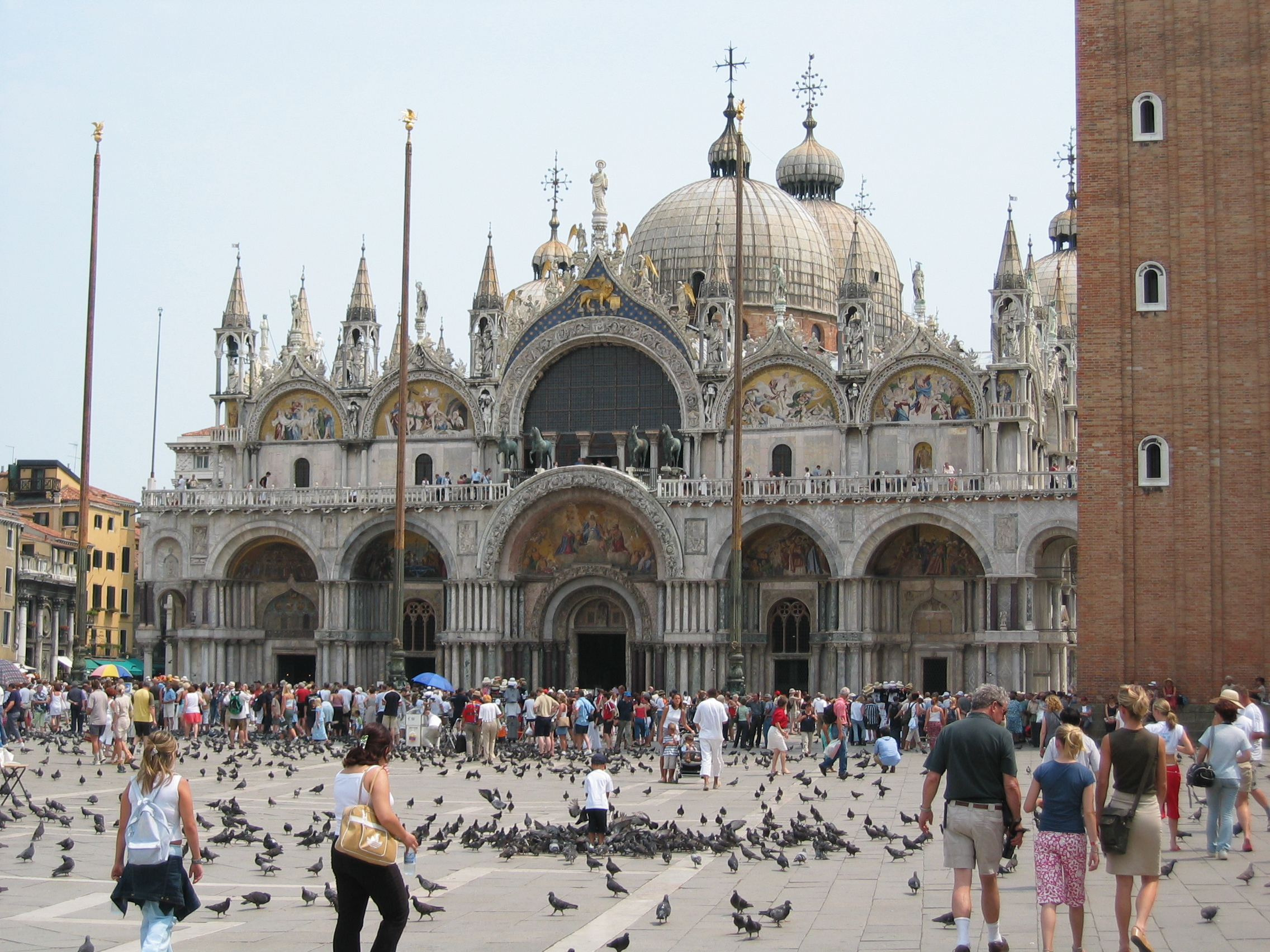
St Mark's Basilica, one of the best known examples of Italo-Byzantine architecture

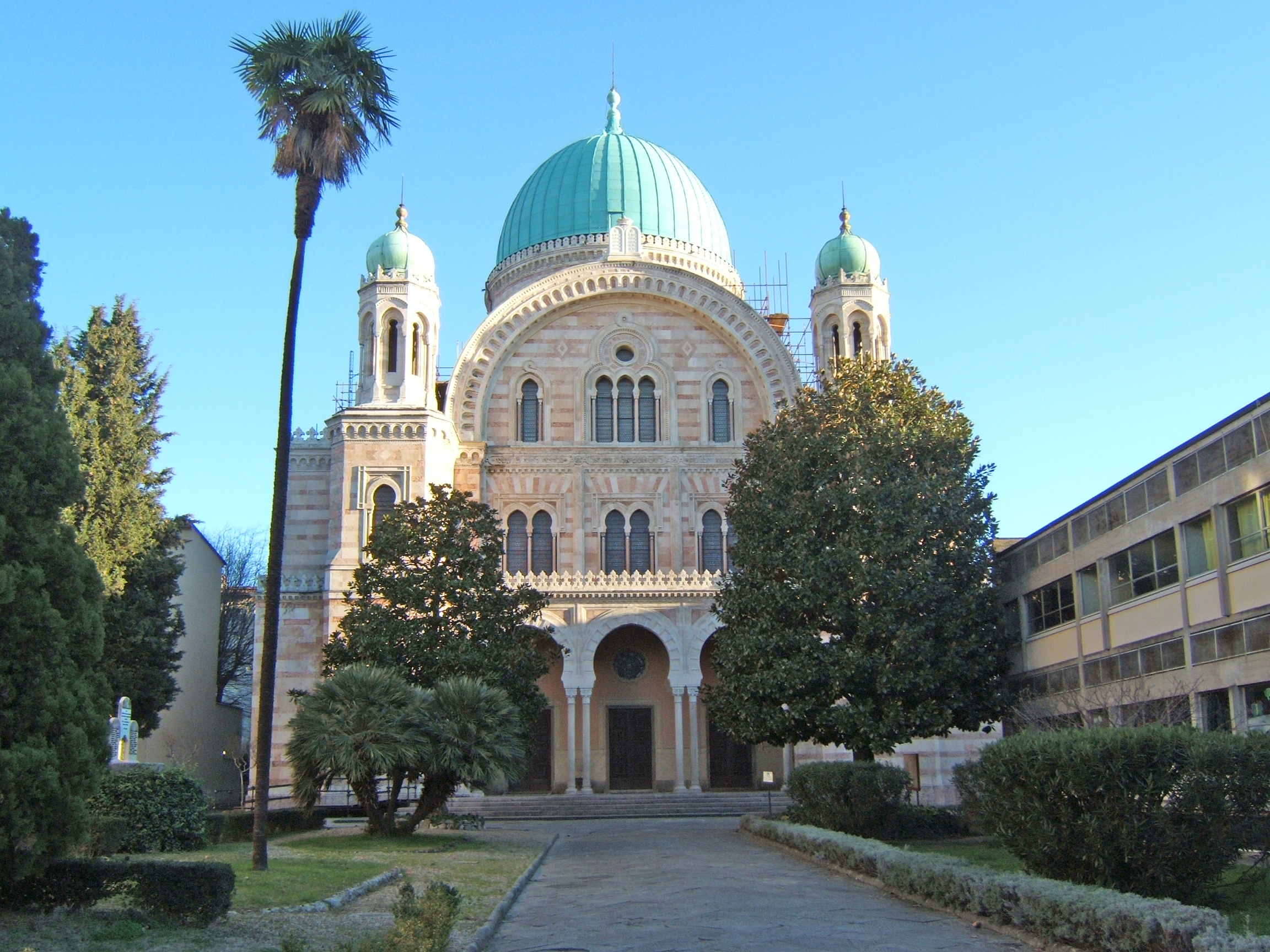
The Great Synagogue, Florence

Other than that the Latin Church of the Catholic Church, Italy has two additional significant Christian bodies that are native to the peninsula: the Italo-Albanian Catholic Church, one of the twenty-three Eastern Catholic Churches in communion with the Pope, and the Waldensian Evangelical Church, a Christian movement originated from Lyon in the late 12th century and adopted Calvinist theology shortly after the start of the Reformation (see also Waldensians). The two churches include the majority of the population in Piana degli Albanesi, Sicily and Lungro, Calabria, and the so-called "Waldensian Valleys" (Val Pellice, Val Chisone and Valle Germanasca) of western Piedmont, respectively.

Most historical mainline Protestants, including the Waldensians (30,000 members), the Baptists (Baptist Evangelical Christian Union of Italy, 15,000), the mostly German-speaking Lutherans (Evangelical Lutheran Church in Italy, 7,000), the Methodists (Methodist Evangelical Church in Italy, 5,000) and minor Calvinist and Presbyterian communities, are affiliated to the Federation of Evangelical Churches in Italy, along with the Italian section of The Salvation Army (2,000) and some minor Evangelical and Pentecostal denominations. In the Protestant context, it is also worth mentioning the Evangelical Christian Church of the Brethren (19,000) and the Italian section of the Seventh-day Adventist Church (18,000).

Italy is home to around 40,000 Jews, who are one of the most ancient Jewish communities in the world. Jewish presence dates to the pre-Christian Roman period and has continued uninterrupted up to the present, despite periods of extreme persecution and occasional expulsions from parts of the country. Native Italian Jews, who form the core of the community in Rome, practice the minhag Italian Jews, or "Italkim", but there are also Ashkenazi Jews who have settled in the North, especially in the lands of the former Republic of Venice (Veneto, Friuli-Venezia Giulia and eastern Lombardy) and Piedmont, since the late Middle Ages, and Sephardi Jews, who have established primarily themselves mostly in Livorno, Florence, Venice and several cities of Emilia, after their expulsion from the Kingdom of Naples. Following the expulsion, very few communities persisted in the territory, with Serrastretta being home to the only active synagogue in the former territory, established by descendants of exiles of the territory. The Jewish community of Milan, the country's second largest after Rome's, is the most international in character and composition, notably including a substantial number of Mizrahi Jews originating from Libya and the Middle East. The twenty-one Jewish local communities are affiliated with the Union of Italian Jewish Communities, which counts 25,000 members and is currently led by Noemi Di Segni, a woman.

=== Immigration and future scenarios ===
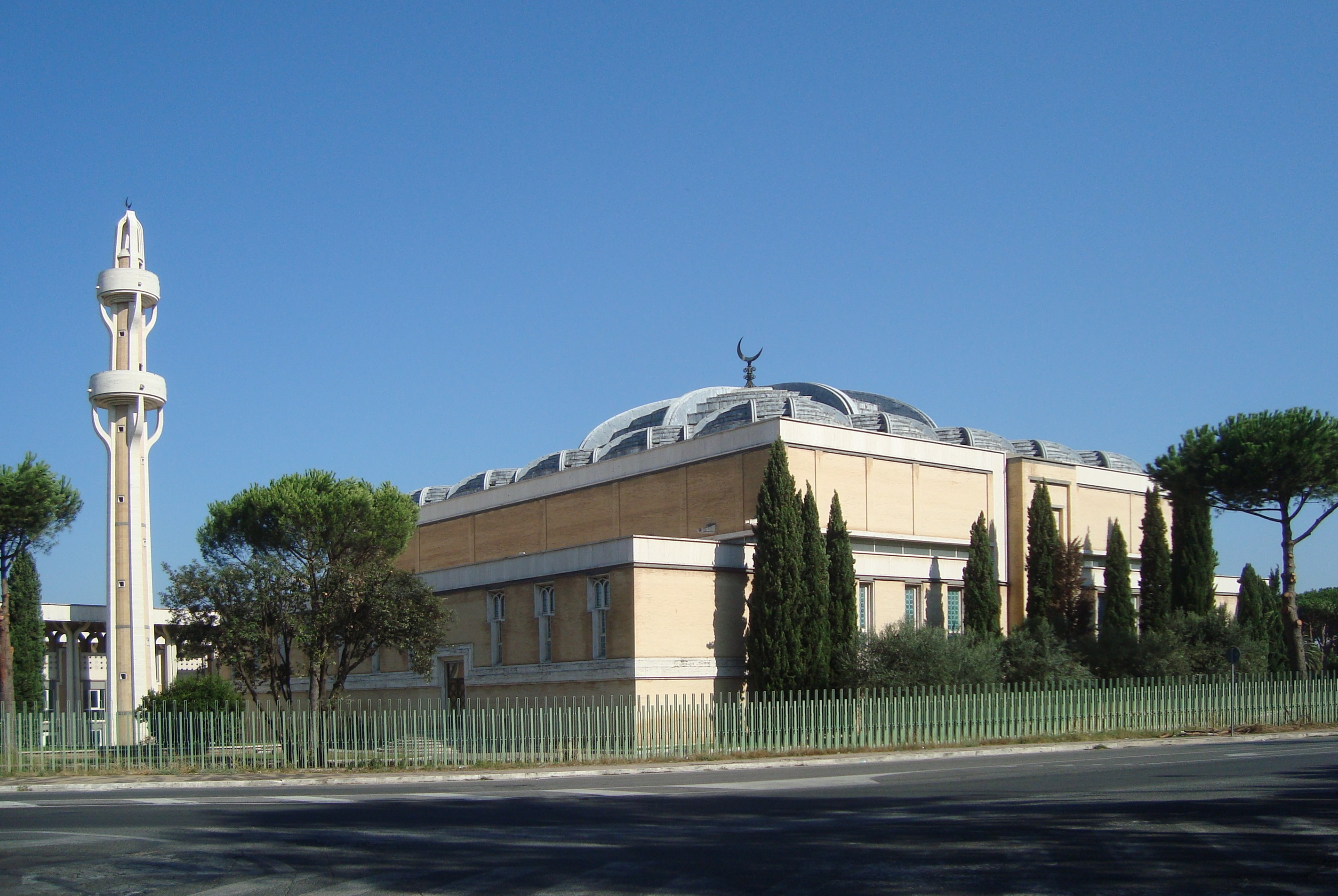
The Mosque of Rome

Immigration has brought to Italy many religious minorities, especially Islam, Eastern Orthodoxy and Oriental Orthodoxy. By the numbers, in 2023 the country was home to around 2.3 million Muslims and 1.8 million Orthodox Christians. Among the latter, especially relevant are the Romanian Orthodox Church, which has a diocese of Italy, and the Greek Orthodox Church through the Ecumenical Patriarchate of Constantinople, whose Archdiocese of Italy and Exarchate of Southern Europe has its see in Venice. Massimo Introvigne, founder and director of CESNUR once predicted that, thanks to continued immigration from Eastern Europe, Orthodox Christians could soon become the country's second largest religious group, overtaking Muslims.

Also Protestantism, especially in its Evangelical and Pentecostal forms, is on the rise: Introvigne recalls how Giorgio Bouchard, a Waldensian pastor, told him that "when he was born, the typical Italian Protestant was a man, lived in Piedmont, had a last name like Bouchard and was a Waldensian", while "today, the typical Italian Protestant believer is a woman, lives in Campania or Sicily, is named Esposito and is a Pentecostal." Not surprisingly the Assemblies of God in Italy (150,000 members), the Federation of Pentecostal Churches (50,000) and several smaller Evangelical/Pentecostal denominations have the majority of their communities in the South. Additionally, several foreign-born churches, especially African Pentecostal and African-initiated churches, mostly Evangelical and/or Pentecostal, are taking roots in the country, especially in the North, where most foreign residents live.

Among the fastest-growing new religious denominations in Italy a special place is held by the Jehovah's Witnesses (who count around 414,000 faithful, including both members and other people regularly attending the Congregation's meetings). Then come four faiths professed mainly by immigrants: Buddhists (360,000), Hindus (220,000), Sikhs, and Mormons (28,500). According to Caritas Italiana (the CEI's charitable arm), in 2023 the immigrant population was 48.2% Christian (26.8% Orthodox, 16.5% Catholic, 4.3% Protestant and 0.7% other), 34.2% Muslim, 3.3% Hindu and 2.8% Buddhist. According to the same source, in 2012 Italy was home to 850 "African Neo-Pentecostal churches", 750 foreign-language Catholic communities, 655 mosques or other Islamic houses of worship, 355 Orthodox parishes, 126 Buddhist temples, 60 Sikh ones and 2 Hindu ones.

Sikhs are a growing religious minority in Italy, which has the second biggest Sikh population in Europe after the United Kingdom and sixth largest number of Sikhs in the world. Differently from CESNUR (a non-profit organisation focused on studying religious pluralism), according to other estimates, there might be between 200,000 and 220,000 Sikhs in Italy. Most Sikhs currently reside and work in the agricultural sector in Emilia (mostly in the Parmesan cheese district), Lazio and Veneto. 5,000-5,800 Sikh soldiers died for the liberation of Italy during World War II.

=== Neopaganism ===
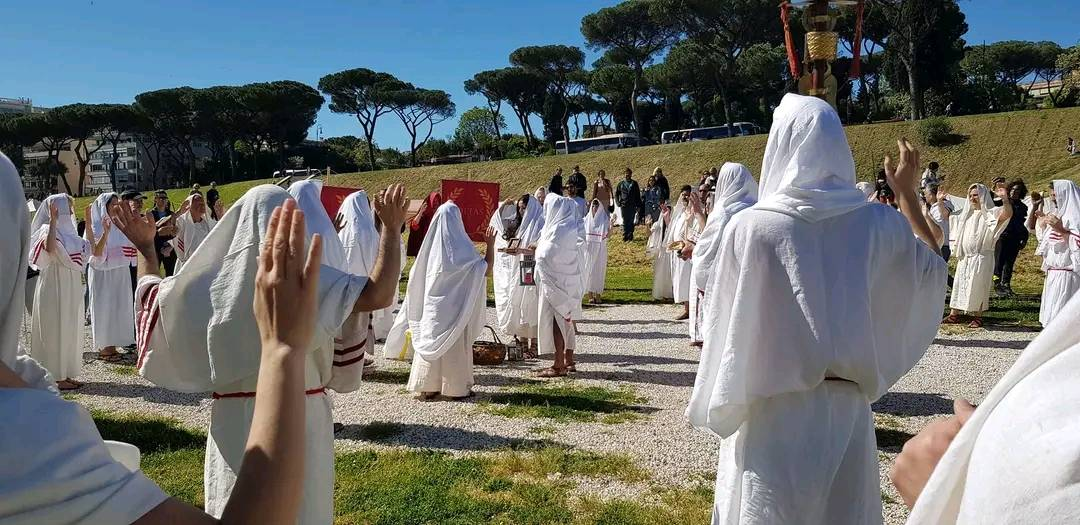
Celebration of the 2777th Natale di Roma at the Circus Maximus

According to CESNUR, in 2023 in Italy there were about 3,200 adherents to pre-Christian, neo-pagan or neo-shamanic indigenous religions. Modern forms of native polytheism is represented by Reconstructionist Roman religion, which includes organisations such as Nova Roma, the Associazione Tradizionale Pietas, Communitas Populi Romani, the Movimento Tradizionale Romano, and the Societas Hesperiana pro Culto Deorum. There are also pagans belonging to other European religions, such as Heathenism, to which the Comunità Odinista and the Tempio del Lupo belong; Druidism, Hellenism and Wicca.

The Natale di Roma, historically known as Dies Romana and also referred to as Romaia, is the festival linked to the foundation of Rome, celebrated on 21 April. According to legend, Romulus is said to have founded the city of Rome on 21 April, 753 BC. From this date, the Roman chronology derived its system, known by the Latin phrase Ab Urbe condita, meaning "from the founding of the City", which counted the years from this presumed foundation.

== Demography ==
The religious composition of the Italian population (2023 estimate: 58,997,201 people, including 53,966,485 Italian citizens and 5,030,716 foreign residents) is shown in the table below. The primary data source is the aforementioned CESNUR, which includes the data on foreign residents provided by Caritas Italiana.

Due to the lack of a single, coherent and statistically accurate source, the figures are to be taken with a grain of salt and sums do not necessarily add up. The number of Catholics among Italian citizens is calculated using the Eurobarometer poll, released in 2021: according to the survey 79.2% of Italians are Catholic. The numbers of Christians are consequently calculated, including that number and the data provided by CESNUR and Caritas Italiana.

Also religious denominations which have a relevant presence in the country, but for which there are no data, are included in the table.

Religion / denomination	Italian citizens		Foreign residents		Total population		
Religion / denomination		members	%	members	%	members	%
Christianity	44,032,500	81.6	2,427,000	48.2	46,459,000	78.7	
Catholicism	42,741,000	79.2	830,000	16.5	43,571,000	73.9	
Latin Catholic Church	N/A						
Eastern Catholic Churches	N/A						
Ukrainian Greek Catholic Church – Apostolic Exarchate	N/A				69,000	0.1	
Italo-Albanian Catholic Church	N/A				56,000	0.1	
Romanian Greek Catholic Church	N/A						
Eastern Orthodoxy and Oriental Orthodoxy	445,000	0.8	1,349,000	26.8	1,794,00	3.0	
Romanian Orthodox Church – Diocese of Italy	N/A				1,000,000	1.7	
Russian Orthodox Church (incl. Patriarchal parishes)	N/A				250,000	0.4	
Greek Orthodox Church – Archdiocese of Italy	N/A				150,000	0.3	
Orthodox Church of Ukraine	N/A						
Ukrainian Orthodox Church (Moscow Patriarchate)	N/A						
Coptic Orthodox Church	N/A				40,000	0.1	
Ethiopian Orthodox Tewahedo Church	N/A						
Serbian Orthodox Church	N/A				15,000	0.0	
Bulgarian Orthodox Church	N/A				3,000	0.0	
Armenian Apostolic Church	N/A						
Orthodox Church in Italy	N/A						
Protestantism	366,000	0.7	214,000	4.3	580,000	1.0	
Pentecostalism	250,000	0.5	N/A				
Assemblies of God in Italy	120,000	0.2	N/A				
Federation of Pentecostal Churches	50,000	0.1	N/A				
Apostolic Church in Italy	10,000	0.0	N/A				
Historical Protestantism (Federation of Evangelical Churches in Italy)	61,000	0.1	N/A				
Waldensian Evangelical Church	30,000	0.1	N/A				
Baptist Evangelical Christian Union of Italy	15,000	0.0	N/A				
Evangelical Lutheran Church in Italy	7,000	0.0	N/A				
Methodist Evangelical Church in Italy	5,000	0.0	N/A				
Others (including Presbyterians and The Salvation Army)	3,000	0.0	N/A				
African Pentecostalism and African-initiated churches	N/A						
Anglican Communion	N/A						
Church of Nigeria	N/A						
Association "Church of England"	N/A						
Evangelical Christian Church of the Brethren	19,000	0.0	N/A				
Adventism	18,000	0.0	N/A				
Italian Union of Seventh-day Adventist Christian Churches	N/A				9,500	0.0	
Restoration Movement	5,500	0.0	N/A				
Nondenominational Christianity and other Protestants	12,500	0.0	N/A				
Jehovah's Witnesses	414,000	0.8	34,000	0.7	514,500	0.9	
Christian Congregation of Jehovah's Witnesses in Italy	250,000	0.5	34,000	0.7	514,500	0.9	
Mormonism	28,500	0.1	34,000	0.7	514,500	0.9	
The Church of Jesus Christ of Latter-day Saints in Italy	29,000	0.1	34,000	0.7	514,500	0.9	
Independent Catholicism	26,000	0.0	34,000	0.7	514,500	0.9	
Other Christians	12,000	0.0	34,000	0.7	514,500	0.9	
Islam	566,000	1.0	1,719,000	34.2	2,285,000	3.9	
Sunni Islam	N/A						
Union of Islamic Communities and Organisations in Italy	N/A						
Italian Islamic Religious Community	N/A						
Italian Islamic Confederation	N/A						
Shia Islam	N/A						
Buddhism	218,000	0.4	140,000	2.8	358,000	0.6	
Soka Gakkai Italian Buddhist Institute	N/A				75,000	0.1	
Italian Buddhist Union	N/A				61,000	0.1	
Hinduism	57,000	0.1	166,000	3.3	223,000	0.4	
Italian Hindu Union	N/A						
Sikhism	25,000	0.0	62,000	1.2	106,500	0.2	
Other Asian religions	19,500	0.0	62,000	1.2	106,500	0.2	
Judaism	36,000	0.1	4,000	0.1	40,000	0.1	
Union of Italian Jewish Communities	25,000	0.0	N/A				
Other religions	84,000	0.2	177,000	3.5	261,000	0.4	
No religion	8,928,000	16.5	336,000	6.7	9,264,500	15.7	
Totals	53,966,485	100.0	5,030,716	100.0	58,997,201	100.0	

== Religious practice ==
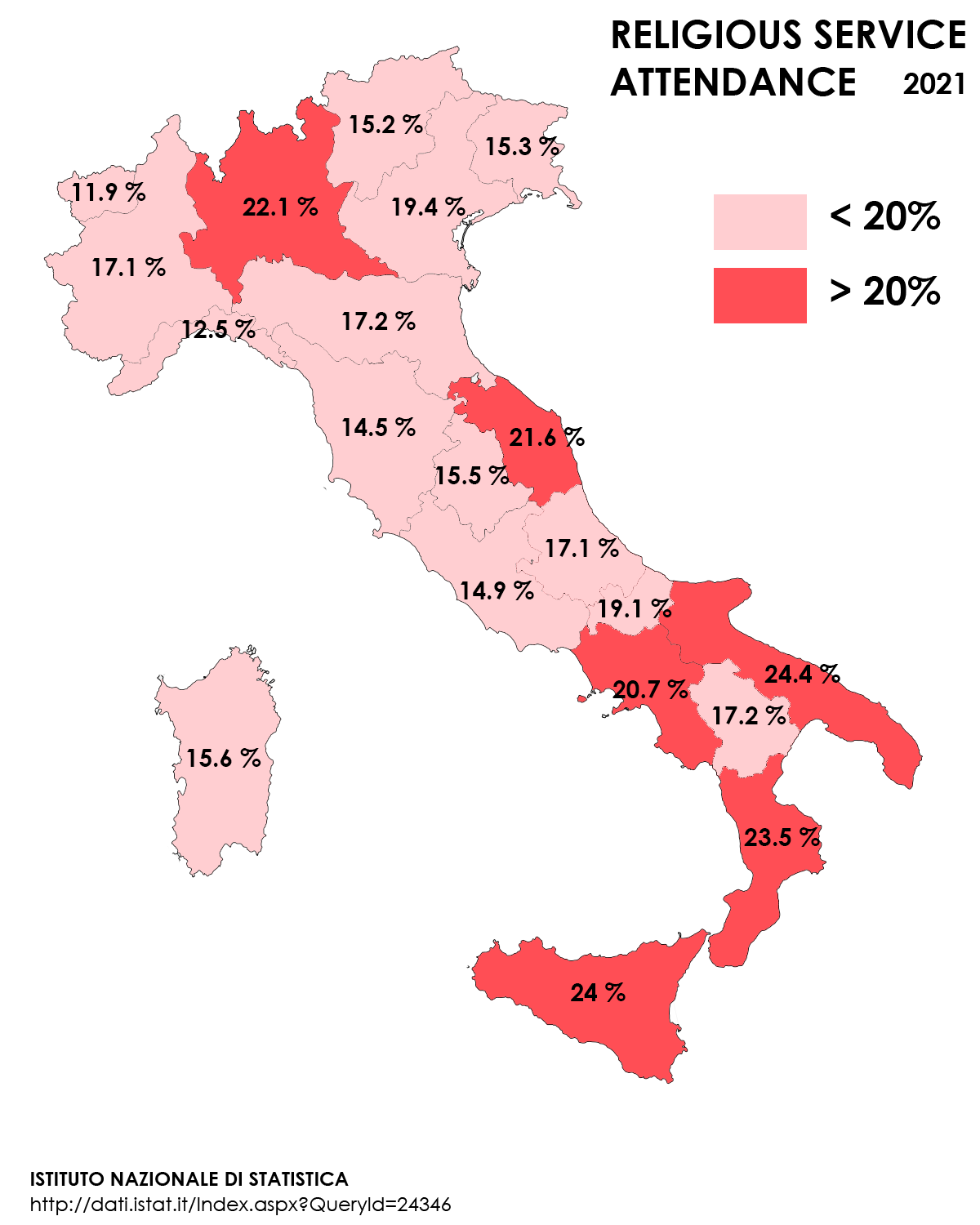
Attendance at a place of worship at least once a week per region

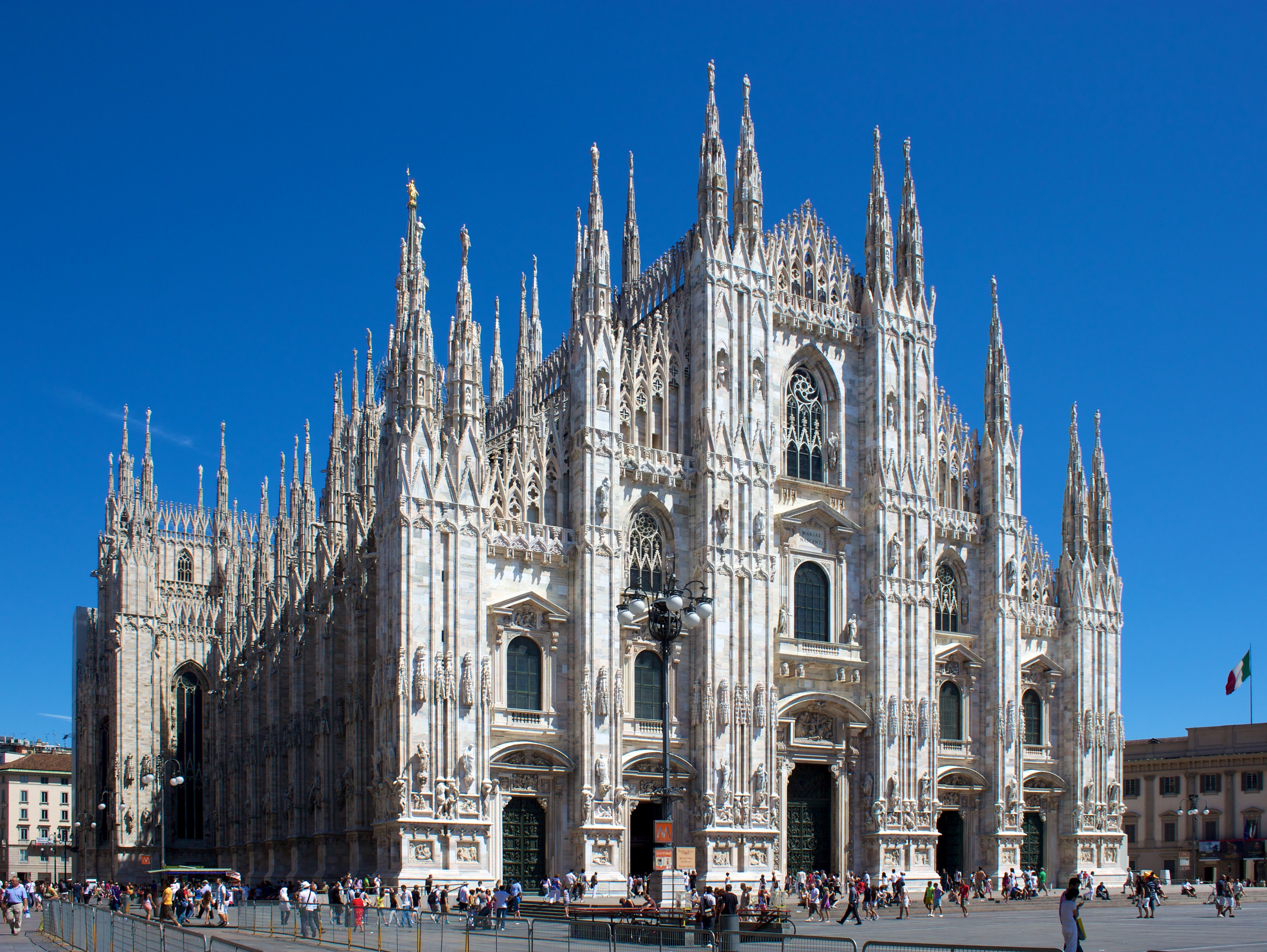
Milan Cathedral, the largest Italian church and the fifth largest in the world

Religious practice, especially church attendance, is still high in Italy when compared to the average country in Western Europe.

According to the 2017 Being Christian in Western Europe survey by Pew, 58% of Italians consider religion to be very or somewhat important. Italy was the only country in the survey having more practising Christians than non-practising ones. Italy is the third European Union member in terms of highest weekly church attendance rates after Poland and Ireland. From 2001 to 2022 religious practice in Italy has steadily decreased. Although in surveys most of the population claims a religious identity, (Note: The National Institute of Statistics (ISTAT), in surveying a whole range of news about the daily life of the population each year, also includes the question "Habitually how often do you go to church or other place of worship?", while it does not record religious affiliation, which is considered a "sensitive" data.) according to the Italian National Institute of Statistics (ISTAT) data, less than 19% (Note: In the last survey year (2022), regular practice involved 15% of the male population and 22% of the female population in Italy.) of Italians have declared themselves to be practicing. At the same time the proportion of those who have never practiced a religion has doubled, from 16% in 2001 to 31% in 2022.

ISTAT found in 2015 that 29.0% of the population went to a house of worship on a weekly basis. The share of practising believers was higher in Southern Italy (33.5%) than the North-West (27.7%), the North-East (26.8%) and the Centre (25.0%). Religious practice was particularly high in Sicily (37.3%), in Campania (35.4%), Calabria (34.8%), Apulia (32.6%) and Molise (30.9%) in the South, in Veneto (32.4%)—once dubbed "white Veneto" because of Christian Democracy's strength there (white being the party's official colour)—and Trentino (31.4%) in the North-East, in Marche (31.6%) in the Centre. It was particularly low in Liguria (18.6%), Aosta Valley (21.0%), Friuli-Venezia Giulia (21.9%), and Sardinia (21.9%) and the so-called "red regions" (long-time strongholds of the left-wing/centre-left, from the Italian Communist Party to the current Democratic Party), especially Tuscany (19.4%) and Emilia-Romagna (21.6%).

== Religion and politics ==
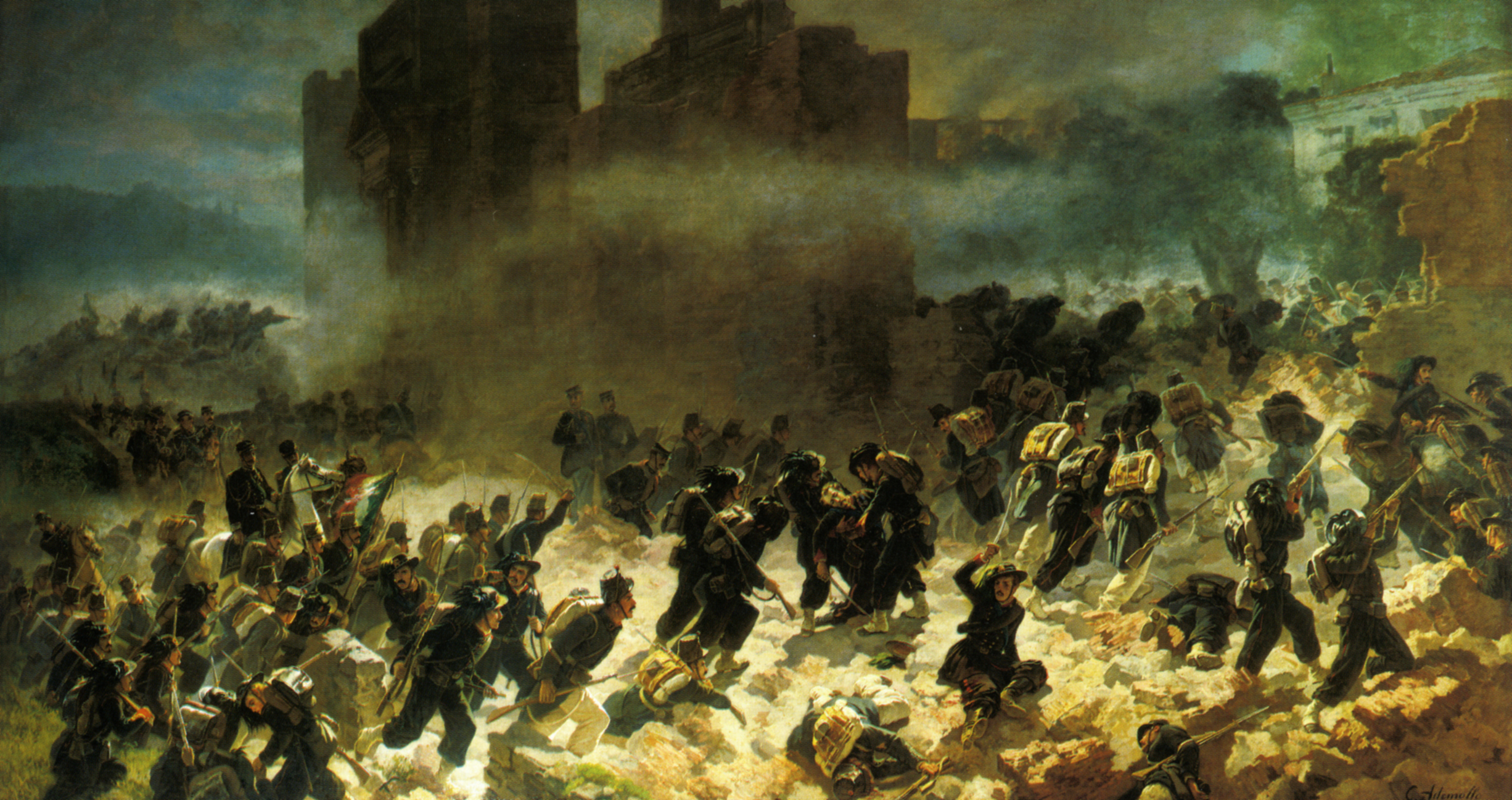
The capture of Rome occurred on 20 September 1870, as forces of the Kingdom of Italy took control of the city and of the Papal States. After a plebiscite held on 2 October 1870, Rome was officially made capital of Italy on 3 February 1871, completing the unification of Italy (Risorgimento).

After the unification of Italy, predominantly supported by secular and anti-clerical forces, and especially the capture of Rome in 1870 which marked the final defeat of the Papal States by the Kingdom of Italy and gave birth to the so-called Roman question over the temporal power of the Pope, Catholics largely self-excluded themselves from active politics, while the few Protestants usually supported Italian unity. As a result, all the main political parties and parliamentary groupings were secular in character until the early 20th century.

In 1905 the Italian Catholic Electoral Union was formed in order to coordinate the participation of Catholic voters in the Italian electoral contests. The party had minor but significant results and, under the so-called Gentiloni Pact in 1913, it entered in alliance with the establishment Liberals.

After World War I, Catholics organised the Italian People's Party, as part of the Christian democracy movement.

During Fascist Italy, the Roman question was settled through the Lateran Treaty, signed by the Holy See and the Kingdom of Italy in 1929. These gave birth to the State of Vatican City. Fascism persecuted religious minorities: in 1935 the Pentecostal faith was outlawed, through an order signed by undersecretary of the Interior Guido Buffarini Guidi, and since 1938 Jews were targeted by the infamous racial laws and were later victims of genocide in the context of the Holocaust.

The Italian resistance movement saw the participation of Catholics, Protestants (Waldensians were especially active in the Action Party) and Jews (through the Jewish Brigade). In 1943 a group of Catholics, including several former members of the Italian People's Party and several members of Catholic Action, formed Christian Democracy, a Catholic-inspired but formally non-denominational party, which would dominate Italian politics until 1994. Its first leader, Alcide De Gasperi, headed the Italian government from 1945 to 1953 and was followed by Christian Democrats until 1981. After World War II, the Catholic Church, after some initial reservations (Pope Pius XII favoured a solution similar to that of the Church in Francoist Spain, while some cardinals wanted a plurality of Catholic parties, possibly including a communist one), actively supported Christian Democracy and the so-called "political unity of Catholics".

However, both Waldensians and Jews have played an important role in Italian politics. While several Catholic-inspired parties also rose to political prominence after Christian Democracy's dissolution in 1994 (from the new Italian People's Party to Democracy is Freedom, from the Christian Democratic Centre to the Union of the Centre, from Forza Italia to the new Forza Italia), Waldensians have usually been active in "secular" parties, especially the Italian Socialist Party, Italian Communist Party and, more recently, the Democratic Party, which is also home to former left-wing Christian Democrats. More recently, a group of conservative Pentecostals set up the Extended Christian Pact party. Also Jews have mostly been active in "secular" parties, but they have recently been more divided. Valdo Spini, a Waldensian, was minister in 1993–1994, while Lucio Malan, a conservative Waldensian, is currently the leader of Brothers of Italy in the Senate.

== Freedom of religion ==
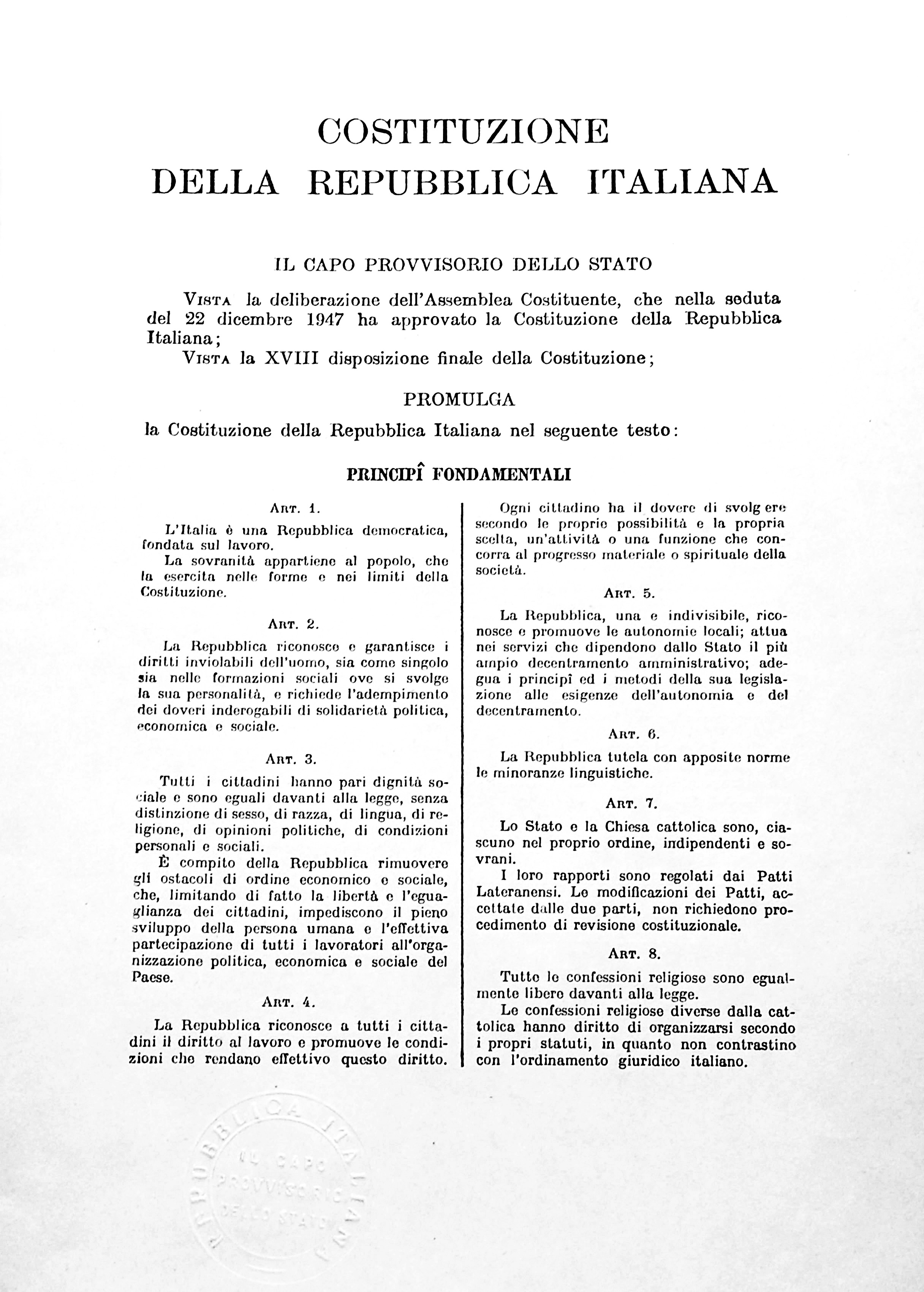
One of three original copies of the Constitution of Italy, now in the custody of Historical Archives of the President of the Republic. Freedom of religion is recognised, with "all religious denominations" having "the right of self-organisation according to their own statutes, provided these do not conflict with Italian law"; "[t]heir relations with the state are regulated by law, based on agreements with their respective representatives" (article 8).

The Constitution of Italy recognises the Catholic Church and the state as "independent and sovereign, each within its own sphere" (article 7), in respect of the liberal principle of separation of church and state. In particular, the Lateran Treaty of 1929 (signed under Benito Mussolini), which gave a special status to the Church, is recognised and modifications "accepted by both parties" to such treaty are allowed without the need of constitutional amendments. In fact, the treaty was later modified by a new agreement between the state and the Church in 1984 (under Prime Minister Bettino Craxi), according to which Catholicism ceased to be the state religion. However, only the Catholic Church has a concordat with the Republic.

Freedom of religion is also recognised, with "all religious denominations" having "the right of self-organisation according to their own statutes, provided these do not conflict with Italian law"; "[t]heir relations with the state are regulated by law, based on agreements with their respective representatives" (article 8). Having an agreement with the Italian government is not needed in order to appoint chaplains in hospitals and jails and to be partially financed by taxpayers' money. Agreements are by no means a right of individual religious denominations and are determined by political choice. Since 1984, the Italian government has signed fourteen agreements and thirteen have been approved by the Italian Parliament and signed into law, including the following:

- Union of Methodist and Waldensian Churches (1984/1984; modified in 1993/1993 and 2007/2009);
- Evangelical Christian Churches Assemblies of God in Italy (1986/1988);
- Italian Union of Seventh-day Adventist Christian Churches (1986/1988; modified in 1996/1996 and 2007/2009);
- Union of Jewish Communities in Italy (1987/1989; modified in 1996/1996);
- Baptist Evangelical Christian Union of Italy (1993/1995; modified in 2010/2012);
- Evangelical Lutheran Church in Italy (1993/1995);
- Sacred Orthodox Archdiocese of Italy and Exarchate of Southern Europe (2007/2012);
- The Church of Jesus Christ of Latter-day Saints in Italy (2007/2012);
- Apostolic Church in Italy (2007/2012);
- Italian Buddhist Union (2007/2012);
- Italian Hindu Union (2007/2012);
- Soka Gakkai Italian Buddhist Institute (2015/2016);
- Association "Church of England (2019/2021).

Additionally, there is one agreement endorsed by the government, but not yet signed into law:

- Christian Congregation of Jehovah's Witnesses in Italy (endorsed in 2000; modified in 2007).

Under the eight per thousand system, Italian taxpayers can choose to whom devolve a compulsory "eight per thousand tax" of 0.8% from their annual income tax return between an organised religion recognised by Italy or, alternatively, to a welfare spending scheme run by the government. In 2021, the latest available fiscal year, 11.6 million taxpayers (27.9%) chose the Catholic Church, 0.5 million (1.2%) the Union of Methodist and Waldensian Churches, 0.18 million (0.4%) the Italian Buddhist Union, 0.08 million (0.2%) the Soka Gakkai Italian Buddhist Institute, 0.05 million (0.1%) the Union of Jewish Communities in Italy, 0.04 million (0.1%) the Evangelical Christian Churches Assemblies of God in Italy, 0.04 million (0.1%) the Sacred Orthodox Archdiocese of Italy and Exarchate of Southern Europe and so on. The "eight per thousand tax" has thus disproportionately helped some minor denominations, particularly Waldensians.

In 2023, Italy was scored 4 out of 4 for religious freedom.

== See also ==
- Christianity in Italy
- Catholic Church in Italy
- Eastern Orthodoxy in Italy
- Oriental Orthodoxy in Italy
- Protestantism in Italy
- History of the Jews in Italy
- Islam in Italy
- Buddhism in Italy
- Hinduism in Italy
- Sikhism in Italy
- Baháʼí Faith in Italy
- Neopaganism in Italy
- Irreligion in Italy
- List of Italian religious minority politicians

== Bibliography ==
- Giordan, Giuseppe; Guglielmi, Marco (2018). "Be Fruitful and Multiply … Fast! The Spread of Orthodox Churches in Italy". Congregations in Europe. Cham: Springer. pp. 53–69. ISBN 9783319772615.
- Kiminas, Demetrius (2009). The Ecumenical Patriarchate: A History of Its Metropolitanates with Annotated Hierarch Catalogs. Wildside Press LLC. ISBN 9781434458766.
- Parlato, Vittorio (2010). "Le chiese ortodosse in Italia, oggi". Studi Urbinati, A - Scienze giuridiche, politiche ed economiche. 61 (3): 483–501.
