= Eight per thousand =

Italian tax for organized religion

Eight per thousand (Italian: otto per mille) is an Italian law under which Italian taxpayers devolve a compulsory 8 ‰ = 0.8% (eight per mille, i.e. per thousand) from their annual income tax return to an organised religion recognised by Italy or, alternatively, to a state-run social assistance scheme.

On the IRE form, people have the option to declare a recipient. If they do not, the law stipulates that this undeclared amount be distributed among the normal recipients of such taxes in proportion to what they have already received from explicit declarations. In the period from 1990 to 2007, 42.7% expressed a choice, on average.

A similar scheme has been introduced in 2006 to fund entities that carry out socially relevant activities (for example, non-profit, scientific research) with five per thousand (5 ‰).

== History ==
The relations between Italy and the religious confessions in its territory can be traced back to the Statuto Albertino of 1848, which applied first to the Kingdom of Sardinia and then to the Kingdom of Italy. Its first article declared the "Roman Catholic Apostolic religion" the only state religion and granted legal toleration to all other religious confessions then present.

Under the Lateran treaties of 1929, which were incorporated in the 1948 Constitution of the Italian Republic, the State paid a small monthly salary, called the congrua, to Catholic clergymen as compensation for the nationalization of Church properties at the time of the unification of Italy. This ended on 31 December 1986, with the entry into force, as a result of a 1984 agreement between the government and the Holy See of the "eight per thousand" system.

== Current status ==
As of 2020 there are 14 possible beneficiaries of the tax:

- The State itself
- Catholic Church
- Union of Methodist and Waldensian Churches
- Italian Union of Seventh-day Adventist Christian Churches
- Assemblies of God in Italy
- Union of Italian Jewish Communities
- Lutheran Evangelical Church in Italy
- Baptist Evangelical Christian Union of Italy
- Greek Orthodox Archdiocese of Italy
- Apostolic Church in Italy
- Italian Buddhist Union
- Italian Hindu Union
- Soka Gakkai Italian Buddhist Institute
- Church of England

In addition an agreement has been signed with the Jehovah's Witnesses, but it has not yet received parliamentary ratification. The ECHR condemned the delay in 2026.

The Church of Jesus Christ of Latter-day Saints, in spite of having made an agreement on 4 April 2007, ratified by Law 127 of 30 July 2012, is refusing to participate in the division of the funds.

At present it is not possible to designate an Islamic organization, despite Italy's population of over 1.4 million Muslims. Issues cited include a lack of a single central authority for the religion, concerns over Islamist extremist organizations being the recipients of funds, and Muslim beliefs on polygamy, education and women's rights that potentially contradict the Constitution.

== Utilisation ==
Although the 1985 law on the matter declared that the state's portion of the proceeds was to be devoted to extraordinary expenses, such as world hunger, natural disasters and refugees, since 2004 a large proportion is employed for general purposes. In 2004, €80 million out of a total of about €100 million were thus employed, leading to criticism of the fact that part of it was used to finance the Italian military mission in Iraq. Because of its financial situation in 2011, the government decided to utilize the entire sum of about €145 million for purposes other than those indicated in the 1985 law: for instance, €57,277,063 were spent on improving the prison infrastructure.

The purposes for which the religious groups may use their portions are laid down in the agreements entered into with the government. In the case of the Catholic Church, the purposes are specified in article 48 of the 1985 law: "worship needs of the people, support of the clergy, charitable activities in favour of Italian society and the Third World". Each year the Italian Episcopal Conference publishes the proportions it assigns under various headings. Thus at its meeting in May 2012 it approved the following distribution (in thousands of euros):

- 1,148,076 Total amount received (100.0%)
- 479,226 Worship and pastoral work (41.7%)
  - 156,000 To the dioceses (for worship and pastoral work) (13.6%)
  - 190,000 Buildings for worship (16.5%)
    - 125,000 New buildings for worship (10.9%)
    - 65,000 Safeguarding cultural property of the Church (5.7%)
  - 64,226 Fund for catechesis and Christian education (5.6%)
  - 12,000 Regional ecclesiastical tribunals (1.0%)
  - 57,000 Needs of national importance (5.0%)
- 255,000 Charitable activities (22.2%)
  - 125,000 To the dioceses (for charity) (10.9%)
  - 85,000 Third World (7.4%)
  - 45,000 Needs of national importance (3.9%)
- 363,850 Financial support of the clergy (31.7%)
- 50,000 Reserve for future use for worship, pastoral work and charity (4.4%)

The financial support for the clergy brings their salary up to a certain level, such as €852.93 a month for a priest at the beginning of his service, and €1,308.57 a month for a bishop at the maximum of his biennial increments (2007 figures).

== Choices expressed by taxpayers ==
For the first fifteen years of the system there was a gradual increase of the percentage of those who chose their contributions to go to the Catholic Church and a corresponding diminution of those who chose the State as beneficiary. Of those who exercised a choice, 76.17% opted for the Catholic Church in 1990, increasing to 89.81% in 2004 and falling to 86.05% in 2006 and 85.01% in 2007. Since in 2007, for instance, only 43.50% of those who declared their incomes expressed a choice, those who did indicate the Catholic Church as beneficiary were less than 37% of the taxpayers, a figure much lower than the proportion of Italians who declare themselves Catholics, which corresponded rather to the proportion opting for the Church among those who did indicate a choice. Declarations in favour of the State, which were 22.31% in 1990, dropped to their lowest ever level of 7.60% in 2005, recovering later and reaching 11.95% in 2007.

The eight-per-thousand tax has significantly helped the Piedmontese Waldensians, a Protestant community whose origins predate the Reformation, the Waldensians have only about 25,000 enlisted members but about 412,000 Italians support them and their charitable works.

== See also ==
- Church tax
- Tithe
