= Eastern Orthodoxy in Italy =

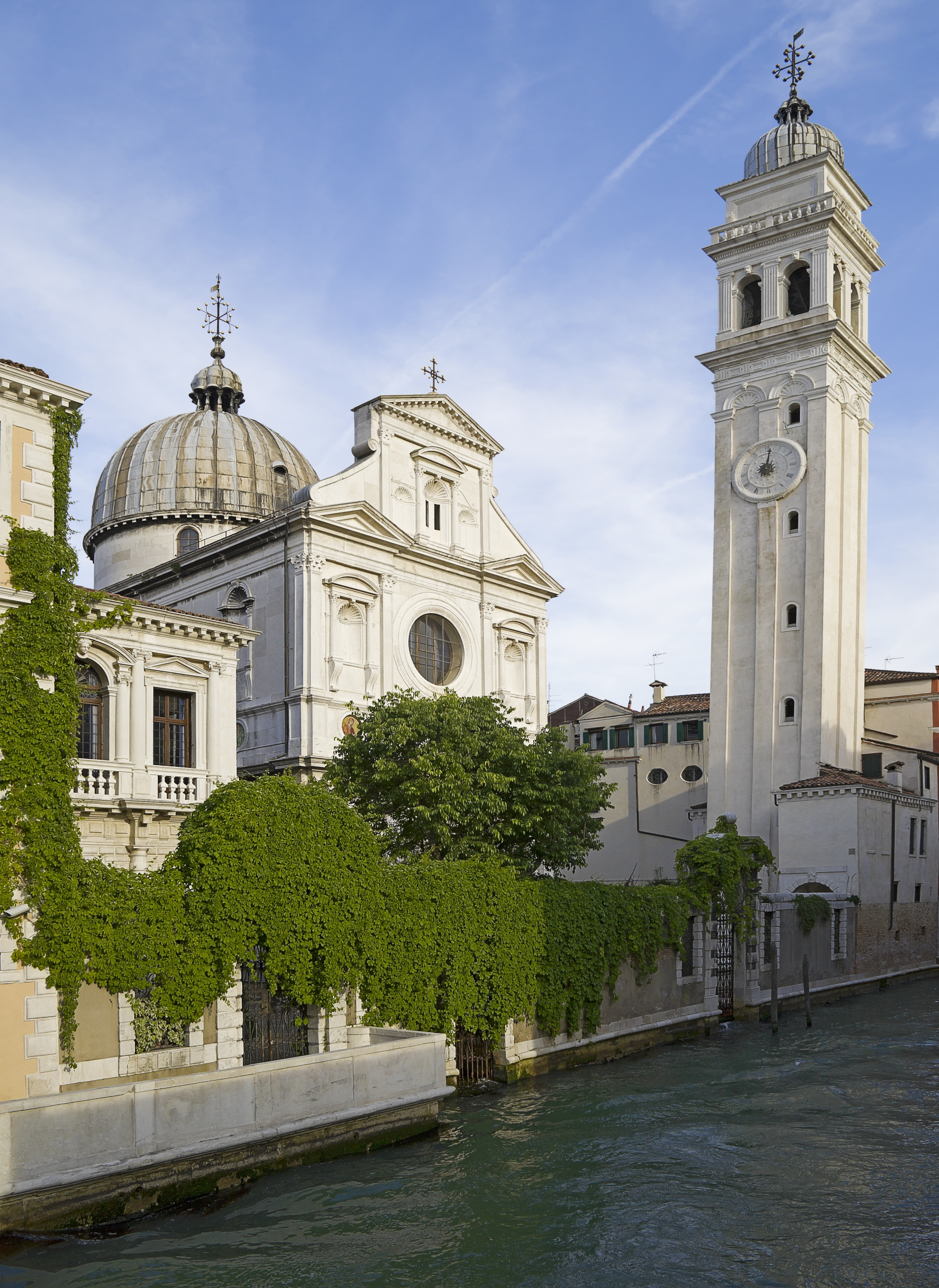
Cathedral of St George, Venice (Greek Orthodox)

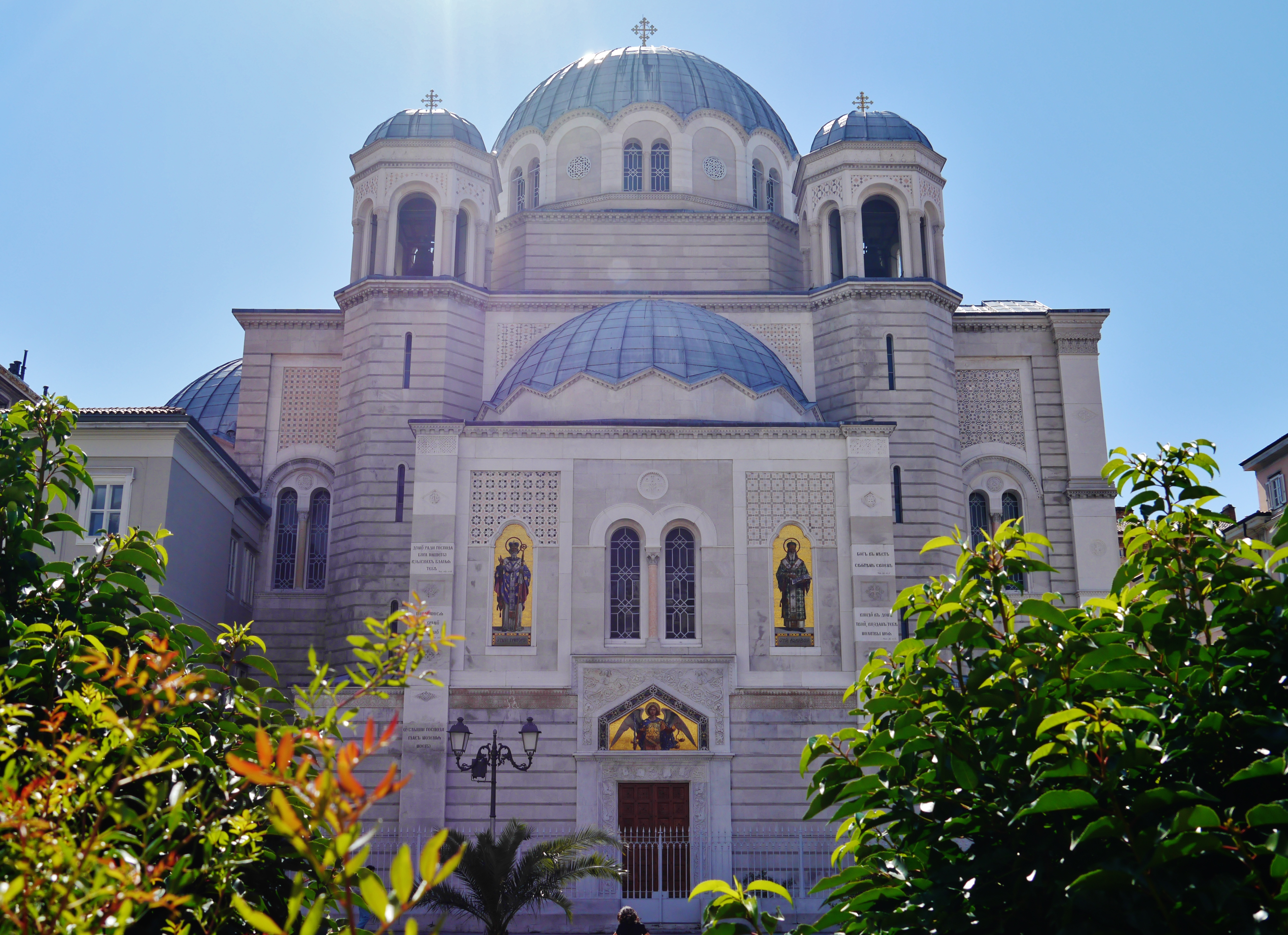
Serbian Orthodox Church of Saint Spyridon in Trieste

Eastern Orthodoxy in Italy refers to adherents, religious communities, institutions and organizations of Eastern Orthodox Christianity in Italy. In 2014, there were 14 distinctive Eastern Orthodox jurisdictions on the territory of Italy, some of them belonging to canonical Eastern Orthodox churches, while others are classified as independent (noncanonical). First session of the Council of Canonical Orthodox Bishops in Italy was held in 2009.

The main canonical Eastern Orthodox churches and ecclesiastical jurisdictions in Italy are as follows:

- Greek Orthodox Archdiocese of Italy and Exarchate of Southern Europe, a diocese of the Ecumenical Patriarchate of Constantinople, officially recognized by the Italian government under the otto per mille scheme,
- Serbian Orthodox Vicariate of Italy, under the jurisdiction of Serbian Orthodox Eparchy of Austria and Switzerland,
- Romanian Orthodox Diocese of Italy, a diocese of the Romanian Orthodox Metropolis of Western and Southern Europe ,
- Patriarchal parishes in Italy, a jurisdiction of the Russian Orthodox Church in Italy,
- Parishes of the Bulgarian Orthodox Church in Italy,
- Parishes of the Georgian Orthodox Church in Italy.
- Parishes of the Macedonian Orthodox Church - Metropolitanate of Europe.

Other Eastern Orthodox jurisdictions in Italy are:

- Metropolitan of Aquilea, an independent organization founded in 1978 by Archimandrite Evloghios Hessler, the head of a Russian Church in Italy, following the Russian tradition, with followers in Italy, Switzerland, France, Spain, and Germany,
- Parishes of Greek Old Calendarists in Italy

== See also ==
- Saint Spyridon Church, Trieste
- Religion in Italy
- Christianity in Italy
- Catholic Church in Italy
- Protestantism in Italy
- Schism of Montaner

== Bibliography ==
- Giordan, Giuseppe; Guglielmi, Marco (2018). "Be Fruitful and Multiply … Fast! The Spread of Orthodox Churches in Italy". Congregations in Europe. Cham: Springer. pp. 53–69. ISBN 9783319772615.
- Gordon-Melton, John (2010). "Chiesa Ortodossa in Italia". Religions of the World: A Comprehensive Encyclopedia of Beliefs and Practices (2nd ed.). ABC-CLIO. pp. 546–547. ISBN 9781598842043.
- Kiminas, Demetrius (2009). The Ecumenical Patriarchate: A History of Its Metropolitanates with Annotated Hierarch Catalogs. Wildside Press LLC. ISBN 9781434458766.
- Parlato, Vittorio (2010). "Le chiese ortodosse in Italia, oggi". Studi Urbinati, A - Scienze giuridiche, politiche ed economiche. 61 (3): 483–501.
