= Federation of Evangelical Churches in Italy =

Ecumenical Protestant body in Italy

The Federation of Evangelical Churches in Italy (Italian: Federazione delle Chiese Evangeliche in Italia, FCEI) is an ecumenical Protestant body in Italy.

The FCEI, formed in 1967, includes the historical Protestant churches of Italy, notably including the Union of Methodist and Waldensian Churches (a united denomination comprising the Waldensian Evangelical Church and the Methodist Evangelical Church), the Baptist Evangelical Christian Union of Italy, the Lutheran Evangelical Church in Italy, and other minor churches. The FCEI, whose current president is Waldensian pastor Daniele Garrone, has a total membership of 140,000.

== Members ==
Full members

- Union of Methodist and Waldensian Churches
  - Waldensian Evangelical Church – 30,000 members
  - Methodist Evangelical Church – 5,000 members
- Baptist Evangelical Christian Union of Italy – 15,000 members
- Lutheran Evangelical Church in Italy – 7,000 members
- The Salvation Army in Italy – 2,000 members
- Communion of Free Churches in Italy (Plymouth Brethren) – 10,000 members (Note: Not to be confused with the Evangelical Christian Church of the Brethren – 20,000 members)
- Apostolic Church in Italy (Pentecostal) – 10,000 members
- St. Andrew's Church of Scotland (Presbyterian) in Rome

Observer members

- Federation of Pentecostal Churches – 50,000 members
- Italian Union of Seventh-day Adventist Christian Churches – 25,000 members
- Association Christian Communities

== Presidents ==
- Mario Sbaffi (Methodist, 1969–1973)
- Aldo Comba (Waldensian, 1973–1976)
- Piero Bensi (Baptist, 1976–1982)
- Aurelio Sbaffi (Methodist, 1982–1988)
- Giorgio Bouchard (Waldensian, 1988–1994)
- Domenico Tomasetto (Baptist, 1994–2000)
- Gianni Long (Waldensian, 2000–2006)
- Domenico Maselli (Waldensian, 2006–2009)
- Massimo Aquilante (Methodist, 2009–2015)
- Luca Maria Negro (Baptist, 2015–2021)
- Daniele Garrone (Waldensian, 2021–present)

== See also ==
- Religion in Italy
- Christianity in Italy
- Protestantism in Italy
- List of Italian religious minority politicians
