= Federation of Pentecostal Churches =

Federation of Pentecostal Churches may refer to:

- Federation of Pentecostal Churches (Germany)
- Federation of Pentecostal Churches (Italy)
