= Domenico Maselli =

Italian politician

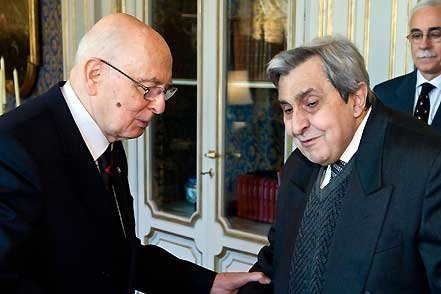
Domenico Maselli (right) with Giorgio Napolitano.

Domenico Maselli (24 December 1933 – 4 March 2016) was an Italian politician and pastor.

== Biography ==
Maselli was born in Alessandria. He was President of the Federation of Evangelical Churches in Italy. He was a member of the Waldensian Evangelical Church and a pastor in Lucca.

== Politics ==
A long-time member of the Italian Socialist Party (PSI), he later joined the Social Christians and the Democrats of the Left. He was a deputy from 1996 to 2001.
