= Christian Congregation of Jehovah's Witnesses in Italy =

Italian section of Jehovah's Witnesses

The Christian Congregation of Jehovah's Witnesses in Italy (Italian: Congregazione cristiana dei testimoni di Geova in Italia) is the Italian section of Jehovah's Witnesses, who have been active in the country since 1903. The congregation is recognized by the Italian government both as a juridical person and a religious denomination. The congregation also signed two agreements with the Italian government in 2000 and 2007, according to article 8 of the Constitution of Italy, but neither of them has been approved by the Italian Parliament and signed into law yet.

The congregation counts 250,000 full members or 414,000 including adherents (especially participants to the yearly Memorial).

As a result, the congregation is the second-largest organized Christian denomination by number of members in the country, after the Catholic Church. Also, Italy has the fifth largest population of Jehovah's Witnesses (after the United States, Mexico, Brazil and Nigeria) and has one the highest shares of population in the world (0.4%).

== See also ==
- Jehovah's Witnesses by country
