= Protestantism in Italy =

Largest minority of Christian denominations in Italy

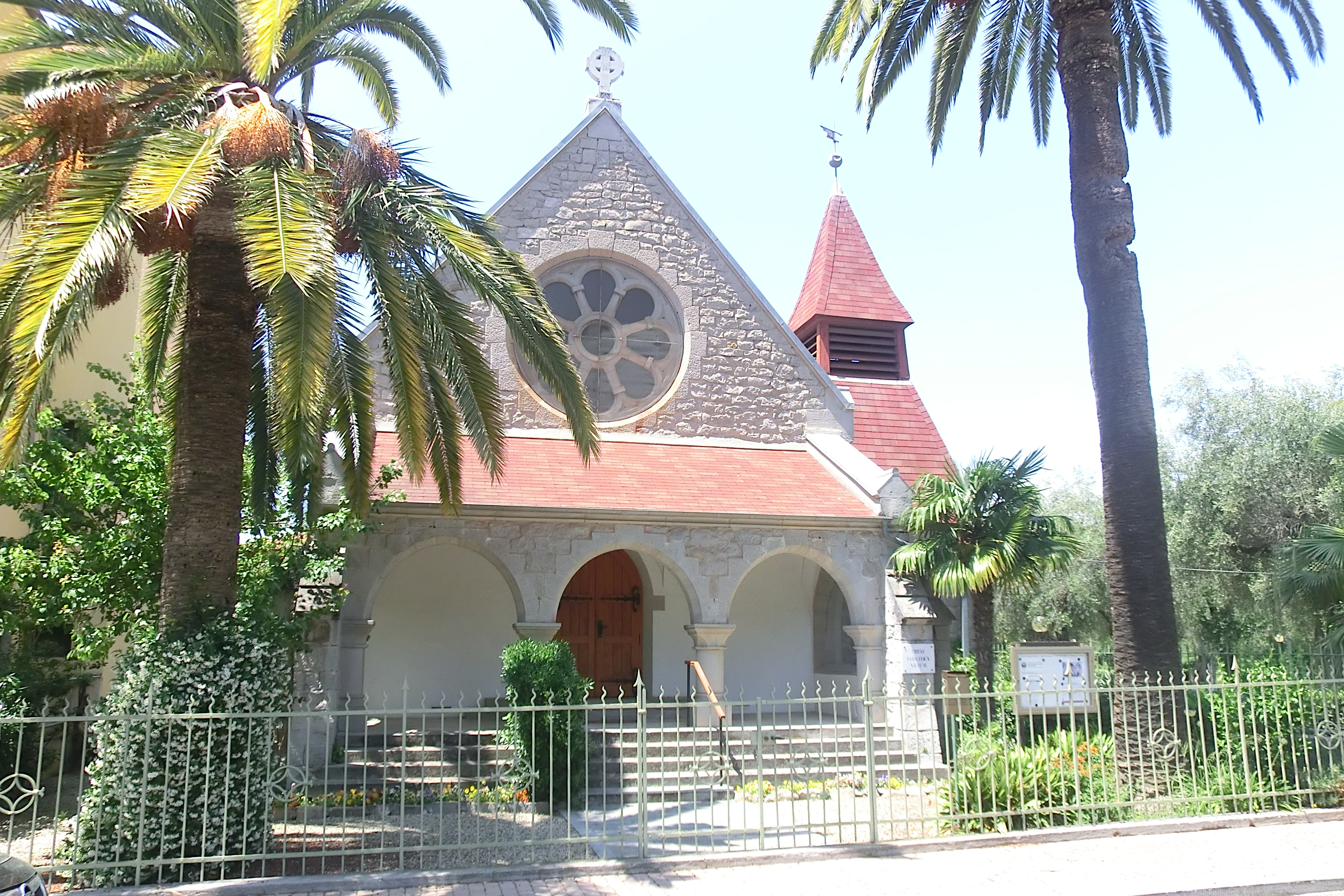
Protestant church in Bordighera, Liguria

Protestantism in Italy comprises a minority of the country's religious population.

The Catholic Church is by far the largest Christian denomination, but Protestantism has a significant presence. While the CESNUR (an Italian think tank devoted to religious studies, especially on new religions in Italy) asserts that there are 442,377 Protestants in Italy as of 2014, due to the difficulty of keeping accurate records regarding the proclaimed religion of immigrants to the country, that number likely reflects, at best, only an approximation of the actual number of Protestants in the country.

In the year 2000, there were 600,000 Protestant adherents in Italy. This was a steady increase from the 1970s and 1980s which ranged between 400 and 500,000. According to a 2010 study by the Pew Research Center, Italy had a Christian population of approximately 51.5 million, representing 85.1% of the national population. Of these, around 800,000 identified as Protestant, constituting the country's second-largest Christian group and the thirteenth-largest Protestant population in Europe by national share.

== History ==
The oldest known of Italy's Protestant churches, the Waldensian Evangelical Church, is a pre-Lutheran Protestant denomination, which was founded by Peter Waldo in the 12th century and, after the Protestant Reformation, adhered to Calvinist theology and became the Italian branch of the Reformed churches. The church's heartland is a cluster of Alpine valleys, the so-called "Waldensian Valleys" (Val Pellice, Val Chisone and Valle Germanasca), in western Piedmont. Since 1975, the Waldensians have formed a united church with the Methodist Evangelical Church in Italy. The ideas of Girolamo Savonarola also had spread around Florence around the 15th century.

The Reformation in Italy began at the end of the 15th century and quickly collapsed at the beginning of the 17th century. Its development was hindered by stern repression by the Inquisition of the Catholic Church. Groups of Italian Protestants had more comfortable lives in Switzerland, particularly in the Graubünden region.

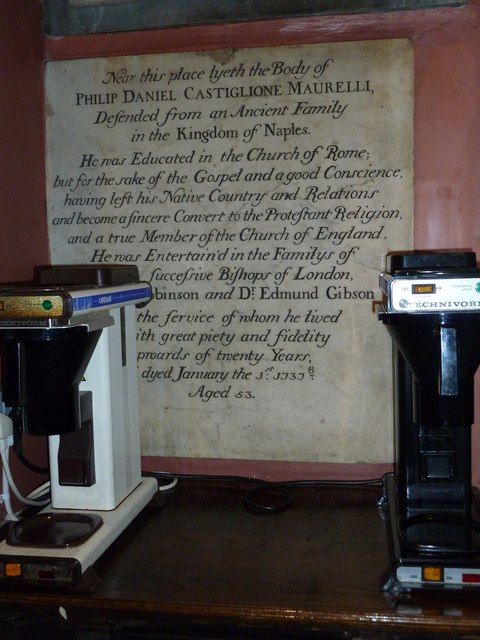
Gravestone of an Italian convert to the Church of England in All Saints Church, Fulham

On 17 February 1848, Charles Albert, king of Piedmont-Sardinia, granted religious freedom and civic emancipation to the Waldensians. Freedom of worship and equality of civic and political rights were later extended to Jews and to the other Italian states that were progressively annexed to Piedmont-Sardinia during the process of unification of Italy. Newer Waldensian congregations sprang up as well as the Free Christian Church (which lasted from 1852 to 1904) and the Evangelical Christian Church of the Brethren. Meanwhile, British and American missionaries began to preach and establish Anglican, Methodist and Baptist churches.

In the early 20th century, missionaries spread the Pentecostal gospel throughout the country. Nowadays, most of those resulting Pentecostal congregations belong to the Assemblies of God in Italy, the Federation of Pentecostal Churches, and the Apostolic Church in Italy.

The Federation of Evangelical Churches in Italy (FCEI), formed in 1967, comprises all the historical Protestant churches of Italy (including the Union of Methodist and Waldensian Churches, the Lutheran Evangelical Church in Italy, the Baptist Evangelical Christian Union of Italy, and some minor churches), plus two observer members with a large following (the Federation of Pentecostal Churches and the Italian Union of Seventh-day Adventist Christian Churches).

Protestantism, especially in its Pentecostal forms, is thus on the rise. The Assemblies of God have the majority of their communities in the South. According to Caritas Italiana, in 2012 the North of Italy was home to 850 "African Neo-Pentecostal churches".

== See also ==
- Religion in Italy
- Christianity in Italy
- Catholic Church in Italy
- List of Italian religious minority politicians
- Conference of Protestant Churches in Latin Countries of Europe
- Waldensians
- Waldensian Evangelical Church
- Peter Martyr Vermigli
