= Buddhism in Italy =

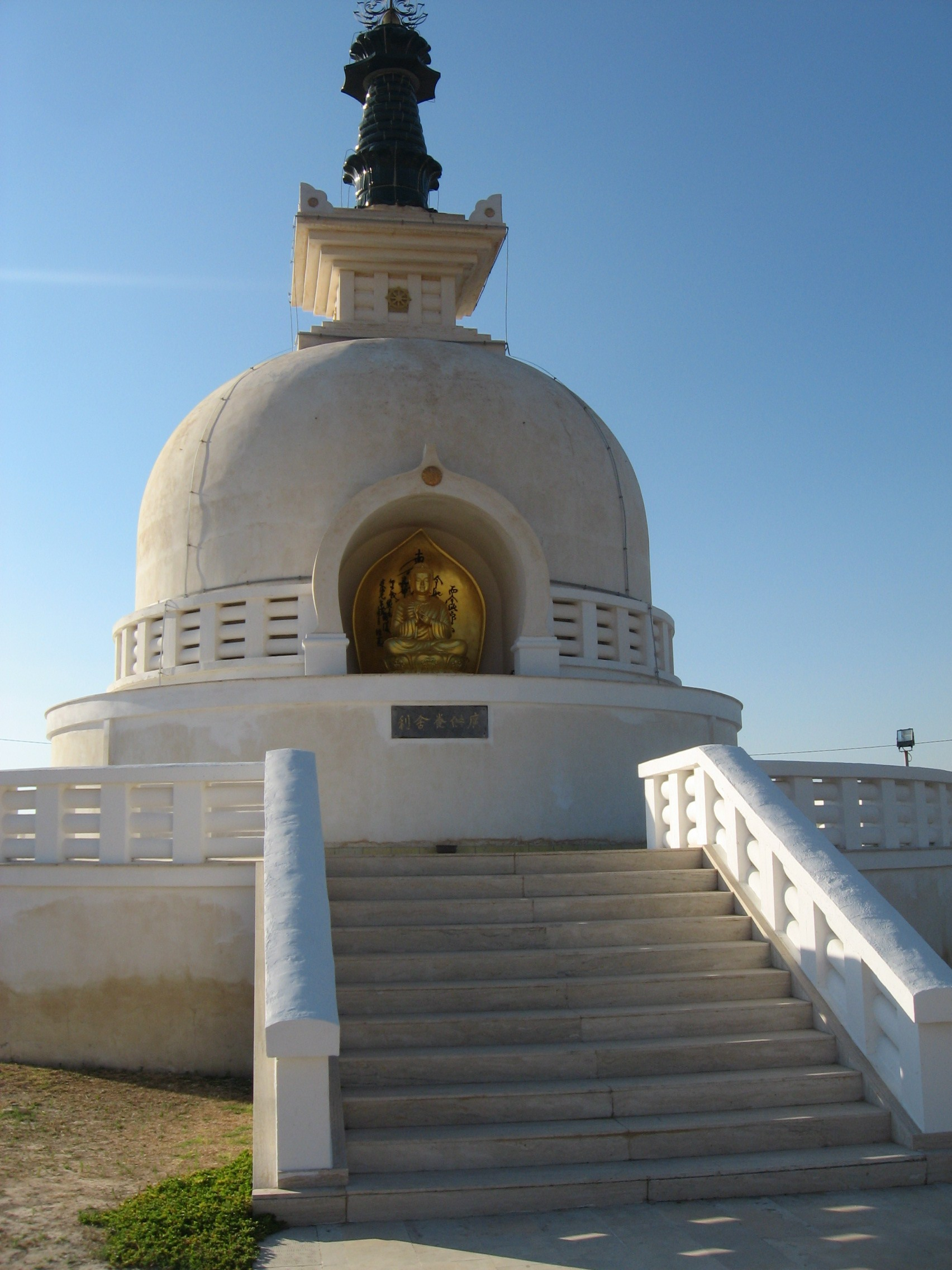
Peace Pagoda in Comiso

Buddhism is the third most spread religion in Italy, next to Christianity and Islam. In the country there are 358,000 Buddhists, about 0.6% of the total population.

== History ==
According to some sources, Buddhism might have been practiced in Italy, although marginally, already in ancient Rome, likely disappeared with the persecution of pagans in the late Roman Empire.

The contemporary Buddhist presence in Italy instead begins to be known in the 1960s, with the first attempts to ground some Buddhist centers. Between the oldest we can count the one of Engaku Taino and the Fudenji of Taiten Guareschi, disciple of Taisen Deshimaru. In 1960 is founded the Buddhist Italian Association (Associazione Buddhista Italiana) and in 1967 begins the publishing of the review Buddhismo Scientifico.

From the years 1984-1989, the Foundation for the Preservation of the Mahayana Tradition of Thubten Yeshe and Thubten Zopa Rinpoche was based at the Istituto Lama Tzong Khapa in the Tuscan village of Pomaia.

The Italian Buddhist Union, member of the European Buddhist Union, was founded in Milan in 1985, received recognition by the President of the Italian Republic in 1991 and signed an agreement with the Italian government in 2007, in accordance with article 8 of the Italian Constitution (which regulates the relations with religious minorities), and the agreement became law in 2012.

The UBI is acknowledged as an association with juridical figure and coordinates the 44 principal centers in Italy in the tradition Theravada, Mahayana, Vajrayana which hold the practice and the sharing of the traditional teaching.

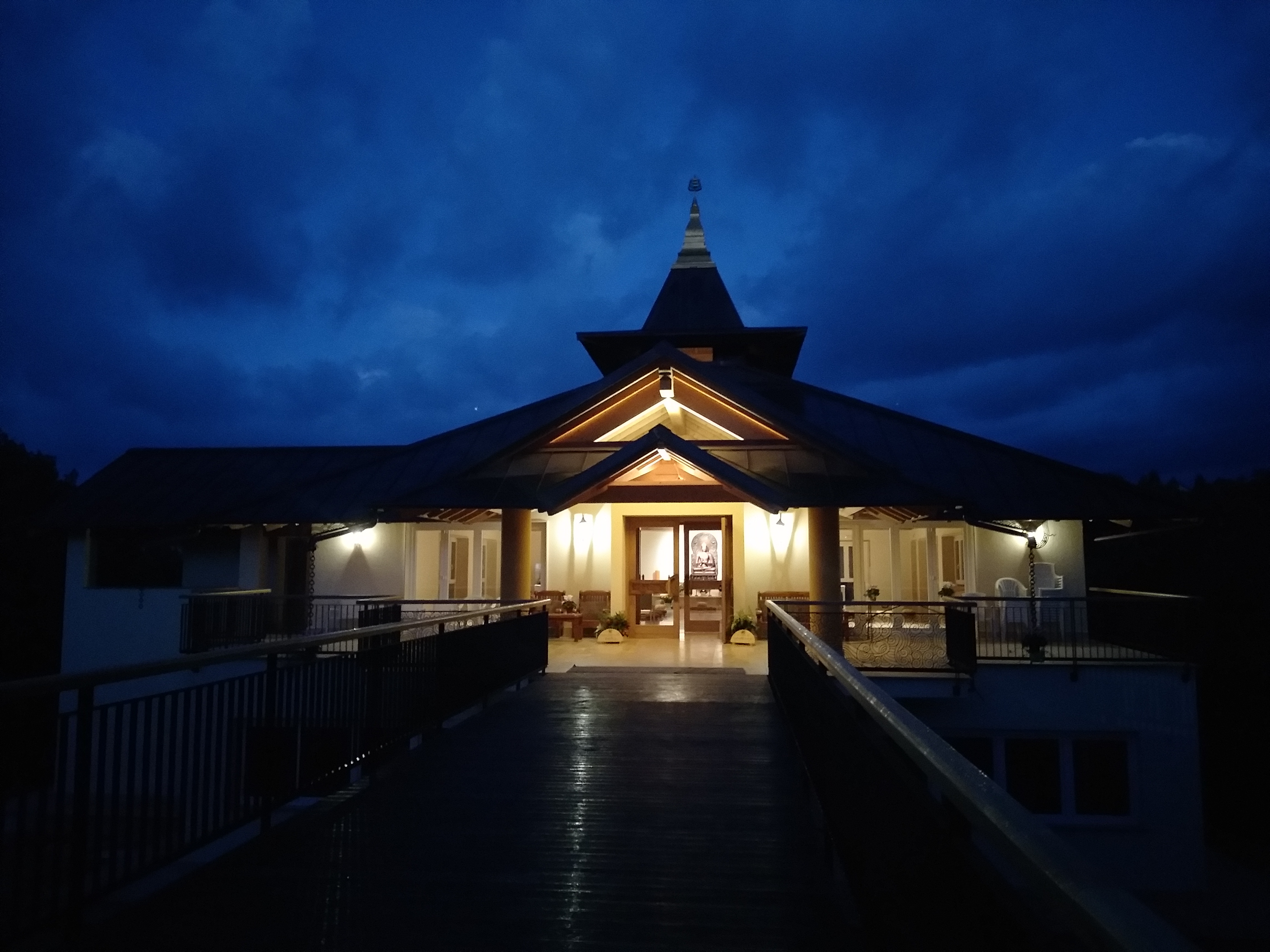
Santacittarama Buddhist Monastery

Between the most important Buddhist centers of Italy there is the Soto Zen center "L'Arco", in Rome, the already cited Scaramuccia of Luigi Mario Engaku Taino, in Scaramuccia, Orvieto; even in Rome, the lay Buddhist association laica A.Me.Co for the practice of Theravada Buddhism, founded and directed by the lay Dhamma teacher Corrado Pensa, and there is also Santacittarama, Theravādin monastery of the Forest's Sangha located near Rome; In Milan, the biggest Zen center is the Zen Buddhist monastery Ensoji il Cerchio, founded and guided by the Zen master Carlo Zendo Tetsugen Serra; in Pomaia, the Tibetan Buddhism finds one of the biggest center in Europe, the Lama Tzong Khapa Institute. The Vajrayana Buddhism is represented, among others, by the centers of the Diamond Way Buddhism of the Kagyu school, spread in almost all the Italian regions.

Even the Japanese Buddhist denominations affiliated to Nichiren Buddhism are represented in the UBI: the temple of Nichiren Shu Renkoji, in Cereseto, near Novara, guided by the master Shoryo Tarabini, and the association Nipponzan Myohonji, which provided to the grounding of the biggest stupa in Italy, the Peace Pagoda in Comiso (Sicily). In 2014 also Honmon Butsuryū-shū, or HBS, with its Kofuji temple in Florence, has become part of UBI.

In June 2015, the SGI-Italy (Soka Gakkai Italian Buddhist Institute) was recognized by the Italian government with a special accord under Italian Constitution Article 8, acknowledging it as an official religion of Italy and eligible to receive direct taxpayer funding for its religious and social activities. It also recognizes the Soka Gakkai as a "Concordat" (It: "Intesa") that grants the religions status in "a special 'club' of denominations consulted by the government in certain occasions, allowed to appoint chaplains in the army - a concordat is not needed for appointing chaplains in hospitals and jails - and, perhaps more importantly, to be partially financed by taxpayers' money." Eleven other religious denominations share this status.

== Bibliography ==
- Bikkhu Nanajivako (1989). The Technicalization of Buddhism: Fascism and Buddhism in Italy (I). Giuseppe Tucci - Julius Evola. Buddhist Study Review 6 (1), 27-38
- Bikkhu Nanajivako (1989). The Technicalization of Buddhism: Fascism and Buddhism in Italy (II). Buddhist Study Review 6 (2), 102-115
- Bikkhu Nanajivako (1990). The Technicalization of Buddhism: Fascism and Buddhism in Italy (III). Buddhist Study Review 7 (1-2), 3-18
