= Methodist Evangelical Church in Italy =

- Chiesa Evangelica Metodista in Italia
- Type: Protestant
- Orientation: Methodist
- Scripture: Christian Bible
- Theology: Methodist theology
- Polity: Congregationalist
- Associations: Union of Methodist and Waldensian Churches; Federation of Evangelical Churches in Italy; World Council of Churches
- Territory: Italy
- Origin: 1962
- Members: 4,000
- Official website: Official website

The Methodist Evangelical Church in Italy (Italian: Chiese Evangelica Metodista in Italia), known also as Italian Methodist Church (Chiese Metodista Italiana), is a Protestant church in the Methodist tradition active in Italy that is in full communion with the historical Waldensian Evangelical Church in the Union of Methodist and Waldensian Churches. It part of the World Methodist Council.

The first Italian Methodist churches were founded by British and American missionaries in the 19th century. The missionary work became difficult during the Fascist regime, but finally in 1946 the Methodist Evangelical Church of Italy was born as a district of the Annual Conference of the Methodist Church of Great Britain. In 1962 the Methodist Church became fully independent and its structure was organized with a non-episcopal congregationalist polity.

In 1975 the Methodist Church was united with the Waldensian Evangelical Church, resulting in the Union of Methodist and Waldensian Churches. The two churches have since been one church, governed by one synod, but they have maintained their own identity, ecumenical relations, administration and projects. In fact, contextually with the formation of the Union, the Action for the Methodist Evangelical Churches in Italy (Opera per le Chiese Evangeliche Metodiste in Italia) was established in order to maintain ecumenical relations and those with world Methodism, administer Methodist properties such as churches, and finance the work of pastors and deacons.

As of today, the Methodist Evangelical Church in Italy includes 4,000 members and 50 congregations.

== See also ==
- Religion in Italy
- Christianity in Italy
- Protestantism in Italy
- List of Italian religious minority politicians
