= Catholic Church in Italy =

- Italian: Chiesa cattolica in Italia
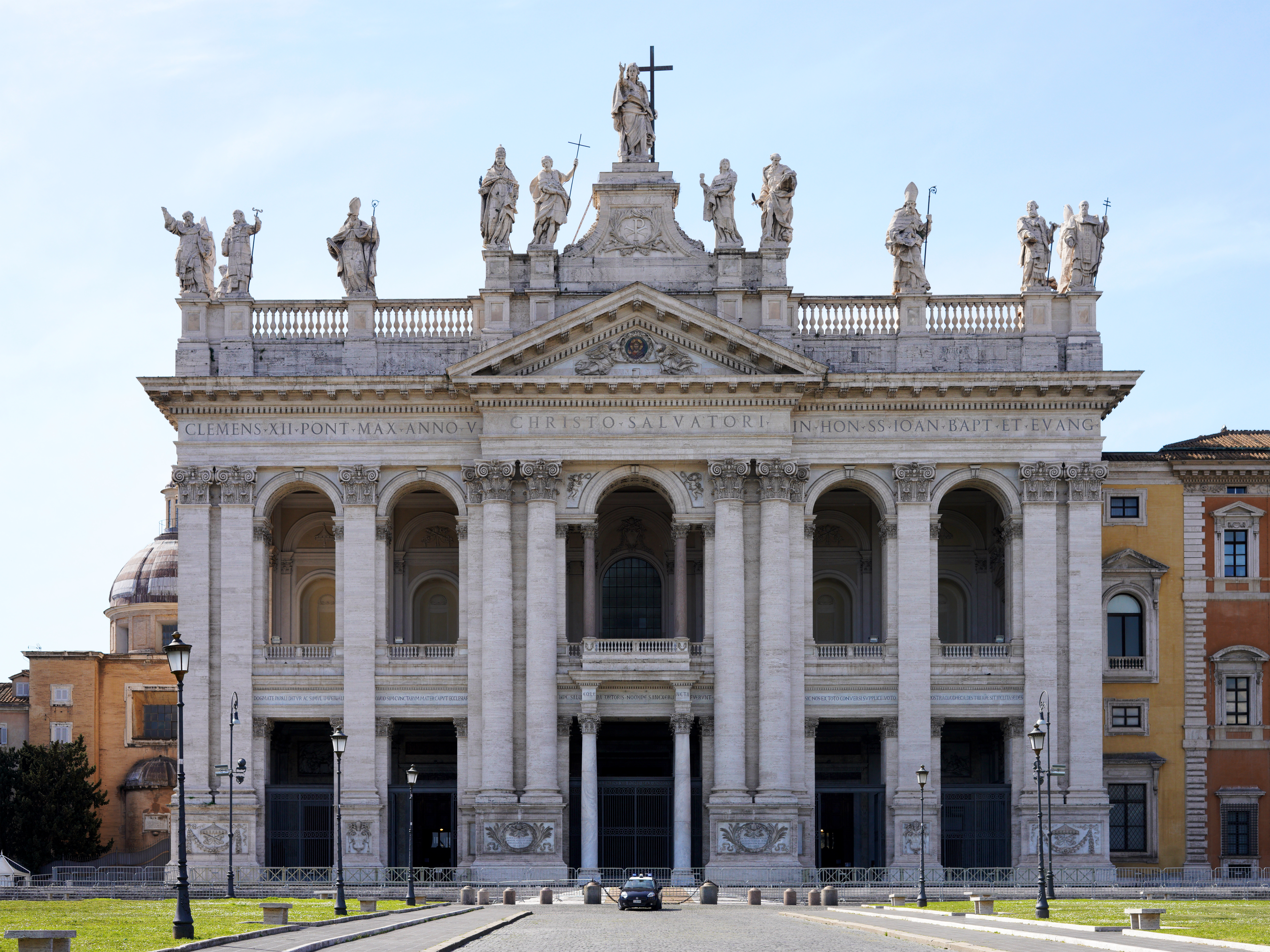
- Archbasilica of Saint John Lateran in Rome, the cathedra seat of the Pope as Primate of Italy.
- Type: National polity
- Classification: Catholic
- Orientation: Latin
- Scripture: Bible
- Theology: Catholic theology
- Polity: Episcopal
- Governance: Episcopal Conference of Italy
- Pope: Leo XIV
- President: Matteo Maria Zuppi
- Primate: Pope Leo XIV
- Apostolic Nuncio: Petar Rajič
- Region: Italy; Vatican City; San Marino
- Language: Italian, Latin
- Headquarters: Archbasilica of Saint John Lateran
- Founder: Apostles Peter and Paul
- Origin: 1st century Rome, Roman Empire
- Separations: Protestantism in Italy (16th century)
- Members: 57,000,000
- Official website: Episcopal Conference of Italy

The Italian Catholic Church, or Catholic Church in Italy, is part of the worldwide Catholic Church in communion with the Pope in Rome, under the Conference of Italian Bishops. The pope also serves as Primate of Italy and Bishop of Rome. In addition to the Italian Republic, two other sovereign states are included in Italian dioceses: San Marino and Vatican City. There are 225 dioceses in the Catholic Church in Italy; see further in this article and in the article List of Catholic dioceses in Italy.

The pope resides in Vatican City, enclaved in Rome. Having been a major centre for Christian pilgrimage since the Roman Empire, Rome is commonly regarded as the "home" of the Catholic Church, since it is where Saint Peter settled, ministered, served as bishop, and died. His relics are located in Rome along with Saint Paul's, among many other saints of Early Christianity.

Owing to the Italian Renaissance, church art in Italy is extraordinary, including works by Leonardo da Vinci, Michelangelo, Fra Carnevale, Gian Lorenzo Bernini, Sandro Botticelli, Tintoretto, Titian, Raphael, and Giotto, etc.

Italian church architecture is equally spectacular and historically important to Western culture, notably St. Peter's Basilica in Rome, Cathedral of St. Mark's in Venice, and Brunelleschi's Florence Cathedral, which includes the "Gates of Paradise" doors at the Baptistery by Lorenzo Ghiberti.

The status of the Catholic Church as the sole official religion in Italy ended in 1929, with the renegotiation of the Lateran Treaty.

== History ==
=== Origins ===
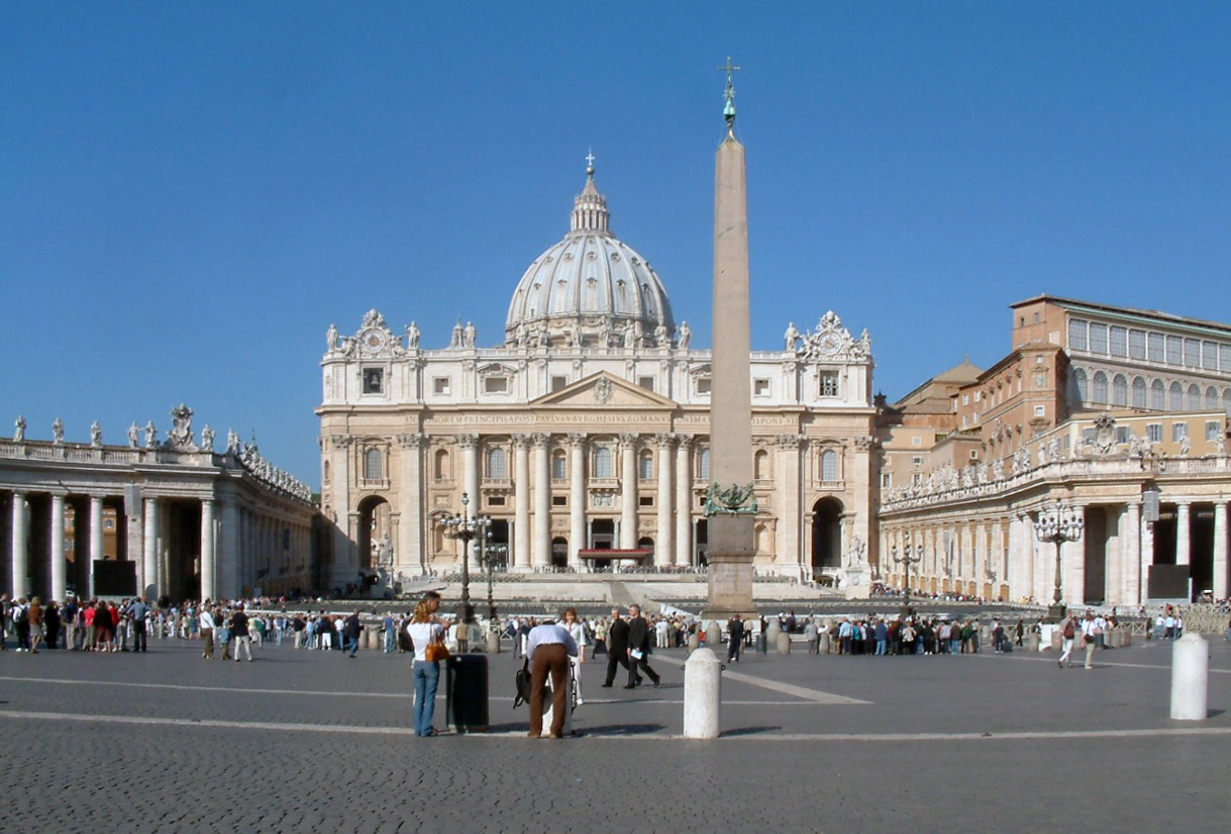
St Peter's Basilica and Vatican City, in Rome

Christianity arrived on the Italian peninsula in the first century, probably with unknown travellers, traders or soldiers. Paul the Apostle's Letter to the Romans is addressed to Roman Christians in the first century and attests to their presence in the city. Christians were also in touch with St. Peter and St. Paul the Apostle, both of whom went to Rome on mission and were eventually martyred there. One of the first Italian bishops and popes was Clement of Rome, who wrote a letter to the Christian community in Corinth (1 Clement) around AD 96.

=== Key figures in Italian Catholic history ===
Prior to the unification of Italy in 1861, the Catholic Church manifested its presence in the territories which formed that union, such as the Papal States, Tuscany and the Kingdom of the Two Sicilies.

Over its two thousand-year history, the Church grew in size and influence of Italy, producing and harboring (sometimes before martyrdom) some of the greatest leaders and movers of Catholic Christianity including Priscilla and Aquila; Ignatius of Antioch, martyred in Rome; Polycarp, martyred in Rome and a disciple of John the Evangelist; Agnes, Roman martyr; Lawrence, martyr; Justin Martyr, teacher and martyr; Hippolytus, priest and martyr; Cecilia, Roman martyr; Ambrose of Milan, bishop and Doctor of the Church; Jerome, theologian and Doctor of the Church; Benedict of Nursia, founder of the Benedictine order and of Western monasticism; Leo the Great, bishop of Rome and Doctor of the Church; Gregory the Great, bishop of Rome and Doctor of the Church; Augustine of Canterbury, Roman monk, Benedictine missionary to England, later English bishop; Urban II, pope or Bishop of Rome who called for the First Crusade; Anselm of Canterbury, Italian-born philosopher, Doctor of the Church and later English bishop; Francis of Assisi, mystic and founder of the Franciscans; Bonaventure of Bagnorea, Franciscan theologian and Doctor of the Church; Thomas Aquinas, Dominican theologian, philosopher, and Doctor of the Church; Dante, poet; Catherine of Siena, mystic, reformer, and Doctor of the Church; Monteverdi, composer; Robert Bellarmine of Tuscany, Jesuit theologian and Doctor of the Church; Antonio Vivaldi, priest and composer; Leo XIII, bishop of Rome and social reformer; Pius XII, bishop of Rome; John XXIII, bishop of Rome and initiator of Second Vatican Council, among many others.

One could add to this list the founders of various contemporary lay ecclesial movements, notably Luigi Giussani, founder of Communion and Liberation, and Chiara Lubich, founder of the Focolare Movement. Also, Andrea Riccardi, founder of the Community of Sant'Egidio, which is now one of the great faith-based organizations in the world.

== Data ==
In 2021, approximately 79.2% of the Italian population identifies as Catholic. Italy has 225 dioceses and archdioceses, more than any other country in the world with the exception of Brazil. It also has the largest number of parishes (25,694), female (102,089) and male (23,719) religious, and priests (31,000, including secular (i.e. diocesan) and religious (those belonging to a male religious institute)).

In 1986, Pope John Paul II suppressed 101 Italian dioceses. As of 2024, Italy has a total of 41 dioceses united in persona episcopi, or “in the person of the bishop.”

The bishops in Italy make up the Conferenza Episcopale Italiana as a collaborative body to perform certain functions specified by Canon Law. Unlike most episcopal conferences, the president of the Italian conference is appointed by the pope, in his capacity as Primate of Italy. Since May 2022, the president of the episcopal conference has been Cardinal Matteo Maria Zuppi.

=== Organization ===
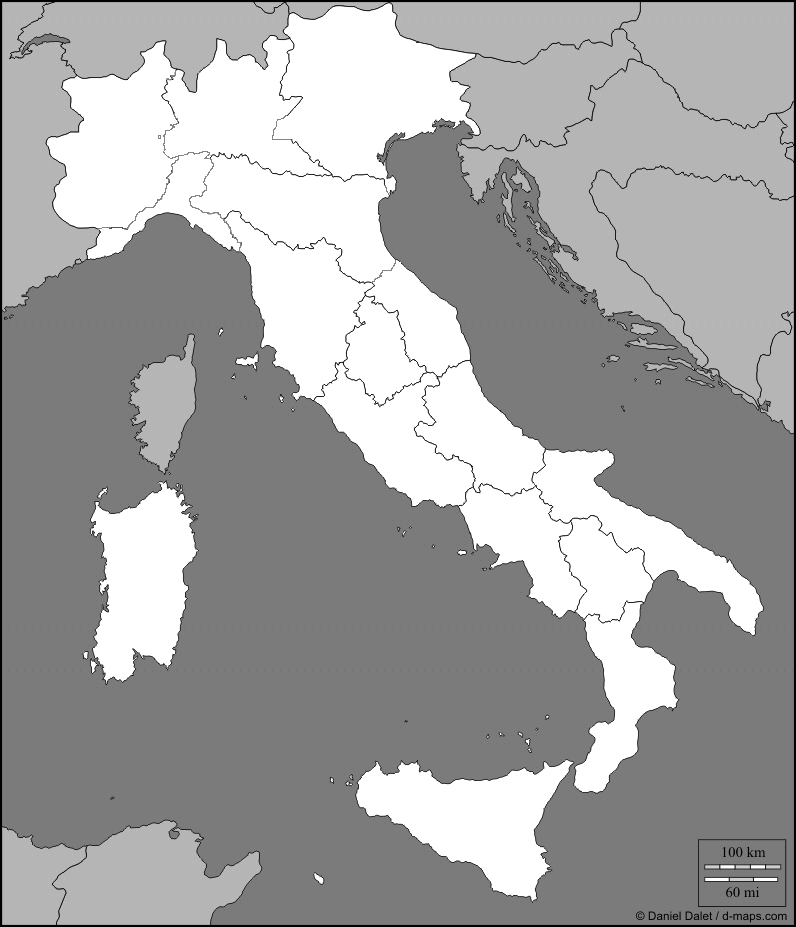
Map of the 16 Italian ecclesiastical regions

The Primate of Italy is the Bishop of Rome, who is also ex officio Pope of the Catholic Church. The Apostolic Nuncio to Italy is also the nuncio to San Marino; the incumbent is Archbishop Petar Rajič, who has held the office since March 2024.

There are two Catholic particular churches in Italy:

- The Latin Church (absolute majority, uses Roman rite except in the Archdiocese of Milan where Ambrosian rite is used).
- The very small Italo-Albanian Catholic Church (one of the Eastern Catholic Churches, uses Byzantine rite) divided into Territorial Abbacy of Saint Mary of Grottaferrata, Eparchy of Lungro and Eparchy of Piana degli Albanesi.

The Latin Church in Italy is organized into:

- 16 ecclesiastical regions (corresponding to the regions of Italy, with some consolidations).
  - 42 ecclesiastical provinces divided into:
    - 1 apostolic see (Diocese of Rome).
    - 1 patriarchal see (Patriarchate of Venice).
    - 40 metropolitan archdioceses.
    - 20 archdioceses.
    - 155 dioceses (see: List of Catholic dioceses in Italy).
    - 2 territorial prelatures: Territorial Prelature of Loreto and Territorial Prelature of Pompei.
    - 6 territorial abbeys: Monte Oliveto Maggiore, Montecassino, Montevergine, Santa Maria di Grottaferrata, La Trinità della Cava and Subiaco.
    - 1 military ordinariate: Military Ordinariate in Italy.

=== Catholic lay organizations ===
- Azione Cattolica (organization of the Catholic Action in Italy)
- Forum Oratori Italiani (umbrella of Catholic youth organizations and youth ministry)

== See also ==
- Religion in Italy
- Christianity in Italy
- Protestantism in Italy
- Public funding of the Catholic Church in Italy
- Eastern Orthodox Church in Italy
- Oriental Orthodox Church in Italy
- List of Catholic dioceses in Italy
- Catholic Church in San Marino
