= Evangelical Lutheran Church in Italy =

Christian denomination founded 1949

The Lutheran Evangelical Church in Italy (Italian: Chiesa Evangelica Luterana in Italia, German: Evangelisch-Lutherische Kirche in Italien, abbreviated CELI or ELKI) is a Protestant denomination in the Lutheran tradition in Italy.

Founded in 1949, the CELI/ELKI, which includes both German- and Italian-speaking communities, is a member of the Federation of Evangelical Churches in Italy (FCEI) and of the Lutheran World Federation (LWF).

The first Lutheran community in Italy was formed in Venice in 1650. Within the Austrian-Hungarian Empire, Lutheran churches were formed in Trieste (1778), Merano (1861) and Bolzano (1889). Under Prussian influence, communities were formed in Rome (1819), Naples (1826) and Florence (1899). Finally, German-speaking citizens established churches in Milan (1850), Sanremo (1870) and Genoa (1896). Lutheranism flourished in Naples and Torre Annunziata thanks to the missionary work of pastor Idelmo Poggioli. All the aforementioned communities were gathered in the CELI/EKLI since 1949. Other churches were formed, notably in Catania (1991), Verona (2008) and Turin (2009), under the supervision of CELI/ELKI, which was a founding member of the FCEI in 1967.

The denomination includes 15 communities, some of which covering entire regions, and about 7,000 baptized members.

The CELI/ELKI allows the ordination of women and the blessing of same-sex unions, in line with other FCEI denominations.

== Gallery of churches ==
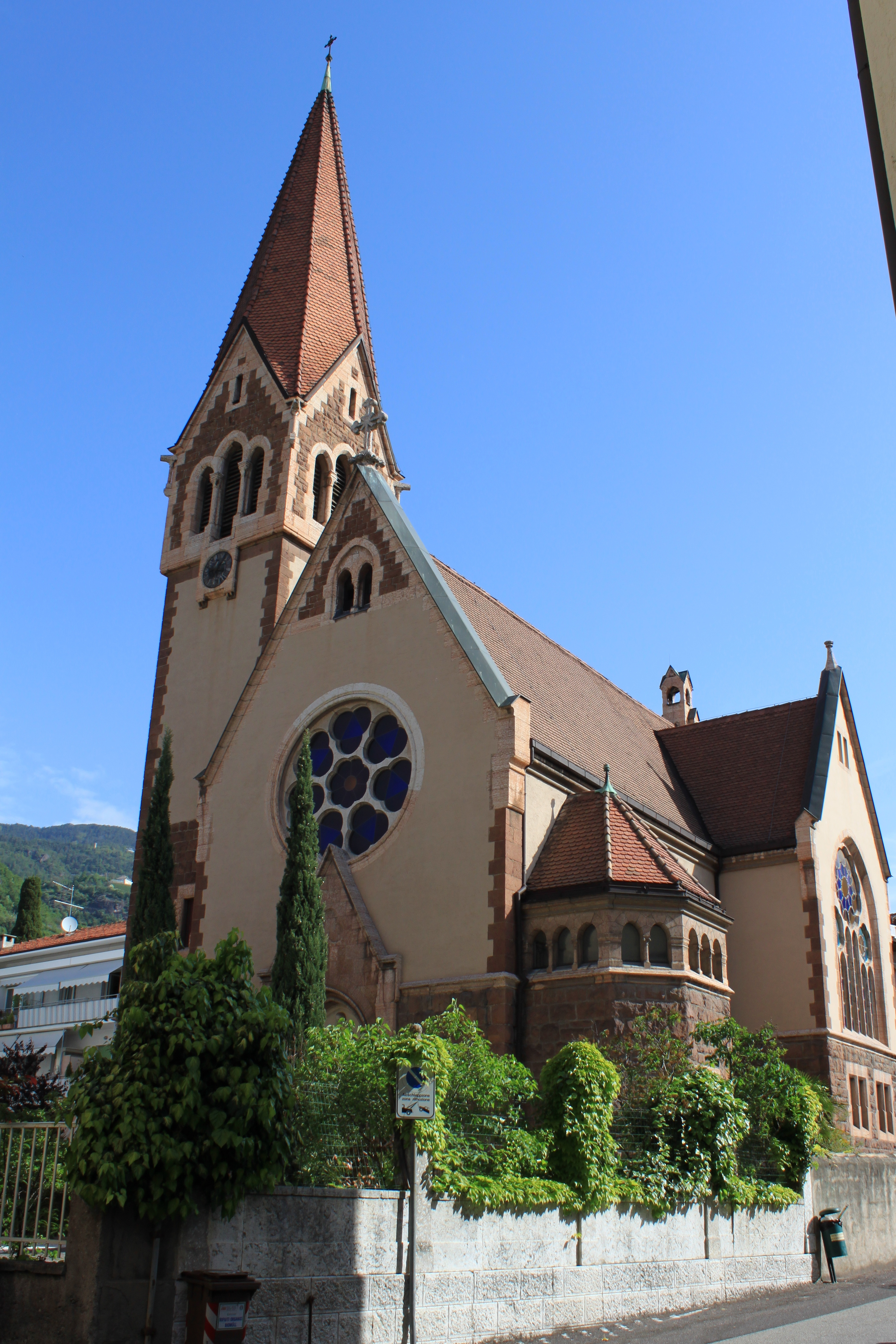
Christ Church, Bolzano

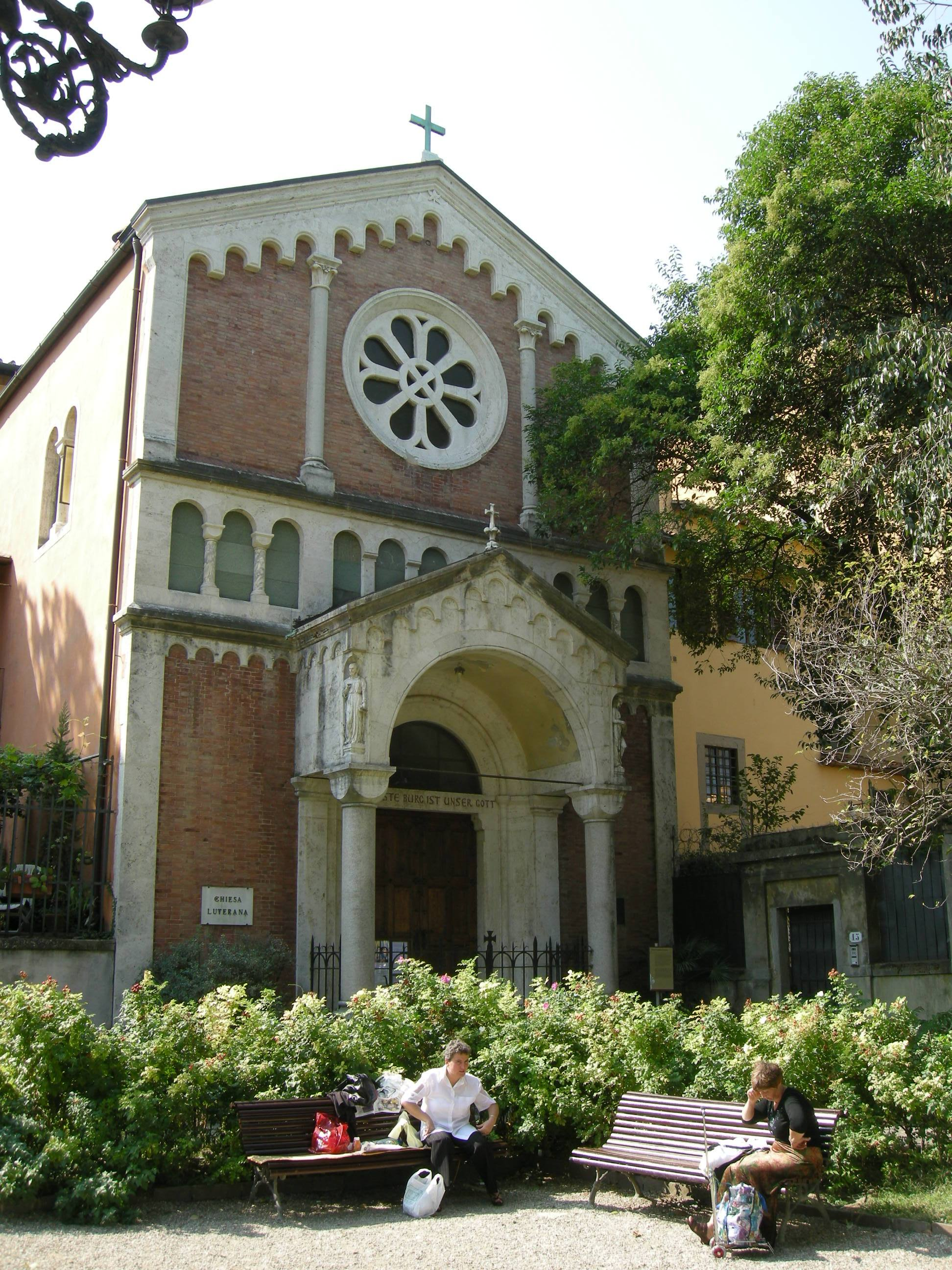
Lutheran Church, Florence

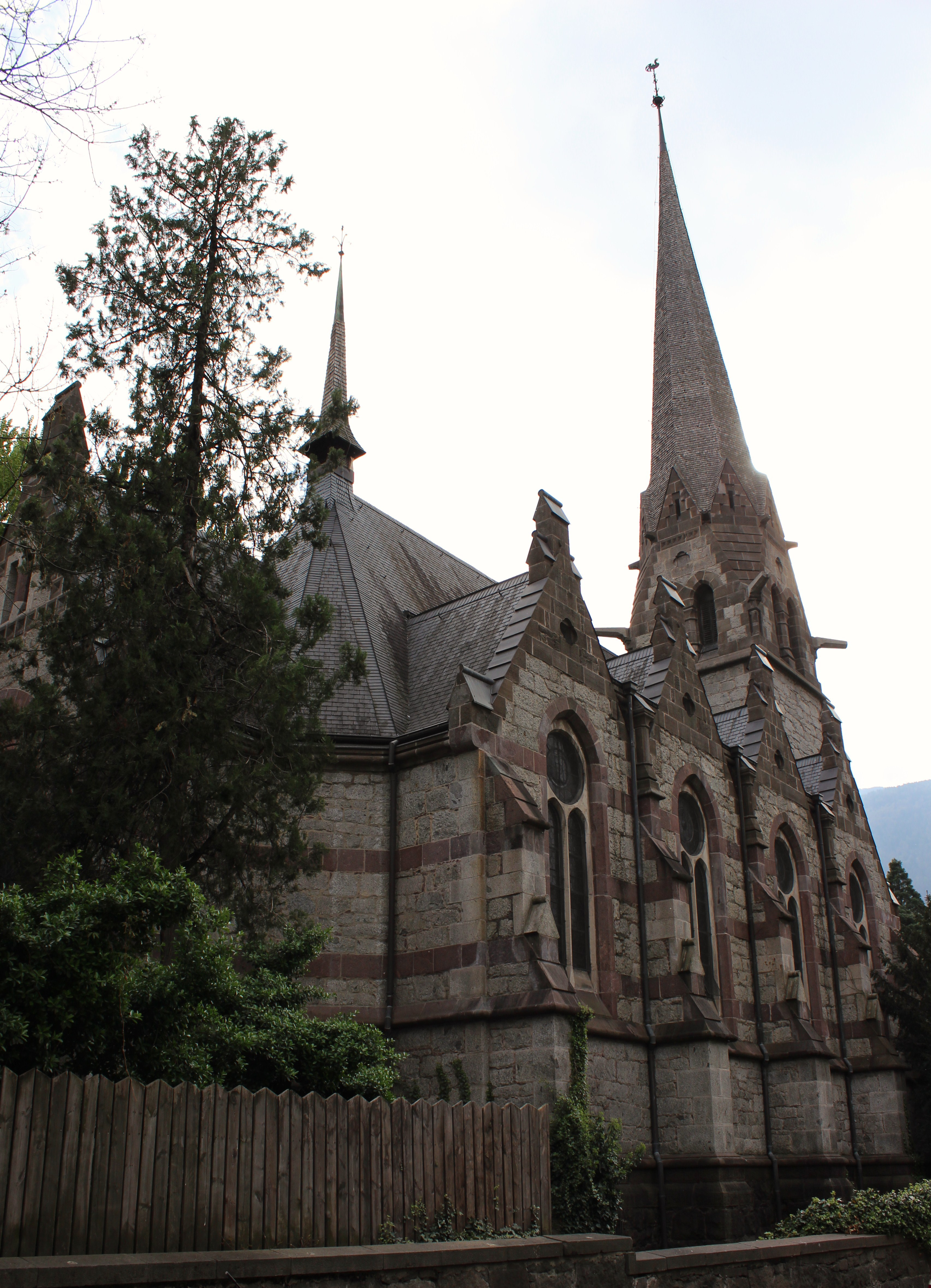
Christ Church, Merano

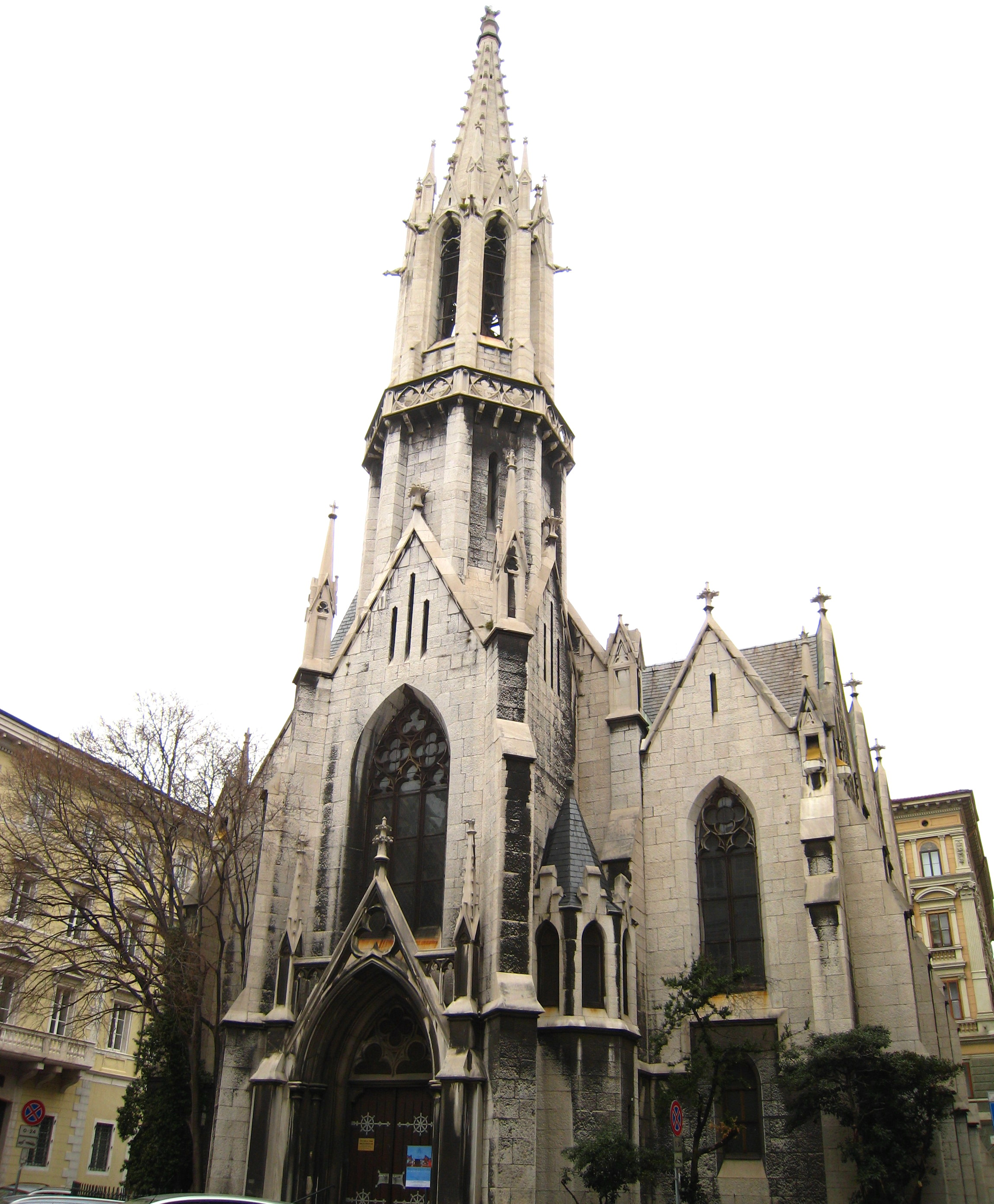
Lutheran Church, Trieste

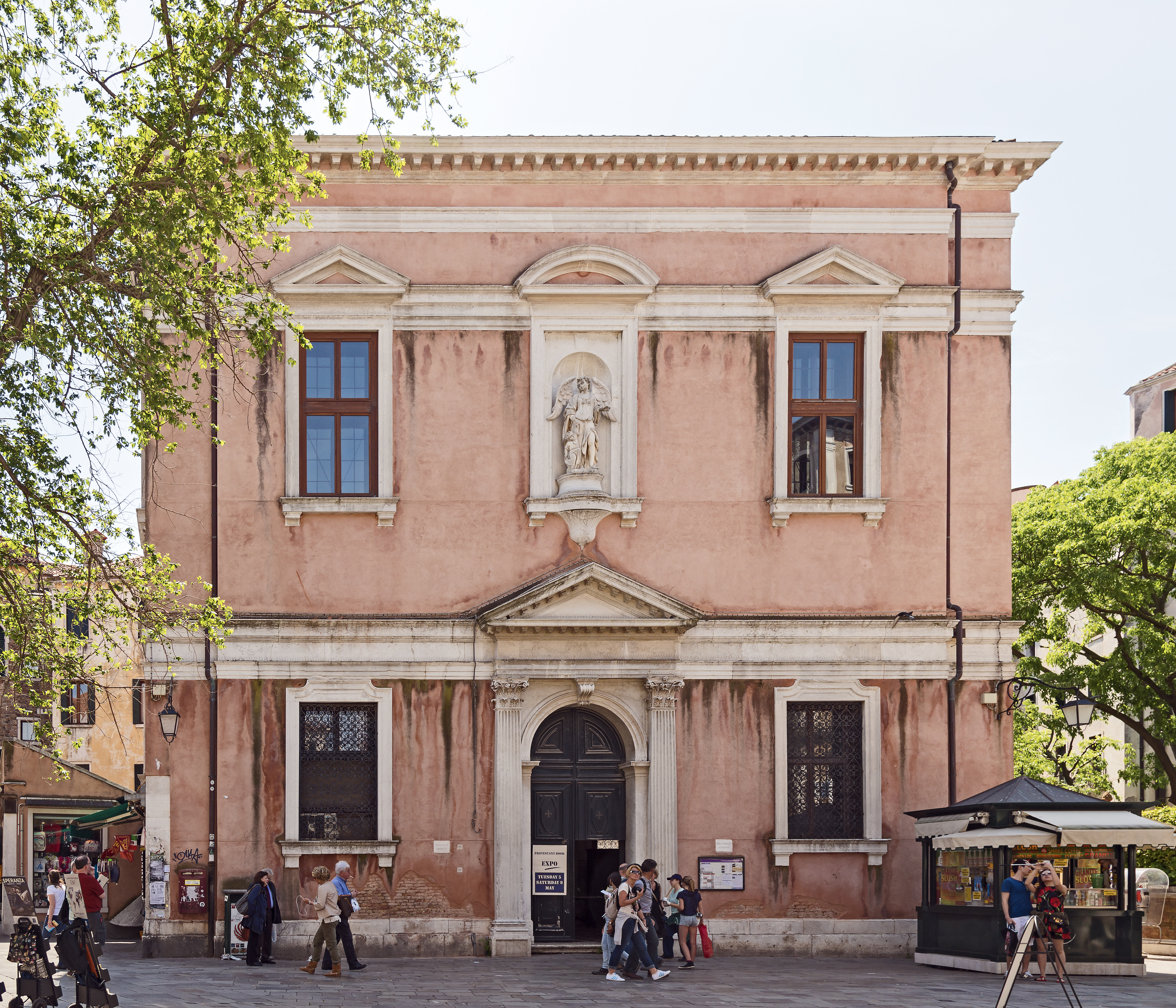
Scola dell'Angelo Custode, Lutheran Church, Venice

== See also ==
- Religion in Italy
- Christianity in Italy
- Protestantism in Italy
- List of Italian religious minority politicians
