= Evangelical Christian Church of the Brethren =

Sect Protestant

The Evangelical Christian Church of the Brethren (Italian: Chiesa Cristiana Evangelica dei Fratelli) is an Italian Protestant denomination.

The church has its own distinct tradition, originated from the missionary work of Piero Guicciardini and Teodorico Pietrocola Rossetti. The movement ascribes a spiritual heritage from the Schwarzenau Brethren. Moreover, the Italian fellowship of Brethren has largely incorporated elements of the Plymouth Brethren tradition, both in the Open Brethren and Exclusive Brethren fashion, and has been influenced also by the work of American Independent Baptist missionaries.

Theologically, the Italian Brethren are Evangelicals. A smaller network of churches espouses a Christian fundamentalist doctrine, with strong influences from John Nelson Darby. Nearly all Italian Brethren are cessationists regarding Pentecostal manifestation, though some members are involved in charismatic, ecumenical groups.

The denomination includes about 300 local churches and 20,000 members throughout Italy.

== See also ==
- Religion in Italy
- Christianity in Italy
- Protestantism in Italy
- List of Italian religious minority politicians
