= Union of Methodist and Waldensian Churches =

Union of Protestant churches in Italy

The Union of Methodist and Waldensian Churches (Italian: Unione delle Chiese Metodiste e Valdesi) is an Italian united Protestant denomination.

It was founded in 1975 upon the union of the Waldensian Evangelical Church (a Calvinist church with pre-Reformation roots) and the Methodist Evangelical Church in Italy.

It has 50,000 members (45,000 Waldensians, of whom 30,000 in Italy and some 15,000 divided between Argentina and Uruguay, and 5,000 Methodists) and it is member of both the World Communion of Reformed Churches (as Waldensian Evangelical Church) and of the World Methodist Council (as Methodist Evangelical Church).

It is a founding member of the Federation of Evangelical Churches in Italy, an ecumenical body representing Italian historical Protestant denominations. The denomination voted, in 2010, to bless same-gender couples.

The organization of the Church is often described as a "hierarchy of assemblies" pursuant to article 7 of the Waldensian Church General Regulation (called in Italian Disciplina Generale), as all decisions must be made by collective organs and no authority can be recognized to a single person.

== See also ==
- Religion in Italy
- Christianity in Italy
- Protestantism in Italy
- List of Italian religious minority politicians
