= Federation of Pentecostal Churches (Italy) =

The Federation of Pentecostal Churches (Federazione delle Chiese Pentecostali, FCP) is a fellowship of Pentecostal churches in Italy.

== History ==
The FCP was officially founded in 2000, but this was just the last step of a long process of federation started in 1983 with the "Rally of Pentecostal Ministers" and continued in 1997 with the foundation of the "Communion of Pentecostal Evangelical Churches". The FCP, which is an observer member of the Federation of Evangelical Churches in Italy (FCEI), is the second-largest Pentecostal body in the country after the Assemblies of God in Italy and has over 50,000 members.

== Members ==
Among FCP member organizations and movements, there are seven main groups:

- the Italian Pentecostal Christian Church
- the Apostolic Church in Italy, Italian branch of the Apostolic Church
- the Elim Churches in Italy, Italian branch of the Elim Pentecostal Church
- the International Evangelical Church and Missionary Association, Italian branch of the International Evangelical Church
- the Italian branch of the Church of God (Cleveland, Tennessee)
- the New Pentecost Movement
- the Word of Grace Church
