= Apostolic Church in Italy =

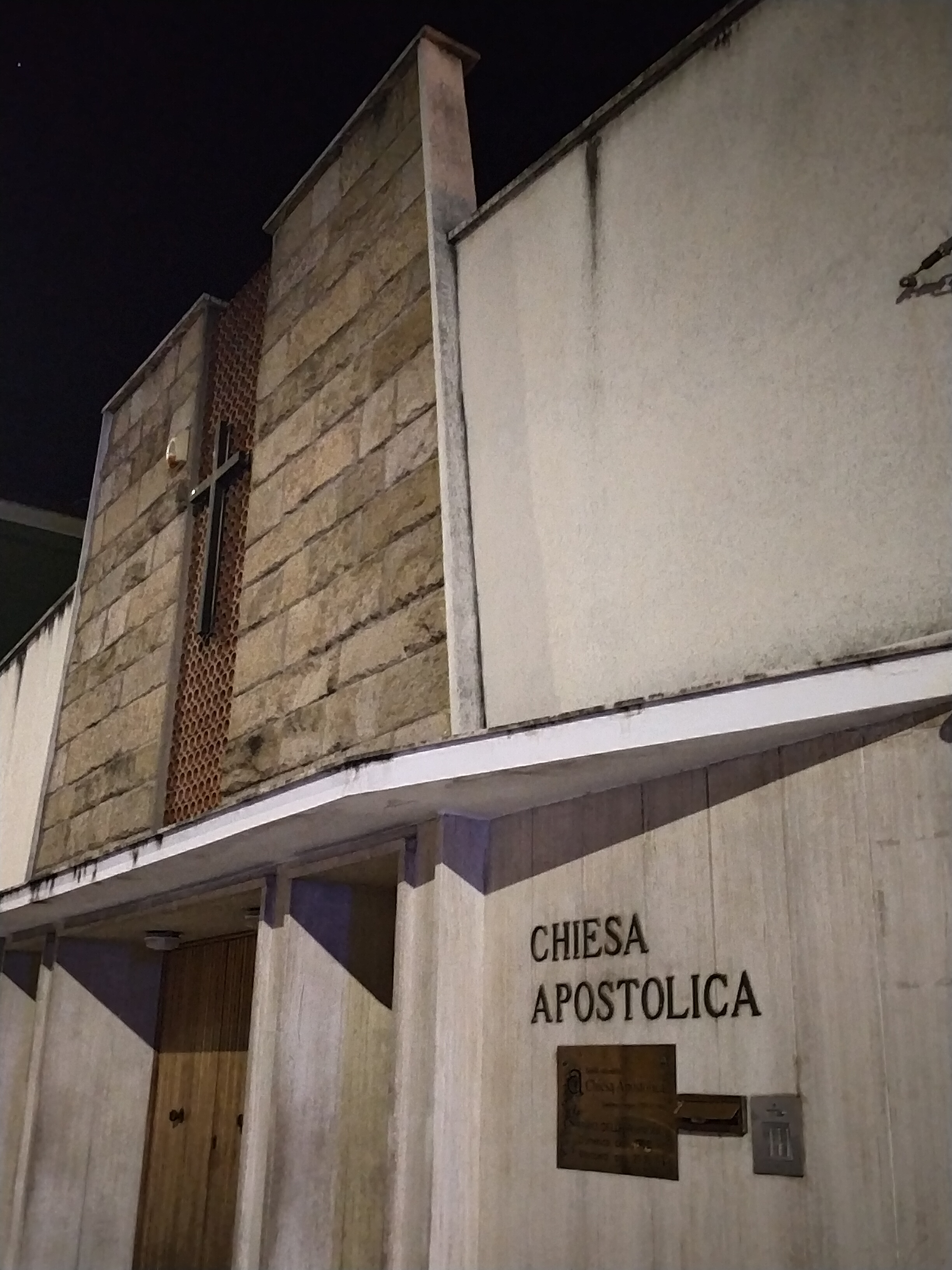
Entrance of the Apostolic Church in Grosseto

The Apostolic Church in Italy (Italian: Chiesa Apostolica in Italia) is an Italian Protestant denomination in the Pentecostal-evangelical tradition founded in 1927, which is part of the Federation of Evangelical Churches in Italy, an ecumenical body representing Italian Protestants. Its headquarter is in Grosseto.

In 2007 the Church and the Italian government signed an agreement, in accordance with article 8 of the Italian Constitution, that became law in 2012.

== See also ==
- Religion in Italy
- Christianity in Italy
- Protestantism in Italy
- List of Italian religious minority politicians
