= Italian Buddhist Union =

Association representing Buddhism in Italy

Italian Buddhist Union Logo

The Italian Buddhist Union (Italian: Unione Buddhista Italiana, UBI) is an association representing Buddhism in Italy.

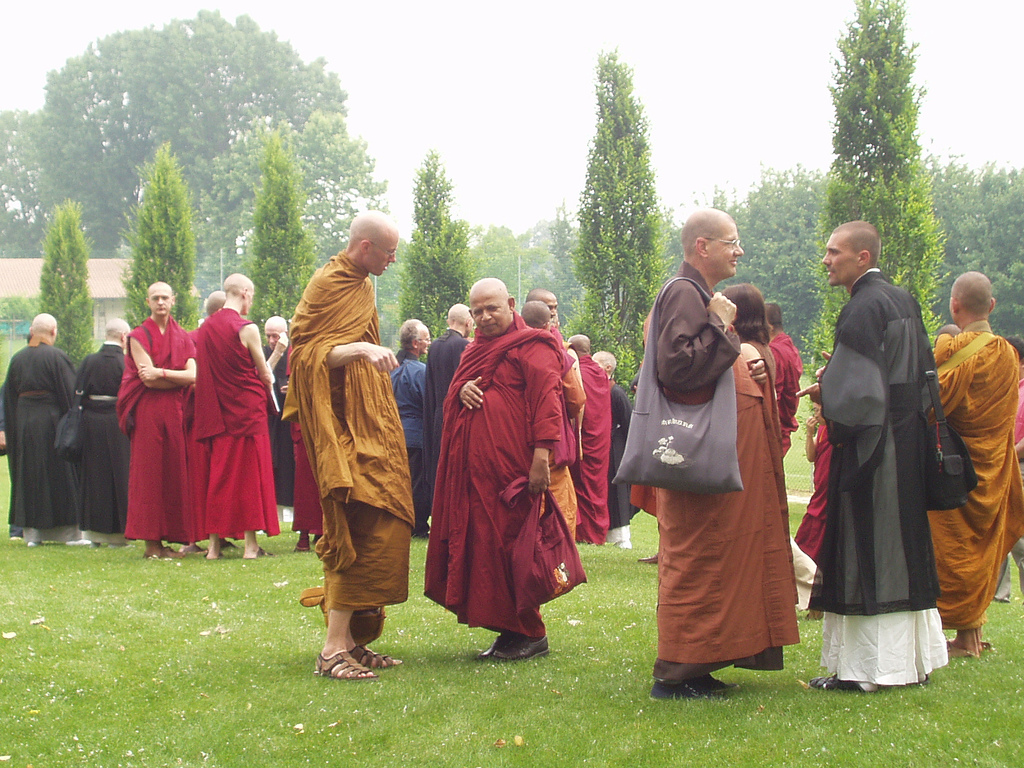
Buddhist sangha observing Vesak in Padua, 2006.

The UBI was founded in 1985 in Milan and functions as the Italian member of the European Buddhist Union.

In 2007 the association, which represents a large chunk of Italy's 160,000 Buddhists, signed an agreement with the Italian government, in accordance with article 8 of the Italian Constitution (which regulates the relations with religious minorities), and the agreement became law in 2012.

== See also ==
- Buddhism in Italy
- Ensoji il Cerchio
- Santacittarama
