= Soka Gakkai Italian Buddhist Institute =

Italian branch of the Soka Gakkai International Nichiren Buddhist organization

The Soka Gakkai Italian Buddhist Institute (Italian: Istituto Buddista Italiano Soka Gakkai) is the Italian branch of the Soka Gakkai International Nichiren Buddhist organisation. The Soka Gakkai Italian Buddhist Institute is popularly known by the acronyms SGI-Italia, SGI-Italy, and SGI-I.

Prior to 1998, the SGI-Italy was known as the Soka Gakkai Italian Association, which had been active in Italy since the late 1970s.

In June 2015, the SGI-Italy was recognized by the Italian government with a special agreement under article 8 of the Italian Constitution, making it eligible to receive direct taxpayer funding for its religious and social activities, making it possible for the denomination to be consulted by the government in certain occasions and allowing to appoint chaplains in the army (an agreement is not needed for appointing chaplains in hospitals and jails). Twelve other religious denominations share this status, with different agreements.

In August 2015, Italian newspaper la Repubblica reported that 75,000 Italian citizens are SGI-Italia members, which accounts for half of the Buddhist population of Italy.

== See also ==
- Buddhism in Italy
