= Italian Union of Seventh-day Adventist Christian Churches =

Protestant religious organization

The Italian Union of Seventh-Day Adventist Christian Churches (Italian: Unione Italiana delle Chiese Cristiane Avventiste del Settimo Giorno, UICCA), part of the worldwide fellowship of the Seventh-day Adventist Church, is a Protestant denomination in Italy.

The Union's full members, as of 30 June 2020, are 9,359, worshiping in 107 local churches. In 1986 Italian Seventh-day Adventists first signed an agreement with the Italian government, in accordance with article 8 of the Italian Constitution, which regulates the relations between the Republic and religious minorities. Three successive agreements were later signed. The latter of these agreements was approved by Parliament and made law in 2009.

Through the Voce della Speranza (VDS) organization, the UICCA has created the "Hope Media Italia" Adventist media center, which has both radio (RVS) and TV (HCI) branches.

== See also ==
- Protestantism in Italy
- General Conference of Seventh-day Adventists
- Inter-European Division of Seventh-day Adventists
