= Ombúes de Lavalle =

- City
- Location within Uruguay
- Coordinates: 33°56′15″S 57°48′45″W
- Country: Uruguay
- Department: Colonia
- Elevation: 119 m (390 ft)

Population (2011 Census)
  - Total: 3,390
- Time zone: UTC -3
- Postal code: 70003
- Dial plan: +598 4576 (+4 digits)

Ombúes de Lavalle is a small city located in the north of Colonia Department in southwestern Uruguay. It is named after the Argentine General Juan Lavalle. The term «Ombúes» is the Spanish plural for «Ombú», a tree originary of the Pampas region, in southern South America, and a national symbol of both Argentina and Uruguay.

== Geography ==
It is located near the border with the Soriano Department on Route 55, 3 kilometres (1.9 mi) south of its intersection with Route 12, 44 kilometres (27 mi) west-southwest of Cardona and 69 kilometres (43 mi) east of Nueva Palmira.

The town is located 119 meters above the sea level. The stream Miguelete, a main tributary of San Juan River, starts at the basin that lies directly southeast of the village.

== History ==
In August 1890, a populated centre was founded here. It was declared as "Pueblo" (village) on 14 December 1932, by the Act of Ley Nº 8.922. On 17 November 1964, its status was elevated to "Villa" (town) by the Act of Ley Nº 13.299, and finally on 17 May 1984, it was further elevated to "Ciudad" (city) by the Act of Ley Nº 15.549.

== Population ==
In 2011 Ombúes de Lavalle had a population of 3,390.

Year	Population
1908	1,775
1963	2,171
1975	2,787
1985	3,024
1996	3,189
2004	3,451
2011	3,390

Source: Instituto Nacional de Estadística de Uruguay

== Main features ==
The main street of the town, running SW to NE, is Juan Zorrilla de San Martín. It joins Ruta 55 to Conchillas at its southwest end and, at its northeast end, Ruta 55 to José Enrique Rodó of the Soriano Department.

In the east part of the town is a square, Plaza 1 de Agosto, which is also a small park, and next to it is the administrative centre of the town, the Junta Local, and a public library. In the north part of the town is a big open area called Los Ombúes featuring the trees that gave their name to the town. In the same area are an open doors sports square, a small polyclinic, an old mill, a Catholic church and the cultural centre of the town.

== Places of worship ==
- St. Joseph and St. Michael Parish Church (Roman Catholic)
