= Egaña =

- Village
- Location in Uruguay
- Coordinates: 33°36′0″S 57°38′0″W
- Country: Uruguay
- Department: Soriano

Population (2011)
  - Total: 783
- Time zone: UTC -3
- Postal code: 75002
- Dial plan: +598 4538 (+4 digits)

Egaña is a village in the Soriano Department of western Uruguay.

== Geography ==
The village is located 3 kilometres (1.9 mi) off Route 3, at about 15 kilometres (9.3 mi) northwest of José Enrique Rodó and 20 kilometres (12 mi) southeast of Palmitas. The railroad track from Montevideo to Mercedes and further north passes through the village.

== History ==
On 13 May 1971, the status of the populated centre here was elevated to "Pueblo" (village) by the Act of Ley Nº 13.959.

== Population ==
In 2011 Egaña had a population of 783.

Year	Population
1963	675
1975	673
1985	690
1996	709
2004	852
2011	783

Source: Instituto Nacional de Estadística de Uruguay
