= Florencio Sánchez, Uruguay =

Florencio Sánchez
- City
- Location within Uruguay
- Coordinates: 33°53′0″S 57°23′0″W
- Country: Uruguay
- Department: Colonia
- Elevation: 156 m (512 ft)

Population (2011 Census)
  - Total: 3,716
- Time zone: UTC -3
- Postal code: 75204
- Dial plan: +598 4536 (+4 digits)

Florencio Sánchez is a small city of the Colonia Department of southwestern Uruguay, on the border with Soriano Department, and is a southern extension of the city Cardona of that department. It is named after the Uruguayan writer and politician Florencio Sánchez and is home to more than 3,700 people.

== Geography ==
The city is located on the junction of Route 2 with Route 12. Route 102 connects it with the city of Rosario, in the south, while the Route 2 leads to Mercedes and Fray Bentos, the capital cities of Soriano and Río Negro, respectively.

== History ==
On 2 October 1929, this populated centre was given the status of "Pueblo" by the Act of Ley Nº 8.482. Until then it had been the head of the judicial section "Puntas de San Juan". Its status was elevated to "Villa" (town) by the Act of Ley Nº 15.540 on 3 May 1984, and finally to "Ciudad" (city) by the Act of Ley Nº 16.725 on 24 November 1995.

== Population ==
In 2011 Florencio Sánchez had a population of 3,716.

Year	Population
1908	2,607
1963	1,573
1975	1,887
1985	2,562
1996	3,038
2004	3,526
2011	3,716

Source: Instituto Nacional de Estadística de Uruguay
