= Waldensian Evangelical Church of the River Plate =

Waldensian Evangelical Church of Rio de la Plata
- Classification: Protestant
- Orientation: Reformed
- Theology: Waldensian
- Polity: Presbyterian
- Associations: World Communion of Reformed Churches
- Region: Argentina and Uruguay
- Origin: 1858
- Branched from: Waldensian Evangelical Church
- Congregations: 24
- Official website: iglesia-valdense.org

The Waldensian Evangelical Church of Rio de la Plata (in Spanish: Iglesia evangélica valdense del Río de la Plata or IEVRP) is a Waldensian denomination present in Uruguay and Argentina, founded in 1858, by Italian immigrants, previously linked to Waldensian Evangelical Church.

== History ==
In 1852, Juan Pedro Planchón was the first Waldensian present in the Rio de la Plata Basin. He was sent to South America with the task of verifying the possibility of promoting the settlement of Waldensian families from the Vales Waldensians in Uruguay or Argentina. After his favorable report, in January 1857 he arrived in Montevideo the first contingent of Waldensian families, who were immediately transferred to Florida in Uruguay. A few months later, in September of the same year, the second contingent arrived; the third contingent would arrive in January of the following year.

The immigrants quickly realized that the conditions for their peaceful integration were not given in Florida and, in July 1858, they signed the contract to colonize what is now La Paz and Colonia Valdense, in the Colonia Department.

A few years later, in 1860, part of the immigrants moved to Argentina, to the city of San Carlos Centro, in the province of Santa Fe Province, city founded a few years earlier by Swiss immigrants. Ten years later they arrived in El Sombrerito, province of Santa Fe and Rosario del Tala, in the province of Entre Ríos Province. Some of the communities formed by Waldensian immigrants in Argentina will be served, from a spiritual point of view, by the Methodist Church.

In Uruguay, from the initial settlement in La Paz and Colônia Valdense, organized groups were progressively created in the departments of Soriano, Río Negro and Paysandú, in the western region of the country, and in the Rocha Department, in the east.

The flow of Waldensian immigrants has continued over time, with peaks in the flow of immigrants being observed in the years following the two World Wars.

== Inter-ecclesiastical relations ==
The church is a member of the World Communion of Reformed Churches. Furthermore, the denomination is closely related to the Waldensian Evangelical Church, with which it holds meetings on theological matters.

== Beliefs ==
The Church subscribes to the Apostles' Creed and the Nicene Creed. In addition, the denomination subscribes to the Waldensian Confession of Faith, drawn up in 1655.

The Church supports the ordination of women.

=== Marriage ===
A 2010 resolution allows local churches to decide about blessings of same-sex marriage.
