= Santa Catalina, Uruguay =

Santa Catalina
- Village
- Location in Uruguay
- Coordinates: 33°47′0″S 57°29′0″W
- Country: Uruguay
- Department: Soriano Department

Population (2011)
  - Total: 998
- Time zone: UTC -3
- Postal code: 75201
- Dial plan: +598 4538 (+4 digits)

Santa Catalina is a village in the Soriano Department of western Uruguay.

== Geography ==
The village is located on Route 2, about 15 kilometres (9.3 mi) northwest of Cardona and 12 kilometres (7.5 mi) southeast of José Enrique Rodó. The railroad track Montevideo - Mercedes passes through the town.

== History ==
On 19 December 1940, the status of the populated nucleus here was elevated to "Pueblo" (village) by the Act of Ley Nº 9.985. Previously, it had been the head of the judicial section "Arroyo el Medio".

== Population ==
In 2011 Santa Catalina had a population of 998.

Year	Population
1908	1,894
1963	824
1975	884
1985	882
1996	929
2004	1,053
2011	998

Source: Instituto Nacional de Estadística de Uruguay
