= Zagarzazú International Airport =

Airport in Carmelo, Uruguay

Zagarzazú International Airport Carmelo Airport
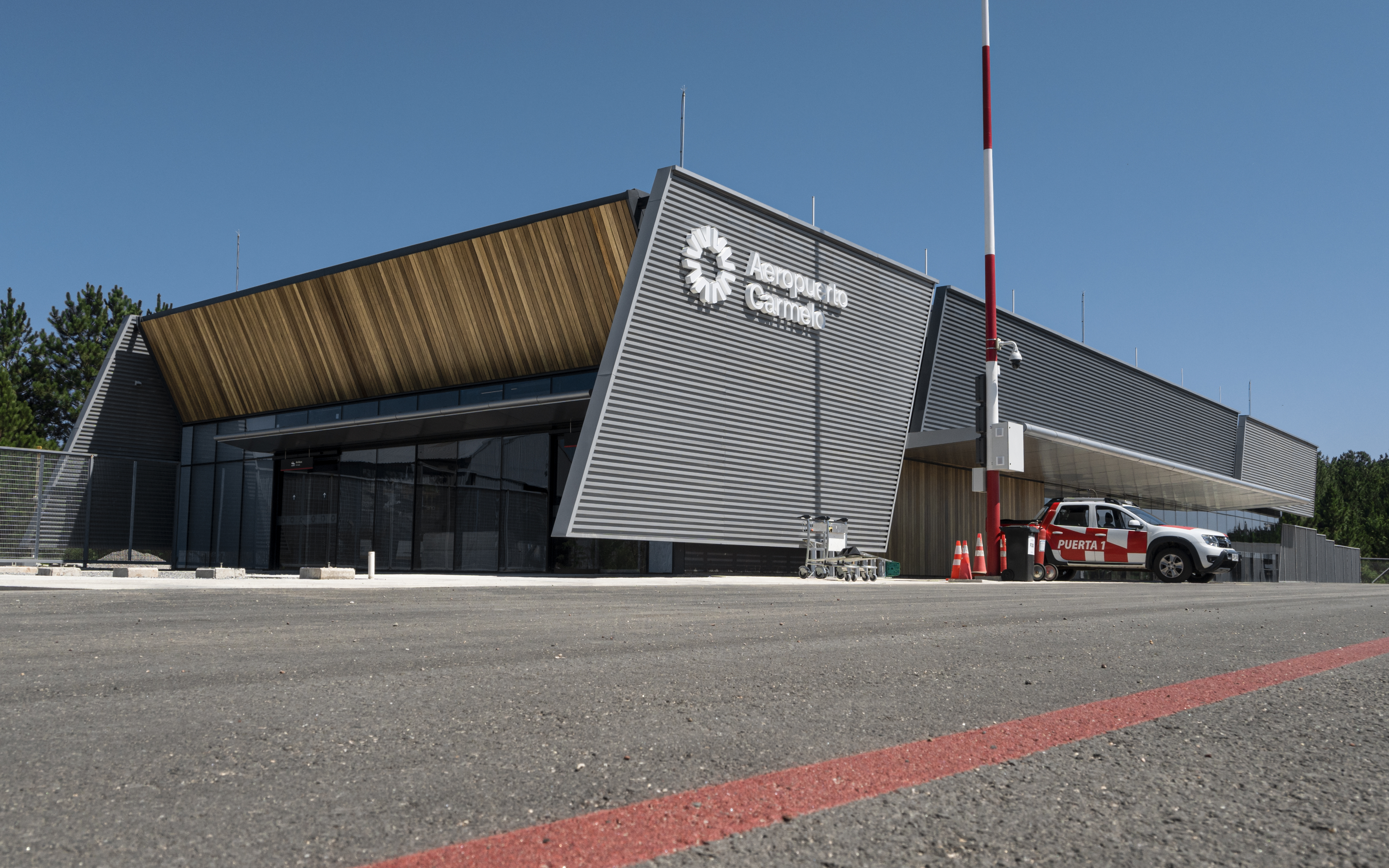
- IATA: none; ICAO: SUCM

Summary
- Airport type: Public
- Operator: Aeropuertos Uruguay
- Serves: Carmelo, Uruguay
- Location: Zagarzazú
- Elevation AMSL: 36 ft (11 m)
- Coordinates: 33°57′55″S 58°19′35″W

Map
- Location of the airport in Uruguay

Runways
Direction	Length		Surface
Direction	m	ft	Surface
17/35	1,060	3,478	Gravel
- Sources: SkyVector, GCM

Zagarzazú International Airport (ICAO: SUCM) is an airport serving the city of Carmelo in Colonia Department, Uruguay. The airport was redeveloped in the early 2020s, and was opened after renovation in December 2022. It is named after the nearby resort village of Zagarzazu.

== Location ==
The airport serves the city of Carmelo in the Colonia Department in Uruguay. The airport is located approximately 3 mi (4.8 km) from Carmelo. The airport is named after the nearby resort village of Zagarzazu.

== History ==
The airport was renovated in early 2022, and the renovation works, carried out by Aeropuertos Uruguay at an estimated cost of US$ nine million. The works included the paving and extension of the main runway, the construction of new taxiways, flight apron, and passenger terminal, addition of new runway lighting, meteorological station, and dedicated facilities for fire and police services. It was the first airport to be renovated by Corporación América as a part of a national programme to renovate six airports in the country. The renovated airport was opened on 19 December 2022 by Uruguayan president Luis Lacalle Pou. The second phase of expansion had been planned for later, which includes the construction of a car park, an access road to the terminal, and hangar infrastructure for general aviation.

== Infrastructure ==
The airport has a single asphalt runway designated 17/35, measuring 1,190 m (3,900 ft) long and 28 m (92 ft) wide. The runway was paved and extended as a part of the renovation in 2022. The San Fernando VOR-DME (Ident: FDO) is located 31.8 nautical miles (59 km) south-southwest of the airport. There is a 6,000 m^{2} (65,000 sq ft) flight apron, that was added in 2022.

The passenger terminal is spread over an area of 770 m^{2} (8,300 sq ft), and was constructed as a part of the renovation plan in 2024. It is designed by Estudio Gómez Platero, and is equipped with a duty free shop and food and beverage spaces.

== Airlines and destinations ==
As of early 2026, there are no scheduled passenger airline services to or from Zagarzazú International Airport.

== See also ==
- Transport in Uruguay
- List of airports in Uruguay
