= Iribarren (surname) =

Iribarren is a Basque surname, and may refer to:

- Gabriel Iribarren (born 1981), Argentine football player
- Gonzalo Pérez Iribarren (1936–1998), Uruguayan mathematician and statistical expert
- Hernán Iribarren (born 1984), baseball player
- Jean-Michel Iribarren (born 1958), French author
- José María Iribarren (1906–1971), Spanish lawyer and writer
- Juan Antonio Iribarren (1885–1977), Chilean politician
- Juan Carlos Iribarren (1901–1969), Argentine football player
- Juan Francés de Iribarren (1699–1767), Spanish composer
- Ramón Iribarren Cavanilles (1900–1967), Spanish civil engineer
- Ricardo Iribarren (born 1967), Argentine soccer player
