= Cañada Nieto =

- pueblo
- Location within Uruguay
- Coordinates: 33°41′57″S 58°6′30″W
- Country: Uruguay
- Department: Soriano Department & Colonia Department

Population (2011)
  - Total: 430
- Time zone: UTC -3
- Postal code: 75101
- Dial plan: +598 45 (+6 digits)

Cañada Nieto is a village in the Soriano Department of southwestern Uruguay.

== Geography ==
The village is located on Route 96, 21 kilometres (13 mi) southeast from Dolores and 19 kilometres (12 mi) northwest of its intersection with Route 19.

== History ==
On 22 September 1954 its status was elevated to "Pueblo" (village) by the Act of Ley Nº 12.137.

== Population ==
In 2011 Cañada Nieto had a population of 430.

Year	Population
1963	407
1975	503
1985	479
1996	470
2004	454
2011	430

Source: Instituto Nacional de Estadística de Uruguay
