= Villa Darwin =

Villa Darwin Sacachispas
- Village
- Location in Uruguay
- Coordinates: 33°7′0″S 57°38′0″W
- Country: Uruguay
- Department: Soriano Department

Population (2011)
  - Total: 456
- Time zone: UTC -3
- Postal code: 75000
- Dial plan: +598 453 (+5 digits)

Villa Darwin is a village or populated centre in the Soriano Department of western Uruguay.

== Geography ==
The village is located 14 kilometres (8.7 mi) into a road that splits off Route 14 in a northward direction 35 kilometres (22 mi) east of Mercedes. The rural area it is in, is known as Sacachispas. Its nearest populated place is the village of Palmar in an east-northeast direction. The stream Arroyo Perico Flaco flows along the east limits of the village, 4 kilometres (2.5 mi) south of the point where it discharges into the Río Negro.

== Population ==
In 2011 Villa Darwin had a population of 456.

Year	Population
1963	445
1975	502
1985	513
1996	491
2004	582
2011	456

Source: Instituto Nacional de Estadística de Uruguay
