= Risso, Uruguay =

Risso
- Village
- Location in Uruguay
- Coordinates: 33°37′0″S 57°34′0″W
- Country: Uruguay
- Department: Soriano Department

Population (2011)
  - Total: 557
- Time zone: UTC -3
- Postal code: 75003
- Dial plan: +598 4538 (+4 digits)

Risso is a village or populated centre in the Soriano Department of western Uruguay.

== Geography ==
The village is located 4.3 kilometres (2.7 mi) off Route 3, at about 9 kilometres (5.6 mi) northwest of José Enrique Rodó and 29 kilometres (18 mi) southeast of Palmitas.

== History ==
On 13 May 1971, the status of the populated centre here was elevated to "Pueblo" (village) by the Act of Ley Nº 13.959.

== Population ==
In 2011 Risso had a population of 557.

Year	Population
1963	429
1975	515
1985	431
1996	509
2004	666
2011	557

Source: Instituto Nacional de Estadística de Uruguay
