= Nueva Palmira =

- City
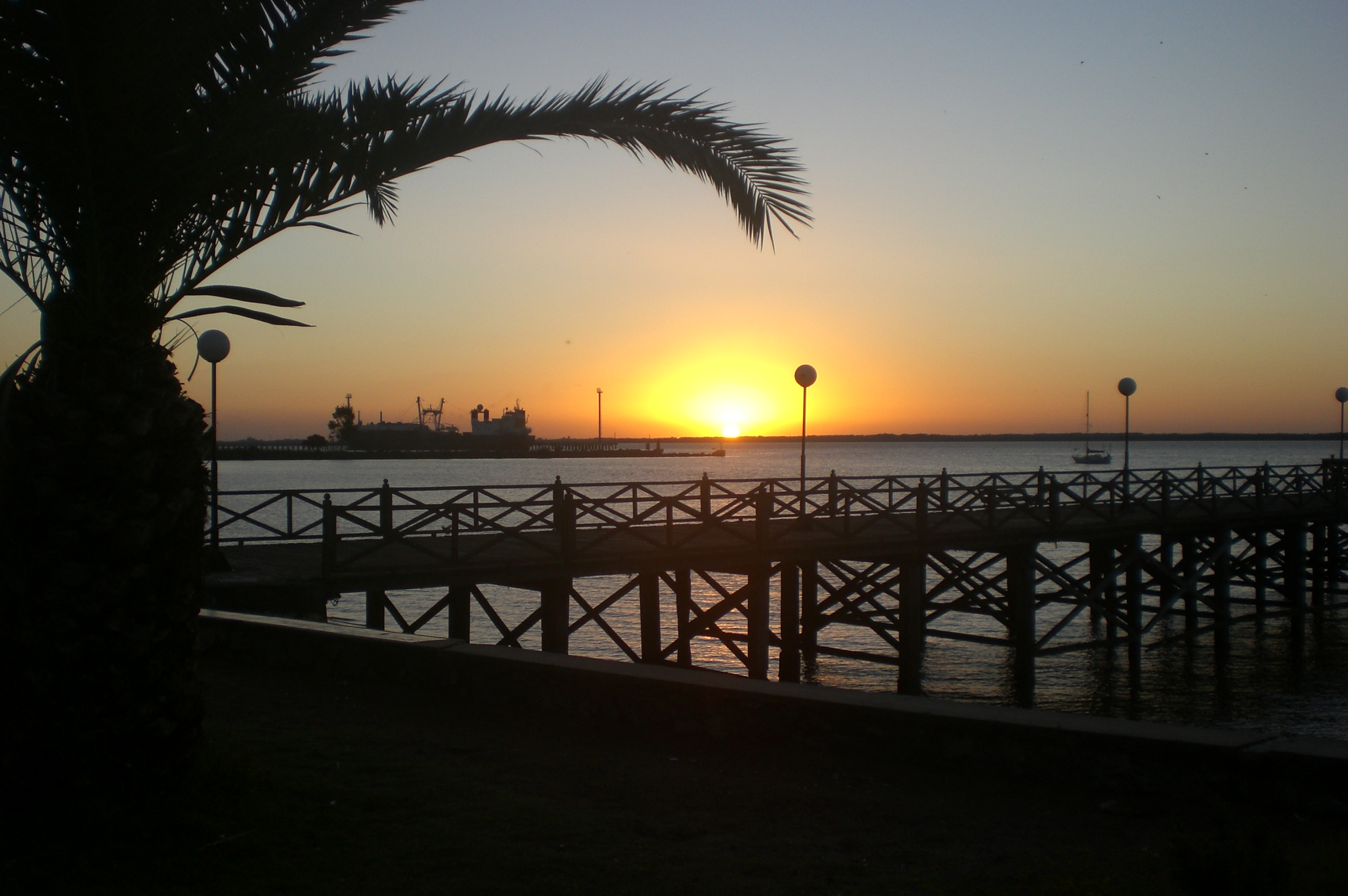

- Location within Uruguay
- Coordinates: 33°53′0″S 58°25′0″W
- Country: Uruguay
- Department: Colonia
- Founded: 1831
- Founder: Felipe Santiago Torres Leiva

Population (2011 Census)
  - Total: 9,857
- Time zone: UTC -3
- Postal code: 70101
- Dial plan: +598 4544 (+4 digits)

Nueva Palmira is a city in Colonia Department in south-western Uruguay.

== Geography ==
It is located on the east bank of Uruguay River, about 86 kilometres (53 mi) northwest of the departmental capital Colonia del Sacramento.

== History ==
A "Pueblo" (village) named "Higueritas" was founded here on 26 October 1831 by Felipe Santiago Torres Leiva. Its status was elevated to "Villa" (town) by the Act of Ley Nº 7.257 on 17 August 1920 and then to "Ciudad" (city) by the Act of Ley Nº 11961 on 1 July 1953. The city got its name from the ancient city of Palmyra in Syria (Aramaic for City of Date Trees).

== Population ==
In 2011 Nueva Palmira had a population of 9,857.

Year	Population
1908	4,191
1963	6,307
1975	7,146
1985	7,151
1996	8,339
2004	9,230
2011	9,857

Source: Instituto Nacional de Estadística de Uruguay

== Features ==
Nueva Palmira is considered the second most important commercial port in Uruguay after the Port of Montevideo and offers docking facility for yachts. There are several beaches along its shore, like Playa Higuerita, Playa Eolo, Playa Corbacho and Playa Los Vascos, while the northern end of the city, along the shore, is a resort called Balneario Brisas del Uruguay.

== Main streets and squares ==
The main streets are General J.G. Artigas and fellipe Fontana, both running SE to NW, converge at the southeastern end of town and join with Ruta 21 towards Carmelo. The other main street, Chile, runs SW to NE and extends to Ruta 21 towards Dolores and Mercedes of Soriano Department.

The main squares of the city are Plaza de los 33 Patriotas, which takes up two blocks and extends to the Muelle Viejo (Old Dock) at the waterfront, and Plaza Artigas, featuring a monument to José Gervasio Artigas and the main church of the city. There is also Plaza de Deportes which offers open doors sports facilities. The city has also a zoological garden in its northern part.

== Places of worship ==
- Our Lady of Remedies Parish Church (Roman Catholic)

== Government ==
The city mayor as of July 2010 is Andrés Passarino.

== Notable people ==
- Wilson Graniolatti, football player.
- Gianni Guigou, football player.
- Sergio Rochet, football player.
- Francisco Lucas Roselli, palaontologist, spent most of his life in Nueva Palmira.

== See also ==
- Geography of Uruguay#The Littoral
