= Zagarzazú =

Zagarzazú Balneario Zagarzazú
- Village, resort
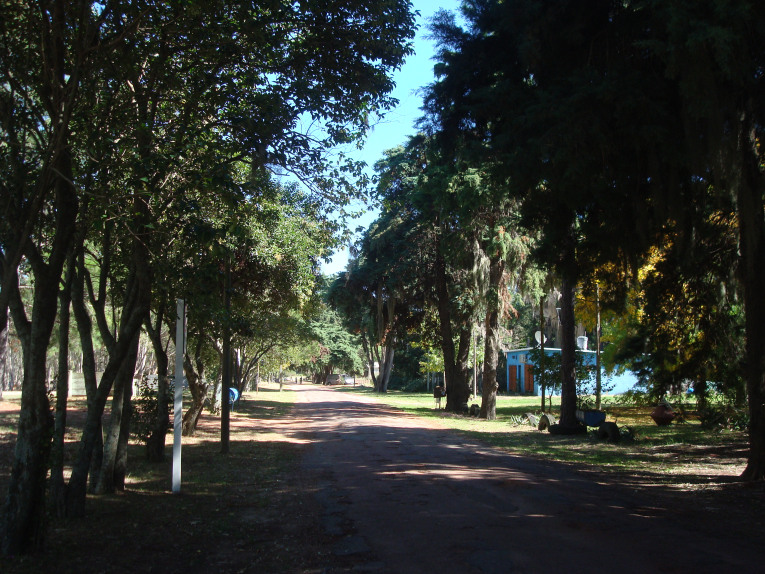

- Location in Uruguay
- Coordinates: 33°58′0″S 58°20′0″W
- Country: Uruguay
- Department: Colonia Department

Population (2011)
  - Total: 96
- Time zone: UTC -3
- Postal code: 70100
- Dial plan: +598 4542 (+4 digits)

Zagarzazú or Balneario Zagarzazú is a resort village in the Colonia Department of southwestern Uruguay.

== Geography ==
Zagarzazú is located on the coast of Río Uruguay, north of the city of Carmelo and just south of Route 21. To the west of the resort is the Four Seasons Resort of Carmelo. To the north of the hotel and the resort is situated a golf course.

== Population ==
In 2011 Zagarzazú had a population of 96 permanent inhabitants and 165 dwellings. According to El Pais, the majority of the dwellings are rented by people from Carmelo either for summer vacation or as residence during the whole year, as many of them are employees of the Four Seasons Hotel.

Year	Population	Dwellings
1975	18	41
1985	20	37
1996	41	65
2004	66	
2011	96	165

Source: Instituto Nacional de Estadística de Uruguay

== History ==
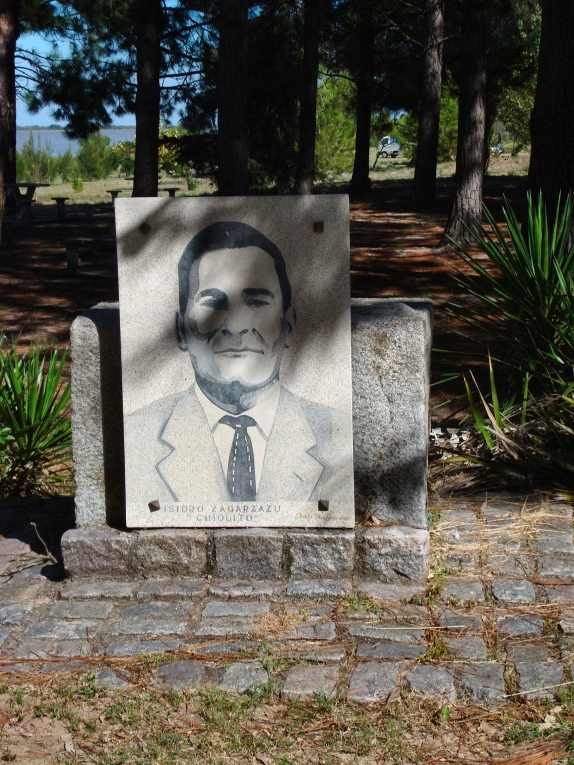
Monument to Isidro Zagarzazú

A statue of the founder of the resort, Isidro "Chiquito" Zagarzazú, can be found at the end of the entrance road near the beach.

Just east of the Zagarzazú resort is the Zagarzazú International Airport. This airport was built along with the resort by Isidro Zagarzazú. The airport was later donated to the City of Carmelo to make it an international airport. Since its donation, there has been political pressure to make it a domestic airport again in order to increase traffic to the neighbouring Colonia Airport. According to Mr. Parodi, subdirector of tourism in 2009, a movement of 20 privately chartered flights per day was recorded in this airport, transporting people who came to play golf or to stay in the Four Seasons Hotel.

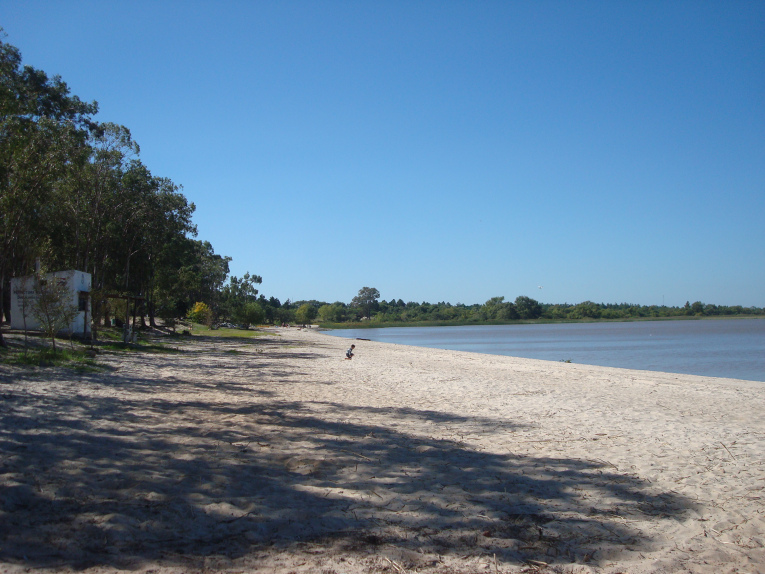
The beach of Zagarzazú

== Beach ==
The beach of Zagarzazú is reminiscent of the resorts of the Costa de Oro of the Canelones Department, though the number of visitors is much smaller.
