= Las Víboras =

Coordinates: 34°00′S 58°17′W

Las Víboras is a Uruguayan town in the Colonia Department which was one of the first towns in the Uruguayan countryside. A substantial portion of its population later became the base of the city of Carmelo.

== History ==
In February 1527 under the command of the Spanish, the Venetian Sebastian Cabot founded the fort of San Lázaro in the area, but the population quickly succumbed to attacks by the Timbú people, so it was abandoned for two years until September of 1530.

In 1745 Ambrosio Sosa owned 650 cattle out of a total of 2,650 in the region. In 1758 the census of Fray Domingo Monzón was carried out, where it was revealed that 194 people lived in the Víboras district. Juan Francisco Palacios erected the chapel of the town of Las Víboras, in which Fray Fernando Oviedo was the first parish priest.

In 1760 the Town of Las Víboras was officially founded, thanks to the initiative of Don Gerónimo Monzón. In 1783 Don Antonio Mariano Alonso arrived, who was the new parish priest, and in 1798 the priest Casimiro José de la Fuente arrived. In 1800 José Artigas came to Las Víboras to banish bandits and smugglers. In 1806 Las Víboras became a refuge for Buenos Aires residents who escaped from the first English invasion. In 1809 the priest Felipe Santiago Torres Leiva arrived at Las Víboras.

Years later, in 1815, Father Larrañaga spent the night in the town of Las Víboras, information that can be found in his travel diary from Montevideo to Paysandú. The following year, on February 12, from Purificación, Artigas signed the decree to transfer the Town of Las Víboras to the Port of Las Vacas and Río Uruguay.

Isidoro Rodríguez served as territorial mayor of Las Víboras in 1822. Then in 1830 he attended the Jura de la Constitución as civil judge of Las Víboras. The following year he was appointed First Political and Police Chief of the Colonia Department. In addition, in 1837 he was appointed president of the Land Commission of the Department of Colonia, and in 1841 he was appointed justice of the peace of El Carmelo. In 1842 he was appointed commander of the El Carmelo National Guard, to end in 1846, where Colonel Jaime Montoro was defeated and the war ended with the town.

== Location ==
The town is located in Colonia Department, a few kilometers from the city of Carmelo, from which it can be accessed by Route 97.

== Population ==
Its estimated population in 2014 was 2,052 inhabitants.
