= El Semillero =

- Hamlet
- Location in Uruguay
- Coordinates: 34°20′0″S 57°42′0″W
- Country: Uruguay
- Department: Colonia Department

Population (2011)
  - Total: 600
- Time zone: UTC -3
- Postal code: 70002
- Dial plan: +598 4574 (+4 digits)

El Semillero is a caserío (hamlet) in the Colonia Department of southwestern Uruguay.

== Geography ==
The hamlet is located on Route 50, halfway between its junction with Route 1 and the small town of Tarariras. Its distance by road from the capital of the department, Colonia del Sacramento, is about 24 kilometres (15 mi).

== Population ==
In 2011 El Semillero had a population of 600.

Year	Population
1963	271
1975	342
1985	468
1996	375
2004	523
2011	600

Source: Instituto Nacional de Estadística de Uruguay
