= Carmelo Bridge =

Uruguayan bridge

Coordinates: 34°00′13″S 58°17′05″W

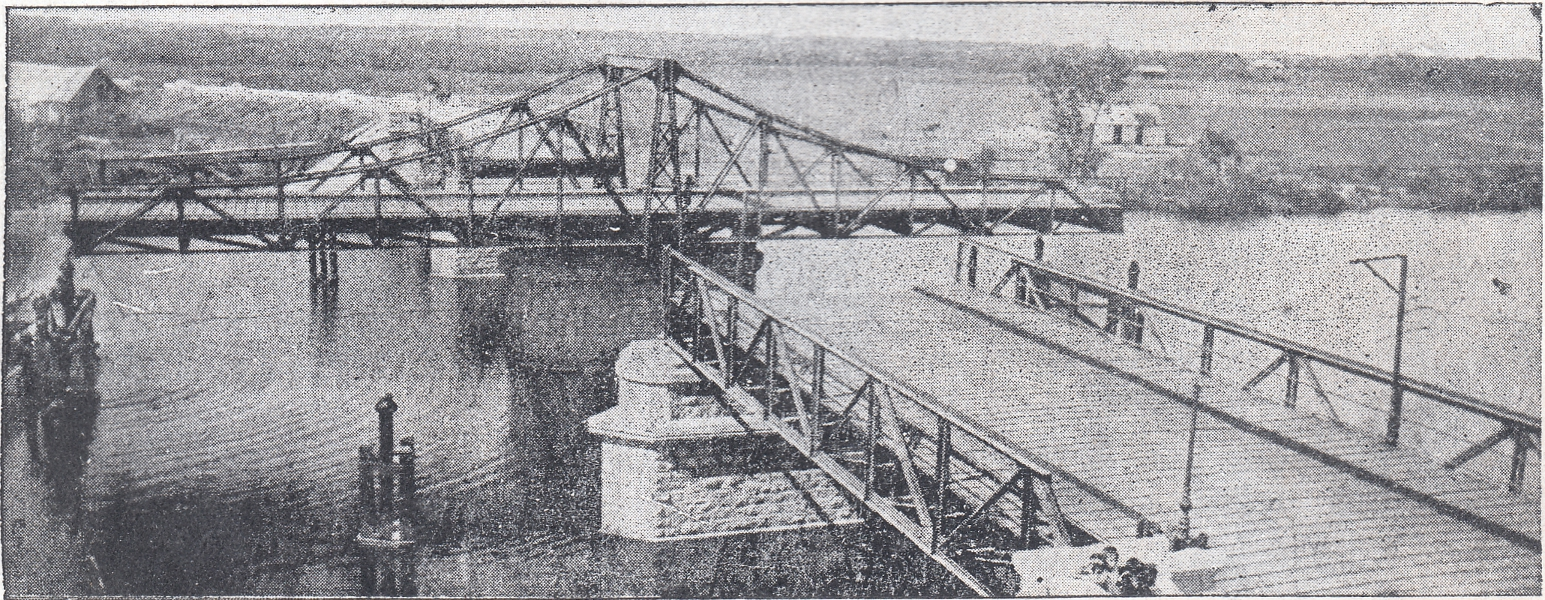
The bridge at the time of its inauguration in 1912

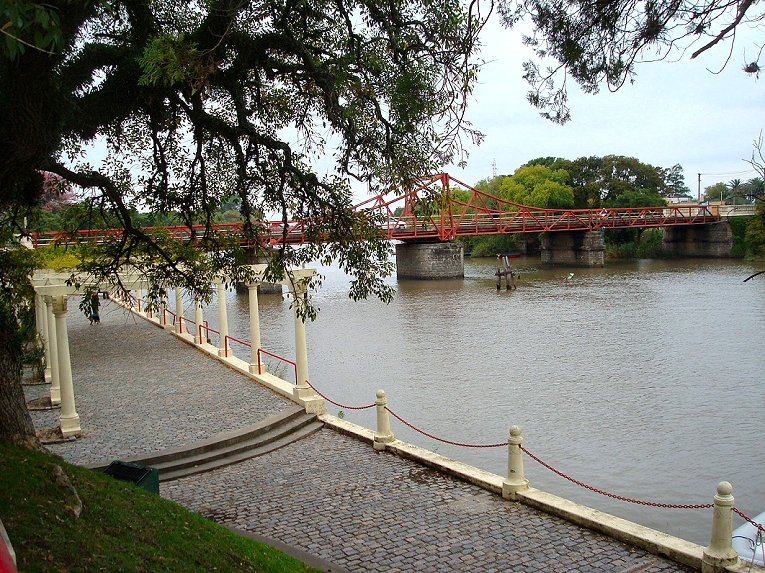
The bridge in April 2011

The Carmelo bridge is a swing bridge located over the Arroyo de las Vacas, near the city of Carmelo, Uruguay. Its turning mechanism is human-powered, which makes it the only one of its kind in Uruguay.
It is considered to be the first swing bridge in South America.

== Historical review ==
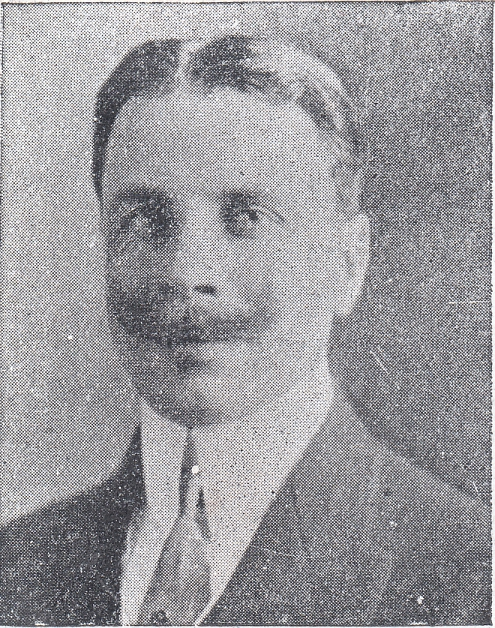
Engineer Juan Tomás Smith (24 January 1854 – 18 January 1930)

The bridge was manufactured in Germany by MAN (Maschinenfabrik Augsburg-Nürnberg). Its construction and assembly in Uruguay were under the supervision of engineers Juan T. Smith and Eduardo Chiappori.

At its inauguration on 1 May 1912 attended by national authorities as the senior officer of the Ministry of Public Works, Pedro C. Rodriguez, Senator Albin and deputies Joaquin C. Sanchez and Max Bélinzon, which came aboard the steamer Oyarvide.

In November 1951, during a storm, it suffered damage to its turning system, when it was hit by boats that were dragged by the current. The bridge had to be closed for repair work. During this time a temporary pontoon bridge was placed. The fix was finalized in April 1952, the swing bridge was rehabilitated for traffic, and the makeshift bridge was dismantled.

In 2012, the bridge was still used for heavy cargo transportation. It had to support a weight well above 5000 kg originally planned, which has caused a notable deterioration over time.

On its 100th anniversary, the bridge was visited by national and departmental authorities, such as President José Mujica, Minister of Transportation Enrique Pintado and the Mayor of Colonia del Sacramento, Walter Zimmer. The bridge was declared a National Historic Landmark in 1994.

In January 2016, the project for the construction of a new bridge over the Las Vacas stream was put out to tender. This new bridge, together with a route that allows bypassing the city, would absorb passing traffic, leaving the revolving bridge for local traffic.

On December 15, 2018, the bridge was hit by three boats dragged by water currents that pulled the 160-ton central span from its pivoting support and displaced it considerably. This forced it to be disabled for vehicle use. It was only in the first days of January 2019 that the circulation of light vehicles (cars and motorcycles) could be restored as the helmets that rested against the structure were able to move. On January 23, 2019 the last of the damaged vessels was removed, with additional repair work scheduled until the end of February 2019. It was finally restored to its original state, reopening on February 23, 2019, along with a new lighting.

== Technical characteristics ==
It is a cantilevered iron bridge, on a central stone masonry support. It has a length of 88 m.

== Literature ==
- El alma de Carmelo. El Puente Giratorio (Raúl Ronzoni 2012)
- Uniendo orillas. Uniendo siglos (Laura Ciapessoni. 2012)
- 100 años de nuestro Puente Giratorio (Ed. Librería Bombaci. Miguel Bombaci. 2012)

== See also ==
- History of Uruguay
