= Iribarren =

Iribarren may refer to:

- Iribarren (surname), a Basque surname
- Iribarren Municipality, in the Venezuelan state of Lara
- Iribarren number, used in fluid dynamics to describe types of breaking waves and their effects on beaches and coastal structures
