= Municipality of Cardona =

Cardona
- Municipality
- Interactive map of Cardona
- Coordinates: 33.8589°S 57.23823°W
- Country: Uruguay
- Department: Soriano
- Founded: 15 March 2010
- Seat: Cardona

Government
  - Mayor: Gabriel Bentancur
- Demonym: cardonense

Cardona is a Uruguayan municipality located in the department of Soriano. Its seat is the city of Cardona.

== History ==
The municipality of Cardona was created on March 15, 2010, by Law 18653, located within the department of Soriano, comprising the MFA constituency of the department.
