= Santiago Ostolaza =

Uruguayan footballer and manager (born 1962)

Personal information
- Full name: Santiago Javier Ostolaza Sosa
- Date of birth: 10 July 1962 (age 64)
- Place of birth: Dolores, Soriano, Uruguay
- Height: 1.90 m (6 ft 3 in)
- Position: Midfielder

Team information
- Current team: Uruguay U17 (Head Coach)

Senior career*
Years	Team	Apps	(Gls)
1980–1986	Bella Vista		
1986–1990	Nacional		
1990–1992	Cruz Azul	72	(8)
1992	Querétaro	38	(2)
1992–1993	Gimnasia La Plata	13	(3)
1994	Kyoto Sanga		
1995	Defensor Sporting		
1995	Olimpia		
1996	Nacional	20	(1)
1997	Aurora		
1998–1999	Rentistas	24	(0)
1999	Defensor Sporting		
2000	Montevideo Wanderers	18	(1)

International career
1985–1993	Uruguay	43	(6)

Managerial career
- 2001: River Plate (URU)
- 2001: Deportivo Maldonado
- Montevideo Wanderers
- 2004: Nacional
- Real Sociedad de Zacatecas
- Alacranes de Durango
- 2009: Guerreros de Hermosillo
- 2011: ESPOLI
- 2014–: Uruguay U17
Medal record
Men's association football
Representing Uruguay
Pan American Games
Gold medal – first place	1983 Caracas	Team
- * Club domestic league appearances and goals

Santiago Javier Ostolaza Sosa (born 10 July 1962 in Dolores, Soriano) is a Uruguayan former football midfielder and the current manager of the Uruguayan U-17 national team. Among others clubs, he was manager for Nacional of Uruguay. He played for the same team when he was a player, and in 1988 he received the prize as man of the match after the Intercontinental Cup final against PSV Eindhoven, in which he scored two goals.

Ostolaza made 43 appearances for the Uruguay national football team from 1985 to 1993 and played at the 1990 FIFA World Cup.

He has a son, also named Santiago Ostolaza, who currently plays for Montevideo Wanderers.
