= La Paz, Colonia =

La Paz
- Village
- Location in Uruguay
- Coordinates: 34°21′0″S 57°18′0″W
- Country: Uruguay
- Department: Colonia Department

Population (2011)
  - Total: 603
- Time zone: UTC -3
- Postal code: 70203
- Dial plan: +598 455 (+5 digits)

La Paz, also known as Colonia Piamontesa, is a village in the Colonia Department of southwestern Uruguay. Founded in 1858 by Italian immigrants affiliated with the Waldensian Evangelical Church, it was the first of several Waldensian agricultural colonies established by European immigrants in the second half of the 19th century.

== Geography ==
The village is located on Route 52, 2.5 kilometres (1.6 mi) south of Route 1. It is about 5 kilometres (3.1 mi) southwest of Colonia Valdense and 9 kilometres (5.6 mi) southwest of Nueva Helvecia.

== History ==
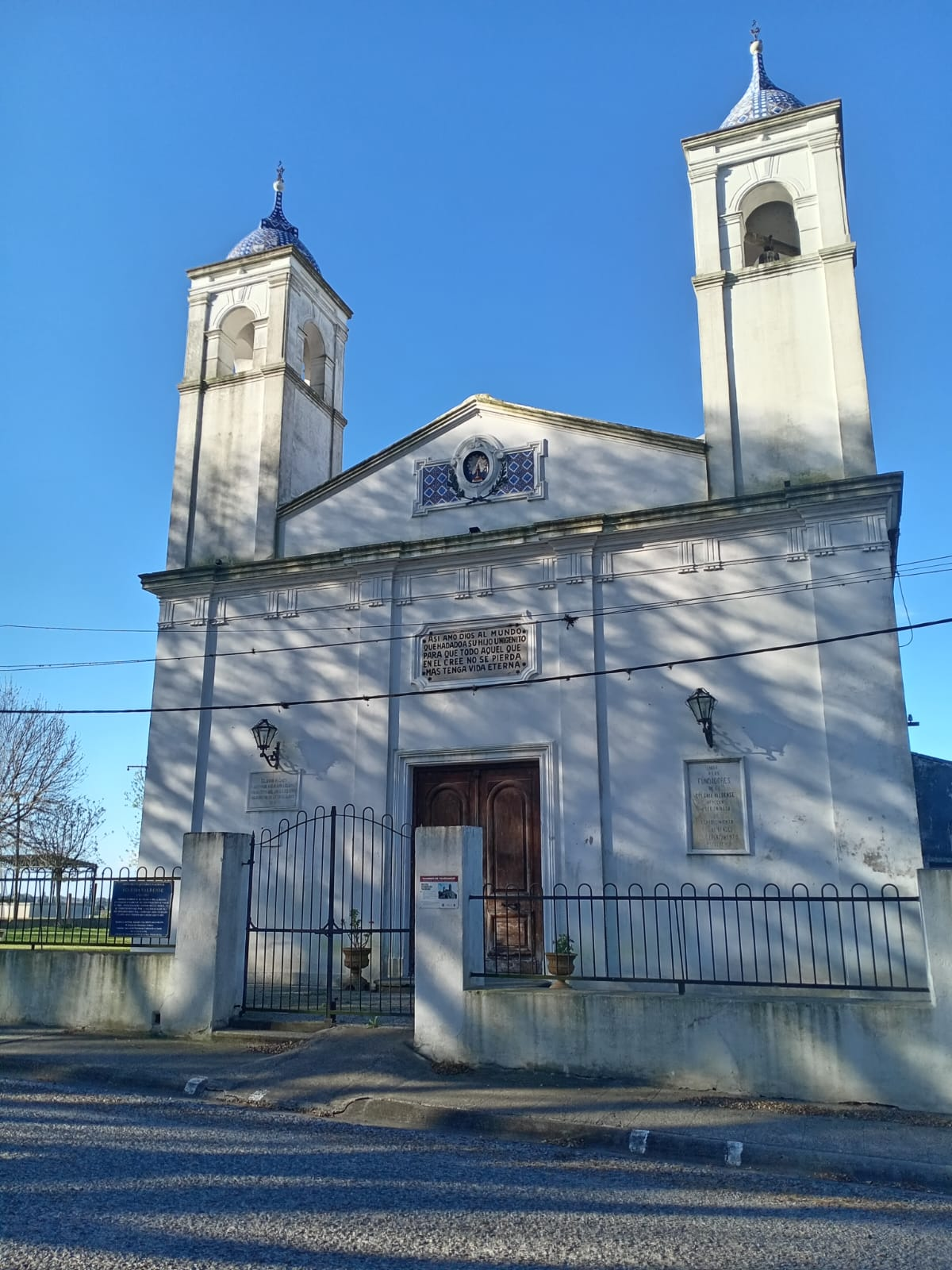
Waldensian Evangelical Church of the Piedmontese Colony, inaugurated in 1877.

This village was established in 1858 as a Waldensian colony. In the early 1850s, a group of Italian immigrants from the Piedmont region who were adherents to the Waldensian Evangelical Church arrived in Montevideo, where they established contact with actors involved in the process of land settlement in the Uruguayan countryside following the end of the Uruguayan Civil War. Between 1856 and 1858, approximately 200 Waldensian settlers arrived and initially settled in the Florida Department; however, due to opposition from the Catholic Church, they were relocated to the Colonia Department.

The entrepreneur Doroteo García, founder of the Sociedad Agrícola del Rosario Oriental—an organization established to promote rural settlement in the Colonia Department—began surveying the land in September 1858, and the settlement was formally established on 17 October. Under the terms of the agreement between the settler community and the Sociedad Agrícola del Rosario Oriental, the colony was to be named Colonia Agrícola del Rosario Oriental (Spanish for 'Eastern Rosario Agricultural Colony'); however, this designation did not become established, and the names “Colonia Piamontesa” and “La Paz” instead came into common use. In the following months, further groups of Waldensian settlers continued to arrive, who were primarily engaged in agricultural activities.

As a result of successive waves of immigration, other Waldensian settlements were established in the surrounding area, including Colonia Valdense, which later developed into a comparatively more urbanized center than La Paz.

== Population ==
In 2011 La Paz had a population of 603.

Year	Population
1963	535
1975	542
1985	544
1996	644
2004	653
2011	603

Source: National Statistics Institute

== Places of worship ==
- Waldensian Evangelical Church (Waldensians)
- Holy Cross Chapel (Roman Catholic)
