= Palmar, Uruguay =

Palmar
- Village
- Location in Uruguay
- Coordinates: 33°3′44″S 57°27′35″W
- Country: Uruguay
- Department: Soriano Department

Population (2011)
  - Total: 456
- Time zone: UTC -3
- Postal code: 75004
- Dial plan: +598 453 (+5 digits)

Palmar is a village in the Soriano Department of western Uruguay.

== Geography ==
The village is located on Route 55 and the south bank of Río Negro, just south of the Palmar Dam. It lies about 75 kilometres (47 mi) east of Mercedes and at the border with Río Negro Department.

== History ==
On 26 March 1982, the urban conglomeration named "Coronel Lorenzo Latorre", which had been formed in 1973 as a result of the construction of the Palmar Dam, was given the status of "Pueblo" (village) by the Act of Decreto-Ley Nº 15.254. On 28 December 1990, it was renamed "Palmar" by the Act of Ley Nº 16.170.

== Population ==
In 2011 Palmar had a population of 381.

Year	Population
1985	834
1996	703
2004	471
2011	381

Source: Instituto Nacional de Estadística de Uruguay
