= Miguelete, Uruguay =

Miguelete Colonia Miguelete
- Village
- Location in Uruguay
- Coordinates: 34°0′0″S 57°39′0″W
- Country: Uruguay
- Department: Colonia Department
- Founded: 1909

Population (2011)
  - Total: 999
- Time zone: UTC -3
- Postal code: 70005
- Dial plan: +598 4575 (+4 digits)

Miguelete or Colonia Miguelete is a village in the Colonia Department of southwestern Uruguay.

== Geography ==
It is located on Route 106, a small distance south of its intersection with Route 54, about 63 kilometres (39 mi) north-northeast of the department capital Colonia del Sacramento.

== History ==
Miguelete was founded on 27 March 1909. Its status was elevated to "Pueblo" (village) category on 8 November 1942 por Ley No. 10.113.

There is a nearby creek of the same name.

== Population ==
In 2011 Miguelete had a population of 999.

Year	Population
1908	2,795
1963	438
1975	536
1985	649
1996	893
2004	979
2011	999

Source: Instituto Nacional de Estadística de Uruguay

== Famous people ==
- Santiago Urrutia, race driver
