= Carmelo, Uruguay =

Carmelo
- City
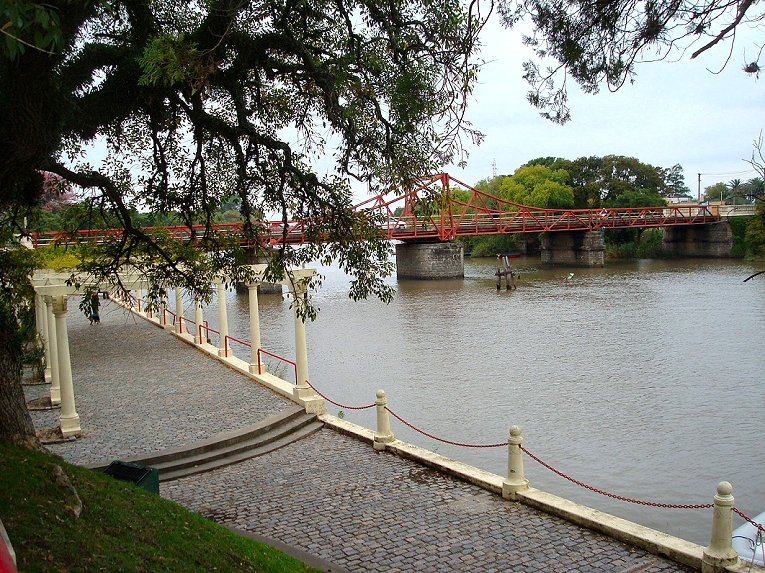
- The Swing Bridge of Carmelo over the Arroyo de las Vacas

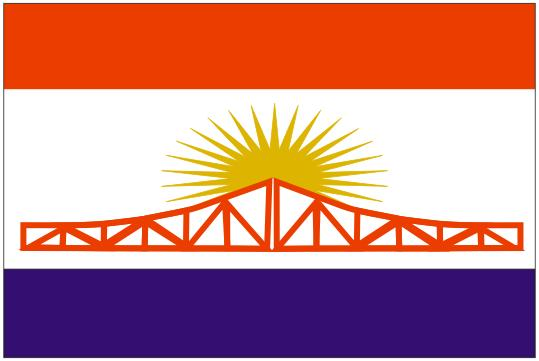
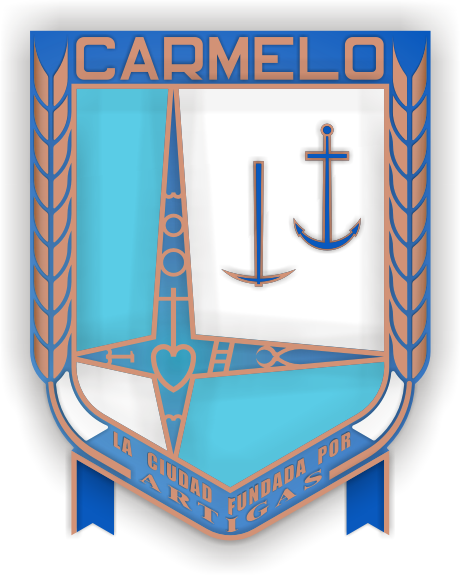
- Flag Seal

- Location within Uruguay
- Coordinates: 34°00′0″S 58°17′0″W
- Country: Uruguay
- Department: Colonia
- Founded: 12 February 1816
- Founder: José Gervasio Artigas

Population (2011 Census)
  - Total: 18,041
- Time zone: UTC -3
- Postal code: 70100
- Dial plan: +598 4542 (+4 digits)
- Website: http://www.ciudadcarmelo.com/

Carmelo is a city located in the department of Colonia of western Uruguay, noted for its wineries.

== Geography ==
=== Location ===
Route 21 passes through the city, joining it with Nueva Palmira to the northwest and Colonia del Sacramento to the southeast.

== History ==
During the beginning of the Conquest of the 16th century, the Spanish founded the Fuerte de San Lázaro (April 7, 1527 - October 1530). In 1611, Hernando Arias de Saavedra, governor of Asunción, landed cattle near the mouth of the Arroyo de las Vacas. A populated centre was established here which had reached the status of "Pueblo" (village) before the Independence of Uruguay. The present city was founded by José Gervasio Artigas on 12 February 1816. Its status was elevated to "Ciudad" (city) on 17 August 1920 by the Act of Ley Nº 7.257. It is the only city founded personally by the Uruguayan national hero, and it still holds this office proudly.

== Population ==
In 2011 Carmelo had a population of 18,041.

Year	Population
1908	9,364
1963	12,705
1975	13,707
1985	14,278
1996	16,658
2004	16,866
2011	18,041

Source: Instituto Nacional de Estadística de Uruguay

== Landmarks ==
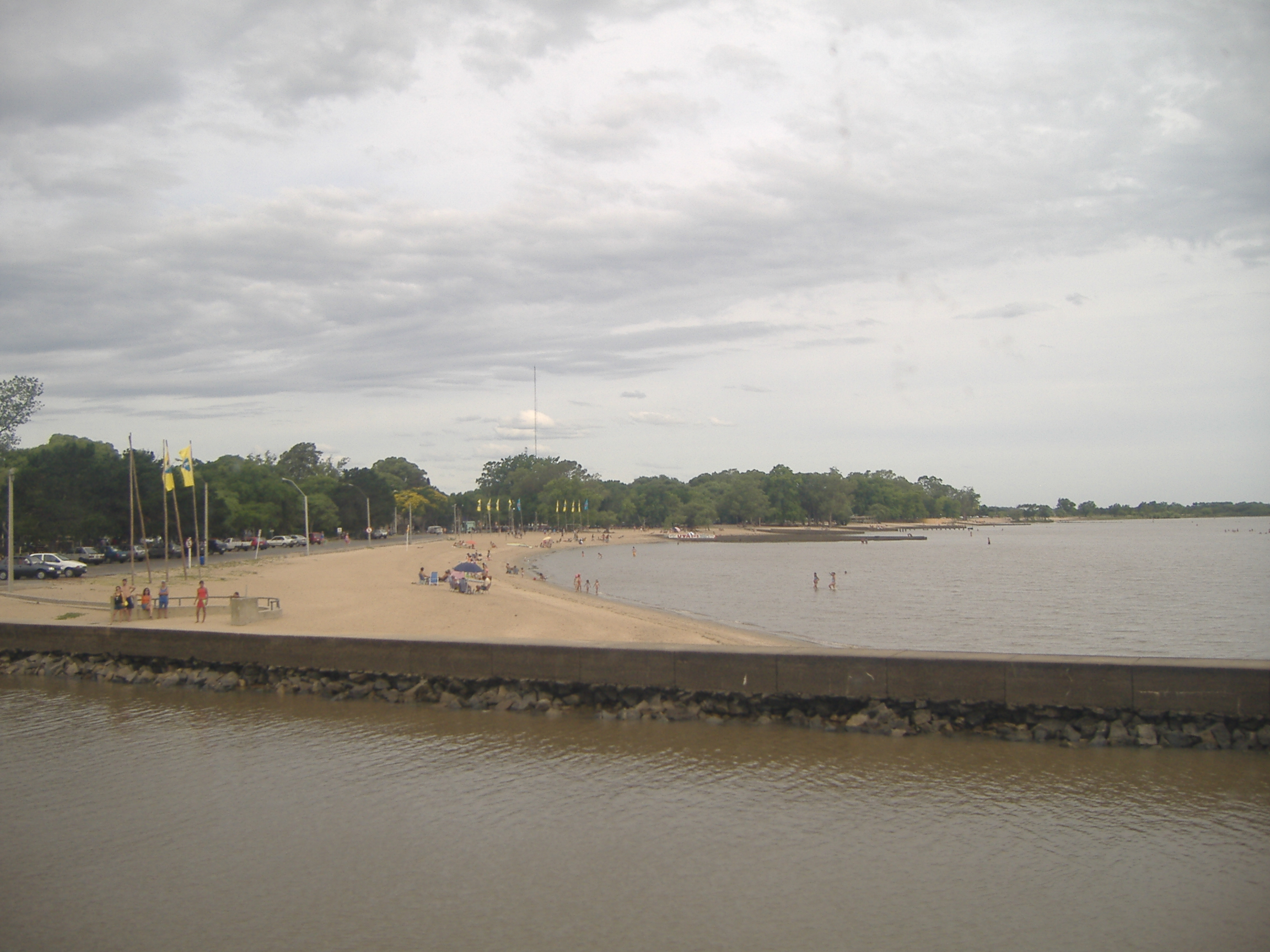
View of Carmelo's beach

There are two squares in the city. The one is Plaza Artigas, with a monument to the foundation of the city, the church Templo Histórico del Carmen and the city museum and archive. The other, more central square is the commercial centre of the city. The main commercial street is 19 de Avril, which at its south ends at the bridge, after which it becomes Route 21 which joins it with Colonia del Sacramento and also forks towards other destinations.

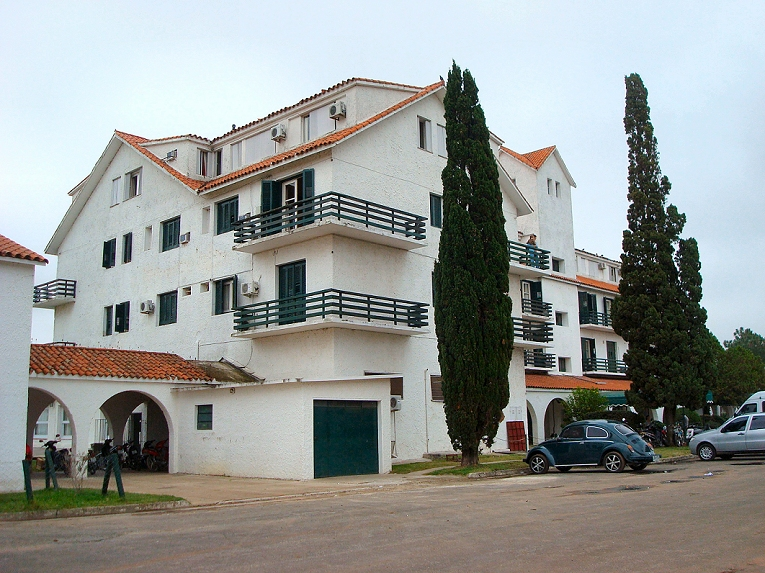
Hotel Casino de Carmelo

The river Arroyo de las Vacas runs along the east and south part of the city. This river serves as a port for the town. On its north bank there is the Puerto Carmelo-Tigre, where small catamaran boats carry passengers across the Río de la Plata to Argentina. A swing bridge, the Puente Giratorio de Carmelo, which opened on 1 May 1912, passes over the Arroyo de las Vacas. The bridge joins the north part of the city with its small southern part, where another port along the southern banks of the river accommodates private boats and the Yacht Club Carmelo. In the same part, along the coast there is beach Playa Seré, a park, a small zoological garden and a Casino Hotel.

== Places of worship ==
- Our Lady of Mt. Carmel Parish Church (Roman Catholic)
- Our Lady of Pompei Church (Roman Catholic)

== Symbols of Carmelo ==
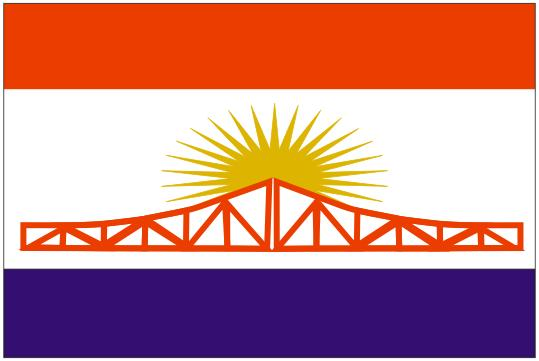
Flag of Carmelo

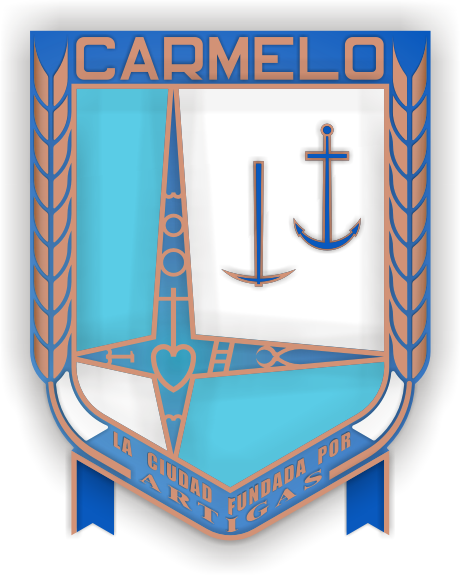
Seal of Carmelo

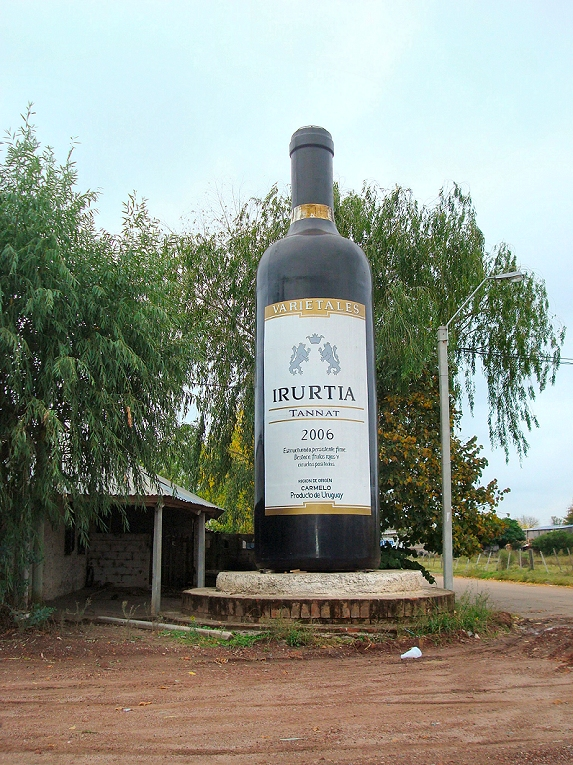
Wines of Carmelo

== The area around the city ==
Between Nueva Palmira and Carmelo there is a stretch along the Río Uruguay of great tourist importance. Points of interest in this area are Punta Gorda, Zagarzazú and Colonia Estrella. In Zagarzazú there is a small airport and a luxury hotel, the Four Seasons Carmelo Hotel, with an important golf course.

Just northwest of Carmelo is Juncal Island which once held a notorious prison. The city is a few kilometers from the town of Las Víboras.

== Sport ==
The city is represented in the regional Liga MVD by Carmelo Fútbol Club, which was founded on November 10, 2021.

== Notable people ==
- Juan Francisco Aragone, Archbishop of Montevideo
- Gonzalo Pérez Iribarren, mathematician
- Juan Carlos Mareco, actor
- Atilio François, former cyclist
- José Reinoso, musician
- Javier Gil, painter, sculptor
- Lucy Cordano, mother of president José Mujica
- Daniel E. Jorge, Olympic rower in 1972
- Jorge Buenahora, Olympic rower in 1972
- Pedro Ciappesoni, Olympic rower in 1972
- Francisco Lucas Roselli, palaeontologist
