= Colonia Valdense =

- City
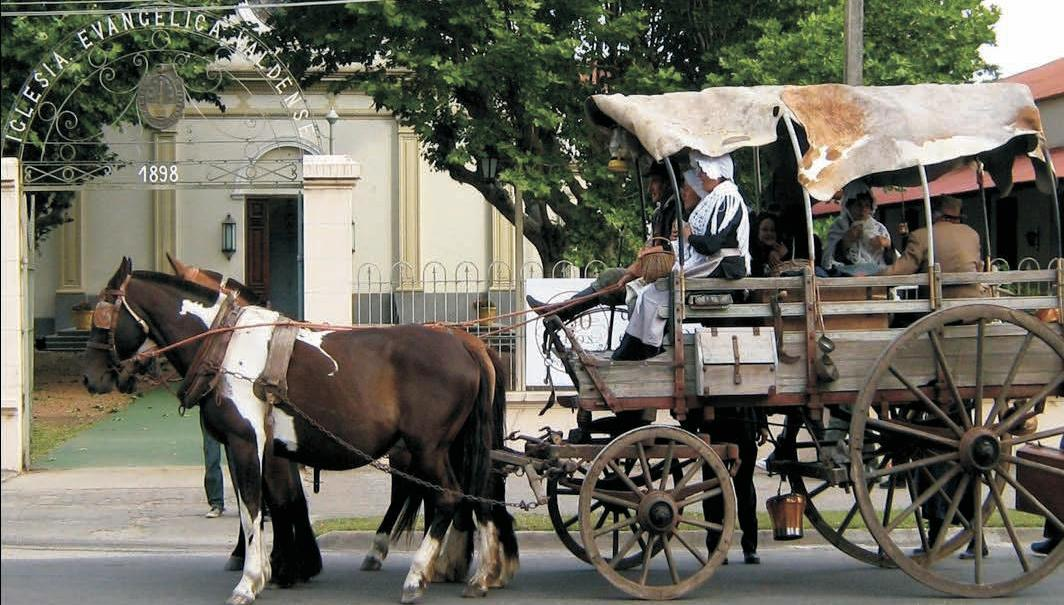
- Celebrations of the 150th anniversary of the arrival of Italian immigrants.

- Location within Uruguay
- Coordinates: 34°20′23.6″S 57°15′47.1″W
- Country: Uruguay
- Department: Colonia
- Elevation: 34 m (112 ft)

Population (2011 Census)
  - Total: 3,235
- Time zone: UTC -3
- Postal code: 70400
- Dial plan: +598 455 (+5 digits)

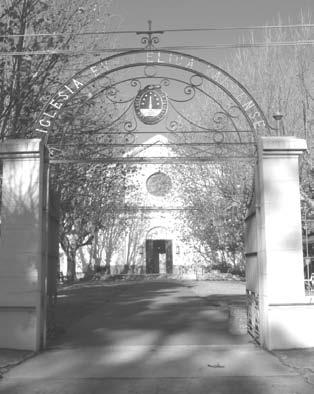
Temple of the Iglesia Evangélica Valdense

Colonia Valdense is a city located in the Colonia Department, in southwestern Uruguay. Situated between the Sarandí Grande stream and the Rosario River, it was founded in the 1850s by Italian immigrants who were adherents of the Waldensian Evangelical Church, and originated as an agricultural settlement.

The city is noted for preserving the heritage and traditions of its founders and for its location within Uruguay’s principal dairy-producing region, with a significant presence of dairy production. It also serves as the administrative seat of the Waldensian Evangelical Church of the River Plate.

== Geography ==
It lies along Route 1, 120 kilometres (75 mi) west of Montevideo and about 2 kilometres (1.2 mi) west of its intersection with Route 51.

== History ==
Colonia Valdense was founded in 1858, following the arrival of Italian immigrants from Piedmont, especially from the Waldensian Valleys and the Aosta Valley. The town is named after Pierre Valdo, a French merchant, founder of the religious movement known as "The Waldensians". The Waldensian Evangelical Church, which is now a Protestant church, has a strong presence here.

== Language ==
Spoken dialect was the Patois, which was an occitan dialect spoken in the town of Villar Pellice in Italy from where the settlers were originated. The dialect was spoken mainly in the Colonia Department, where the first pilgrims settled, in the city called La Paz, Colonia. Today it is considered a dead language, although some elders at the mentioned location still practice it. There are still written tracts of the language in the Waldensians Library (Biblioteca Valdense) in the town of Colonia Valdense, Colonia Department. Patois speaker arrived to Uruguay from the Piedmont. They were Waldensians, members of the oldest Protestant church in Italy, giving their name to the city Colonia Valdense which translated from the Spanish means Waldensians Colony.

Its status was elevated to "Pueblo" (village) on 6 November 1951 by the Act of Ley N° 11.742. On 24 September 1982, it was renamed to "Colonia Valdense" and its status was elevated to "Ciudad" (city) by the Act of Decreto-Ley N° 15.323.

== Population ==
According to the 2011 census, Colonia Valdense had a population of 3,235.

Year	Population
1963	1,663
1975	2,140
1985	2,409
1996	2,876
2004	3,087
2011	3,235

Source: Instituto Nacional de Estadística de Uruguay

== Notable citizens ==
From 1936 to 1979, Annemarie Rübens, a German social activist lived in Colonia Valdense. Having fled from Nazi Germany, she founded a rural homestead for refugee children who were victims of the Nazi regime, called Casa Rubens. Later it was a daycare center for sons and daughters of political detainees, until Rübens was prohibited to return during the dictatorship in Uruguay. In 2016, the street in Colonia Valdense where Rübens had lived and given shelter to many children, was renamed after Ana María Rübens as a tribute to her life.

== Places of worship ==
- Waldensian Temple (Waldensians)
- Our Lady of Fatima Chapel (Roman Catholic)

== Twin towns ==
- Luserna San Giovanni, Italy
