= Ricardo Paseyro =

Uruguayan diplomat and poet

Ricardo Paseyro (1925, Mercedes –2009) was an Uruguayan diplomat and poet.
