= Annemarie Rübens =

German Lutheran theologian and activist (1900–1991)

- Born: May 24, 1900; Banfield, Argentina
- Died: May 21, 1991 (aged 90); Göttingen, Germany
- Resting place: Colonia Valdense, Uruguay
- Other name: Ana María Rubens
- Citizenship: Argentina, Germany
- Education: University of Marburg, Germany
- Occupations: Lutheran theologian, social activist

Annemarie Rübens (1900–1991), in Spanish Ana María Rubens, was a German Lutheran theologian and social activist. Born to German parents in Argentina, she lived both in Germany and Uruguay and was forced to go into exile during military rule in the respective history of both countries.

For more than 40 years, Rübens managed a rural homestead for refugee children who were victims of the Nazi regime and later other persecuted children in Colonia Valdense, In Uruguay. For her social activism in times of war and dictatorship, she was recognized in Germany and Uruguay.

== Biography ==
Rübens was born in Banfield, Buenos Aires province, the daughter of a Catholic father and a Lutheran mother, both of German origin. When she was nine years old, her parents decided to move to Germany. In 1920, she began to study theology at the University of Marburg, being part of the first group of women theologians admitted by the Evangelical Church in Germany. With eight other women, she founded the Association of Lutheran Women Theologians in 1925. The association demanded that women should be able to work as ministers "equal to that of men", with all duties and responsibilities, from preaching to baptisms, officiating at marriages and funerals. From 1927 onwards, Rübens taught religious education in vocational schools and retirement homes in Cologne.

Around the same time in the late 1920s, Rübens and her fellow women theologians joined the Social Democratic Party of Germany and the Brotherhood of Socialist Theologians. In October 1933, they were dismissed from their service by the church authorities. Rüben's dismissal was based on the fact that she prayed publicly for Jews and, that in a sermon on 2 April 1933, she expressed her criticism of the National Socialist rule and condemned the hatred against people who did not support the Nazi regime and Jewish fellow citizens.

After having fled to Holland, she worked with refugee families and then moved to Uruguay in 1936, where her brother had lived and left her a piece of real estate in Colonia Valdense. There, she founded a rural homestead for refugee children who were victims of the Nazi regime, called Casa Rubens, and which later became a daycare center for sons and daughters of political detainees. In addition, Rübens also made sure that the children did not lose their mother tongue and their cultural roots. During World War II, Rübens became an active member of the movement "The Other Germany", founded in Buenos Aires by German emigrants in 1937.

After having lived in Colonia Valdense for 40 years, Rübens was expelled from her adopted home in 1979 by the dictatorship of Uruguay, and from then on lived in West Germany. There, she worked for Amnesty International and finally moved to a retirement home in Göttingen. Rübens died there in 1990, and her ashes were buried in Colonia Valdense.

== Recognition ==
In 2008, a street in Montevideo was named in her honour. One year before her death, a daycare centre for children in a poor neighbourhood of Montevideo was named after her. In 2016, the street in Colonia Valdense where Rübens had lived and given shelter to many children, was renamed after Ana María Rübens, as a tribute to her life.
