= Tarariras =

- City
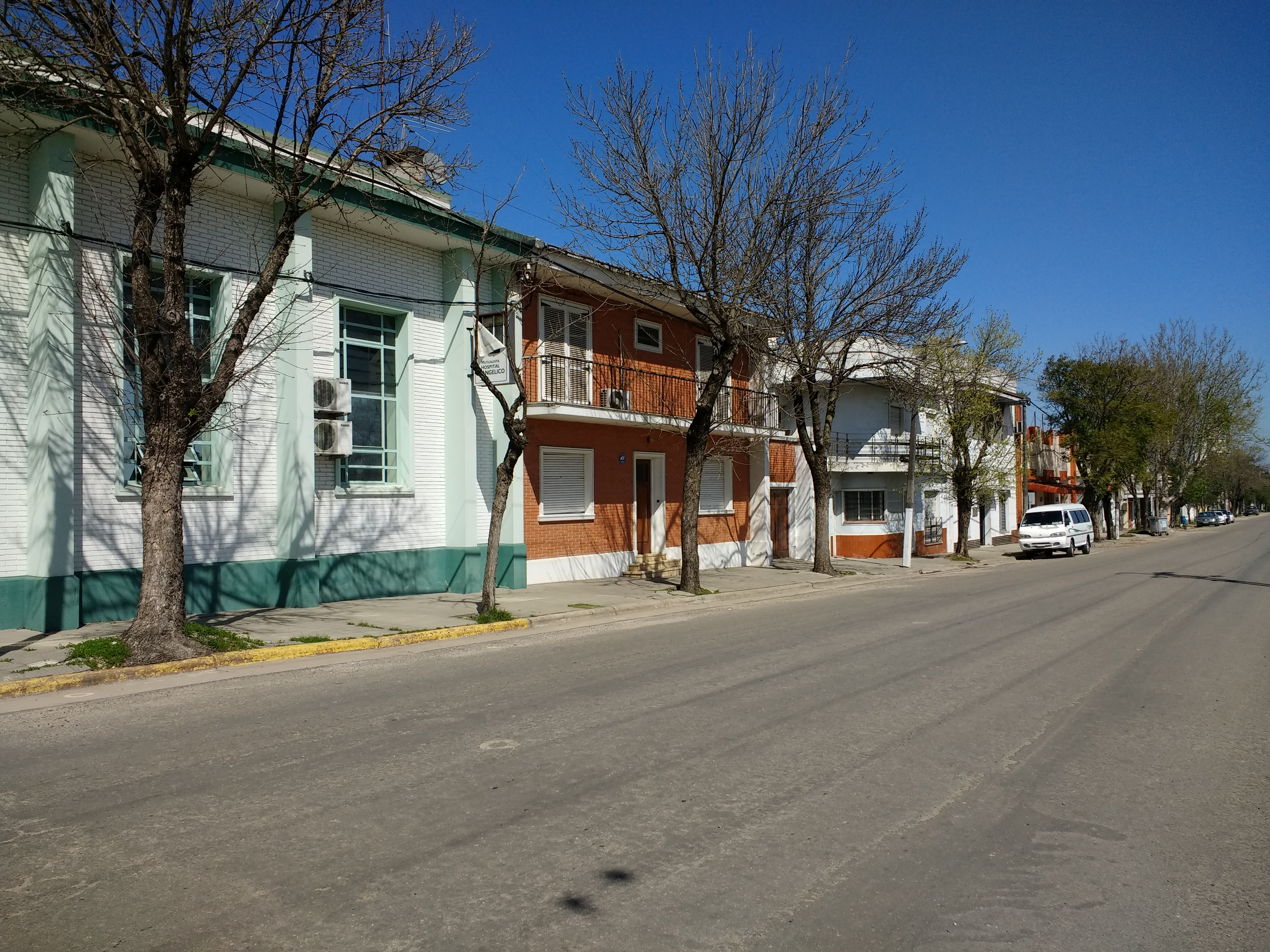

- Location within Uruguay
- Coordinates: 34°15′58″S 57°37′1″W
- Country: Uruguay
- Department: Colonia
- Founded: 1892
- Elevation: 73 m (240 ft)

Population (2023 Census)
  - Total: 7,269
- Time zone: UTC -3
- Postal code: 70002
- Dial plan: +598 4574 (+4 digits)

Tarariras, is a city (ciudad) and municipality in the Colonia Department of Uruguay. It had a population of 7,269 as per the 2023 census. The name of the city is derived from the nearby Tarariras stream, which flows into the San Juan River. It was given the status of "Ciudad" (city) in 1969.

== Etymology ==
While the city's name itself is derived from the nearby stream of Tarariras, there are several theories as to how Tarariras got its name. As per the magazine Tarariras, published in 1969, the word originated in the 17th century and roughly meant jesty or noisy.

During the colonial era, the region became a haven for nomads and smugglers, who referred to the area as Tarases meaning "an individual living outside the law". However, in the Historia de Tarariras, historian Daniel Bonnet claims that there is no evidence of the word being used to define such people. As per the State Railways Administration of Uruguay archives, the name of the stream originated from a fish of the same name.

== History ==
During the Spanish occupation, Tarariras was situated at the intersection of two major roads, one that connected Colonia del Sacramento with Manantiales and Cardona and the other linking the banks of the Río de la Plata and the San Juan River. The construction of railways meant that Tarariras became a major railhead on the route to Colonia del Sacramento, and the station opened on 4 February 1901. In 1900, the local court was established, and the first school came up in 1908. It received the name "Joaquín Suárez" and the status of "Pueblo" (village) by the Act of Ley N° 6.920 on 17 June 1919 and then on 27 August 1959 it was renamed to the original name of "Tarariras" and given the status of "Villa" (town) by the Act of Ley N° 12.621. It received the status of "Ciudad" (city) by the Act of Ley N° 13.783 on 7 November 1969.

== Geography ==
Tarariras is a city and municipality in the Colonia Department of Uruguay. The Tarirras stream located next to the city, is a tributary of the San Juan River. It is located in the south-central area of the department, at the junction of Route 50 with Route 22, about 37 km (23 mi) from Colonia del Sacramento, the capital city of the department. The city covers an area of 3.868 km^{2} (1.493 sq mi).

== Demographics ==
In 2011, Tarariras had a population of 6,632 inhabitants. It increased to 7,269 as per the 2023 census.

Year	Population
1963	2,979
1975	4,489
1985	5,305
1996	6,174
2004	6,070
2011	6,632

Source: Instituto Nacional de Estadística de Uruguay

As per the 2023 census, the population consisted of 3,558 males and 3,711 females. About 19.5% of the population was below the age of fourteen.
