= Chacras de Dolores =

- Populated rural area
- Location in Uruguay
- Coordinates: 33°33′0″S 58°13′0″W
- Country: Uruguay
- Department: Soriano Department

Population (2011)
  - Total: 1,961
- Time zone: UTC -3
- Postal code: 75100
- Dial plan: +598 4534 (+4 digits)

Chacras de Dolores, which means "Ranches of Dolores", is a populated rural area almost entirely surrounding the city of Dolores in the Soriano Department of western Uruguay. Its northern limit is the river Río San Salvador.

== Population ==
In 2011 Chacras de Dolores had a population of 1,961.

Year	Population
1996	2,337
2004	3,251
2011	1,961

Source: Instituto Nacional de Estadística de Uruguay
