= Rosario, Uruguay =

Rosario
- City
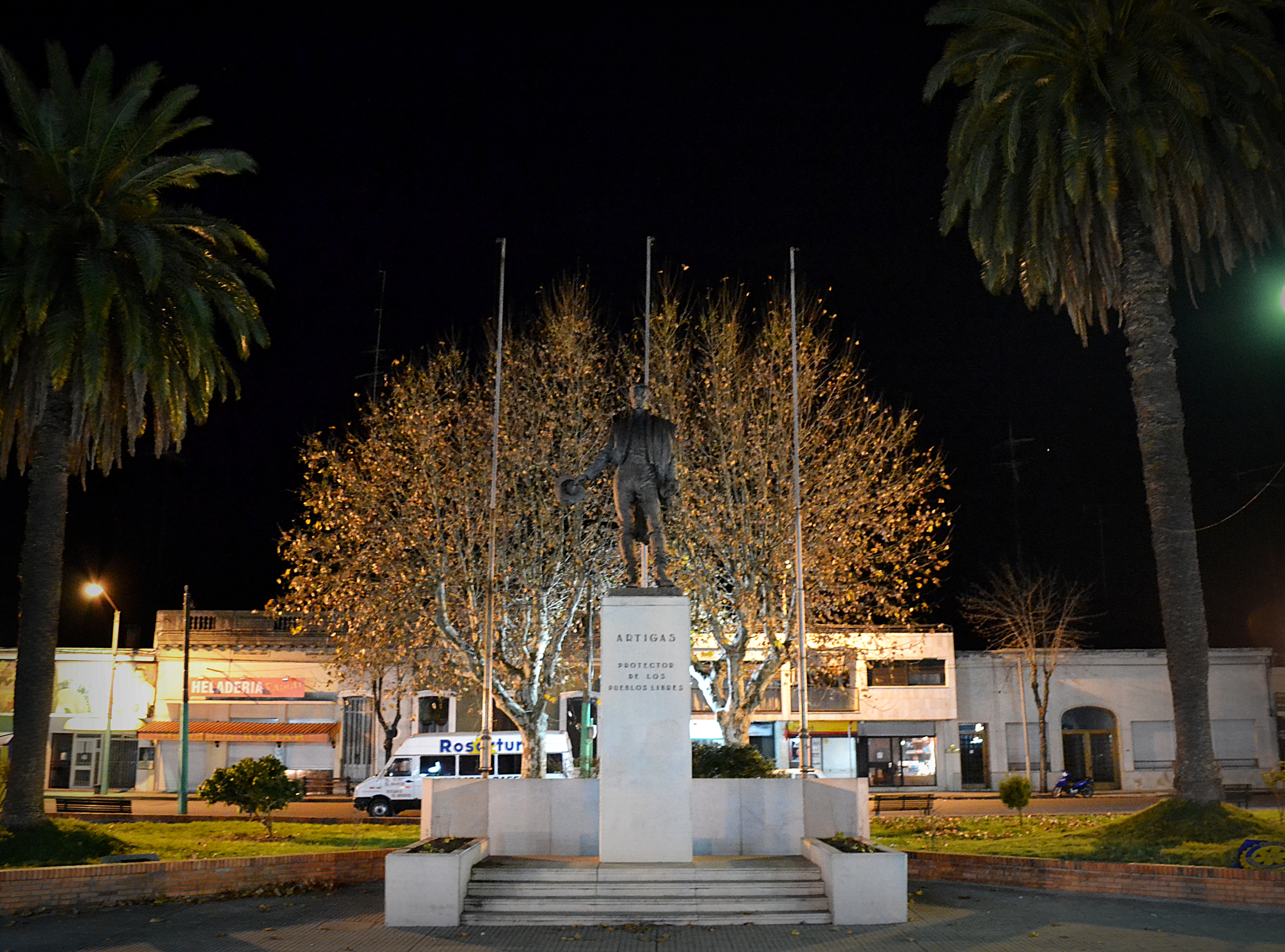
- Artigas monument

- Location within Uruguay
- Coordinates: 34°18′50″S 57°21′09″W
- Country: Uruguay
- Department: Colonia
- Founded: 1775
- Founder: Benito Herosa
- Elevation: 18 m (59 ft)

Population (2023)
  - Total: 10,584
- Time zone: UTC -3
- Postal code: 70200
- Dial plan: +598 455 (+5 digits)

Rosario is a city (ciudad) in the Colonia Department of Uruguay. It had a population of 10,584 inhabitants as per the 2023 census. The city was founded by Benito Herosa on 24 January 1775, during the Spanish colonial rule.

== History ==
Rosario was founded by Benito Herosa on 24 January 1775, and the only city in the Colonia Department to have been established by the Spanish colonialists. The city of Rosario originated around a chapel built on the order of the Bishop of Buenos Aires nearby military guard post. Herosa, who was appointed as the administrator of the chapel project in 1773, organized the settlement on behalf of the local residents. He petitioned the Spanish colonial authorities for the recognition of the town, and secured approval from viceroy Juan José de Vértiz y Salcedo in January 1775 for the establishment of the "Nueva Villa de Nuestra Señora del Rosario" (New Village of Our Lady of the Rosary). He later oversaw the surveying and distribution of lands in the town.

One of the first inhabitants of the city was the Pascual de Chena colla, from Arica, after whom the nearby stream of Colla and the Pascual de Chena square are named. The place witnessed a series of battles during the struggle for independence from Spain in 1811. The Rosario Social Club was established on 11 October 1953, and has been declared as a National Historical Monument by the Ministry of Education and Culture.

== Geography ==
Rosario is a ciudad (city) in the Colonia Department of Uruguay. It is located on the Río de la Plata river basin, about 25 km (16 mi) from the city of Tarariras, roughly in between the cities of Montevideo and Buenos Aires.

== Demographics ==
In 2011, Rosario had a population of 10,085. It increased to 10,584 as per the 2023 census. As per the 2023 census, the population consisted of 5,157 males and 5,427 females. About 16.9% of the population was below the age of fourteen.

Year	Population
1908	10,682
1963	7,705
1975	8,292
1985	8,879
1996	9,428
2004	9,311
2011	10,085*

Source: Instituto Nacional de Estadística de Uruguay
