= Jean-Michel Iribarren =

French author (born 1958)

Jean-Michel Iribarren (born 13 February 1958) is a French author. He is the author of L'insecte, a monologue in which the AIDS virus speaks and the author denounces the silence that surrounded the death of homosexuals at the beginning of epidemic.

== Works ==
=== Narratives ===
- L'Insecte (2000), éditions du Seuil

=== Poems ===
- Parce qu'eux (1989), éditions Saint-Germain-des-Près

=== Acting ===
- Puissance de la parole (1988), a film by Jean-Luc Godard
- Artificial eyes (1988), a film by Catherine Jouaffre
