= Waldensian Evangelical Church =

Italian Protestant denomination

- Chiesa Evangelica Valdese
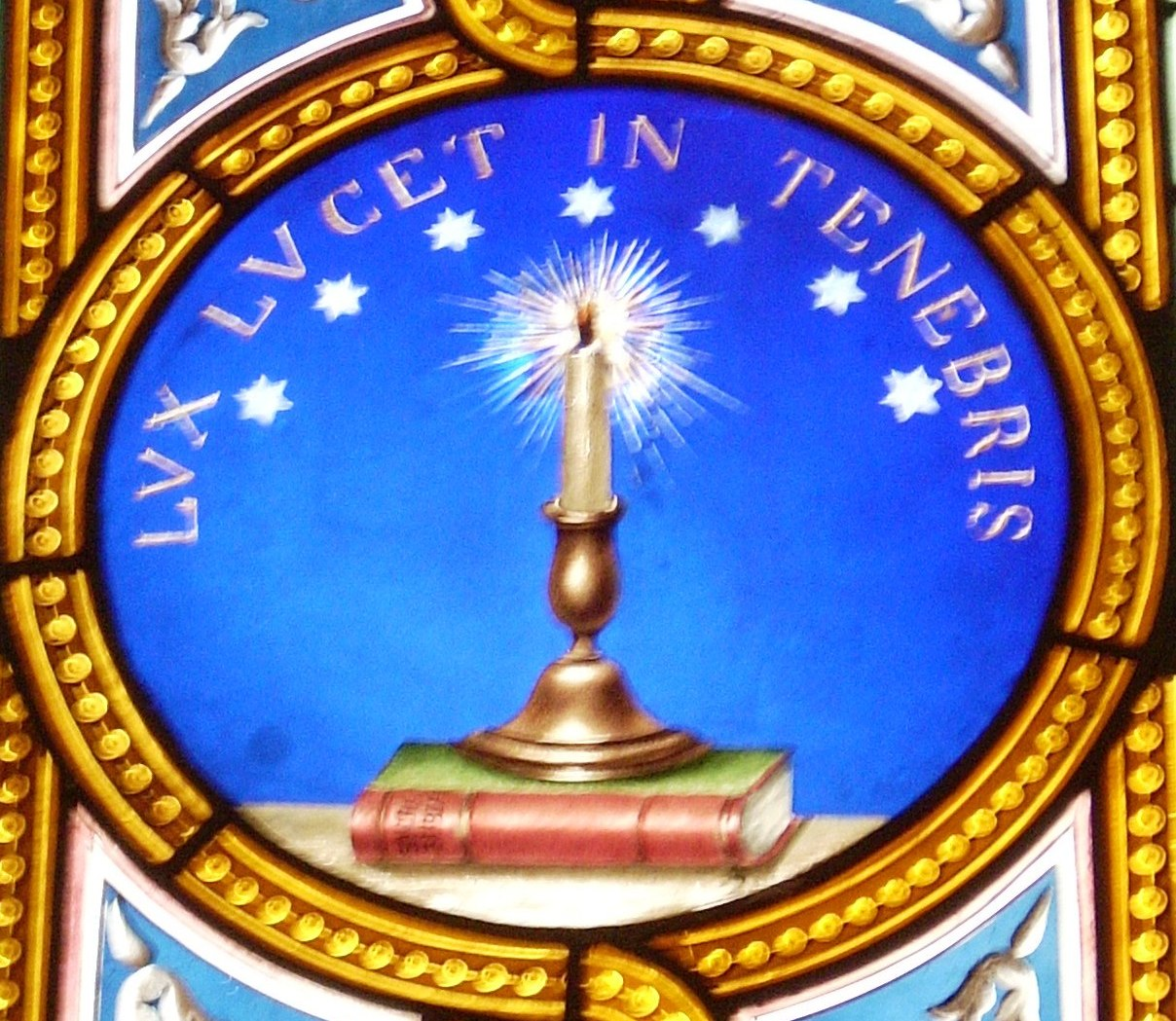
- Seal of the Waldensian Church
- Type: Religious sect
- Orientation: Waldensian
- Scripture: Christian Bible
- Theology: Reformed theology
- Polity: Presbyterian
- Associations: Union of Methodist and Waldensian Churches; Federation of Evangelical Churches in Italy; World Alliance of Reformed Churches; World Council of Churches; Waldensian Evangelical Church of the River Plate
- Territory: Italy, Switzerland
- Founder: Peter Waldo
- Origin: 12th century AD; Lyon, France
- Congregations: 170 in Italy; 7 in Switzerland
- Members: 25,000
- Official website: https://www.chiesavaldese.org/

The Waldensian Evangelical Church (Chiesa Evangelica Valdese, CEV) is a Protestant denomination active in Italy and Switzerland that was independent until it united with the Methodist Evangelical Church in Italy in the Union of Methodist and Waldensian Churches. Founded in the 12th century by Peter Waldo as a proto-Protestant group, since the 16th century Reformation it has adopted Calvinist theology and blended into the wider Calvinist tradition. It is one of several Protestant denominations with pre-Reformation roots, and is appraised by various denominations of Protestantism as its major successor.

The Church, after the Protestant Reformation, adhered to Calvinist theology and became the Italian branch of the Calvinist churches. As such, the church is a member of the World Communion of Reformed Churches.

In 1967, the church had 30,000 members in Italy (plus some 15,000 affiliates in Argentina and Uruguay), and was a founding member of the Federation of Evangelical Churches in Italy (FCEI), an ecumenical body comprising mainly historical Protestant denominations. In 1975 the CEV united with the Methodist Evangelical Church (5,000) to form the Union of Methodist and Waldensian Churches.

The organization of the Waldensian Evangelical Church is often described as a "hierarchy of assemblies" pursuant to article 7 of the Church General Regulation (called in Italian Disciplina Generale), as all decisions in the church must be made by collective organs and no authority can be recognized to a single person.

== See also ==
- Peter Waldo
- Waldensians
- Religion in Italy
- Christianity in Italy
- Protestantism in Italy
- List of Italian religious minority politicians
- Colonia Valdense, town in Uruguay
- John Charles Beckwith
- Luserna San Giovanni
- Val Pellice
- Waldensian valleys
