= Enrique Pintado =

Uruguayan politician

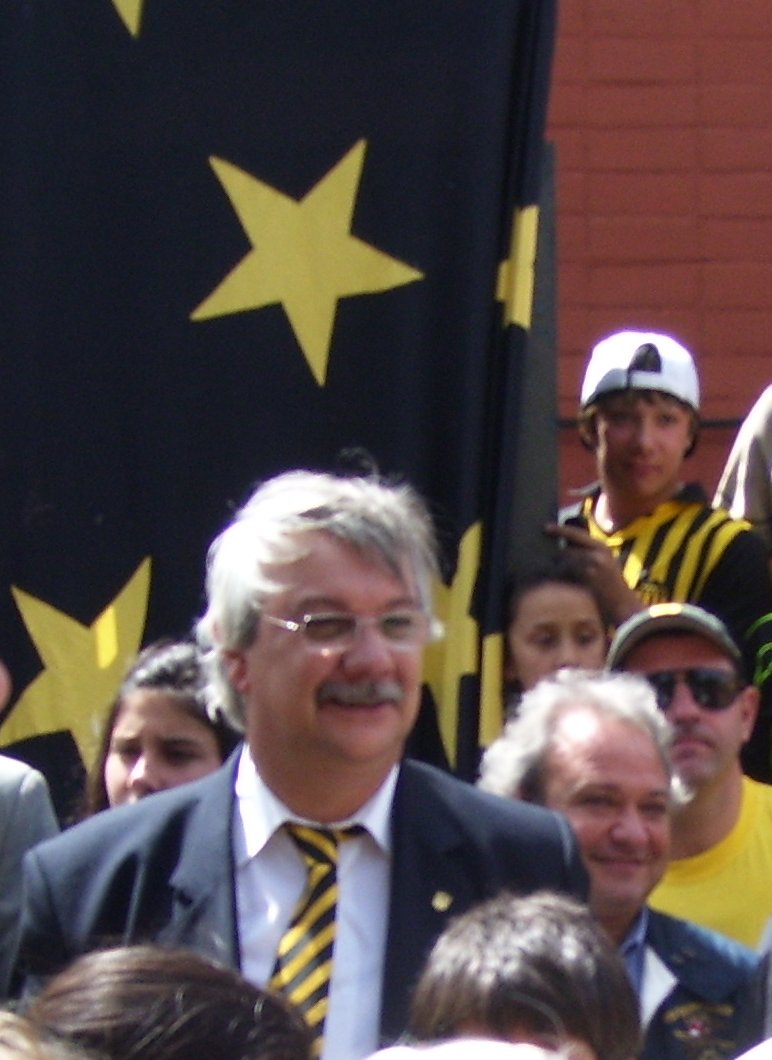
Enrique Pintado

Enrique Pintado (Montevideo, 1958) is a Uruguayan trade unionist and politician.

A member of the Broad Front (Uruguay Assembly), since 1 March 2010 he is the Minister of Transport and Public Works in the cabinet of President José Mujica.
