= Gabriel Iribarren =

Argentine footballer

Personal information
- Full name: Gabriel Alejandro Iribarren
- Date of birth: 6 August 1981 (age 45)
- Place of birth: Lanús, Argentina
- Height: 1.84 m (6 ft 0 in)
- Position: Midfielder

Team information
- Current team: Deportivo Santamarina
- Number: 10

Senior career*
Years	Team	Apps	(Gls)
2001–2004	Lanús	82	(3)
2004–2005	Tiro Federal	12	(0)
2005–2007	Gimnasia y Esgrima de Jujuy	13	(0)
2007–2009	FCV Dender EH	13	(1)
2009–2010	Zob Ahan	10	(2)
2011–2013	Deportivo Santamarina		
- * Club domestic league appearances and goals as of 22 April 2010

Gabriel Iribarren (born 6 August 1981) is an Argentine retired football player who played for Zob Ahan in the Iran Pro League.

== Club career ==
Iribarren joined Zob Ahan in 2010 and played in three Iran Pro League matches and seven AFC Champions League matches.

Club performance			League		Cup		Continental		Total	
Season	Club	League	Apps	Goals	Apps	Goals	Apps	Goals	Apps	Goals
Iran			League		Hazfi Cup		Asia		Total	
2009–10	Zob Ahan	Persian Gulf Cup	3	1			7	0		
Total	Iran		1	0			2	0		
Career total			1	0			2	0		

- Assists

Season	Team	Assists
09/10	Zob Ahan	1
