= Palmitas =

- Village
- Location in Uruguay
- Coordinates: 33°39′0″S 57°48′0″W
- Country: Uruguay
- Department: Soriano
- Municipality: Palmitas

Population (2011)
  - Total: 2,123
- Time zone: UTC -3
- Postal code: 75001
- Dial plan: +598 4537 (+4 digits)

Palmitas is a village in the Soriano Department of western Uruguay.

== Geography ==
The village is located 1 kilometre (0.62 mi) east of the intersection of Route 2 with Route 105, about 36 kilometres (22 mi) southeast of the department capital city Mercedes. The railroad track Montevideo - Mercedes pass through this town.

== History ==
Its status was elevated to "Pueblo" (village) on 6 November 1953 by the Act of Ley Nº 12.021. Previously it had been the head of the judicial section "Coquimbo".

== Population ==
In 2011 Palmitas had a population of 2,123.

Year	Population
1908	1,433
1963	1,288
1975	1,332
1985	1,531
1996	1,774
2004	1,954
2011	2,123

Source: Instituto Nacional de Estadística de Uruguay

== Places of worship ==
- Immaculate Conception Parish Church (Roman Catholic)
