= San Juan River (Uruguay) =

Coordinates: 34°16′26″S 57°59′21″W

Location
- Country: Uruguay

Physical characteristics
- Mouth
  - location: Río de la Plata
- Length: 77 km (48 mi)

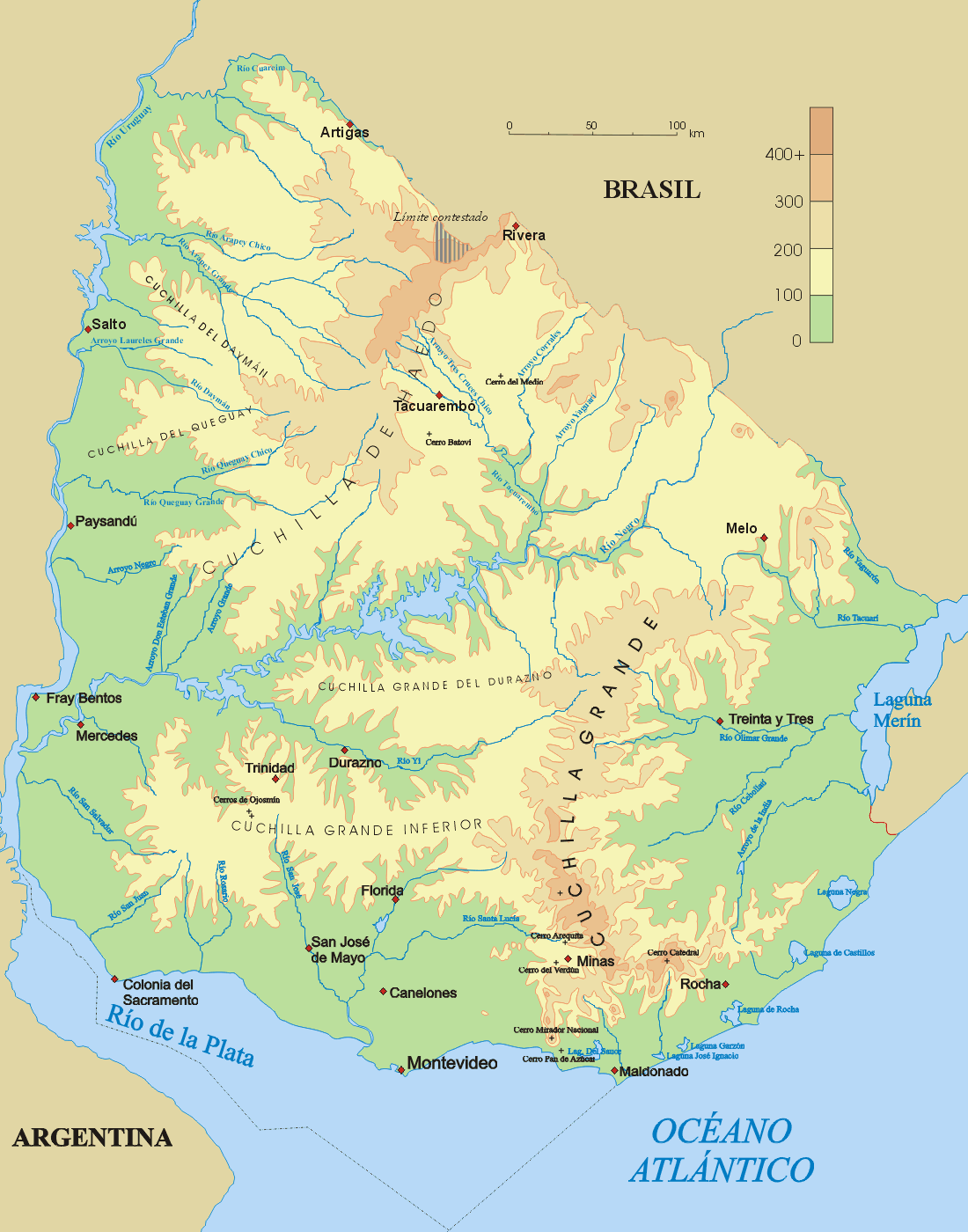
Topographical map of Uruguay

The San Juan River (Spanish, Río San Juan) is a river of Uruguay. It empties into the Río de la Plata.

== See also ==
- List of rivers of Uruguay
