= José Enrique Rodó, Uruguay =

José Enrique Rodó
- Town
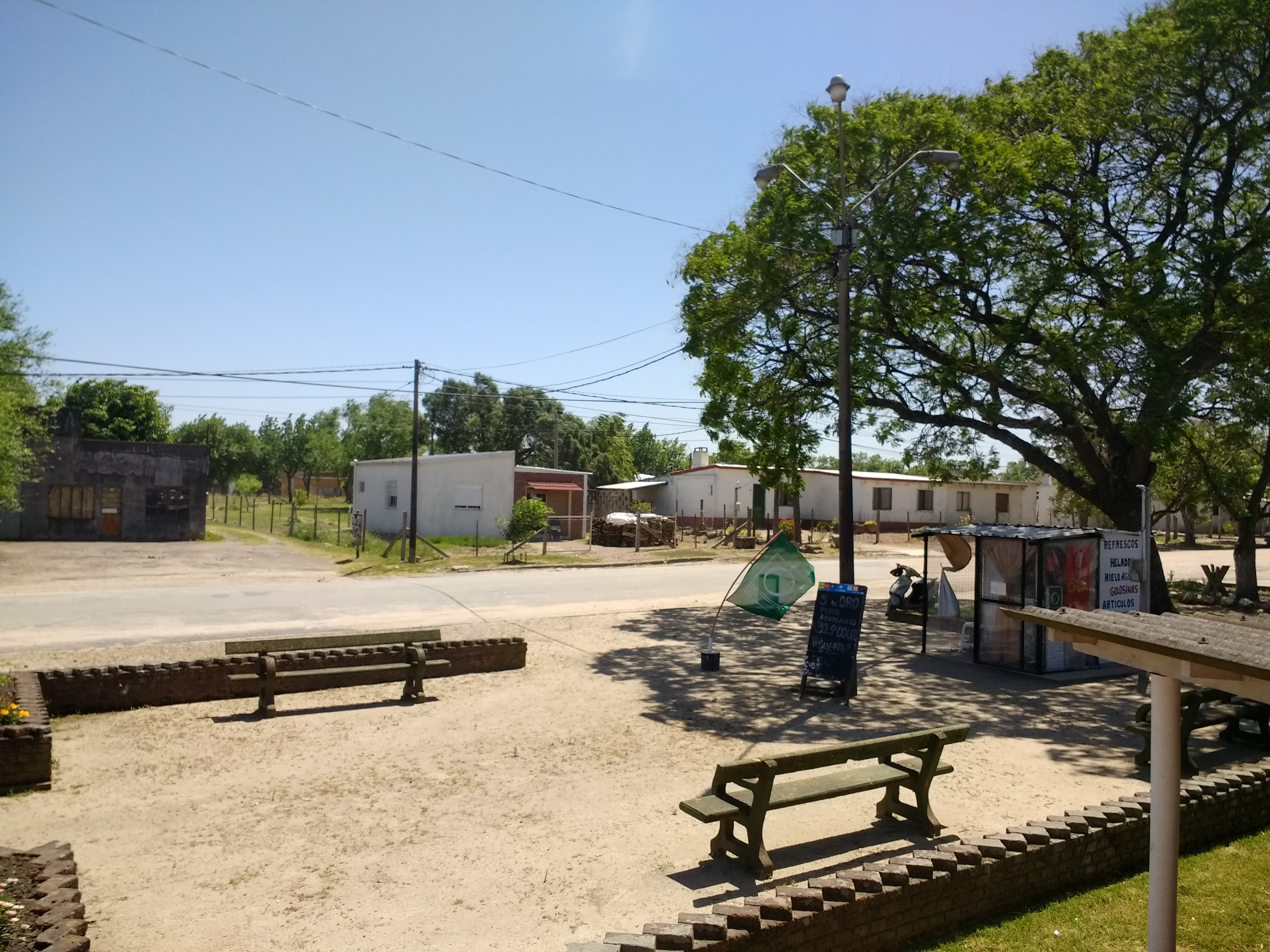

- Location in Uruguay
- Coordinates: 33°42′0″S 57°32′0″W
- Country: Uruguay
- Department: Soriano Department

Population (2011)
  - Total: 2,120
- Time zone: UTC -3
- Postal code: 75202
- Dial plan: +598 4538 (+4 digits)

José Enrique Rodó is a small town in the Soriano Department of western Uruguay.

== Geography ==
The town is located on Route 2, about 26 kilometres (16 mi) northwest of Cardona and 70 kilometres (43 mi) southeast of the city of Mercedes.

== History ==
By the late 19th century, there existed a precarious slum called Drovandi Town, after the family surname that owned the fields. The San José-Mercedes railway was inaugurated in 1901, and along with it, the Drabble Station, named after George Drabble, a British businessman who invested in railway development in Uruguay and Argentina. By the 30s essential services were inaugurated. Between 1963 and 1996 the population increased by 40%.

On 12 June 1924, the populated centre was declared a "Pueblo" (village) by the Act of Ley N° 7.729, and changed its name to José Enrique Rodó, an Uruguayan writer who died in 1917. Previously, it had been head of the judicial sections "San Martin" and "Costa Durazno". On 17 November 1964, its status was elevated to "Villa" (town) by the Act of Ley N° 13.299.

== Population ==
In 2011 José Enrique Rodó had a population of 2,120.

Year	Population
1908	3,113
1963	1,319
1975	1,788
1985	1,661
1996	1,853
2004	2,113
2011	2,120

Source: Instituto Nacional de Estadística de Uruguay

== Places of worship ==
- St. Joseph the Worker Parish Church (Roman Catholic)
