= Gonzalo Pérez Iribarren =

Uruguayan mathematician and statistical expert

Gonzalo Pérez Iribarren (1936–1998) was an Uruguayan mathematician and statistical expert.
