= Cardona, Uruguay =

Cardona
- City
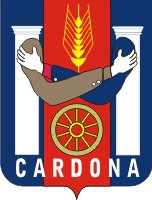
- Coat of arms

- Location within Uruguay
- Coordinates: 33°52′10″S 57°22′5″W
- Country: Uruguay
- Department: Soriano
- Municipality: Cardona
- Founded: 1903
- Elevation: 163 m (535 ft)

Population (2011 Census)
  - Total: 4,600
- Time zone: UTC -3
- Postal code: 75200
- Dial plan: + 598 4536 (+4 digits)

Cardona is a city in the Soriano Department, in southwestern Uruguay. The main square of the city is Plaza Artigas, featuring a monument to General Artigas.

== Geography ==
The city is located on the border with Colonia Department and it forms a unified population centre together with Florencio Sánchez, which is across the border and belongs to Colonia Department. Bulevard Cardona - Florencio Sanchez, which runs parallel to the railroad tracks, separates the two parts.

== History ==
Cardona was founded on 17 October 1903. On 18 April 1910, it was declared a "Pueblo" (village) by the Act of Ley Nº 3.607. At the time the area it was in was called "La Lata del Perdido" and the village had previously been the head of the judicial section of "Perdido". On 12 June 1953, its status was elevated to "Villa" (town) by the Act of Ley N° 11.946, and on 15 October 1963, it was further elevated to "Ciudad" (city) by the Act of Ley N° 13.167.

== Population ==
In 2011, Cardona had a population of 4,600.

Year	Population
1908	2,231
1963	4,110
1975	4,104
1985	3,822
1996	4,579
2004	4,689
2011	4,600

Source: Instituto Nacional de Estadística de Uruguay

== Places of worship ==
- Parish Church of Our Lady of Luján and St. Elizabeth (Roman Catholic)

== Government ==
The city mayor as of July 2010 is Raúl Bertinat.

== Twin towns ==
- Cardona, Catalonia
