= Dolores, Uruguay =

Dolores
- City
- Location in Uruguay
- Coordinates: 33°32′S 58°13′W
- Country: Uruguay
- Department: Soriano
- Municipality: Dolores
- Founded: 1801

Population (2011 Census)
  - Total: 17,174
- Time zone: UTC −3
- Postal code: 75100
- Dial plan: +598 4534 (+4 digits)

Dolores is a city in the Soriano Department of western Uruguay.

== Geography ==
The city is located in the west part of the Soriano's department, on the left banks of San Salvador River, about 20 kilometres (12 mi) before it discharges into the Uruguay River. It is almost entirely surrounded by the populated rural area known as Chacras de Dolores. It has a natural port and is connected with the rest of the country by Routes 21 and 96.

== History ==
It was founded in September 1801. It had acquired the status of "Villa" (town) before the Independence of Uruguay under the name "San Salvador". On 26 November 1923, its status was elevated to "Ciudad" (city) by the Act of Ley Nº 7.652.

=== 2016 tornado ===
On April 15, 2016, a major F3 tornado struck Dolores, killing four people and injuring more than 200 people.

Before that, one struck in 1985, and another in 2012, both of them intense.

== Population ==
In 2011, Dolores had a population of 17,174. Together with the surrounding rural inhabitants of Chacras de Dolores, they form a population centre of more than 19,000.

Year	Population
1901	3,170
1963	12,480
1975	13,322
1985	13,084
1996	14,784
2004	15,753
2011	17,174

Source: Instituto Nacional de Estadística de Uruguay

== Places of worship ==
- Our Lady of Sorrows Parish Church (Roman Catholic)
- Iglesia Evangelica de los Dolores (Protestant Church)
- LDS Wards (The Church of Jesus Christ of Latter-day Saints)
