= Soriano Department =

Department of Uruguay

Soriano
- Department
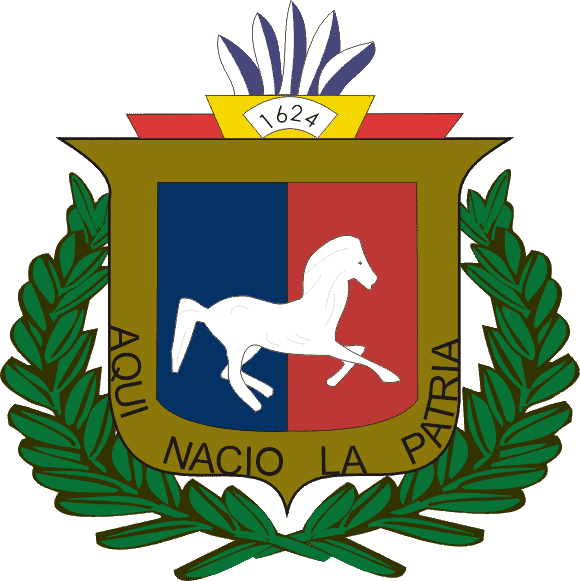
- Flag Coat of arms

- Location of Soriano Department in Uruguay
- Coordinates (Mercedes): 33°15′S 58°2′W
- Country: Uruguay
- Established: 1816
- Capital of Department: Mercedes

Government
  - Intendant: Guillermo Besozzi
  - Ruling party: Partido Nacional

Area
  - Total: 9,008 km^{2} (3,478 sq mi)
- Elevation: 71 m (233 ft)

Population (2023 census)
  - Total: 83,685
  - Density: 9.290/km^{2} (24.06/sq mi)
- Demonym: Sorianense
- Time zone: UTC-3 (UYT)
- ISO 3166 code: UY-SO
- Website: soriano.gub.uy

Soriano (Spanish pronunciation: [soˈɾjano]) is a department of Uruguay. Its capital is Mercedes. It is located on the west of the country, south of Río Negro Department, north of Colonia Department and west of Flores Department. Its western border is the Río Uruguay, separating it from Argentina.

== History ==
In 1624, a Franciscan Mission established a reduction for the indigenous tribes of the area named Santo Domingo Soriano. In spite of interruptions in its existence, it is considered the earliest populated centre of the actual Uruguay. Eventually, in its place Villa Soriano was founded.

The first division of Uruguay in departments happened on 27 January 1816. At the time, eight departments were formed, with Soriano being one of them. When the first constitution was signed in 1830, Soriano Department was one of the nine original departments of the Republic.

== Demographics ==
Ethnic groups in Soriano (2011 est.)
Ethnic groups	Percent
White	94.1%
Black	3.2%
Indigenous	4.0%
Asian	0.3%
None/Other/Unspecified	2.1%

As of the census of 2011, Soriano Department had a population of 82,592 (40.853 male and 41.742 female) and 32,075 households.

Demographic data for Soriano Department in 2010:

- Population growth rate: 0.558%
- Birth rate: 16.60 births/1,000 people
- Death rate: 9.41 deaths/1,000 people
- Average age: 31.7 (30.8 male, 32.6 female)
- Life expectancy at birth:
  - Total population: 76.32 years
  - Male: 73.47 years
  - Female: 79.26 years
- Average per household income: 25,198 pesos/month
- Urban per capita income: 9,648 pesos/month

2010 Data Source:

Main Urban Centres
Other towns and villages
Population stated as per 2011 census.

City / Town	Population
Mercedes	41,974
Dolores	17,174
Cardona	4,600
Palmitas	2,123
José Enrique Rodó	2,120
Chacras de Dolores	1,961
Villa Soriano	1,124

Town / Village	Population
Santa Catalina	998
Egaña	783
Risso	557
Villa Darwin (Sacachispas)	456
Cañada Nieto	430
Agraciada	394
Palmar	381

Rural population
According to the 2011 census, Soriano department has a rural population of 6,612.

== Map of the department ==
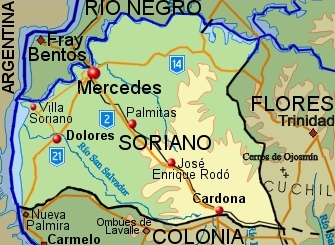
Topographic map of Soriano Department showing main populated places and roads

== Noted locality ==
- Agraciada Beach, a historically important location in Uruguay's past, associated with the Thirty-Three Orientals.

== Notable people ==
- Juan Idiarte Borda, from Soriano, was President of Uruguay from 1894 to 1897
- Tomás Gomensoro Albín, from Soriano, was President of Uruguay (interim) from 1872 to 1873
- Jesús Posse, rower
- Santiago Ostolaza, from Dolores, football player

== See also ==
- List of populated places in Uruguay#Soriano Department
