= Mercedes, Uruguay =

Mercedes La Hermosa del Sur
- Capital city
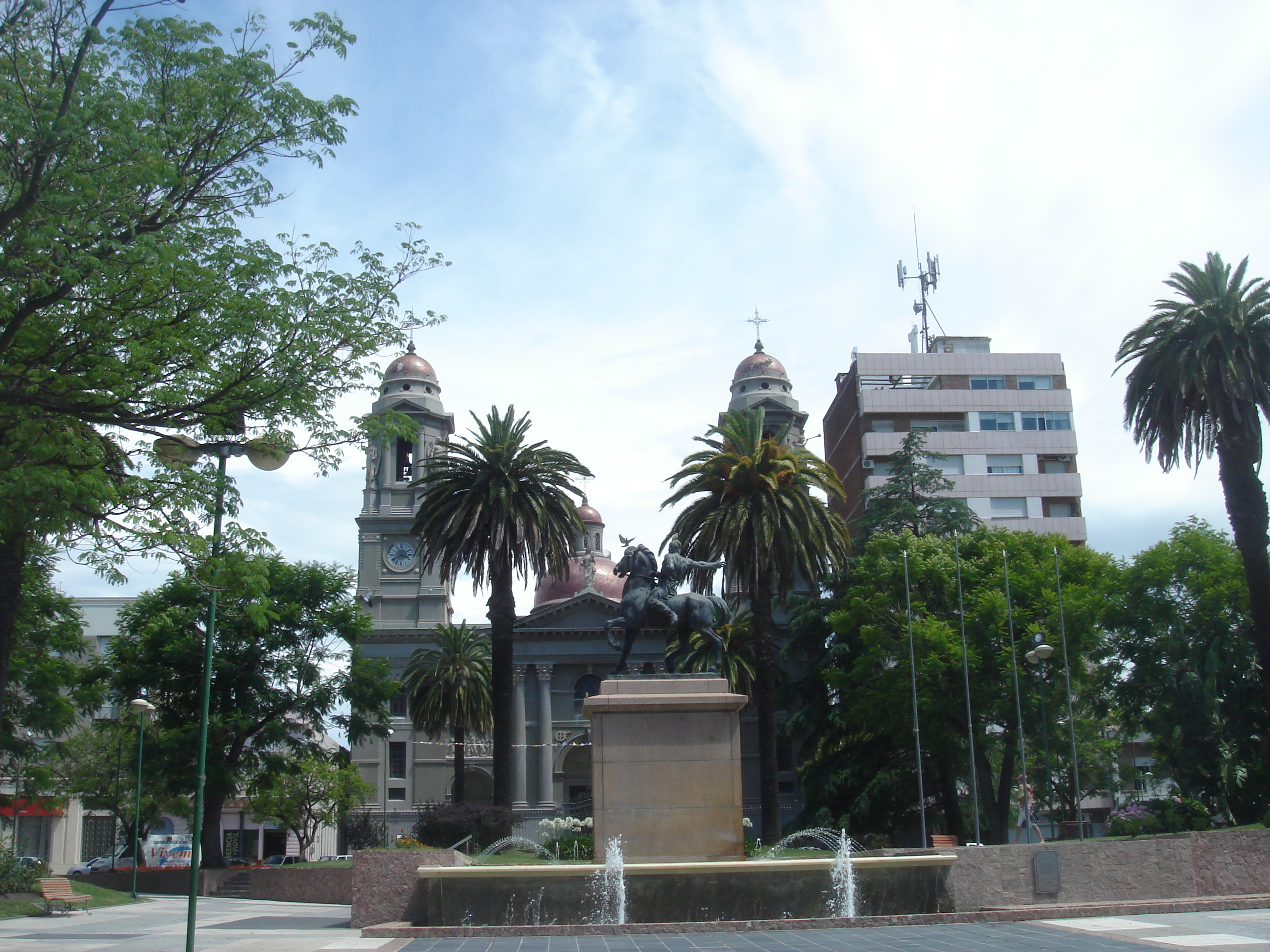
- Plaza Independencia

- Location in Uruguay
- Coordinates: 33°15′0″S 58°2′0″W
- Country: Uruguay
- Department: Soriano
- Founded: 1788

Area
  - Total: 24.6 km^{2} (9.5 sq mi)
- Elevation: 26 m (85 ft)

Population (2023 Census)
  - Total: 43,543
  - Density: 1,770/km^{2} (4,580/sq mi)
  - Demonym: mercedario-a
- Time zone: UTC -3
- Postal code: 75000
- Dial plan: +598 453 (+5 digits)
- Climate: Cfa

Mercedes (Spanish pronunciation: [meɾˈseðes]) is the capital and largest city of the department of Soriano in Uruguay. According to the census 2011, it is the tenth most populated city of the country.

Mercedes is an important centre of tourism, commerce and a commercial port. Its main industries are based on agriculture, dairy products, paper manufacturing and industrial activities. Its rambla (riverside promenade) is one of the widest in the country.

== History ==
Mercedes was founded in 1788 by the priest Manuel Antonio de Castro y Careaga with the name of Capilla Nueva de las Mercedes. It had acquired the status of "Villa" (town) before the Independence of Uruguay. On 6 July 1857, its status was elevated to "Ciudad" (city) and it was designated as capital of Soriano, one of the nine original departments of the Republic at the time, by the Act of Law Nº 531. Previously, the capital of the department was Villa Soriano.

== Population ==
In 2023, it had a population of about 43,543

Year	Population
1908	15,667
1963	31,325
1975	34,518
1985	36,701
1996	39,320
2004	42,032
2011	41,174
2023	43,543

Source: Instituto Nacional de Estadística de Uruguay

== Geography ==
The city is located on the junction of Route 2 with Route 14, and is situated on the south bank of the Río Negro. Also Route 21 from Colonia del Sacramento of Colonia Department terminates in this city.

=== Climate ===
Climate data for Mercedes, Uruguay (1991–2020, extremes 1941–2020)
Month	Jan	Feb	Mar	Apr	May	Jun	Jul	Aug	Sep	Oct	Nov	Dec	Year
Record high °C (°F)	42.8 (109.0)	41.6 (106.9)	40.0 (104.0)	36.0 (96.8)	32.2 (90.0)	30.2 (86.4)	30.5 (86.9)	33.3 (91.9)	36.1 (97.0)	36.6 (97.9)	39.7 (103.5)	42.0 (107.6)	42.8 (109.0)
Mean daily maximum °C (°F)	31.5 (88.7)	29.8 (85.6)	28.0 (82.4)	24.2 (75.6)	20.3 (68.5)	17.3 (63.1)	16.6 (61.9)	19.1 (66.4)	20.8 (69.4)	23.8 (74.8)	27.4 (81.3)	30.0 (86.0)	24.1 (75.4)
Daily mean °C (°F)	24.7 (76.5)	23.5 (74.3)	21.7 (71.1)	18.0 (64.4)	14.5 (58.1)	11.8 (53.2)	10.9 (51.6)	12.8 (55.0)	14.5 (58.1)	17.5 (63.5)	20.6 (69.1)	23.1 (73.6)	17.8 (64.0)
Mean daily minimum °C (°F)	17.9 (64.2)	17.2 (63.0)	15.3 (59.5)	11.7 (53.1)	8.7 (47.7)	6.1 (43.0)	5.3 (41.5)	6.5 (43.7)	8.2 (46.8)	11.2 (52.2)	13.7 (56.7)	16.2 (61.2)	11.5 (52.7)
Record low °C (°F)	5.0 (41.0)	5.3 (41.5)	2.2 (36.0)	−1.3 (29.7)	−4.5 (23.9)	−8.2 (17.2)	−7.6 (18.3)	−5.0 (23.0)	−5.6 (21.9)	−3.5 (25.7)	0.4 (32.7)	3.0 (37.4)	−8.2 (17.2)
Average precipitation mm (inches)	133.1 (5.24)	123.8 (4.87)	134.2 (5.28)	116.9 (4.60)	78.9 (3.11)	68.0 (2.68)	61.1 (2.41)	70.7 (2.78)	78.5 (3.09)	120.9 (4.76)	96.8 (3.81)	131.5 (5.18)	1,214.4 (47.81)
Average precipitation days (≥ 1.0 mm)	6	7	6	7	5	5	5	5	5	8	6	7	72
Average relative humidity (%)	64	69	72	76	78	80	77	74	72	72	68	63	72
Mean monthly sunshine hours	293.0	243.6	244.4	180.2	168.3	139.3	160.1	188.7	200.6	224.8	262.0	272.6	2,577.6
Source 1: Instituto Uruguayo de Metereología
Source 2: NOAA (precipitation and sun 1991–2020), Instituto Nacional de Investigación Agropecuaria (humidity 1980–2009)

== Places of worship ==
- Cathedral of Our Lady of Mercy (Roman Catholic)
- Sacred Heart of Jesus Parish Church (Roman Catholic)
- St. John the Baptist Parish Church (Roman Catholic, Sisters of the Divine Savior)
- St. Pius X Parish Church (Roman Catholic)

== Sports ==
Mercedes was one of the host cities of the official 1967 Basketball World Cup.

== Notable people ==
- Ricardo Paseyro (1925–2009), diplomat and poet
