= Colonia Department =

Department of Uruguay

Colonia
- Department
- Flag Coat of arms

- Location of Colonia Department in Uruguay
- Coordinates (Colonia del Sacramento): 34°28′17″S 57°50′39″W
- Country: Uruguay
- Established: 1816
- Capital of Department: Colonia del Sacramento

Government
  - Intendant: Guillermo A. Rodríguez
  - Ruling party: National

Area
  - Total: 6,106 km^{2} (2,358 sq mi)
- Elevation: 71 m (233 ft)

Population (2023 census)
  - Total: 135,717
  - Density: 22.23/km^{2} (57.57/sq mi)
- Demonym: colonienses
- Time zone: UTC-3 (UYT)
- ISO 3166 code: UY-CO
- Website: www.colonia.gub.uy

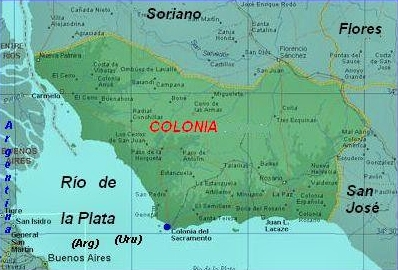
Map of Colonia Department

Colonia (Spanish pronunciation: [koˈlonja]) is a department of southwestern Uruguay. Its capital is Colonia del Sacramento, the country's second-oldest city.

== Geography ==
=== Climate ===
Colonia has an annual average temperature of 20.4 °C (68.7 °F). In winter it has an average temperature of 9 °C (48.2 °F) and in summer it has an average temperature of 27 °C (80.6 °F)

== Economy ==
The southwestern region of Uruguay, where Colonia Department is located, is traditionally associated with dairy production. The area contains production plants of several dairy companies, including the well-known Los Nietitos, Colonial, and La Positiva, as well as smaller producers.

The PepsiCo plant located in Colonia del Sacramento, is one of the three largest worldwide, employing more than 2,000 people and serving the entire Latin American import market. The plant operates under special economic zone legislation, and as of November 2019, has successfully approved an enlargement investment for $65 million.

Its proximity to Buenos Aires makes it the main entry point for tourists traveling from Argentina to Uruguay. Tourism is also favored by part of the capital being a World Heritage Site.

== Demographics ==
Ethnic groups in Colonia (2011 est.)
Ethnic groups	Percent
White	95.8%
Black	2.9%
Indigenous	2.5%
Asian	0.2%
None/Other/Unspecified	2.1%

As of the census of 2023, Colonia Department has a population of 135,797.

Main Urban Centres
Other towns and villages
Population stated as per 2011 census.

City / Town	Population
Colonia del Sacramento	29,231
Carmelo	18,041
Juan Lacaze	12,816
Nueva Helvecia	10,630
Rosario	10,085
Nueva Palmira	9,857
Tarariras	6,632
Florencio Sánchez	3,716
Ombúes de Lavalle	3,390
Colonia Valdense	3,235

Town / Village	Population
Miguelete	999
La Paz	603
El Semillero	600
Conchillas	401

Rural population

According to the 2011 census, Colonia department has an additional rural population of 11,471.

== See also ==
- List of populated places in Uruguay#Colonia Department
- Fomento, Uruguay
