= List of Italian religious minority politicians =

This is a list of Italian politicians belonging to a religious minority, different from the dominant Roman Catholicism.

To ensure notability, only leading politicians (ministers, deputies, senators, MEPs, regional councillors, mayors of big cities, party leaders, etc.) are included in the list. Active politicians and their current parties are shown in bold. The parties of which these people have been members are listed in chronological order.

Some of the politicians included in the list are lapsed, nominal or former believers, but all have retained their ethnic-religious background.

From 1861 to the first decades of the 20th century political parties were mostly loose parliamentary groups. "Right" refers both to the Historical Right (as linked, referred to also as Liberal Conservatives) of Camillo Benso di Cavour and Bettino Ricasoli and the Liberal Constitutional Party of Marco Minghetti and Sidney Sonnino. "Left" refers to the Historical Left (referred to also as Democrats) of Agostino Depretis and Francesco Crispi. "Lib" refers to the Liberals, later Liberal Union, which, under the leadership of Giovanni Giolitti and Giuseppe Zanardelli, emerged from the Historical Left and largely incorporated also elements of the Historical Right. "Far Left" refers to the Historical Far Left.

"Indep" indicates a politician unaffiliated to any party and acting as an Independent.

== Christians ==
=== Protestants ===
==== Waldensians ====
- Marco Bellion (PSI, FL, DS, PD)
- Giuseppe Bogoni (PSI)
- Tavo Burat (PSI, FdV)
- Lino De Benetti (FdV, DS, PD)
- **Carlo Calenda** (SC, Indep, PD, **Az**)
- **Paolo Ferrero** (DP, **PRC**)
- Giorgio Gardiol (DP, FdV)
- Matteo Gay (PSI)
- Riccardo Illy (Indep, PD)
- Luigi Lacquaniti (DC, PPI, DL, DS, SD, SEL, LeD, PD, Art.1, AP)
- Giuseppe Malan (Right)
- **Lucio Malan** (LN, FI, PdL, FI, **FdI**)
- Domenico Maselli (PSI, CS, DS, PD)
- **Massimo Mezzetti** (PCI, PDS, DS, SD, SEL, Art.1, **Indep**)
- Giovanni Morelli (Left)
- Rosario Olivo (PSI, FL, DS, PD)
- Giorgio Peyrot (PSI)
- Giulio Peyrot (PSI)
- Enrico Soulier (Lib)
- **Niccolò Rinaldi** (PRI, IdV, Rete2018, PRI, **MRE**)
- Valdo Spini (PSI, FL, DS, SD, PSI)
- Tullio Vinay (PCI)

==== Pentecostals ====
- Mercedes Lourdes Frias (PRC, SEL)
- Antonino Moscato (PACE)
- Sandro Oliveri (PACE, MpA)
- Gilberto Perri (PACE)
- **Massimo Ripepi** (PACE, FI, **FdI**)

==== Methodists ====
- Dante Argentieri (PSI)
- Gianni De Michelis (PSI, PS, NPSI, PSI)
- Pellegrino Strobel (Far Left)

==== Anglicans ====
- Giorgio Sonnino (Right)
- Sidney Sonnino (Right)

==== Baptists ====
- **Raffaele Bruno** (**M5S**)

==== Lutherans ====
- **Furio Honsell** (PD, Art.1, **Indep**)

==== Brethren ====
- Bonaventura Mazzarella (Left)

=== Eastern Catholics ===
==== Italo-Albanian Catholics ====
- Nicola Barbato (FS, PSI)
- Giuseppe Salvatore Bellusci (PRI)
- Mario Brunetti (PSI, PSIUP, PdUP, DP, PCI, PRC)
- Francesco Crispi (Left)
- Francesco Di Martino (PSI, SI, SDI)
- Cesare Marini (PSI, SI, SDI, PD)
- Salvatore Mazzaracchio (FI, PdL)
- Giovanni Mosciaro (Left)
- Rosolino Petrotta (DC)
- Stefano Rodotà (PCI, PDS, DS, PD)
- Donato Scutari (PCI)

=== Eastern Orthodox ===
==== Romanian Orthodox ====
- Nona Evghenie (DS, PD)

==== Italian Orthodox ====
- Alessandro Meluzzi (PCI, PR, PSI, FI, UDR, RI, FdV, UDEur)

=== Oriental Orthodox ===
==== Coptic Orthodox ====
- Giorgio Sorial (M5S)

=== Non-denominational ===
- Magdi Allam (IAI, FdI)
- Bettino Craxi (PSI)
- Giuseppe Garibaldi (GI, PdA, Left, Far Left)
- Luciano Violante (PCI, PDS, DS, PD)

== Jews ==
- Paolo Alatri (PdA, PCI)
- Ugo Ancona (PNF)
- Edoardo Arbib (Right)
- Gino Arias (PSI, PNF)
- Eugenio Artom (PLI)
- Ernesto Artom (Right)
- Isacco Artom (Right)
- Graziadio Isaia Ascoli (Indep)
- Angelica Balabanoff (PSI, PSDI)
- Luca Barbareschi (PSI, AN, PdL, FLI, Indep)
- Salvatore Barzilai (PRI)
- Giovanni Cantoni (Left)
- Dario Cassuto (Lib)
- Furio Colombo (PDS, DS, PD)
- Luigi Cremona (Right)
- Sansone D'Ancona (Right)
- Ugo Da Como (Lib)
- Franco Debenedetti (DS)
- Gustavo Del Vecchio (Indep)
- Roberto Della Seta (PD)
- Ugo Della Seta (PRI, PSI)
- Luigi Della Torre (PDSI)
- Susy De Martini (LD, PdL, LD, FI)
- Adriano Diena (Lib)
- Pio Donati (PSI, PSU)
- Federico Enriques (DS, PD)
- Giuliano Ferrara (PCI, PSI, FI)
- Maurizio Ferrara (PCI)
- **Emanuele Fiano** (PDS, DS, **PD**)
- Aldo Finzi (PNF)
- Giuseppe Finzi (Left)
- Pio Foà (Lib)
- Vittorio Foa (PdA, PSI, PSIUP, PdUP, DP, PCI, PDS, DS, PD)
- Alessandro Fortis (Left)
- Leopoldo Franchetti (Right, Lib)
- Lazzaro Frizzi (Right)
- Augusto Graziani (PDS)
- Roberto Gremmo (UP+UA, LAL)
- Yoram Gutgeld (PD)
- Luciano Jona (PLI)
- Guido Jung (PNF, Indep)
- Anna Kuliscioff (PSI, PSU)
- Giancarlo Lehner (PSI, PdL)
- Gad Lerner (LC, DL, PD)
- Giorgina Levi (PCI)
- Isaia Levi (PNF)
- Ricardo Franco Levi (PD)
- Ulderico Levi (Right)
- Giacomo Levi Civita (Right)
- Rita Levi-Montalcini (Indep)
- Lionello Levi Sandri (PSI)
- Alessandro Litta Modignani (PR, LP, Rad)
- Luigi Luzzatti (Right, Lib)
- Riccardo Luzzatto (Rad)
- Miriam Mafai (PCI, PDS)
- Giacomo Malvano (Indep)
- Tullo Massarani (Left)
- Edmondo Mayor des Planches (Indep)
- **Ester Mieli** (**FdI**)
- Giorgio Myallonnier (PR, LP, Rad)
- Enrico Modigliani (PRI)
- Giuseppe Emanuele Modigliani (PSI, PSDI)
- Riccardo Momigliano (PSI, PSDI)
- Mario Montagnana (PSI, PCI)
- Rita Montagnana (PSI, PCI)
- Claudio Morpurgo (PdL)
- Elio Morpurgo (Left, Lib)
- Lodovico Mortara (Indep)
- Elia Musatti (PSI)
- Ernesto Nathan (Rad)
- Fiamma Nirenstein (PCI, PRI, PSI, PdL)
- Gino Olivetti (Lib)
- Girolamo Orefici (Lib)
- Silvio Ortona (PCI)
- Giuseppe Ottolenghi (Right)
- Salvatore Ottolenghi (Right)
- Moni Ovadia (AET)
- Cesare Parenzo (Left)
- Isacco Pesaro Maurogonato (Right)
- Yasha Reibman (LP, Rad)
- Angelo Pavia (Left, Lib)
- Bellom Pescarolo (Indep)
- Ugo Pisa (Lib)
- Vittorio Polacco (Indep)
- Renzo Ravenna (PNF)
- Alfredo Reichlin (PCI, PDS, DS, PD)
- Leone Romanin Jacur (Indep)
- Carlo Rosselli (GL)
- Nello Rosselli (GL)
- Alessandro Ruben (PdL, FLI)
- **Elly Schlein** (PD, P, Indep, **PD**)
- **Liliana Segre** (**Indep**)
- Sergio Segre (PCI)
- Salvatore Segrè Sartorio (PNF)
- Enzo Sereni (PCI)
- Lorenzo Strik Lievers (PR, LP, Rad)
- Riccardo Sarfatti (PD)
- Umberto Terracini (PSI, PCI)
- Claudio Treves (Rad, PSI, PSU, PSI)
- Paolo Treves (PSI, PSDI)
- Alberto Treves de Bonfili (Right, Lib)
- Maurizio Valenzi (PCI)
- Leo Valiani (PCI, PdA, PR, PRI)
- Vito Volterra (Lib)
- Leone Wollemborg (Lib)
- Bruno Zevi (PdA, UP, PSI, PR)
- Tullia Zevi (PSI, PD)

== Muslims ==
- Sumaya Abdel Qader (PD)
- Khaled Fouad Allam (FdV, DL, PD)
- Pietrangelo Buttafuoco (MSI, AN)
- Khalid Chaouki (DS, PD)
- **Moreno Marsetti** (LN, **Lega**)
- Alì Rashid (PRC)
- **Souad Sbai** (PdL, FLI, PdL, NcS, **Lega**)
- Mahmoud Srour (PPI, UDEur, PD)
- Dacia Valent (PCI, PRC, AN, IdV)

== Buddhists ==
- Renato Accorinti (PR, Indep)
- Carla Gravina (PCI)

== See also ==
- Politics of Italy
- Religion in Italy
- Christianity in Italy
- Islam in Italy
- History of the Jews in Italy
- Buddhism in Italy
