= Gonzaga Institute, Palermo =

- Italian: Gonzaga Campus

Location
- Via Piersanti Mattarella, 38; Palermo, Sicily; Italy
- 38°7′54″N 13°20′49″E

Information
- Type: Private primary and secondary school
- Religious affiliation: Catholicism
- Denomination: Jesuits
- Established: 1919; 107 years ago
- Grades: Pre-school; K-13
- Gender: Coeducational
- Age range: 18 months to 18 years
- Website: gonzagacampus.it

Gonzaga Institute, Palermo (now known as Gonzaga Campus), is a private Catholic primary and secondary school located in Palermo, Sicily, Italy. Founded by the Society of Jesus in 1919, the campus provides education for students from 18 months to 18 years, including an Italian curriculum and a certified International School.

== History ==
Istituto Gonzaga was founded by the Society of Jesus in 1919. In 1996, it underwent a major reorganization by merging with the neighboring female institute, the Ancelle del Sacro Cuore (Handmaids of the Sacred Heart). This partnership created the Centro Educativo Ignaziano (CEI), which served as a unified coeducational project for nearly two decades.

In 2016, the collaboration concluded as the Ancelle del Sacro Cuore withdrew from the association. The school subsequently reverted to the exclusive management of the Jesuits and was rebranded as Gonzaga Campus. This transition involved a complete overhaul of the school's governance to align with the national Jesuit educational network, the Fondazione Gesuiti Educazione.

== Overview ==
The Gonzaga Campus is a member of the Fondazione Gesuiti Educazione, the network coordinating Jesuit schools across Italy and Albania. The institution operates as a multifunctional educational hub in Palermo, offering several distinct academic pathways from early childhood to university preparation:

- Italian School: Provides traditional Italian educational cycles including the Primary education in Italy (Scuola Primaria), Lower secondary education in Italy (Scuola Secondaria di Primo Grado), and high school specializations in Liceo Classico and Liceo Scientifico.
- International School Palermo (ISP): Founded in 2008, it is the only school in the region to offer the full International Baccalaureate (IB) continuum, including the Primary Years, Middle Years, and Diploma Programme. The IB Diploma is recognized by the Italian Ministry of Education as equivalent to the national high school diploma for university admission.
- STEM and Innovation: Building on a program introduced in 2017 in collaboration with research centers, the school has integrated STEM curricula to enhance scientific education through hands-on laboratory work.
- Polisportiva Gonzaga: The campus includes extensive sports facilities, including a swimming pool, gymnasium, and courts for tennis, football, and gymnastics, serving both students and the local community.

The campus emphasizes an "open and plural" educational model, integrating social justice initiatives and ecological awareness into its pedagogical framework.

== Notable alumni ==
Over its century-long history, the Gonzaga Campus has educated prominent figures in Italian politics, law, science and culture, many of whom are active in the school's official Alumni Association.

- Gaetano Armao, Jurist and former Vice-President of the Sicilian Region.
- Renzo Barbera, Businessman and historic president of Palermo FC, the city's main football club.
- Paolo Giaccone, Professor of forensic medicine and Mafia victim who refused to falsify a fingerprint report for the Corleonesi.
- Roberto Lagalla, Current Mayor of Palermo and former Rector of the University of Palermo.
- Enrico La Loggia, Politician, lawyer, and academic who served as Italian Minister for Regional Affairs (2001–2006).
- Raimondo Lanza di Trabia, Nobleman, diplomat, and sportsman who served as chairman of Palermo FC; he is famously credited with inventing the modern Italian football transfer market (calciomercato).
- Piersanti Mattarella, Former President of the Sicilian Region and brother of Italian President Sergio Mattarella; he was a victim of the Sicilian Mafia.
- Francesco Musotto, Politician and lawyer who served as the President of the Province of Palermo (1994–1995, 1998–2008) and as a Member of the European Parliament.
- Leoluca Orlando, Long-serving Mayor of Palermo and key figure in the "Sicilian Spring" anti-Mafia movement.
- Sandro Paternostro, Renowned journalist and long-time foreign correspondent for RAI.
- Giuseppe Provenzano, Academic and politician who served as the President of Sicily (1996–1998) and as a regional minister for health.
- Flavia Sparacino, Scientist and inventor; an innovator in augmented reality, wearable computing, and gesture-control technology at the MIT Media Lab.
- Fabio Triolo, Italian-American biomedical scientist and professor known for his work in regenerative medicine, cellular therapies, and tissue engineering, including his role in the first clinical implantation of a bioengineered esophagus in a human patient.

== See also ==
- Education in Italy
- List of schools in Italy
- List of Jesuit schools
