= Flavia =

Flavia (Latin for "blonde") may refer to:

== Places ==
- Flavia Caesariensis, a 4th-century Roman province in the Diocese of the Britains
- Flaviac, a commune in southern France

== People ==
- Flavia (gens), the Roman clan and imperial dynasty
- Flavia (name), a modern female personal name of Latin origin, most common in Italian and other Romance languages
- Flavia Agnes, an Indian activist and lawyer
- Flavia Cacace, a professional dancer
- Flavia Company, an Argentine novelist
- Flavia Fortunato, an Italian pop singer and television presenter
- Flavia Ottaviani, an Italian figure skater
- Flavia Pennetta, an Italian tennis player
- Flavia Sparacino, an American space maker and scientist
- Flavia Tumusiime, a Ugandan actress and radio and television host

== Art, entertainment, and media ==
=== Fictional entities ===
- Chancellor Flavia, a character in the Doctor Who mythos
- Princess Flavia, a character in the 1894 Anthony Hope novel The Prisoner of Zenda
- Flavia de Luce, a character in the mystery novel The Sweetness at the Bottom of the Pie
- Flavia Petrelli, a soprano who plays major roles in Donna Leon's Commissario Brunetti novels Death at La Fenice (1992), Acqua Alta (1996), and Falling in Love (2015)
- Flavia Mills, a character played by Margaret O'Brien in 1944's Tenth Avenue Angel
- Flavia Alba, a character in a series of mystery novels by Lindsey Davis, set in ancient Rome
- Flavia, a character in a French novel series Oceania by Helene Montardre
- Flavia Gemina, a character in a historical novel The Twelve Tasks of Flavia Gemina from the series The Roman Mysteries
- Flavia, a character in the video game Fire Emblem Awakening
- Flavia, a character and visual skin in the game Fortnite
- Flavia, an Italian-American painter and woodcut artist in NYC

=== Works ===
- Flavia the Heretic, a 1974 film
- Princess Flavia, a musical adaptation of The Prisoner of Zenda
- Flavia (film), a family adventure

== Other uses ==
- Flavia Beverage Systems, a division of Mars that manufactures hot drinks
- Lancia Flavia, an Italian automobile
- SS Flavia, an Italian ocean liner

== See also ==
- Flavio, a masculine form of the name
- Flavius, a masculine form of the name
