= Orthodoxy in Italy =

Orthodoxy in Italy may refer to:

- Eastern Orthodoxy in Italy, referring to Eastern Orthodox churches and communities in Italy
- Oriental Orthodoxy in Italy, referring to Oriental Orthodox churches and communities in Italy
- in general, any religious, political, artistic etc. orthodoxy in Italy

== See also ==
- Orthodoxy (disambiguation)
- Eastern Orthodoxy
- Oriental Orthodoxy
