= Christianity in Italy =

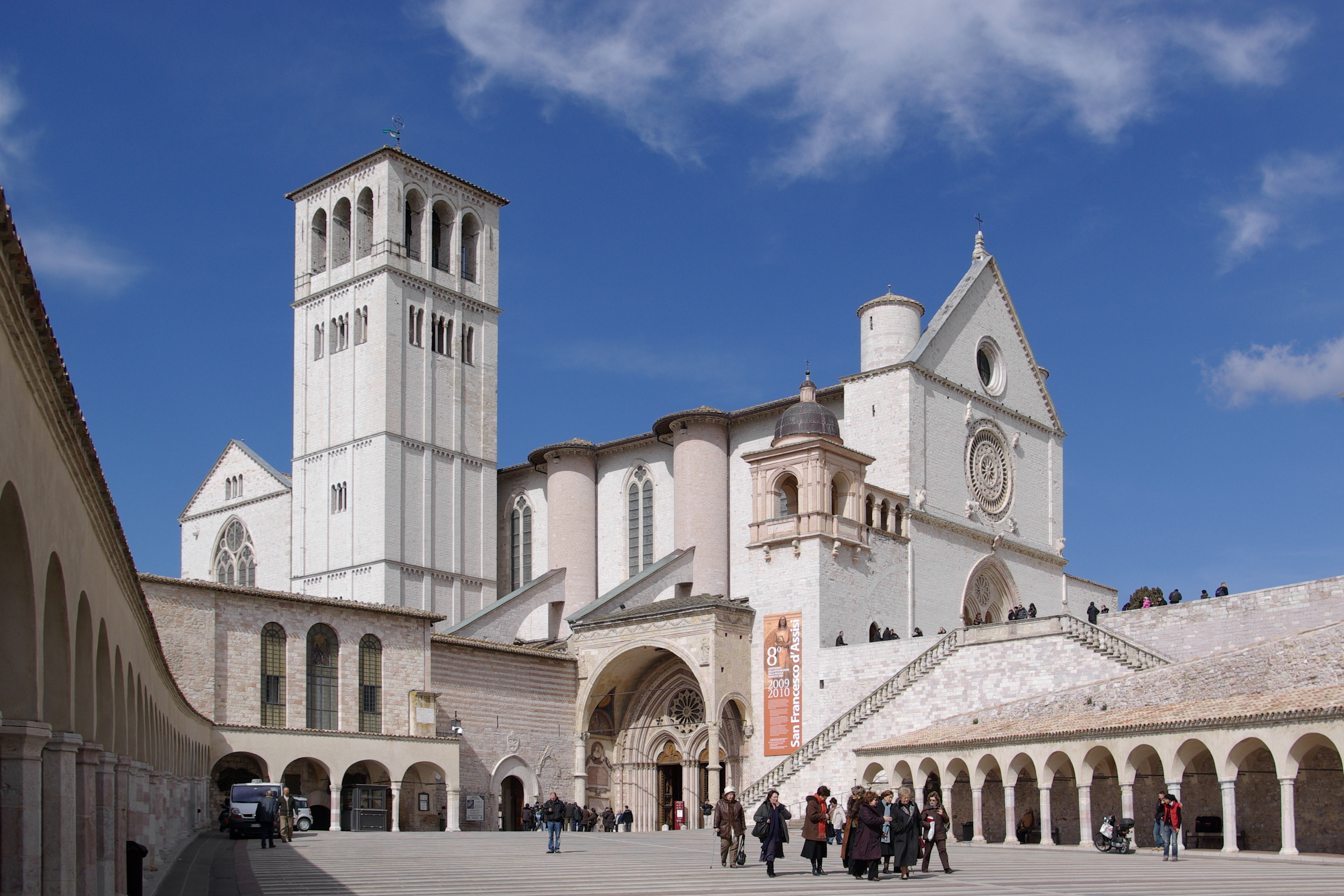
Catholic Basilica of Saint Francis in Assisi. Saint Francis is one of the patron saints of Italy.

Christianity in Italy has been historically characterised by the dominance of the Catholic Church since the East–West Schism. However, the country is also home to significant Christian minorities, especially Orthodox Christians, Protestants and Jehovah's Witnesses.

The country's patron saints are Francis of Assisi and Catherine of Siena.

== Overview ==
According to a 2023 survey by Ipsos (a France-based research centre) of 1,000 participants aged 18 to 75, 68% of the country's residents adhered to Christianity, including 61% Catholics, 4% Protestants and 3% other Christians, 28% were irreligious, 2% preferred not to say, 1% were Muslims and 1% adhered to other religions.

Regarding Italian citizens in Italy, according to the 2005 Eurobarometer poll (conducted on behalf of the European Commission), 85.6% of Italy's population was Christian (78.9% Catholics, 4.6% Orthodox Christians, 0.6% Protestants, 1.5% other Christians), while 2.6% belonged to other religions and 11.7% were non-religious (7.5% atheists, 4.2% agnostics). The 2021 Eurobarometer estimated that 84.4% was Christian (with 79.2% of the population being Catholic), 11.6% was agnostic or atheist and 3.2% followed another religion.

== The Catholic Church ==
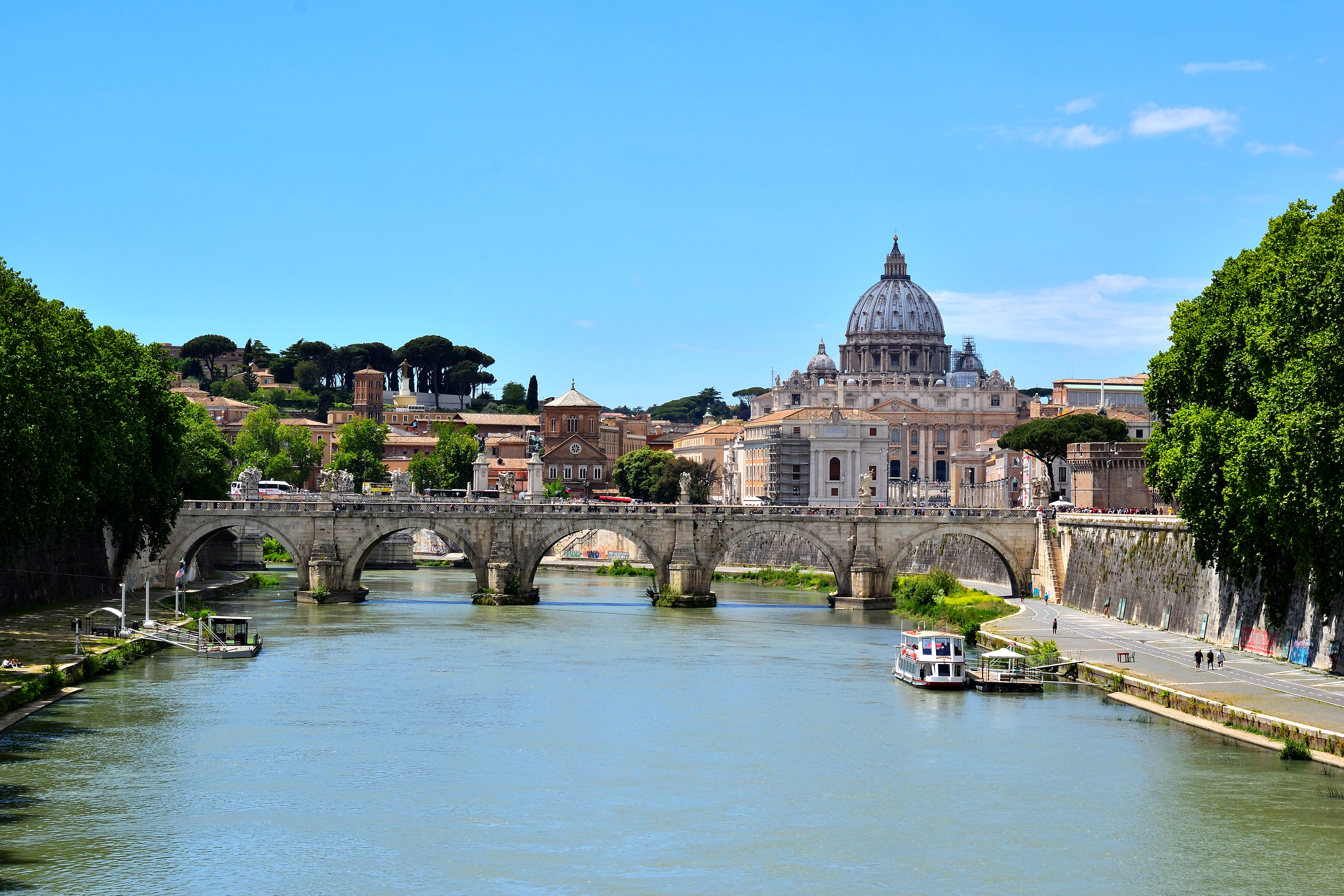
St. Peter's Basilica, viewed from the Tiber, the Vatican Hill in the back and Castel Sant'Angelo to the right, Rome (both the basilica and the hill are part of the sovereign state of Vatican City, the Holy See of the Catholic Church).

Before the unification of Italy, a large part of the Italian peninsula was part of the Papal States. After the unification in 1860, due to French aid, the Pope maintained control over Rome and Lazio. This ended on 20 September 1870, shortly after the defeat of Napoleon III. The Kingdom of Italy moved its capital to Rome and the Catholic Church lost any remaining temporal power.

The defeat of the Pope by the Kingdom of Italy gave rise to a long period of antagonism between ecclesiastical and Italian powers. This resulted in the Catholic Church suggesting its believers not to take part in the affairs of the country and the consequent secularisation of Italian politics. The Kingdom of Italy and the Catholic Church managed to reapproach under Fascist Italy with the stipulation of the Lateran Treaty. Among other things, the treaty allowed for the foundation of the Vatican City, a microstate over which the Holy See has full jurisdiction. The Lateran Treaty survived the fall of Fascism and the establishment of the Republic and was significantly amended in 1984.

For these historical and geographical reasons, many popes were born in pre-unitary Italian states or in the Kingdom of Italy. Pope Francis from Argentina was the third non-Italian Pope in a row, after John Paul II (1978–2005) from Poland and Benedict XVI (2005–2013) from Bavaria, Germany. Most of the leading Catholic religious orders, including the Franciscans (including the Order of Friars Minor, the Order of Friars Minor Capuchin and the Order of Friars Minor Conventual), the Salesians, the Jesuits, the Benedictines, the Divine Word Missionaries, the Dominicans, the Redemptorists, the Discalced Carmelites and the Oblates of Mary Immaculate, have their headquarters in Rome too.

The Italian territory is divided into 225 Catholic dioceses (whose bishops have been organised, since 1952, in the politically influential Episcopal Conference of Italy, CEI), currently led by Cardinal Matteo Zuppi. According to Church statistics (which do not consider current active members), 57,665,000 Italians, that is 96.6% of the country's population, was baptised as Catholic. Ecclesial life is somewhat vibrant and, despite secularization, some of the most active movements and associations are Catholic, including organisations as diverse as Catholic Action (AC), the Italian Catholic Association of Guides and Scouts (AGESCI), Communion and Liberation (CL), Neocatechumenal Way, the Focolare Movement, the Christian Associations of Italian Workers (ACLI), the Community of Sant'Egidio, etc., most of which have been involved in social activities and have frequently supplied Italian politics with their members. From 1945 to 1994 Italian politics was dominated by Christian Democracy, a Catholic-inspired but formally non-denominational party, which provided most of Italian Presidents and all Italian Prime Ministers but two in that period of time. Italy's current President, Sergio Mattarella, a former Christian Democrat, and former Prime Minister Matteo Renzi have been AC and AGESCI leaders, respectively, while a former President of the CEI, Cardinal Angelo Bagnasco, was long an AGESCI assistant.

== Other Christian denominations ==
Other than that the Latin Church of the Catholic Church, Italy has two additional significant Christian bodies that are native to the peninsula: the Italo-Albanian Catholic Church, one of the twenty-three Eastern Catholic Churches in communion with the Pope, and the Waldensian Evangelical Church, a Christian movement originated from Lyon in the late 12th century and adopted Calvinist theology shortly after the start of the Reformation (see also Waldensians). The two churches include the majority of the population in Piana degli Albanesi, Sicily and Lungro, Calabria, and the so-called "Waldensian Valleys" (Val Pellice, Val Chisone and Valle Germanasca) of western Piedmont, respectively.

Most historical mainline Protestants, including the Waldensians (30,000 members), the Baptists (Baptist Evangelical Christian Union of Italy, 15,000), the mostly German-speaking Lutherans (Evangelical Lutheran Church in Italy, 7,000), the Methodists (Methodist Evangelical Church in Italy, 5,000) and minor Calvinist and Presbyterian communities, are affiliated to the Federation of Evangelical Churches in Italy, along with the Italian section of The Salvation Army (2,000) and some minor Evangelical and Pentecostal denominations. In the Protestant context, it is also worth mentioning the Evangelical Christian Church of the Brethren (19,000) and the Italian section of the Seventh-day Adventist Church (18,000).

Immigration has reinforced Christian minorities, especially Eastern Orthodoxy and Oriental Orthodoxy. By the numbers, in 2023 the country was home to virtually 1.8 million Orthodox Christians. Among the latter, especially relevant are the Romanian Orthodox Church, which has a diocese of Italy, and the Greek Orthodox Church through the Ecumenical Patriarchate of Constantinople, whose Archdiocese of Italy and Exarchate of Southern Europe has its see in Venice. Massimo Introvigne, founder and director of CESNUR (a non-profit organisation focused on studying religious pluralism) once predicted that, thanks to continued immigration from Eastern Europe, Orthodox Christians could soon become the country's second largest religious group, overtaking Muslims.

Also Protestantism, especially in its Evangelical and Pentecostal forms, is on the rise: Introvigne recalls how Giorgio Bouchard, a Waldensian pastor, told him that "when he was born, the typical Italian Protestant was a man, lived in Piedmont, had a last name like Bouchard and was a Waldensian", while "today, the typical Italian Protestant believer is a woman, lives in Campania or Sicily, is named Esposito and is a Pentecostal." Not surprisingly the Assemblies of God in Italy (150,000 members), the Federation of Pentecostal Churches (50,000) and several smaller Evangelical/Pentecostal denominations have the majority of their communities in the South. Additionally, several foreign-born churches, especially African Pentecostal and African-initiated churches, mostly Evangelical and/or Pentecostal, are taking roots in the country, especially in the North, where most foreign residents live.

Among the fastest-growing new religious denominations in Italy a special place is held by the Jehovah's Witnesses, who count around 420,000 faithful, including both members and other people regularly attending the Congregation's meetings. For their part, Mormons are now 28,500, especially thanks to the activity of missionaries from the United States. According to Caritas Italiana (the CEI's charitable arm), in 2023 the immigrant population was 48.2% Christian, of which 26.8% Orthodox, 16.5% Catholic, 4.3% Protestant and 0.7% other. According to the same source, in 2012 Italy was home to 850 "African Neo-Pentecostal churches", 750 foreign-language Catholic communities and 355 Orthodox parishes.

== See also ==
- Catholic Church in Italy
- Eastern Orthodoxy in Italy
- Oriental Orthodoxy in Italy
- Protestantism in Italy
- Federation of Evangelical Churches in Italy
- List of Italian religious minority politicians
