= The Olive Tree (Italy) =

The Olive Tree L'Ulivo
- Leader: Romano Prodi (first and last)
- Founded: 6 March 1995
- Dissolved: 14 October 2007
- Merged into: Democratic Party
- Headquarters: via S. Andrea delle Fratte, 16; 00186 Rome
- Political position: Centre-left
- National affiliation: Ulivo–PRC (1996–98); The Union (2005–07)
- Colours: Green (official); Red (customary)

Website
- www.ulivo.it

The Olive Tree (Italian: L'Ulivo) was a denomination used for several successive centre-left political and electoral alliances of Italian political parties from 1995 to 2007.

The historical leader and ideologue of these coalitions was Romano Prodi, Professor of Economics and former leftist Christian Democrat, who invented the name and the symbol of The Olive Tree with Arturo Parisi in 1995. For the 2006 general election The Olive Tree was largely supplanted by a wider Prodi-led alliance called The Union, while The Olive Tree remained a smaller federation of parties which merged to form the Democratic Party in October 2007, which continues to be the lead party of an unnamed centre-left coalition.

== History ==
=== The Olive Tree coalition ===
==== In government with Prodi (1996–1998) ====
On 21 April 1996, The Olive Tree won 1996 general election in alliance with the Communist Refoundation Party (PRC), making Romano Prodi the Prime Minister of Italy. It was the first time since 1946 that the Communists, now gathered in the Democratic Party of the Left, took part in the government of the country and one of their leaders, Walter Veltroni, who ran in ticket with Prodi in a long electoral campaign, was Deputy Prime Minister.

In 1996 the coalition was formed by the following parties:

Party	Ideology	Leader
Democratic Party of the Left (PDS)	Democratic socialism	Massimo D'Alema
Italian People's Party (PPI)	Christian democracy	Franco Marini
Italian Renewal (RI)	Liberalism	Lamberto Dini
Federation of the Greens (FdV)	Green politics	Carlo Ripa di Meana
Labour Federation (FL)	Social democracy	Valdo Spini
Italian Socialists (SI)	Social democracy	Enrico Boselli
Democratic Union (UD)	Social liberalism	Antonio Maccanico
Segni Pact (Patto)	Centrism	Mariotto Segni
The Network (Rete)	Anti-Mafia politics	Leoluca Orlando
South Tyrolean People's Party (SVP)	Regionalism	Luis Durnwalder
Italian Republican Party (PRI)	Social liberalism	Giorgio La Malfa

Besides the external support of PRC, the coalition received the support also of some minor parties: the Italian Republican Party (PRI, social-liberal), The Network (social-liberal), the South Tyrolean People's Party (regionalist) and some other minor parties which later merged with PDS.

==== From D'Alema to Rutelli (1998–2004) ====
On 9 October 1998, the Prodi I Cabinet fell when PRC left the alliance. Since 21 October 1998 The Olive Tree was the core of the governments led by Massimo D'Alema (I and II Cabinet, 1998–2000) and by Giuliano Amato (II Cabinet, 2000–2001). When D'Alema became Prime Minister, it was the first time ever in Italy and in Europe that an heir of the communist tradition came to lead a government.

On 13 May 2001, led by Francesco Rutelli, who ran in ticket with Piero Fassino, the coalition lost the general elections against Silvio Berlusconi and his House of Freedoms centre-right coalition. In the 2001 general election, the coalition was composed of six parties:

Party	Ideology	Leader
Democrats of the Left (DS)	Social democracy	Piero Fassino
Democracy is Freedom – The Daisy (DL)	Centrism	Francesco Rutelli
Party of Italian Communists (PdCI)	Communism	Oliviero Diliberto
Italian Democratic Socialists (SDI)	Social democracy	Enrico Boselli
Federation of the Greens (FdV)	Green politics	Alfonso Pecoraro Scanio
Union of Democrats for Europe (UDEUR)	Christian democracy	Clemente Mastella

=== The Olive Tree list and federation ===
On 12 June 2004, The Olive Tree, as United in the Olive Tree (Uniti nell'Ulivo), ran in the European Parliament election gaining 31.1% of popular votes. The Olive Tree of 2004 was a tighter alliance of only four parties:

Party	Ideology	Leader
Democrats of the Left (DS)	Social democracy	Piero Fassino
Democracy is Freedom – The Daisy (DL)	Centrism	Francesco Rutelli
Italian Democratic Socialists (SDI)	Social democracy	Enrico Boselli
European Republican Movement (MRE)	Social liberalism	Luciana Sbarbati

On 13 September 2004, The Olive Tree was transformed in the Federation of The Olive Tree, consisting of same four parties that campaigned together in the European elections that summer. Romano Prodi, who came back to politics in that year, after five years of President of the European Commission, was elected President of the federation, which was to become the core of a larger centre-left coalition.

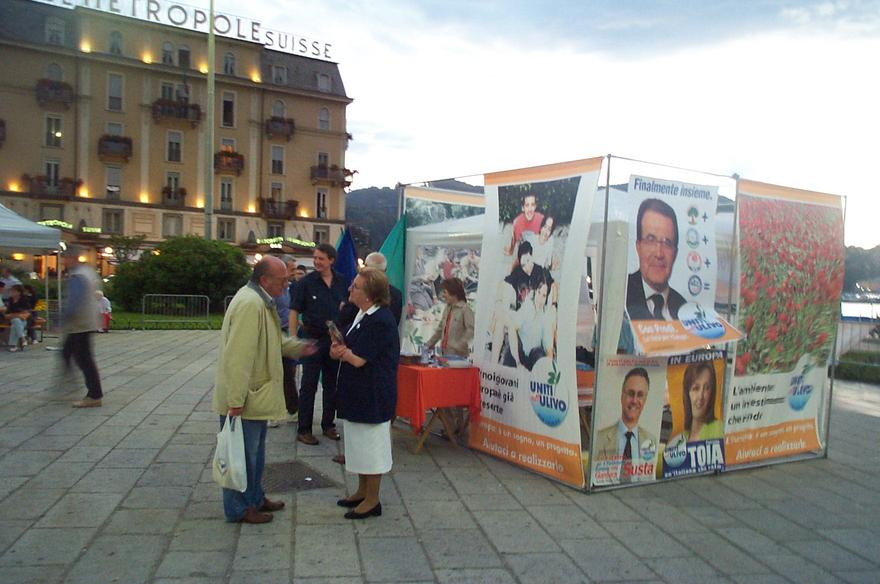
A street stall during the campaign for the European Parliament election in Como

On 10 February 2005, the name and logo of that larger electoral coalition was presented. Its name was The Union (L'Unione). It comprised the Federation of The Olive Tree, the Communist Refoundation Party (PRC), the Party of Italian Communists (PdCI), Italy of Values (IdV), the Federation of the Greens and other minor parties.

=== Democratic Party ===
The Democrats of the Left (DS), Democracy is Freedom – The Daisy (DL) and the European Republicans Movement (MRE) decided to form a joint electoral list for the 2006 Italian general election. Also the Italian Democratic Socialist Party (a different party from SDI) and The Italian Socialists had candidates in the list. The Italian Democratic Socialists (SDI), which were part of the federation and fight the 2004 European and the 2005 regional elections within it, decided not to take part of the joint electoral list for the 2006 general election and, otherwise, to form a common list with the Italian Radicals called Rose in the Fist within The Union coalition.

DS and DL were heavily involved in the foundation of a new unitary centre-left party, the Democratic Party, a project strongly supported by Romano Prodi since his entrance into politics in 1995. This party was founded on 14 October 2007 and Walter Veltroni was elected party leader by voters in an open primary.

== Electoral results ==
=== Italian Parliament ===
Election	Leader	Chamber of Deputies					Senate of the Republic				
Election	Leader	Votes	%	Seats	+/–	Position	Votes	%	Seats	+/–	Position
1996	Romano Prodi	16,355,985	43.6	323 / 630	New	1st	14,548,006	44.6	167 / 315	New	1st
2001	Francesco Rutelli	16,209,944	43.5	247 / 630	▼75	▼2nd	13,282,495	39.2	128 / 315	▼41	▼2nd

=== European Parliament ===
European Parliament
Election year	Votes	%	Seats	+/−	Leader
2004	10,105,836 (1st)	31.2	24 / 78	–	Romano Prodi

== Symbols ==
1996 & 2006

2001

2004

2005

== See also ==
- Centre-left coalition
