= Insalaco =

Insalaco is an Italian surname. Notable people with the surname include:

- Giuseppe Insalaco (1941–1988), Italian politician
- Kim Insalaco (born 1980), American ice hockey player
