= Elda Pucci =

Italian politician and professor

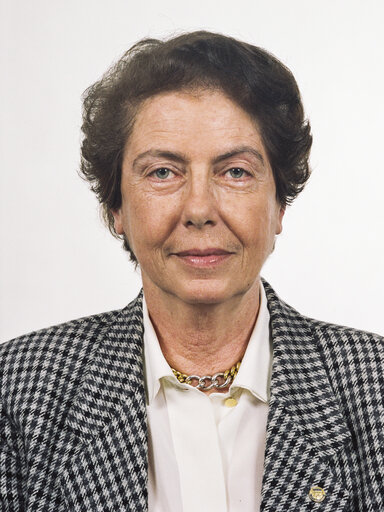

Mayor of Palermo
- In office 19 April 1983 – 13 April 1984
- Preceded by: Nello Martellucci
- Succeeded by: Giuseppe Insalaco

Member of the European Parliament
- In office 24 March 1992 – 18 July 1994

Personal details
- Born: 21 February 1928 Trapani, Italy
- Died: 14 October 2005 (aged 77) Palermo, Italy
- Party: Christian Democracy
- Parent: Stefano Pucci
- Relatives: Evelina Pucci (sister)
- Education: University of Palermo
- Occupation: University professor, medic

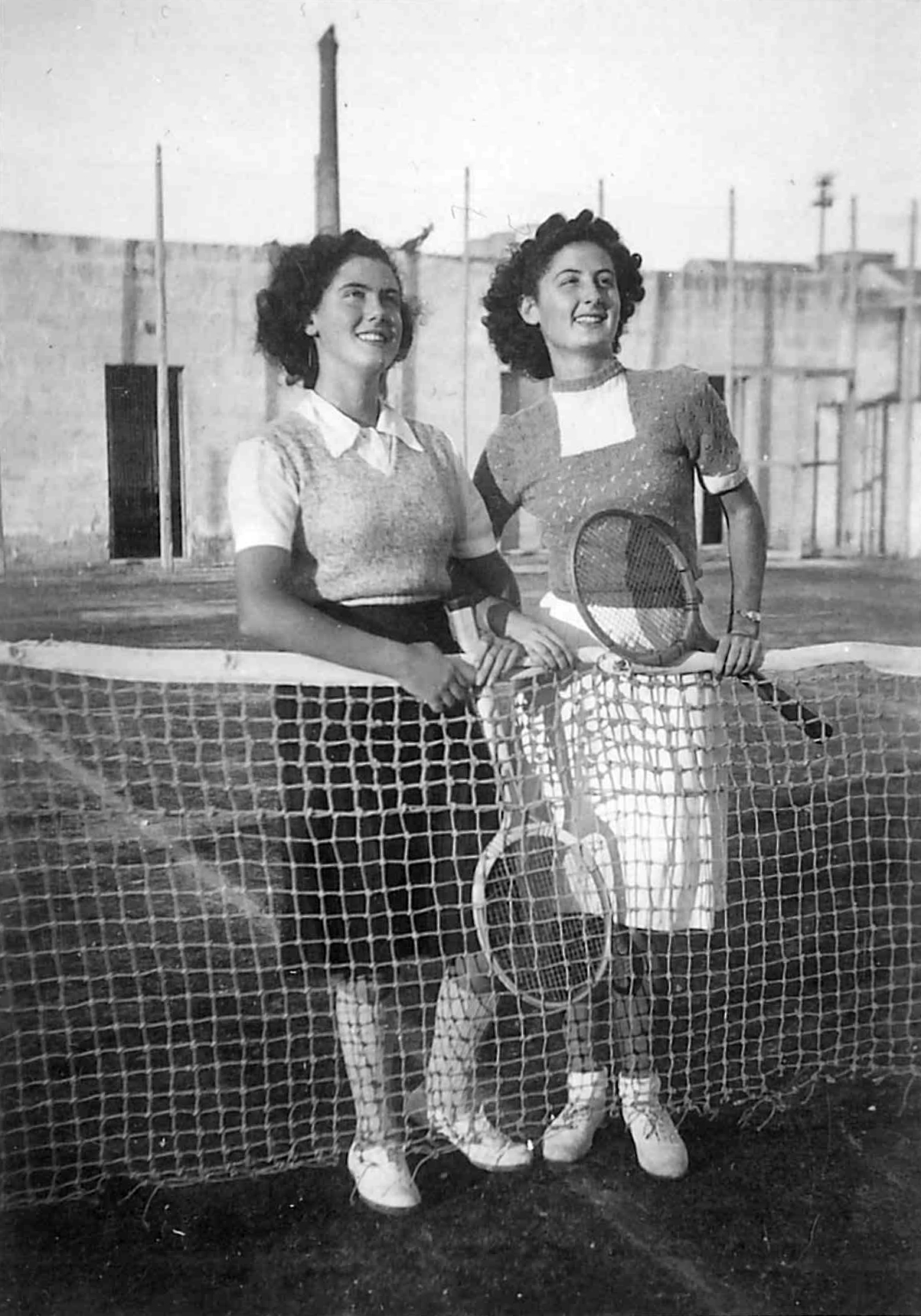

Elda Pucci (21 February 1928 – 14 October 2005) was an Italian politician and professor.

== Biography ==
Elda Pucci was born in Trapani, Italy in 1928 and died in Palermo, Italy in 2005 at the age of 77. She is daughter of Stefano Pucci. She graduated from the University of Palermo.

She was member of the Christian Democracy. She has served as Mayor of Palermo from 1983 to 1984.

She was Member of the European Parliament from 1992 to 1994. She participated in the tennis competitions of the VII National Women's Championship of the Gioventù Italiana del Littorio in 1942. She was national president of the Soroptimist Club of Italy from 1987 to 1989.

She was mayor of the Sicilian capital from 1983 to 1984, the first woman in a large Italian city.

She was several times a municipal councilor of the Christian Democracy in Palermo.

== See also ==
- List of mayors of Palermo

Political offices
Preceded by Nello Martellucci	Mayor of Palermo; 19 April 1983 – 13 April 1984	Succeeded by Giuseppe Insalaco
Preceded by -	Member of the European Parliament; 24 March 1992 – 18 July 1994	Succeeded by -
