= The Network (political party) =

Italian political party

The Network La Rete
- Leader: Leoluca Orlando
- Founded: 24 January 1991; 21 March 1991
- Dissolved: 27 February 1999
- Split from: Christian Democracy
- Merged into: The Democrats
- Ideology: Anti-corruption
- Political position: Centre-left
- National affiliation: Alliance of Progressives (1993–95); The Olive Tree (1995–99)
- European Parliament group: Green Group (1994–99)

The Network (Italian: La Rete), whose complete name was Movement for Democracy – The Network (Movimento per la Democrazia – La Rete), was a political party in Italy led by Leoluca Orlando.

== History ==
The party was formed on 24 January 1991 by Leoluca Orlando, mayor of Palermo and member of the Christian Democracy, who had parted ways with this party in 1991 due to its relations with the Mafia. The party was Catholic-inspired, and included several former members of the Italian Communist Party (Diego Novelli, Alfredo Galasso, etc.), anti-Mafia and anti-corruption. It proposed an end to parliamentary immunity, greater judicial powers to tackle Mafia, and a parliament with fewer lawmakers. Describing itself as a social movement rather than a political party, the Network aimed to be a loose "civic movement" without formal memberships or rigid party structure.

The party succeeded in gaining elected office in Sicily, including five seats in the 1991 regional election (thanks to 7.4% of the vote) and, again, the mayorship of Palermo in 1993. In the 1992 national election, the party won 1.9% (nationally), 12 deputies and 3 senators, who teamed up with those of the Federation of the Greens.

It later participated in the Alliance of Progressives, which included the Democratic Party of the Left, the Democratic Alliance, the Federation of the Greens, the Communist Refoundation Party, the Italian Socialist Party and the Social Christians. The coalition unsuccessfully contested the 1994 general election against Silvio Berlusconi's centre-right coalitions, the Pole of Freedoms and the Pole of Good Government, and the party had 1.9% of the vote, 6 deputies and 6 senators.

In the 1996 general election the party was part of The Olive Tree coalition and elected in single-member districts five deputies, who divided themselves between the Democrats of the Left and a sub-group named "Italy of Values", and one senator. After the election, Orlando stated the aim of creating a "Democratic Party" modelled on the Democratic Party of the United States and the party changed its name to The Network for the Democratic Party. In 1999 it was absorbed by The Democrats of Romano Prodi. Before that, some of its members had joined Antonio Di Pietro's Italy of Values, which was also merged into The Democrats.

After The Democrats (1999–2002), Orlando would later be active in Democracy is Freedom – The Daisy, Italy of Values and The Network 2018.

== Election results ==
=== Italian Parliament ===
Chamber of Deputies
Election year	Votes	%	Seats	+/−	Leader
1992	730,171 (11th)	1.9	12 / 630	–	Leoluca Orlando
1994	719,841 (11th)	1.9	6 / 630	▼6	Leoluca Orlando
1996	into Ulivo	–	5 / 630	▼1	Leoluca Orlando

Senate of the Republic
Election year	Votes	%	Seats	+/−	Leader
1992	239,868 (12th)	0.7	3 / 315	–	Leoluca Orlando
1994	into AdP	–	6 / 315	▲3	Leoluca Orlando
1996	into Ulivo	–	1 / 315	▼5	Leoluca Orlando

=== European Parliament ===
European Parliament
Election year	Votes	%	Seats	+/−	Leader
1994	366,258 (11th)	1.1	1 / 81	–	Leoluca Orlando

== Literature ==
- Foot, John M. (1996). The 'Left Opposition' and the crisis: Rifondazione Comunista and La Rete. Routledge. pp. 173–188. ISBN 0-415-12161-2.
