= Aldo Rizzo =

Italian politician and magistrate (1935–2021)

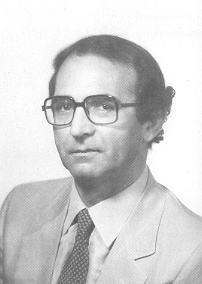
- Rizzo in the 1980s

Mayor of Palermo
- In office 29 June 1992 – 3 December 1992
- Preceded by: Domenico Lo Vasco
- Succeeded by: Manlio Orobello

Member of the Chamber of Deputies
- In office 20 June 1979 – 22 April 1992

Member of the CSM
- In office 18 December 1976 – 19 April 1979

Personal details
- Born: 24 May 1935 Palermo, Italy
- Died: 9 November 2021 (aged 86) Palermo, Italy
- Party: Independent Left
- Education: University of Palermo
- Occupation: Magistrate

Aldo Rizzo (24 May 1935 – 9 November 2021) was an Italian politician and magistrate.

== Biography ==
Born in Palermo in 1935, Rizzo was a member of the Independent Left. He served as Mayor of Palermo from August 1992 to December 1992.

He was elected as an independent on the list of the Italian Communist Party first, and then the Democratic Party of the Left to the municipal council of Palermo. He left the Democratic Party in March 1992.

He dealt with the kidnapping of the businessman Luciano Cassina in 1974. He was also re-elected in 1983 and 1987 in western Sicily, serving as secretary of the presidential council of the chamber. He was also chosen to serve on the judiciary's Superior Council.

He was regional president in Sicily. He was PM in the trial for the murder of the Palermo prosecutor Pietro Scaglione, an instructor judge at the Palermo court. He became a judge of the Cassation.

Rizzo died on 9 November 2021, at the age of 86.

== See also ==
- List of mayors of Palermo

Political offices
Preceded by Domenico Lo Vasco	Mayor of Palermo; 29 June 1992 — 17 October 1992	Succeeded by Manlio Orobello
