= Diego Cammarata =

Italian politician and lawyer

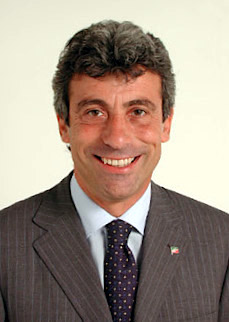
- Cammarata in 2001

Mayor of Palermo
- In office 5 December 2001 – 26 January 2012
- Preceded by: Leoluca Orlando
- Succeeded by: Leoluca Orlando

Personal details
- Born: March 27, 1951 (age 75) Palermo, Sicily, Italy
- Party: Forza Italia (1994-2009); The People of Freedom (2009-2013)
- Education: University of Palermo
- Occupation: Lawyer

Diego Cammarata (born 27 March 1951) is an Italian politician.

He was member of The People of Freedom Party. He served as mayor of Palermo from 2001 to 2012. He was the provincial coordinator of Forza Italia from 1996 to 2001. He was elected president of the Associazione Nazionale Comuni Italiani in Sicily on 22 July 2008.

He resigned as mayor of Palermo in January 2012, a few months before the natural expiry.

== Biography ==
Diego Cammarata was born in Palermo, Italy in 1951. He has been a professor of information and communication law and of image promotion theory and technique at the University of Palermo.

== See also ==
- List of mayors of Palermo

Political offices
Preceded by Guglielmo Serio	Mayor of Palermo; 5 December 2001—26 January 2012	Succeeded by Luisa Latella
