= The Network 2018 =

The Network 2018 La Rete 2018
- Leader: Leoluca Orlando
- Founded: 21 March 2011
- Dissolved: 26 January 2018
- Split from: Italy of Values
- Merged into: Democratic Party
- Ideology: Progressivism; Anti-corruption; Environmentalism
- Political position: Centre-left to left-wing
- National affiliation: RC (2013 election)

Website
- www.laretitudine.net

The Network 2018 (Italian: La Rete 2018) was a centre-left political party in Italy led by Leoluca Orlando, former leading member of Christian Democracy in Sicily, founder of The Network and The Democrats, and five-time mayor of Palermo.

The party, which considered itself a re-foundation of The Network (established, among others, by Orlando in 1991), was launched in 2011 and caused a split from Italy of Values (IdV) in 2013. Along Orlando, splinters from IdV notably included Fabio Giambrone, a former member of the Chamber of Deputies, and Niccolò Rinaldi, a former member of the European Parliament.

In 2013 Orlando launched a parallel party named 139 Movement along with two other leading IdV dissidents, Felice Belisario (former IdV floor leader in the Senate) and Carlo Costantini (regional councillor in Abruzzo). The name was a reference to the 139 articles of the Constitution of Italy. In the 2017 Italian local elections in Palermo the M139 obtained 8.6% of the vote, enough to be the largest party of the fractured local centre-left coalition.

In 2018 Orlando and his closest allies, notably including his deputy mayor Giambrone, joined the Democratic Party. For their part, Rinaldi returned to his original affiliation to the Italian Republican Party, Belisario abandoned active politics and Costantini joined Action.

== Leadership ==
- President: Leoluca Orlando
- Vice President: Matteo Viviano
- Secretary: Alessandro D'Uffizi
