= Gioacchino Scaduto =

Italian politician, teacher and jurist

Mayor of Palermo
- In office 3 July 1952 – 14 December 1955
- Preceded by: Guido Avolio
- Succeeded by: Luciano Maugeri

Personal details
- Born: 1898 Licata, Italy
- Died: 1979 (aged 80–81) Licata, Italy
- Party: Christian Democracy
- Occupation: Teacher; Jurist

Gioacchino Scaduto (1898–1979) was an Italian politician, teacher and jurist.

He was member of the Christian Democracy Party. He has served as Mayor of Palermo from 1952 to 1955.

He was rector of the University of Palermo from 1935 to 1938.

== Biography ==
Gioacchino Scaduto was born in Licata, Italy on 1898 and died in Licata, Italy on 1979. He was a professor of private and civil law at the University of Palermo.

== Awards ==
- Order of Merit of the Italian Republic — 2 June 1955

== See also ==
- List of mayors of Palermo

Political offices
Preceded by Guido Avolio	Mayor of Palermo; January 1952—April 1956	Succeeded by Luciano Maugeri
