= Domenico Lo Vasco =

Italian politician and lawyer (1928–2020)

Mayor of Palermo
- In office 15 August 1990 – 28 June 1992
- Preceded by: Leoluca Orlando
- Succeeded by: Aldo Rizzo

Personal details
- Born: 20 April 1928 Brescia, Italy
- Died: 17 April 2020 (aged 91) Palermo, Italy
- Party: Christian Democracy
- Occupation: Lawyer

Domenico Lo Vasco (20 April 1928—17 April 2020) was an Italian politician and lawyer.

He was member of the Christian Democracy Party. He served as Mayor of Palermo from 1990 to 1992. He was a member of the regional committee between 1980 and 1986.

After 1997, he worked solely as a criminal lawyer in 1997. He was a municipal councilor of Palermo for five years.

== Biography ==
Domenico Lo Vasco was born in Brescia, Italy on 1928 and died in Palermo, Italy on 2020 at the age of 91. He was a criminal lawyer. He was graduated in political science and law.

== See also ==
- List of mayors of Palermo

Political offices
Preceded by Leoluca Orlando	Mayor of Palermo; 15 August 1990—28 June 1992	Succeeded by Aldo Rizzo
