= List of mayors of Palermo =

Mayor of Palermo
- Sindaco di Palermo

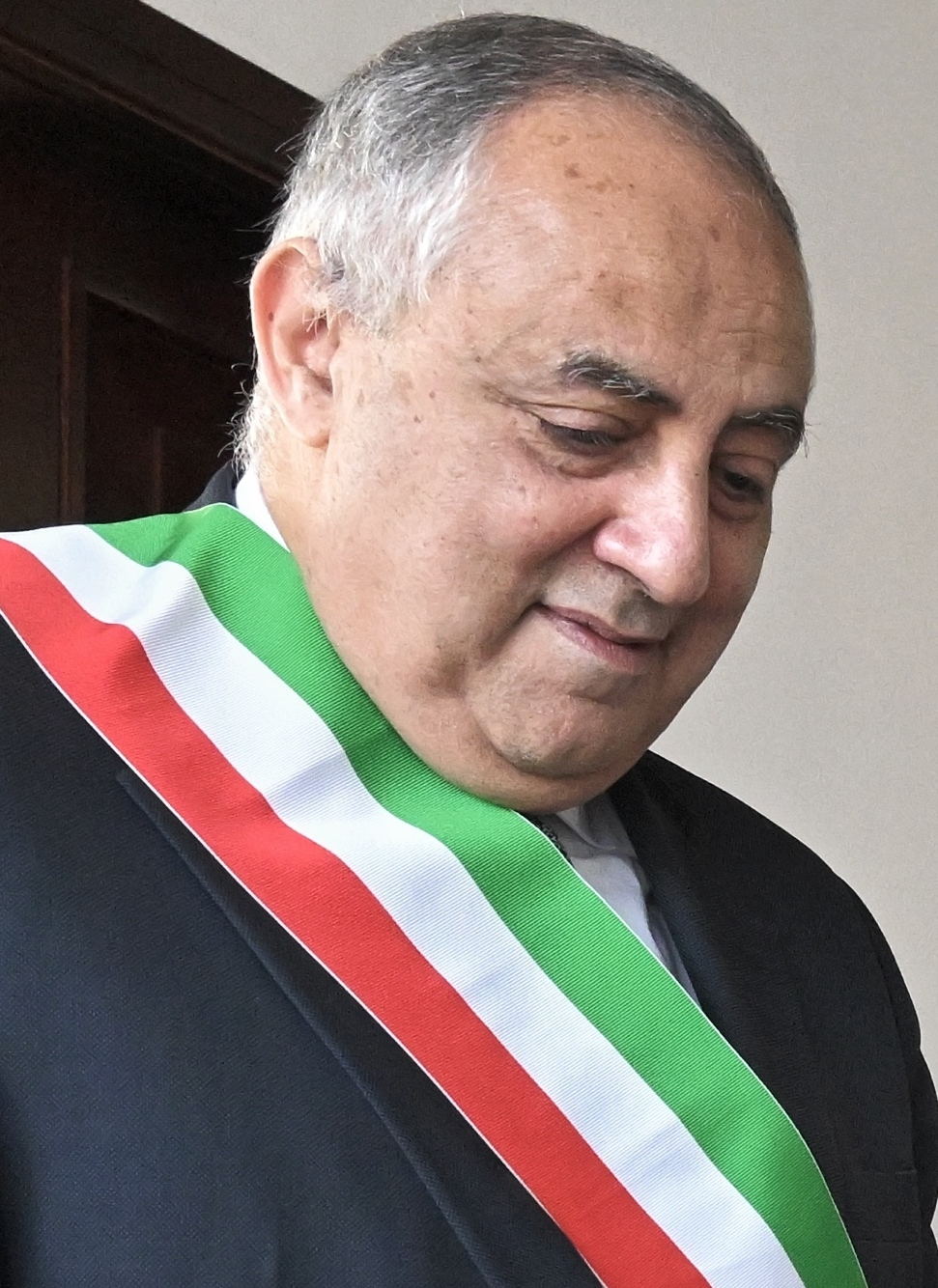
- Incumbent; Roberto Lagalla since 20 June 2022
- Residence: Palazzo Pretorio
- Appointer: Popular election
- Term length: 5 years, renewable once
- Inaugural holder: Salesio Balsano
- Formation: July 1861
- Salary: €121,188
- Website: Official website

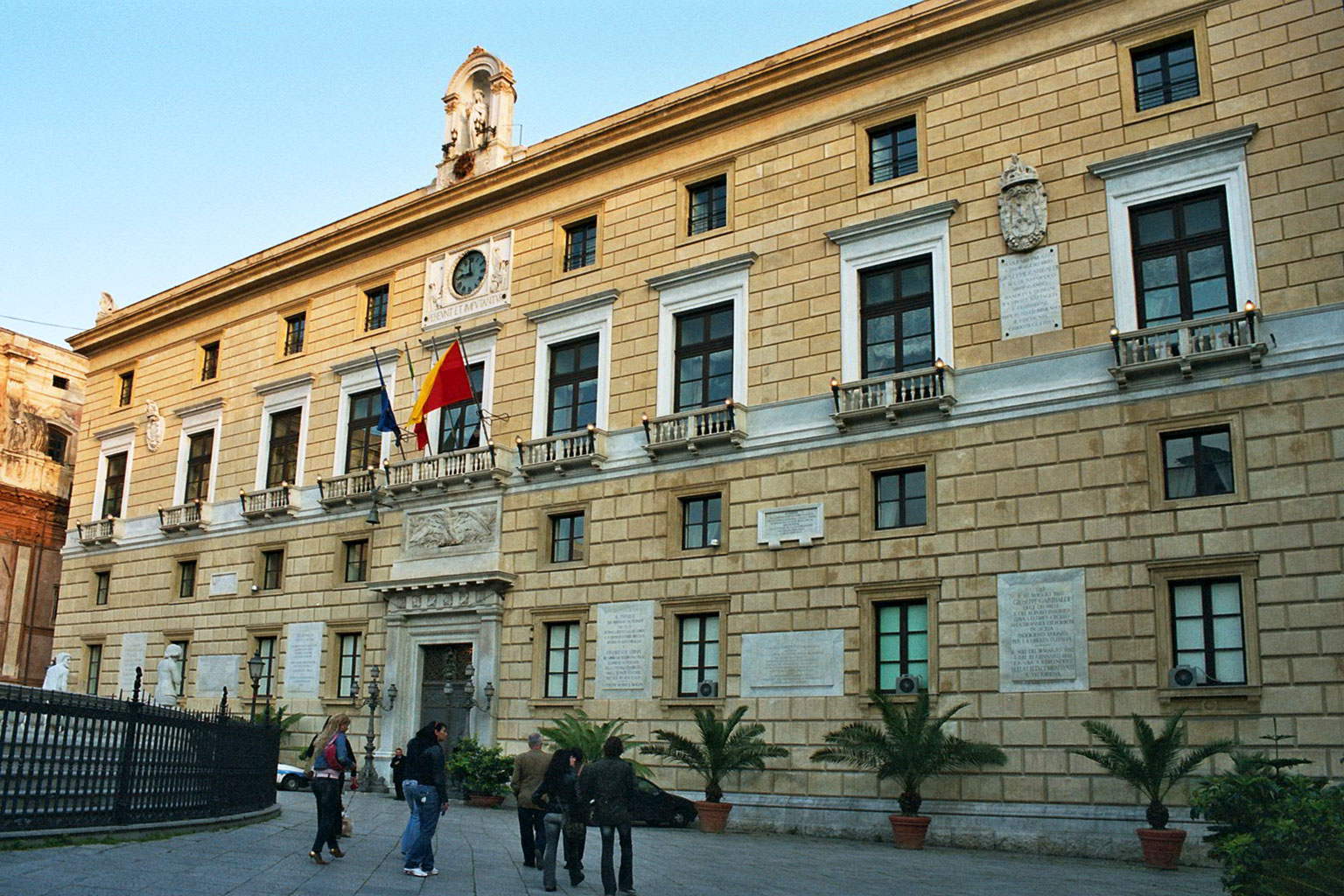
Palermo's City Hall

The mayor of Palermo is an elected politician who, along with the Palermo's city council, is accountable for the strategic government of Palermo in Sicily, Italy. The current mayor is Roberto Lagalla, who took office on 20 June 2022.

== Overview ==
According to the Italian Constitution, the mayor of Palermo is a member of the Palermo city council.

The mayor is elected by the population of Palermo. Citizens elect also the members of the city council, which also controls the mayor's policy guidelines and is able to enforce his resignation by a motion of no confidence. The mayor is entitled to appoint and release the members of his government.

Since 1993 the mayor has been elected directly by Palermo's electorate: in all mayoral elections in Italy in cities with a population higher than 15,000 the voters express a direct choice for the mayor or an indirect choice voting for the party of the candidate's coalition. If no candidate receives at least 50% of votes, the top two candidates go to a second round after two weeks. The election of the city council is based on a direct choice for the candidate with a preference vote: the candidate with the majority of the preferences is elected. The number of the seats for each party is determined proportionally.

== Kingdom of Italy (1861–1946) ==
=== Mayors ===
In 1861, the nascent Kingdom of Italy created the office of the mayor of Palermo (Italian: Sindaco di Palermo), chosen by the city council.

- 1861–1862: Salesio Balsano
- 1862–1863: Mariano Stabile
- 1863–1866: Antonio Starabba, Marchese di Rudinì
- 1866–1868: Salesio Balsano
- 1868–1873: Domenico Peranni
- 1873–1876: Emanuale Notarbartolo
- 1876–1878: Francesco Paolo Perez
- 1878–1880: Giovanni Raffaele
- 1880–1881: Salesio Balsano
- 1881–1882: Nicolò Turrisi Colonna
- 1882–1885: Pietro Ugo Delle Favare
- 1885: Salvatore Romano Lo Faso
- 1885: Giuseppe La Farina
- 1885: Fortunato Vergara di Craco
- 1885–1886: Giulio Benso della Verdura
- 1886–1887: Nicolò Turrisi Colonna
- 1887–1890: Giulio Benso della Verdura
- 1890–1892: Emanuele Paternò
- 1892–1893: Pietro Ugo Delle Favare
- 1893–1895: Eugenio Olivieri
- 1895–1897: Angelo Pantaleone
- 1897–1898: Michele Amato Pojero
- 1898–1900: Eugenio Olivieri
- 1900: Mario Rebucci
- 1900–1901: Paolo Beccadelli di Bologna
- 1901–1902: Giuseppe Tasca Lanza
- 1902: Pietro Vayrat
- 1902–1903: Giuseppe Tasca Lanza
- 1903–1905: Pietro Bonanno
- 1905–1906: Girolamo di Martino
- 1906–1907: Giuseppe Tasca Lanza
- 1907–1908: Paolo Francesco Tesauro
- 1908–1909: Gennaro Bladier
- 1909–1910: Romualdo Trigona di Sant'Elia
- 1910: Francesco Moncada Grispo
- 1910–1911: Francesco Gay
- 1911–1912: Girolamo Di Martino
- 1912–1914: Vincenzo Di Salvo
- 1914–1920: Salvatore Tagliavia
- 1920–1924: Giuseppe Lanza di Scalea
- 1924–1925: Gennaro Di Donato
- 1925: Domenico Delli Santi
- 1925–1926: Salvatore Di Marzo

=== Fascist Podestà ===
The Fascist dictatorship abolished mayors and city councils in 1926, replacing them with an authoritarian Podestà chosen by the National Fascist Party:

- 1926–1929: Salvatore Di Marzo
- 1929–1933: Michele Spadafora
- 1933–1934: prefectural dictator Giuseppe Borrelli
- 1934–1939: Giuseppe Noto
- 1939–1943: Giuseppe Sofia
- 1943–1946: some special commissioners (Allied invasion of Sicily)

== Republic of Italy (1946–present) ==
=== City council selection (1946–1993) ===
From 1946 to 1993, the mayor of Palermo was chosen by the city council.

	Mayor	Term start	Term end	Party	Coalition
1	Gennaro Patricolo	November 1946	March 1948	UQ	UQ • PLI
2	Guido Avolio	March 1948	November 1948	UQ	DC • PRI • PLI • UQ
3	Gaspare Causenza	November 1948	March 1951	DC	DC • PRI • PLI
(2)	Guido Avolio	November 1951	January 1952	DC	DC • PRI • PLI
4	Gioacchino Scaduto	July 1952	December 1955	DC	DC • PRI • PLI
5	Luciano Maugeri	June 1956	May 1958	DC	DC • PRI • PLI
6	Salvatore Lima	June 1958	January 1963	DC	DC • PRI • PLI
7	Francesco Saverio Diliberto	January 1963	June 1964	DC	DC • PRI • PLI
8	Paolo Bevilacqua	July 1964	January 1965	DC	DC • PRI • PLI
(6)	Salvatore Lima	January 1965	July 1966	DC	DC • PRI • PLI
(8)	Paolo Bevilacqua	July 1966	October 1968	DC	DC • PRI • PLI
9	Francesco Spagnolo	October 1968	November 1970	DC	DC
10	Vito Ciancimino	November 1970	April 1971	DC	DC • PRI • PLI
11	Giacomo Marchello	April 1971	January 1976	DC	DC • PRI • PLI
12	Carmelo Scoma	January 1976	October 1978	DC	DC • PRI • PLI
13	Giovanni Lapi	October 1978	November 1978	DC	DC • PRI • PLI
14	Salvatore Mantione	November 1978	July 1980	DC	DC • PRI • PLI
15	Nello Martellucci	July 1980	April 1983	DC	DC • PRI • PLI
16	Elda Pucci	April 1983	April 1984	DC	DC • PSI • PRI • PLI
17	Giuseppe Insalaco	April 1984	August 1984	DC	DC • PSI • PRI • PLI
18	Stefano Camilleri	August 1984	October 1984	DC	DC • PSI • PRI • PLI
(15)	Nello Martellucci	October 1984	December 1984	DC	DC • PSI • PRI • PLI
19	Leoluca Orlando	July 1985	August 1990	DC	DC • PSI • PRI • PLI
20	Domenico Lo Vasco	August 1990	June 1992	DC	DC • PSI • PRI • PLI
21	Aldo Rizzo	June 1992	December 1992	SI	PDS • FdV • PSDI • SI
22	Manlio Orobello	December 1992	April 1993	PSI	DC • PSI • PRI • PLI

=== Direct election (since 1993) ===
Since 1993, under provisions of new local administration law, the mayor of Palermo is chosen by direct election, originally every four, and later every five years.

	Mayor of Palermo	Took office	Left office	Party	Coalition	Election
(19)	Leoluca Orlando (b. 1947)	3 December 1993	5 December 1997	LR	Progressives (PDS-PRC-LR-FdV)	1993
(19)	Leoluca Orlando (b. 1947)	5 December 1997	18 December 2000 (Note: Resigned in order to participate in the 2001 regional election.)	LR	The Olive Tree (PDS-PPI-PRC-LR-FdV)	1997
Special Commissioner tenure (19 December 2000 – 4 December 2001)
23	Diego Cammarata (b. 1951)	5 December 2001	14 May 2007	FI; PdL	House of Freedoms (FI-AN-CCD-CDU)	2001
23	Diego Cammarata (b. 1951)	14 May 2007	26 January 2012	FI; PdL	House of Freedoms (FI-AN-UDC)	2007
Special Commissioner tenure (27 January – 22 May 2012)
(19)	Leoluca Orlando (b. 1947)	22 May 2012	22 June 2017	LR18; PD	IdV • FdS • FdV and leftist lists	2012
(19)	Leoluca Orlando (b. 1947)	22 June 2017	20 June 2022	LR18; PD	PD • SI • PRC and leftist lists	2017
24	Roberto Lagalla (b. 1955)	20 June 2022	Incumbent	UDC	FI • FdI • IV; Lega • UDC	2022

== See also ==
- Timeline of Palermo
