= Leoluca Orlando =

Italian politician (born 1947)

Leoluca Orlando MEP
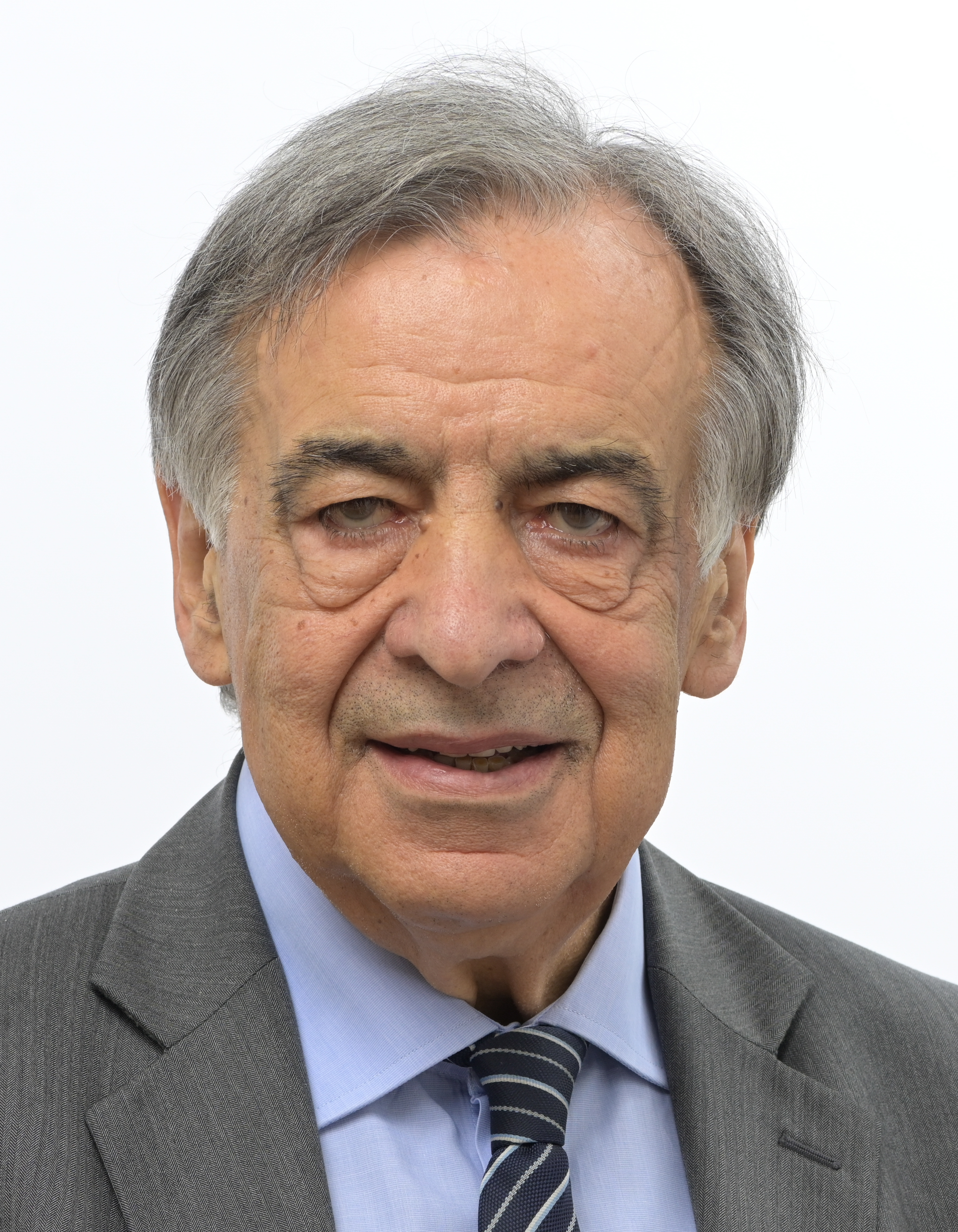
- Official portrait, 2024

Mayor of Palermo
- In office 22 May 2012 – 20 June 2022
- Preceded by: Diego Cammarata
- Succeeded by: Roberto Lagalla
- In office 3 December 1993 – 18 December 2000
- Preceded by: Manlio Orobello
- Succeeded by: Diego Cammarata
- In office 16 July 1985 – 14 August 1990
- Preceded by: Nello Martellucci
- Succeeded by: Domenico Lo Vasco

Member of the Chamber of Deputies
- In office 28 April 2006 – 10 July 2012
- Constituency: Sicily (2006–2008); Lazio (2008–2012)
- In office 23 April 1992 – 14 April 1994
- Constituency: Palermo

Member of the European Parliament for Italian Islands
- Incumbent
- Assumed office 16 July 2024
- In office 19 July 1994 – 19 July 1999

Personal details
- Born: 1 August 1947 (age 79) Palermo, Italy
- Party: AVS (2024–present); Greens/EFA (2024–present)
- Other political affiliations: DC (1976–1991); LR (1991–1999); Dem (1999–2002); DL (2002–2005); IdV (2005–2012); LR 2018 (2012–2018); PD (2018–2024)
- Education: University of Palermo

Leoluca Orlando (born 1 August 1947) is an Italian politician. He was mayor of Palermo for over twenty years and was president of the Italian Federation of American Football (FIDAF). He is best known for his strong opposition to the Sicilian Mafia during his mayoralty in the 1980s, which was publicly referenced in the media as the Palermo Spring (Italian: Primavera di Palermo).

== Early life and education ==
Orlando was born in Palermo,Italy. He completed secondary school at the Gonzaga Institute, Palermo in 1965. From 1969 to 1970 he studied Comparative Public law and International law at the University of Heidelberg. After that he was a Court of Cassation lawyer and a tenured professor of regional public law at the University of Palermo.

Orlando is married and has two daughters.

== Career ==
=== Opposition to the Sicilian Mafia and first mayorship ===
He was a member of Christian Democracy (DC), in the left wing of the party. He entered politics in 1976 as legal adviser to Christian Democratic reformer Piersanti Mattarella, who became president of the Sicilian Region in 1978. The two men set out to break the Mafia's hold on the island, transferring budget authority from the corrupt regional government back to the cities and passing a law enforcing the same building standards used in the rest of Italy, thereby making the Mafia's building schemes illegal. In retaliation, the Mafia killed Mattarella in January 1980.

The brother of Mattarella and other associates urged him to run for the Palermo municipal council, he ran successfully, and was elected mayor by the town council in 1985. From 1985-1990 he was elected mayor of Palermo, and received many threats as a result of his open opposition to the power of the Mafia in the city. He was re-elected as mayor in 1993 with 75.2% of the vote. In 1992 he was also elected to the Italian Chamber of Deputies. Two years later he became a member of the European Parliament.

Leoluca Orlando attacked harshly Giovanni Falcone accusing him of having "kept closed in the drawers" a series of documents concerning the excellent mafia crimes. The charges were also addressed to the judge Roberto Scarpinato and the prosecutor Pietro Giammanco, believed to be close to Andreotti. Falcone substantially dissented from Orlando's conclusions on political responsibilities regarding the actions of the mafia dome (the so-called "third level"), arguing as always the need for certain evidence and branding such claims as "political cynicism". Addressed directly to Orlando, he will say: "If the mayor of Palermo knows something, name and surname, cite the facts, take responsibility for what he said. Otherwise keep quiet: it is not lawful to speak in the absence of the interested parties".

=== Investigation of corruption ===
In 1996 he was investigated for aggravated corruption during the exercise of his duties as mayor of Palermo. The repentant Tullio Cannella says that in 1986 the municipality of Palermo, after a bribe of 200 million lire, bought the apartments of Joseph Bonanno, famous Italian-American crime boss of the Bonanno crime family, which he ran from 1931 to 1968. Recipients of the bribe, according to the repentant, were the Mayor Leoluca Orlando and the councilor Vincenzo Inzerillo, who at the time of the facts was in prison for 16 months for mafia. Orlando denied any responsibility, and declared himself innocent, stating that the accusations against him were false. The affair for Leoluca Orlando had no judicial follow-up. No charges were filed.

=== The Network and The Daisy ===
After the dissolution of the DC, he founded a popular movement called The Network ("La Rete"), which in 1999 joined with Romano Prodi's Democrats. In 2001 he was among the founders of The Daisy, an Italian party currently including most of the former left-wing members of DC.

In December 2000 he resigned from the position of mayor and was a candidate for the presidency of the autonomous region of Sicily. He was, however, defeated by the centre-right candidate Salvatore Cuffaro. In 2006 he was expelled from the Daisy party, after having shown his full support for the candidacy of Rita Borsellino in the Sicilian presidential centre-left primary election, contrary to the line of his party that supported its member Ferdinando Latteri. He subsequently joined the Italy of Values of Antonio Di Pietro with whom he was elected at the Italian Chamber of Deputies. He has been the President of the Parliamentary Commission for Regional affairs.

In May 2007 he ran as centre-left candidate for mayor of Palermo, after having won the centre-left primary election in a landslide with about 72% of the votes. He however lost to incumbent Diego Cammarata of the House of Freedoms, who obtained about 53% of votes compared with Orlando's 45%. Following the results, Orlando denounced massive electoral frauds and asked for the annulment of the vote.

In the 2008 Italian general election Orlando was elected with Italy of Values (IdV) in the Chamber of Deputies.

In 2011 launched The Network 2018, a re-foundation of The Network, and finally left IdV in 2013. Along Orlando, splinters from IdV notably included Fabio Giambrone, a former member of the Chamber of Deputies, and Niccolò Rinaldi, a former member of the European Parliament.

=== Re-election as mayor of Palermo and recent events ===
In March 2012 he announced his candidacy for Mayor of Palermo as an independent in the May elections, after having unsuccessfully supported Rita Borsellino's mayoral bid in a controversial primary election won by his former protégé Fabrizio Ferrandelli. In the first round, held on 5 May 2012, he was the most voted candidate with 48% of votes despite being only supported by his own Italy of Values and a number of minor left-wing parties (Federation of the Greens and Federation of the Left). He took part in the final round against second-placed Ferrandelli and on 21 May he won the runoff with 72% of the vote.

In May 2013 Orlando along other two leading IdV dissidents, Felice Belisario (former IdV floor leader in the Senate) and Carlo Costantini (regional councillor in Abruzzo), launched the 139 Movement (M139). The party's name was a reference to the 139 articles of the Constitution of Italy. In the 2017 Italian local elections in Palermo the M139 obtained 8.6% of the vote, enough to be the largest party of the fractured local centre-left coalition.

In the 2017 Italian local elections He was re-elected for a personal fifth term as mayor of Palermo, winning over 46% of votes in the first round, while the M139 obtained 8.6% of the vote, enough to be the largest party in the fractured local centre-left coalition.

In 2018 Orlando and his closest allies, notably including his deputy mayor Giambrone, joined the Democratic Party.

In June 2018, in defiance of orders from the Italian government, Orlando stated that he would allow the Aquarius, bearing 629 migrants rescued off the coast of Libya, to dock in Palermo. He stated "Palermo in ancient Greek meant ‘complete port’. We have always welcomed rescue boats and vessels who saved lives at sea. We will not stop now."

In 2020, Orlando was nominated for the Four Freedoms Award, Freedom from Fear.

During the last mandate of Orlando, the city of Palermo got several national and international recognitions, mainly due to its renewed international visibility, that boosted the tourism sector:
— in 2015, several monuments of the town, the so called "Palermo Arab-Normand path and the Cathedrals of Cefalù and Monreale" were included in the Unesco world heritage
— in 2017 it was awarded Italian Capital of youth
— in 2018 it was awarded Italian Capital of Culture
— in 2019 Michelin awarded the town with three stars, as recognition of its touristic appeal.

== Personal life ==
Since 2000, he has been the President of the "Sicilian Renaissance Institute" a non-profit organization dealing with the promotion of economy and culture of lawfulness and Human rights.

In 2016 he established Fondazione Mosaico, a non-profit dedicated to promoting cultural understanding, tolerance, and human rights. Tessera preziosa del Mosaico Palermo has become one of Palermo's most prestigious and respected awards, honouring citizens for their contribution to the social sphere of the city of Palermo.

Among other activities, in 2019 Orlando was appointed president of the Cinemed Mediterranean Film Festival, succeeding Aurélie Filippetti.
