= Luciana Sbarbati =

Italian politician

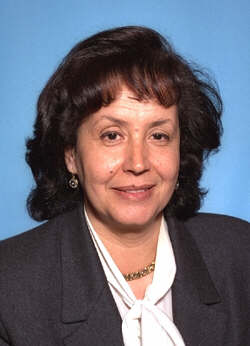

Member of the Senate
- In office 29 April 2008 – 14 March 2013
- Constituency: Sardinia

Member of the European Parliament
- In office 20 July 1999 – 29 April 2008
- Constituency: Central Italy

Member of the Chamber of Deputies
- In office 13 April 1992 – 20 July 1999
- Constituency: Marche

Personal details
- Born: 10 May 1946 (age 80) Rome, Italy
- Party: PRI (till 2001; 2011-2020); MRE (2001–2011; since 2020)
- Education: Libera Università Maria SS. Assunta
- Profession: Politician, school principal

Luciana Sbarbati (born 10 May 1946 in Rome) is an Italian politician.

She is a substitute for the Committee on Budgets and a member of the Delegation to the EU-Romania Joint Parliamentary Committee.

== Biography ==
She graduated in philosophy and psychology at the LUMSA in 1969. Luciana Sbarbati worked as a university assistant and school principal. As member of the Italian Republican Party, she was elected parliamentary Deputy in 1992, in 1994 (into the Alliance of Progressives) and 1996 (into the Populars for Prodi).

In 1999, she was elected MEP and was re-confirmed in 2004. As MEP she was member of the Bureau of the Alliance of Liberals and Democrats for Europe and sat on the European Parliament's Committee on Civil Liberties, Justice and Home Affairs and its Committee on Petitions.

In 2001, in opposition to the PRI's decision to forge an alliance with the House of Freedoms, she left the party and founded the European Republicans Movement.

In the 2008 general election she was elected Senator among the ranks of the Democratic Party. In 2011, with the reunification of PRI and MRE, sanctioned by the PRI congress held in Rome on 25–27 February, Luciana Sbarbati returned to the PRI and its National Directorate.

== Works ==
- Handicap e integrazione scolastica (20 anni di esperienze)
- Il messaggio morale e educativo di Antoine de Saint Exupéry
- Adolescenti incontro alla vita
- L'Europa e la sfida dei nuovi diritti di cittadinanza
