= European Republicans Movement =

European Republicans Movement Movimento Repubblicani Europei
- Leader: Luciana Sbarbati
- Founded: 6 March 2001; 8 August 2020 (relaunched)
- Dissolved: 26 June 2026
- Split from: Italian Republican Party
- Merged into: Italian Republican Party (2011–2020; after 2026)
- Headquarters: via IV Novembre 107–108, Rome
- Newspaper: none
- Membership (2006): 2,600
- Ideology: Social liberalism Radicalism
- Political position: Centre-left
- National affiliation: The Olive Tree (2001–2007); The Union (2005–2008); Democratic Party (2007–2010); PD–IDP (2022); Action (2024)
- European affiliation: ELDR

Website
- http://www.repubblicanieuropei.org/

The European Republicans Movement (Italian: Movimento Repubblicani Europei, MRE) was a minor social-liberal political party in Italy.

From 2007 to 2010 the party was a founding member and associate of the Democratic Party, the leading centre-left party in Italy. In 2011 the MRE was merged into the Italian Republican Party, the party from which it had seceded in 2001. The MRE was also a member of the pan-European European Liberal Democrat and Reform Party (ELDR), and its long-standing leader was Luciana Sbarbati.

== History ==
In 2001 the Italian Republican Party (PRI), after five years within the centre-left coalition, decided to join the centre-right House of Freedoms instead. The MRE was formed by those Republicans who refused such a decision and wanted to remain in the centre-left. The MRE took part in the consolidation of The Olive Tree as a joint centre-left electoral list both for the 2004 European Parliament election and the 2006 general election, along with the Democrats of the Left and Democracy is Freedom – The Daisy. The list won 220 out of 630 deputies (including two Republicans, Luciana Sbarbati and Adriano Musi) as part of The Union.

In 2007 the MRE was a founding member of the Democratic Party (PD), but continued to exist as an associate party and retained almost entirely its autonomy. In the 2008 general election, Sbarbati and Musi were elected to the Senate and often distinguished themselves from Democrats in key votes. Notably, they opposed European Parliament electoral law reform in 2009.

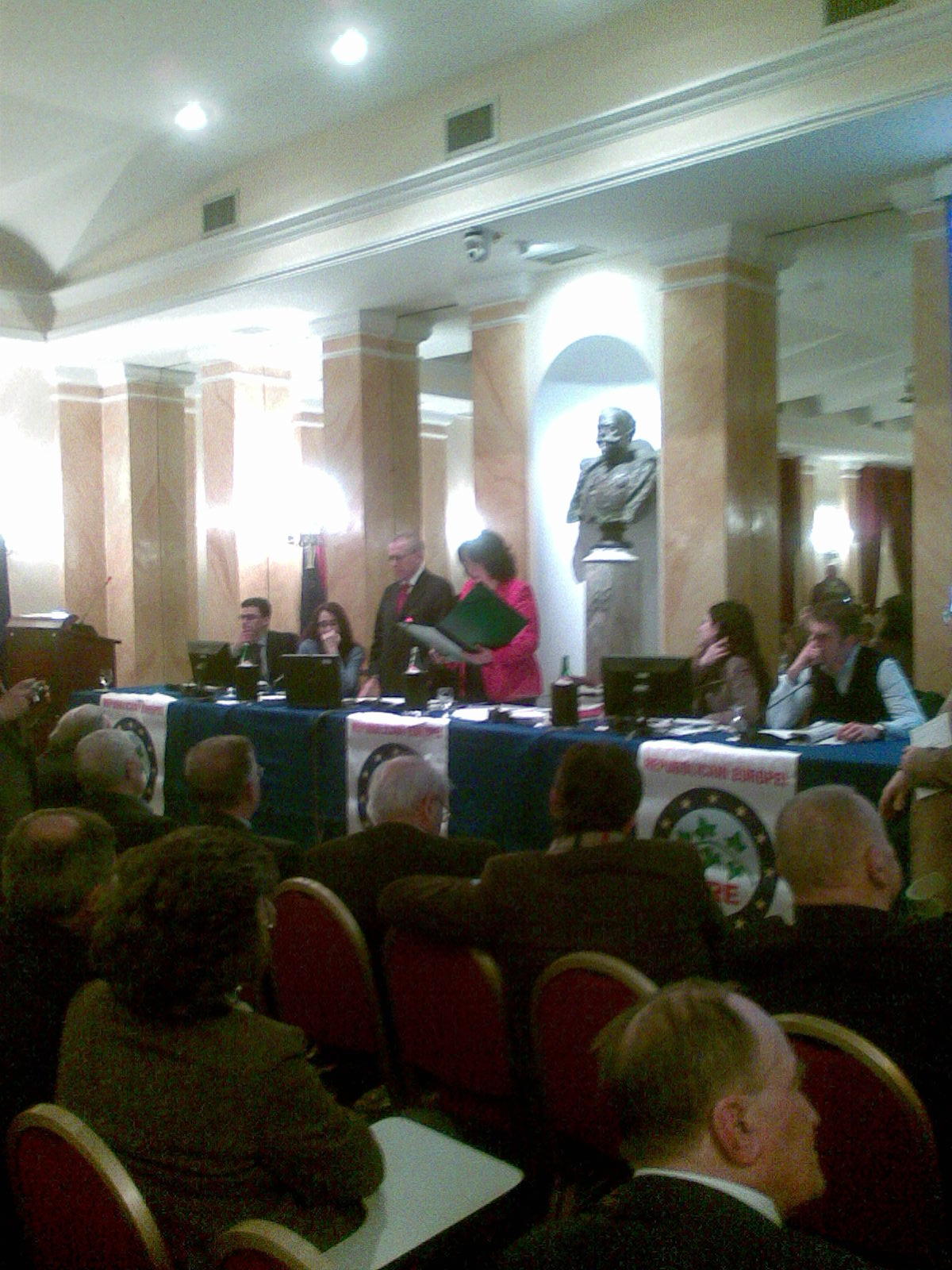
2009 Congress of the European Republicans Movement

The common battle against electoral reform favored a reconciliation with the PRI. During the 2009 congress of the MRE the two parties signed a joint declaration, under which - despite their different coalition allegiances - they pledged to join forces on key issues, especially those concerning civil liberties and freedom of research.

In April 2010, Sbarbati led the MRE out of the PD and joined the Union of the Centre (UdC) in the Senate. In January 2011 the party sought a reconciliation with the PRI, which was reached two months later.

Following the decision of the PRI to join the centre-right coalition in the 2020 regional elections, the MRE split away from it again and regained its autonomy. The two parties ran in separate coalitions during the 2022 elections: the MRE joined the Democratic Party - Democratic and Progressive Italy list, while the PRI joined the Action - Italia Viva list.

In the 2024 European Parliament election in Italy both MRE and PRI joined We are Europeans - Action. In 2026 a new reconciliation between the two republican parties was reached, and MRE dissolved into PRI.

== Leadership ==
- Secretary: Luciana Sbarbati (2001–2011, 2020–2026)
- President: Adriano Musi (2001–2010); Niccolò Rinaldi (2020–2026)

== Election results ==
=== Italian Parliament ===
Election	Leader	Chamber of Deputies				Senate of the Republic			
Election	Leader	Votes	%	Seats	+/–	Votes	%	Seats	+/–
2001	Luciana Sbarbati	7,997	0,02	0 / 630	New	Did not compete			
2006	Luciana Sbarbati	Into Ulivo		1 / 630	▲1	51,219	0.15	0 / 315	New
2008	Luciana Sbarbati	Into PD		0 / 630	▼1	Into PD		2 / 315	▲2
2022	Luciana Sbarbati	Into PD–IDP		0 / 400	Steady	Into PD–IDP		0 / 200	Steady

=== European Parliament ===
Election	Leader	Votes	%	Seats	+/–	EP Group
2004	Luciana Sbarbati	Into Ulivo		1 / 78	New	ALDE
2024	Luciana Sbarbati	Into Action		0 / 76	Steady	–
