= Oriental Orthodoxy in Italy =

Oriental Orthodoxy in Italy refers to adherents, religious communities, institutions and organizations of Oriental Orthodox Christianity in Italy. There are several distinctive Oriental Orthodox ecclesiastical jurisdictions on the territory of Italy, including:

- Armenian Orthodox Church in Italy
- Coptic Orthodox Church in Italy
- Eritrean Orthodox Church in Italy
- Ethiopian Orthodox Church in Italy

== See also ==
- Religion in Italy
- Christianity in Italy
- Catholic Church in Italy
- Protestantism in Italy

== Bibliography ==
- Giordan, Giuseppe; Guglielmi, Marco (2018). "Be Fruitful and Multiply … Fast! The Spread of Orthodox Churches in Italy". Congregations in Europe. Cham: Springer. pp. 53–69. ISBN 9783319772615.
