= Roberto Lagalla =

Mayor of Palermo since 2022

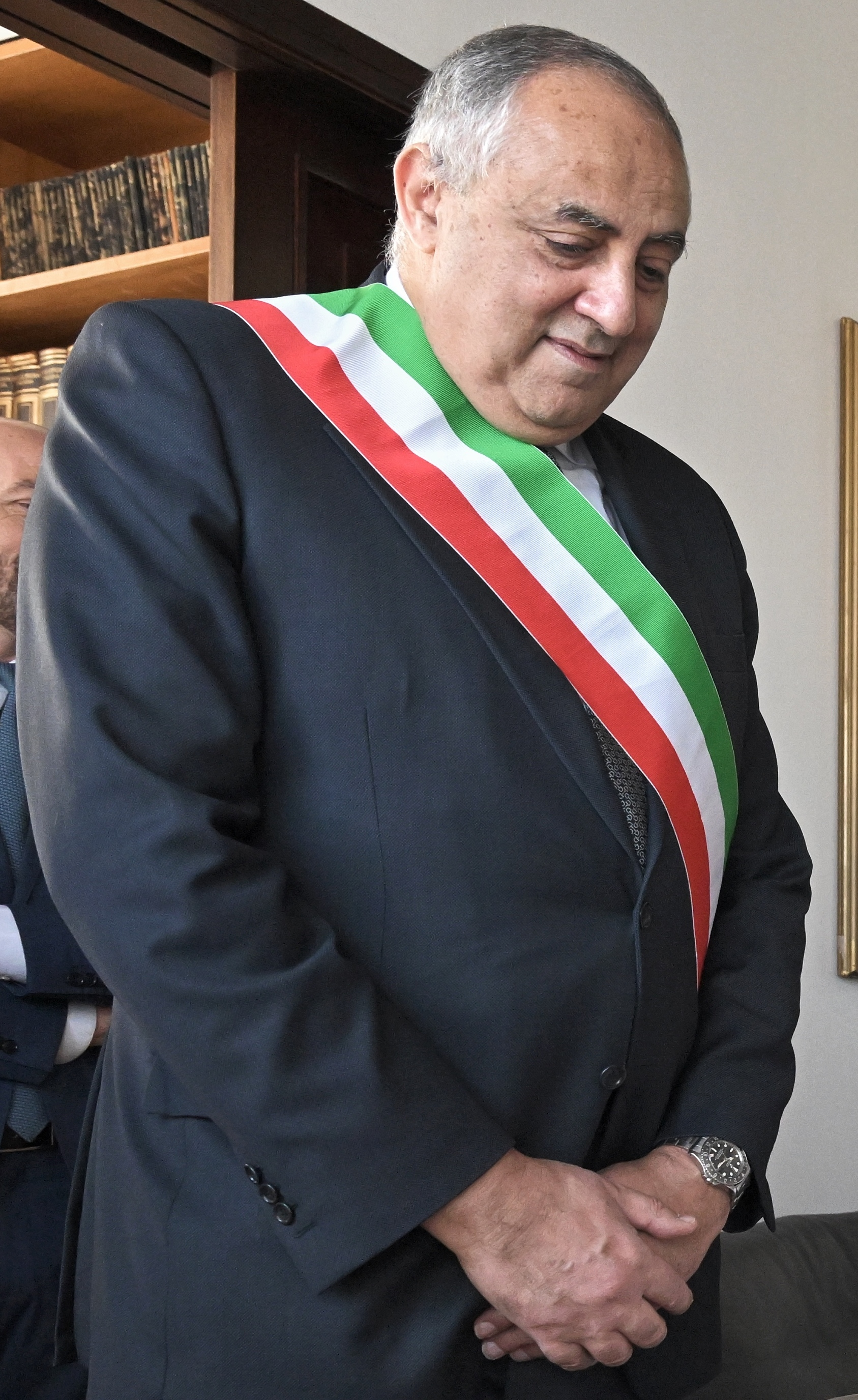
- Lagalla in 2023

Mayor of Palermo
- Incumbent
- Assumed office 20 June 2022
- Preceded by: Leoluca Orlando

Rector of the University of Palermo
- In office 1 November 2008 – 31 October 2015
- Preceded by: Giuseppe Silvestri
- Succeeded by: Fabrizio Micari

Personal details
- Born: 16 April 1955 (age 71) Bari, Apulia, Italy
- Party: Union of the Centre
- Education: University of Palermo
- Occupation: Medic, academic

Roberto Lagalla (born 16 April 1955) is an Italian politician and academic, who has been mayor of Palermo since 2022.

== Biography ==
Born in Bari, at the age of two he moved to Palermo, where he grew up and in 1979 graduated in Medicine and Surgery at the University of Palermo, specializing in diagnostic radiology and oncological radiotherapy. In 1983 he became professor at the University of Palermo in "Diagnostic imaging and radiotherapy". He will later be rector of the same university from 2008 to 2015. In 2006, he was appointed councilor with regional powers for health in the new council led by Salvatore Cuffaro; after Cuffaro's resignation in 2008, he will be forced to abandon the role.

In 2017 he founded the political movement "Idea Sicilia", with which he ran for the regional elections in Sicily that year, in the motion of Nello Musumeci, being elected in the district of Palermo with 8,158 preferences as deputy to the Sicilian Regional Assembly. From 29 November 2017 to 31 March 2022, when he resigned in order to run as mayor of Palermo, he held the position of councilor with regional powers for education and professional training, and, in the meantime, he joined the Union of the Centre.

=== Mayor of Palermo ===
In view of the 2022 local elections, Lagalla officially announces his candidacy for mayor of Palermo, which was supported, following long discussions, by the entire centre-right coalition. He is subsequently elected in the first round with 47.63%.

== Controversies ==
During the electoral campaign for the local elections in Palermo in 2022, some newspapers make public the fact that Lagalla's wife, Maria Paola Ferro, is the niece of Antonio Ferro, prominent boss of the Agrigento mafia, considered the patriarch of a Canicattì clan linked to the Corleonesi. Although Lagalla distanced himself from his wife's family, the spread of this news helped to fuel the controversy according to which he is linked to the mafia world, already fueled by the support given previously to his candidacy by Salvatore Cuffaro, definitively sentenced for personal aiding and abetting towards people belonging to Cosa Nostra, and Marcello Dell'Utri, sentenced to 7 years of imprisonment for external complicity in mafia association.
