= Mercedes Lourdes Frias =

Italian-Dominican politician

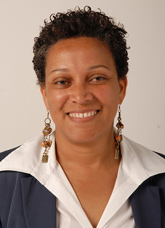

Member of the Italian Chamber of Deputies
- In office April 21, 2006 – April 28, 2008
- Parliamentary group: Communist Refoundation Party
- Constituency: XII District, Tuscany

Personal details
- Born: October 28, 1962 (age 63) Santo Domingo
- Occupation: Politician; Activist

Mercedes Lourdes Frias is an Italian-Dominican politician. She was elected to the Italian Chamber of Deputies in 2006, serving until 2008. She was the first Black woman to be a member of the Italian parliament.

== Life and career ==
Frias was born on October 28, 1962 in Santo Domingo, Dominican Republic. She attended the Universidad Autónoma de Santo Domingo, where she obtained a degree in geography. She worked as a community activist, focusing particularly on issues affecting women and immigrants from Haiti.

In 1990, Frias moved to Prato. There she continued her activist work, eventually becoming an organizer with Italy's Federation of Protestant Churches. She became an Italian citizen in 2004.

Frias was appointed assessor of the city government of Empoli in 2004. In this capacity she was responsible for a portfolio that included the environment, citizenship rights, equal opportunities, and cultural diversity in Empoli.

Frias ran in the 2006 Italian general election for the Chamber of Deputies, affiliated with the Communist Refoundation Party. She was elected in the April 2006 election, to represent the XII District, which is a part of Tuscany. Her election made her the first Black woman to be a member of the Italian parliament. She was also a member of a historically large cohort of Protestants elected to parliament that year. As a deputy she served on the parliamentary committees responsible for constitutional affairs, Schengen implementation, and immigration issues.

For the 2008 Italian general election Frias joined the list La Sinistra l'Arcobaleno (the rainbow left), but she was not re-elected to the parliament.
