= Baptist Evangelical Christian Union of Italy =

Baptist Christian denomination in Italy

- Unione Cristiana Evangelica Battista d'Italia
- Abbreviation: UCEBI
- Classification: Evangelicalism
- Theology: Baptist
- Associations: Federation of Evangelical Churches in Italy, Baptist World Alliance
- Headquarters: Rome, Italy
- Origin: 1956
- Congregations: 116
- Members: 4,100
- Official website: ucebi.it

Baptist Evangelical Christian Union of Italy (Italian: Unione Cristiana Evangelica Battista d'Italia, UCEBI) is a Baptist Christian denomination in Italy. It is affiliated with the Federation of Evangelical Churches in Italy and the Baptist World Alliance. The headquarters is in Rome.

== History ==
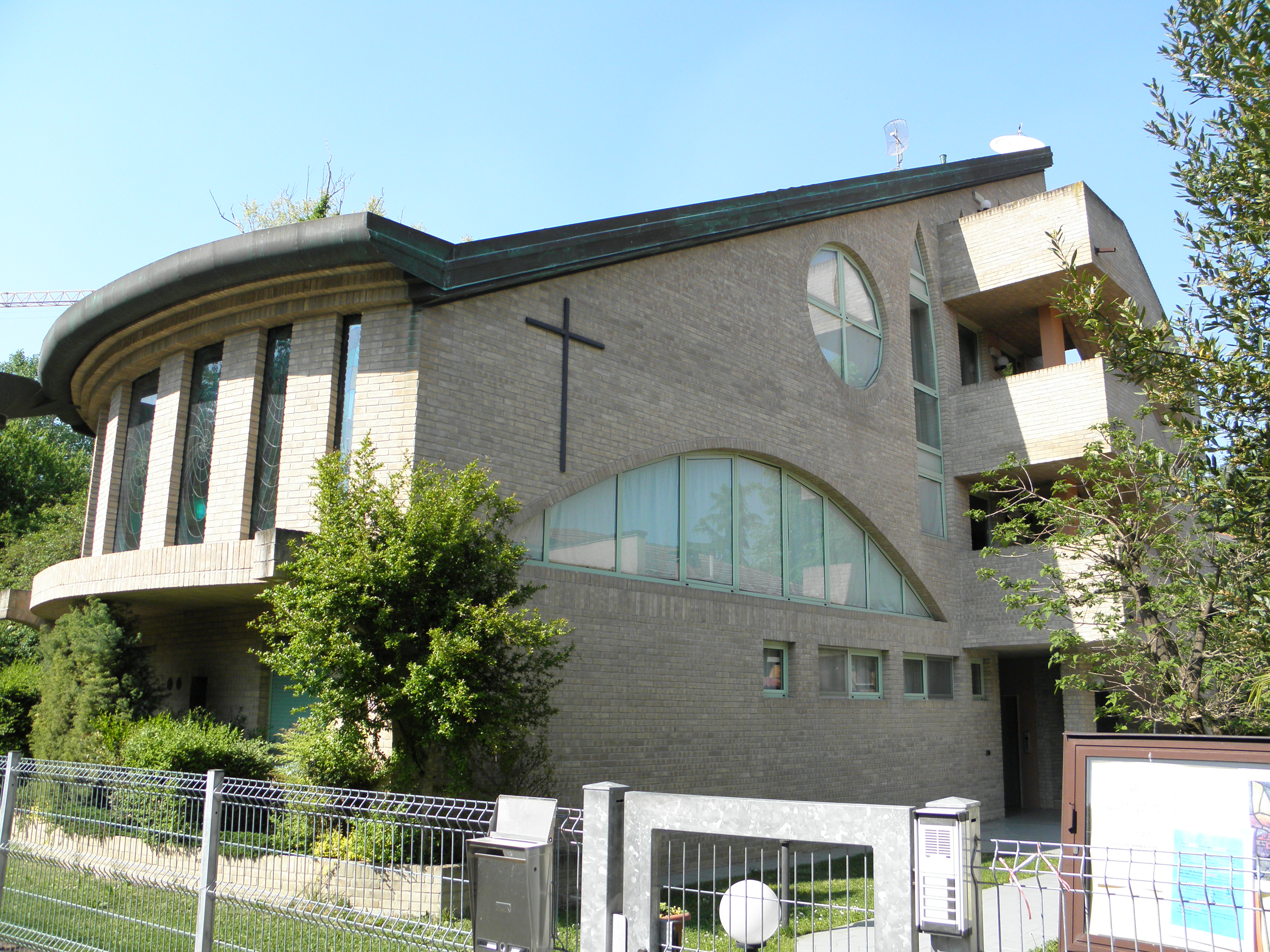
Rovigo Baptist Church.

The Union has its origins in the Apostolic Baptist Christian Union (Unione Cristiana Apostolica Battista), a federation established by a British (BMS World Mission) and American mission (International Mission Board) in 1884. The Baptist Evangelical Christian Union of Italy is officially founded in 1956. In 1966, the churches of the Spezia Mission for Italy merge with the Union. According to a census published by the association in 2023, it claimed 116 churches and 4,100 members.
