= Giuseppe Insalaco =

Italian politician (1941–1988)

Mayor of Palermo
- In office 17 April 1984 – 13 July 1984
- Preceded by: Elda Pucci
- Succeeded by: Stefano Camilleri

Personal details
- Born: 12 October 1941 San Giuseppe Jato, Italy
- Died: 12 January 1988 (aged 46) Palermo, Italy
- Occupation: Politician

Giuseppe Insalaco (12 October 1941 – 12 January 1988) was an Italian politician. He has served as Mayor of Palermo from 17 April 1984 to 13 July 1984.

== Biography ==
Insalaco was born in San Giuseppe Jato on 1941 and died in Palermo on 1988 at the age of 46.

He was shot and killed by the mafia while in the car on 12 January 1988. He was buried in the graveyard of Santa Maria de Guess.

Insalaco is remembered every year on 21 March in the Day of remembrance and commitment of libera.

== See also ==
- List of mayors of Palermo

Political offices
| Preceded by Elda Pucci | Mayor of Palermo; 17 April 1984—13 April 1984 | Succeeded by Stefano Camilleri |
