= Flavia Sparacino =

American-based space maker and scientist

- Born: Italy
- Known for: Pioneering augmented reality, virtual studios, Kinect-like tracking systems and applications, wearable computing, and multi-touch technology.

Academic background
- Education: Phd - Media Arts and Sciences Massachusetts Institute of Technology
- Thesis: Sto(ry)chastics a Bayesian network architecture for combined user modeling, sensor fusion, and computational storytelling for interactive spaces (2003)
- Website: http://sensingplaces.com/

Flavia Sparacino is an American-based space maker and scientist. She is currently CEO/Founder of Sensing Places, a MIT Media Lab spinoff that specializes in immersive space design and technology.

Influenced by MIT Media Lab Professor Alex Pentland and Glorianna Davenport, Sparacino was one of the first people to develop augmented reality, virtual studios, Kinect applications, wearable computing, and multi-touch technology.

== Biography ==
Sparacino was part of the MIT Media Lab from 1994 – 2002 and received her PhD in Media Arts and Sciences at the Massachusetts Institute of Technology in 2002. She also holds Masters in Cognitive Sciences and Media Arts and Sciences, and degrees in Electrical Engineering and Robotics.

MIT granted her 13 technology licenses for her inventions, one of the highest numbers of intellectual property licenses ever awarded to one person. Sparacino holds more than a 1000 academic paper citations for her contribution to entertainment technology and gesture-driven interactive environments.

Italian-born, she was nominated Knight of the Republic of Italy in 2000 for her numerous contributions to innovative communication of art and culture supported by emerging technologies.

Sparacino was awarded the Women in Tech Awards America for Arts in 2023.

== Work ==
Through her company Sensing Places, Sparacino specializes in providing innovation consulting for large companies, business strategies for technology products, customized technology for the next-generation retail stores, showroom architecture and design, and designing futuristic museum exhibits and pavilions.

She is also the founder of two SaaS product companies - Presentize and Beam, which were built to overcome the challenge many businesses face of not being able to share and display content on screens quickly and easily.

Her background covers ambient and body sensors, statistical mathematical models, interactive multimedia, and 3D graphics. Her work on gesture recognition and body-driven dance, music, and gaming applications came 12 years before the launch of Microsoft Kinect and 5 years before Spielberg's Minority Report movie was released, as documented by the Discovery Channel feature on her work. Sparacino built wearable computers and sensors for use in museums and performance spaces almost 10 years before the launch of Google Glass.

Sparacino designed museum installations for MOMA, SFMOMA, the National Library of Medicine, Milan's La Scala Opera theater, the National Museum of American Jewish History, and the MIHL (Museo Interactivo de la Historia de Lugo). She designed interactive spaces for Gehry Partners, Zaha Hadid Architects, the FX Luxury Developers Group in Las Vegas, and the governments of Dubai and Qatar. She designed Vodafone Italy's headquarter showroom inclusive of visitor and content management software and interactive installations.

Sparacino was cited by Anna Italian Magazine as "one of the leading Italian women scientists' who are following along the footsteps of Nobel Prize Winner, Rita Levi-Montalcini, for her work that connects art and culture."

She is a regular speaker and panelist at conferences including American Alliance of Museums, SEDG, and Los Angeles Idea Project and has had her work featured in The Boston Globe, The New York Times, The Wall Street Journal, and the Discovery Channel.

== Projects and inventions ==
=== Early work ===
Sparacino released a thesis in 2003 on Sto(ry)chastics: A Bayesian Network Architecture for User Modeling and Computational Storytelling for Interactive Spaces. Her work was guided by understanding people's preferences in an unobtrusive manner so as to present them only with relevant information at the right time.

In 2000, she created the first museum wearable which used real-time sensor-driven technology to create a personalized augmented reality experience for the visitor. Later that year she developed interactive space software architecture for dance, theater, and museum exhibits which was used in conjunction with real-time computer-vision-based body tracking and gesture recognition techniques to choreograph digital media together with human performers or museum visitors.

Her Narrative Spaces: bridging architecture and entertainment via interactive technology project in 2002 described technological platforms built at the MIT Media Lab, through 1994-2002, that contribute to defining new trends in architecture that merge virtual and real spaces, and are reshaping.

In 2004 Sparacino created Scenographies of the past and museums of the future: from the wunderkammer to body-driven interactive narrative spaces. This project included numerous innovative technological solutions adopted for the exhibit: "Puccini Set Designer" organized with the support and collaboration of Milan's renown La Scala opera theater.

In 2005 her Museum Intelligence: Using Interactive Technologies for Effective Communication and Storytelling project developed a series of high-end interactive technologies designed to support the communication needs and strategies of the Puccini Set Designer museum exhibit.

=== Recent work ===
In 2010 Sparacino worked on the Museo Interactivo de la Historia de Lugo project in Galicia, Spain. Her design showcased the latest sensing technologies that allow visitors to engage with the stories on display through immersive embodied interactions. She designed a highly theatrical space in which technology animates historical characters and places to foster playful learning driven by the public's own spontaneous curiosity and engagement.

Sparacino collaborated with Zaha Hadid Architects in 2011 on the National Art Museum of China project (NAMOC). Inspired by the ancient Chinese art of calligraphy, her contribution involved designing large-scale interactive projections that transformed the museum floor into beautifully rendered calligraphic brushstrokes that guided visitors through the exhibits. A mobile application was also created to conduct customized tours based on a visitor's preferences.

In 2012 she worked with KR Architects to create the winning bid for the Museum of Contemporary Architecture (MoCA) in Hangzhou, China. In this project Sparacino designed a reconfigurable street using two parallel screens up to six meters high and concealed projectors to reproduce the experience of walking in a major city.

In 2013 Sparacino worked with Vodafone Italy to design, engineer, and develop software for an invite-only 10,000 sq feet interactive showroom to creatively unveil new enterprise products to CEOs, high-level executives, city officials, and journalists. The showroom articulated the experience through eight different interactive environments controlled by a dedicated software running on a tablet. Her custom mobile user interface and back-end server software allowed for easy content management and controls of all screens, audio, and lighting levels in all areas of the showroom.
