= Niccolò Rinaldi =

Italian politician

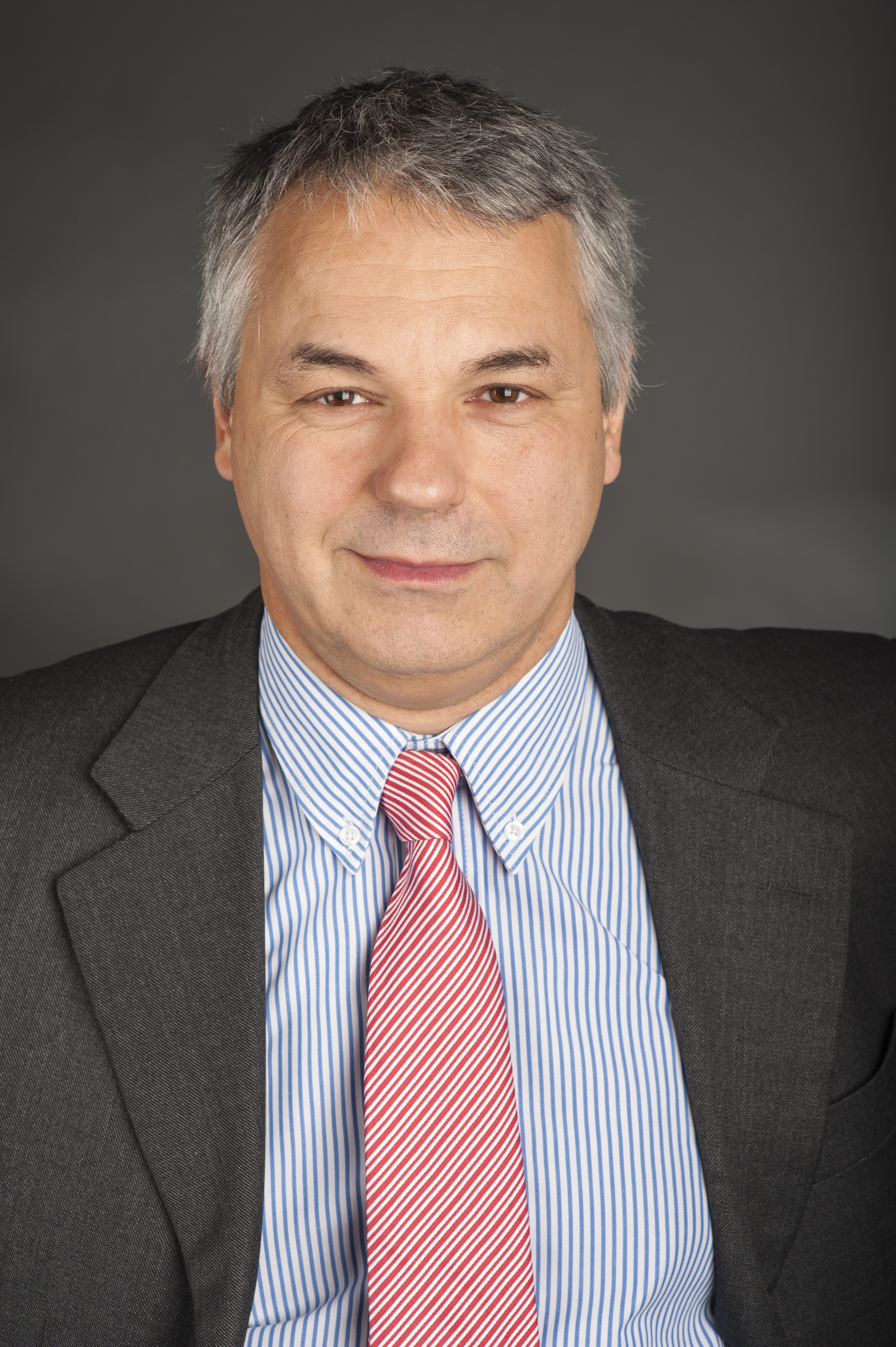
- Niccolò Rinaldi

Vice President of the Alliance of Liberals and Democrats for Europe Group
- In office 2009–2014

Personal details
- Born: 3 December 1962 (age 63) Florence, Italy
- Party: Italia dei Valori / ELDR
- Occupation: Politician
- Website: http://www.niccolorinaldi.it

Niccolò Rinaldi (Florence, 3 December 1962) is an Italian politician, writer and alpinist.

== Career ==
Born in Florence in 1962, he graduated in Political Science with a thesis on the street economy of Dakar, the result of field research in Senegal. Since 1989, he has been the UN Information Officer in Afghanistan, living between Peshawar, Kabul, and the rest of the country. In 1991, he left the United Nations to join the European Parliament as a foreign policy adviser, focusing primarily on Africa and Central Asia. In 2000, he served as Deputy Secretary General of the ALDE Group in the Parliament. In 2009, he was elected to the European Parliament and, upon his term, resumed his role as an EU official, taking on the role of Head of the Asia-Pacific Unit and Desk Officer for Afghanistan and Central Asia. A journalist since 1982, he has published, among others, on La Voce Repubblicana, L’Espresso, and, from 2013 to 2022, on the Huffington Post. He writes regularly for Critica Liberale (where he is a member of the editorial board of the periodical Non Mollare) and for the Ugo La Malfa Foundation, for Solidarietà Internazionale, and for the journal of the Italian Geographic Society, of which he is also a member of the scientific committee. Having visited almost every country in the world, he maintains a blog on theory of travelling on Rewriters. In 2024, 2025, and 2026, he was invited to speak at the United Nations in New York on the impact of artificial intelligence on small Pacific States, and has written about it for the Society & Diplomatic Review. He is a member of the Oxus Society for Central Asian Affairs.

He is the author of numerous books, primarily on Afghanistan, Africa, Florence, and the Holocaust. Night in Gaza is a collection of notes from his numerous missions in the Strip, also presented to the Italian Chamber of Deputies, while "Shoah, Rwanda, Two Parallel Lessons" is a comparison of the two genocides, also presented to the parliament in Kigali and in Italy by the Einaudi Foundation with the participation of the Israeli ambassador. He participates in Holocaust Remembrance Days as an expert and author of books on collective memory.

In Giro del mondo in cinquanta barbieri (Around the World in Fifty Barbershops), he writes about his habit of cutting his hair in a different country each time.

Since 2024, he has been the editor of the weekly program Aria del continente on Radio Radicale, dedicated to Europe.

Passionate about theater and having appeared as an actor or narrator in concerts, he is a theater critic for La Ragione.

A mountaineer, he has climbed the main 4,000-meter peaks in the Alps, as well as various classic peaks in the Dolomites and Africa. He is a member of the Tuscan ski rescue team. His book, L'alternativa montagna, is a reflection on the relationship between our society and the mountains, considered geographical, cultural, and spiritual. He is a member of the Waldensian Church, whose historical relationship with the Alps he wrote about in his book, L'alternativa montagna. He married in 1999, has three children, and was widowed in 2019.

== Political Activity ==
With a republican and federalist background, he was elected to the European Parliament in 2009 as an independent with the Italy of Values party. He became vice president of the ALDE group, the third largest group in Parliament, and head of the IdV delegation. He attended 100% of the plenary sessions during his term and was a member of the committees for international trade and human rights, as well as the Steering Committee of the World Trade Organization. He was a member of the delegations for relations with Palestine, Central Asia, Afghanistan, South Asia, and, as an alternate, of the African, Caribbean, and Pacific Parliamentary Assembly. He was rapporteur for the EU-Malaysia Free Trade Agreement, the EU-India Free Trade Agreement, a major regulation to protect the Union's rights in trade disputes with third countries (which reduced the European response time from two years to about two months), a regulation on direct trade for the Northern part of Cyprus, and a report on trade policy measures to support young Arab democracies.

Niccolò Rinaldi has been committed to promoting awareness of European funds and how to access them, creating a detailed newsletter on open calls for proposals, organizing over forty free training courses in European project planning, and publishing a manual. A mountaineer, he was a facilitator of the European Parliament's Mountain Intergroup and has promoted various initiatives to integrate mountain aspects into EU regional policies and to promote European identity through mountain culture and geography. He also dealt with the territorial dispute between Italy and France on the summit of Mont Blanc.

He was co-president of the intergroup for Access to Medicine, and active in supporting the most vulnerable groups, such as the disabled, the homeless, and Roma, and in collective memory, in which he has previously curated multimedia installations on the themes of siege in new wars (Piazza di guerra, 2003), the Holocaust (Anatomy of a Genocide, inside the monumental synagogue of Florence, 2006), and the Rwandan genocide (Silence for Rwanda, 2004).

After his time as a Member of the European Parliament (MEP), reaffirming his stance on the democratic and activist left, he became a member of the National Executive of the Italian Republican Party in 2015. He ran again for the European Parliament in the Central Italy constituency in 2014 as one of the top candidates for European Choice and in 2019 as one of the top candidates for Più Europa. In both cases, despite his personal results in terms of individual preferential votes, the list failed to reach a quorum.

Since 2020, he has been President of the Movimento Repubblicani Europei (European Republican Movement), for which he ran for the Senate in 2022 on the Italia Democratica e Progressista (Democratic and Progressive Italy) list in the Emilia-Romagna 1 constituency, but was unsuccessful. In January 2026, he delivered a policy report on Europe at the second assembly of Officina Repubblicana.

A member since 1996, he is a member of the board of directors of the Nonviolent, Transnational and Transparty Radical Party, on whose behalf he participates in debates and broadcasts on Radio Radicale.

== Publications ==
Islam, guerra e dintorni. Viaggio in Afghanistan (Islam, War and Surroundings), foreword by Jas Gawronski, L'Harmattan Italia, 1997; French version Dieu, guerre et autres paysages, foreword by Daniel Cohn-Bendit, L´Harmanattan, 2000

Droga di Dio. Afghanistan: la società dei credenti (God's Drug. Afghanistan: a Society of Believers); L'Ancora del Mediterraneo, 2002

L'invenzione dell'Africa. Un viaggio, un dizionario (The Invention of Africa. A Journey, a Dictionary), foreword by Walter Veltroni; La Meridiana, 2005

Piccola anatomia di un genocidio - Auschwitz e oltre (Short Anatomy of a Genocide - Auschwitz and Beyond); Giuntina, 2009

Secret Florence; Jonglez, 2011-2026 (original versione in Italian and translated also in French, German and Spanish)

Oceano Arno - i Navigatori fiorentini (Arno Ocean, the Floretine Sailors), foreword by Massimo Ruffilli and notes by Mauro Marrani and Maurizio Maggini; Firenze Libri, 2012

Shoah e Ruanda, due lezioni parallele (Shoah, Rwanda, Two Parallel Lessons); Giuntina, 2014 Notte a Gaza (Night in Gaza), Festina Lente, 2014; Stampa Alternativa, 2015

Il giro del mondo in cinquanta barbieri - storie minori ma non troppo (Around the World in Fifty Barbershops - Minor but Not So Minor Stories); Stampa Alternativa, 2015

Tappeti volanti - cinque storie fiorentine in Afghanistan (Flying Carpets - Five Florentine Stories in Afghanistan); Stampa Alternativa, 2020

Alfabeto d’identità – scoprire Firenze (An Alphabet of Identity - Discovering Florence), foreword by Cosimo Ceccuti and Anna Balzani; Mauro Pagliai editore, 2022

L'alternativa montagna (The Mountain Alternative); Festina Lente, 2014, I libri di Mompracem, 2024

== See also ==
- European Parliament
- Italia dei Valori
