= Manuel Arturo Claps =

Argentine-Uruguayan writer

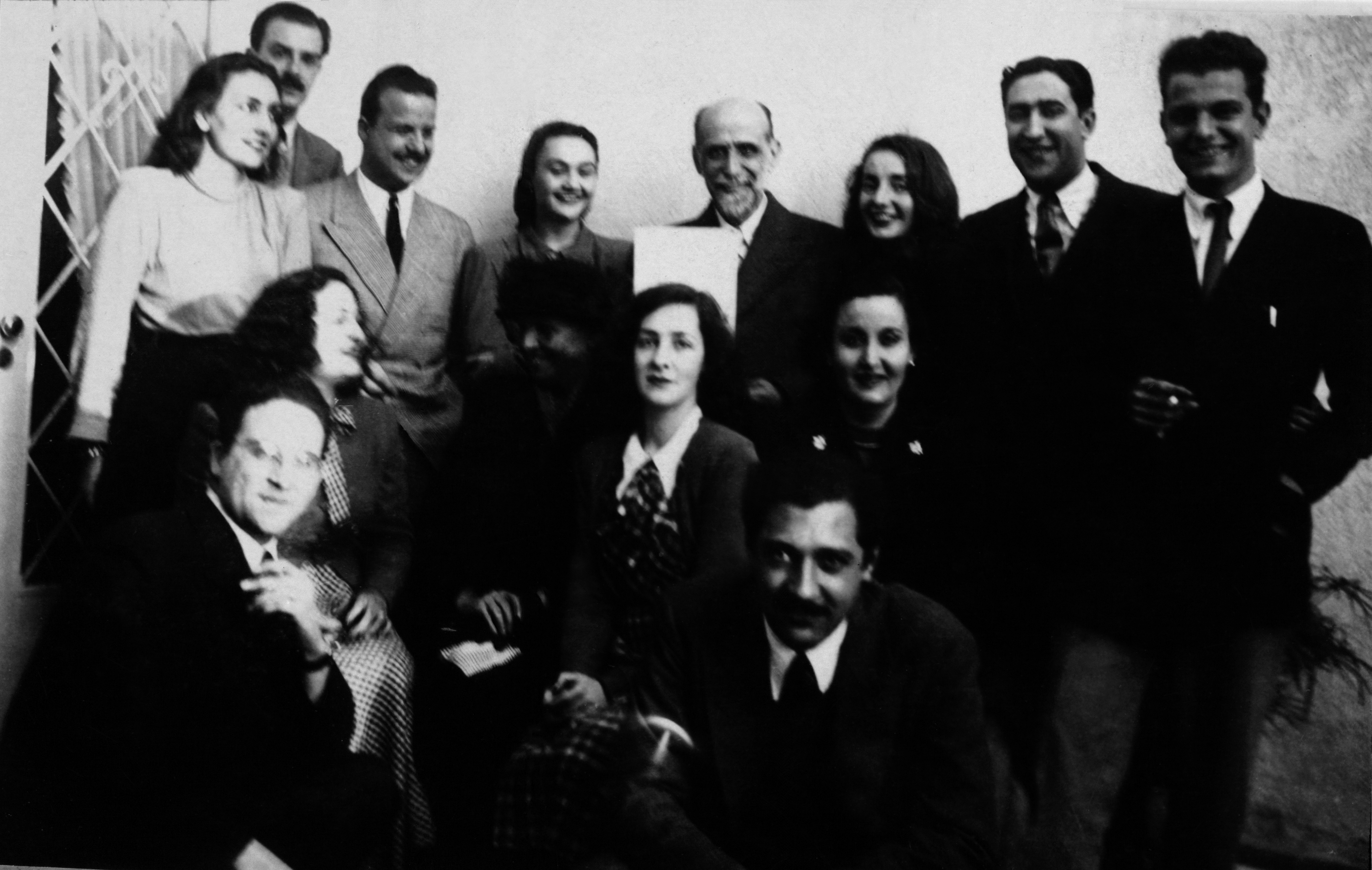
Manuel Arturo Claps (standing, second to the left) and other fellows from the Generation '45 receiving Juan Ramón Jiménez.

Manuel Arturo Claps (Buenos Aires, June 7, 1920 – Montevideo, May 23, 1999) was an Argentine-Uruguayan writer.

Born in Argentina, due to political reasons his family had to go in exile; they settled in Montevideo, where afterwards Claps joined the Generation of 45, a Uruguayan intellectual and literary movement: Carlos Maggi, Ángel Rama, Emir Rodríguez Monegal, Idea Vilariño, Carlos Real de Azúa, Carlos Martínez Moreno, Mario Arregui, Mauricio Muller, José Pedro Díaz, Amanda Berenguer, Tola Invernizzi, Mario Benedetti, Ida Vitale, Líber Falco, Juan Cunha, Juan Carlos Onetti, among others.

== Obra ==
- Vaz Ferreira: notas para un estudio (Número. 1950)
- Yrigoyen (Biblioteca de Marcha. 1971)
- José Batlle y Ordóñez (with Mario Daniel Lamas. Ediciones de la Casa del Estudiante. 1979)
- El batllismo como ideología (with Mario Daniel Lamas. 1999)
