= Culture of Uruguay =

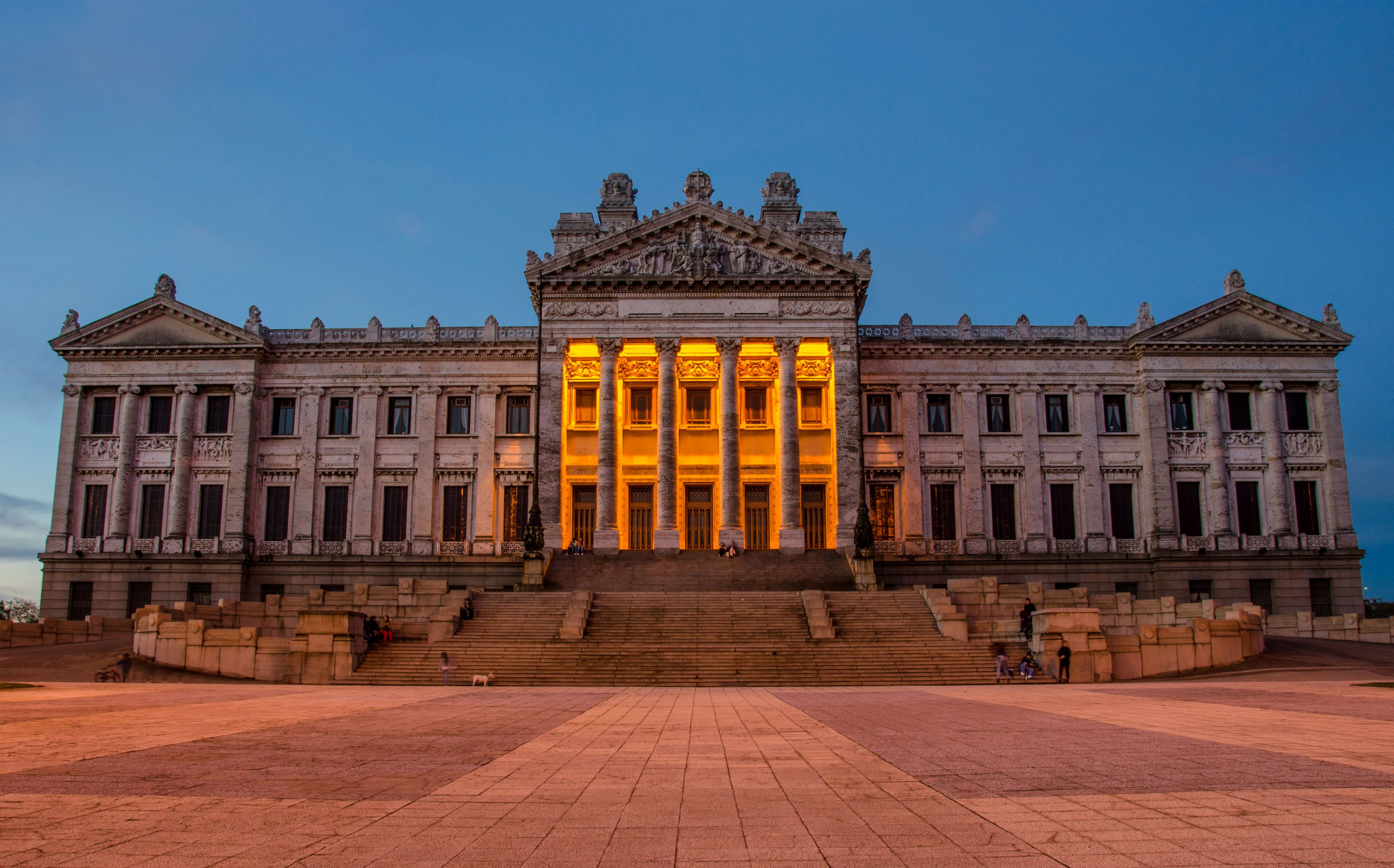
The Legislative Palace of Uruguay.

The culture of Uruguay is diverse since the nation's population is one of multicultural origins. Modern Uruguayan culture and lifestyle are heavily influenced by European traditions, due to the contributions of large numbers of immigrants who arrived in the country from the 19th century onwards, especially from Italy and Spain.

From the year 1858 to 1950 large waves of European immigrants began arriving to Uruguay, with the majority of the immigrants coming from Italy. Minor European immigrant groups – French, Germans, Swiss, Russians, Jews, and Armenians, among others – also migrated to Uruguay. Uruguay has century-old remains and fortresses of the colonial era. Its cities have a rich architectural heritage, and a number of writers, artists, and musicians. Carnaval and candombe are the most important examples of African influence by slaves, as well as Umbanda religious beliefs and practices. Guarani traditions can be seen in the national drink, mate.

== Visual arts ==
=== Painting and sculpture ===
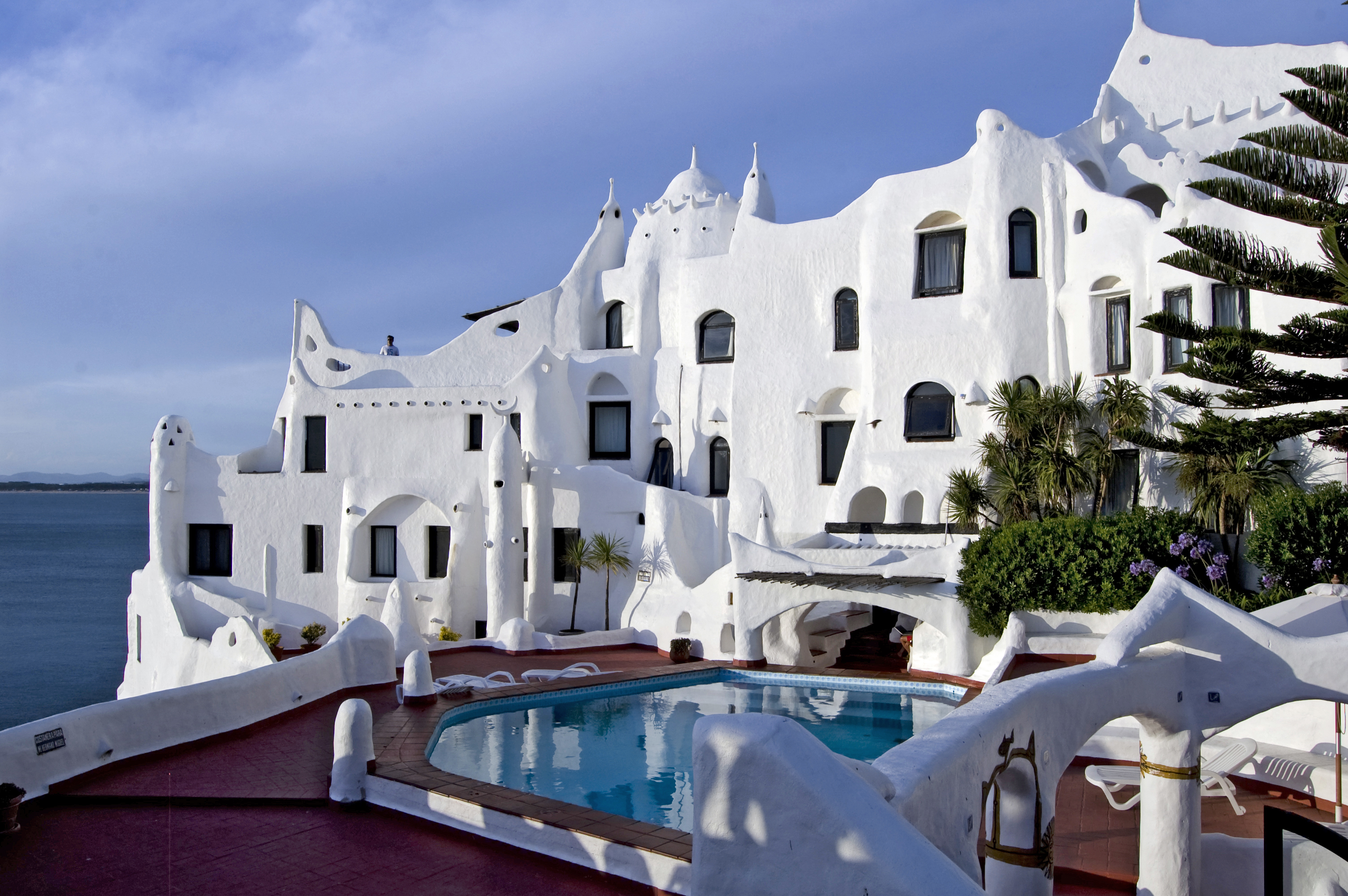
The Casapueblo, one of Carlos Páez Vilaró most famous art piece

Well-known Uruguayan painters include realists such as Juan Manuel Blanes, constructivists such as Joaquín Torres García, nativists like Carlos María Herrera, post-impressionists such as Pedro Figari and Felipe Seade, abstract artists such as Carlos Páez Vilaró, and numerous others.

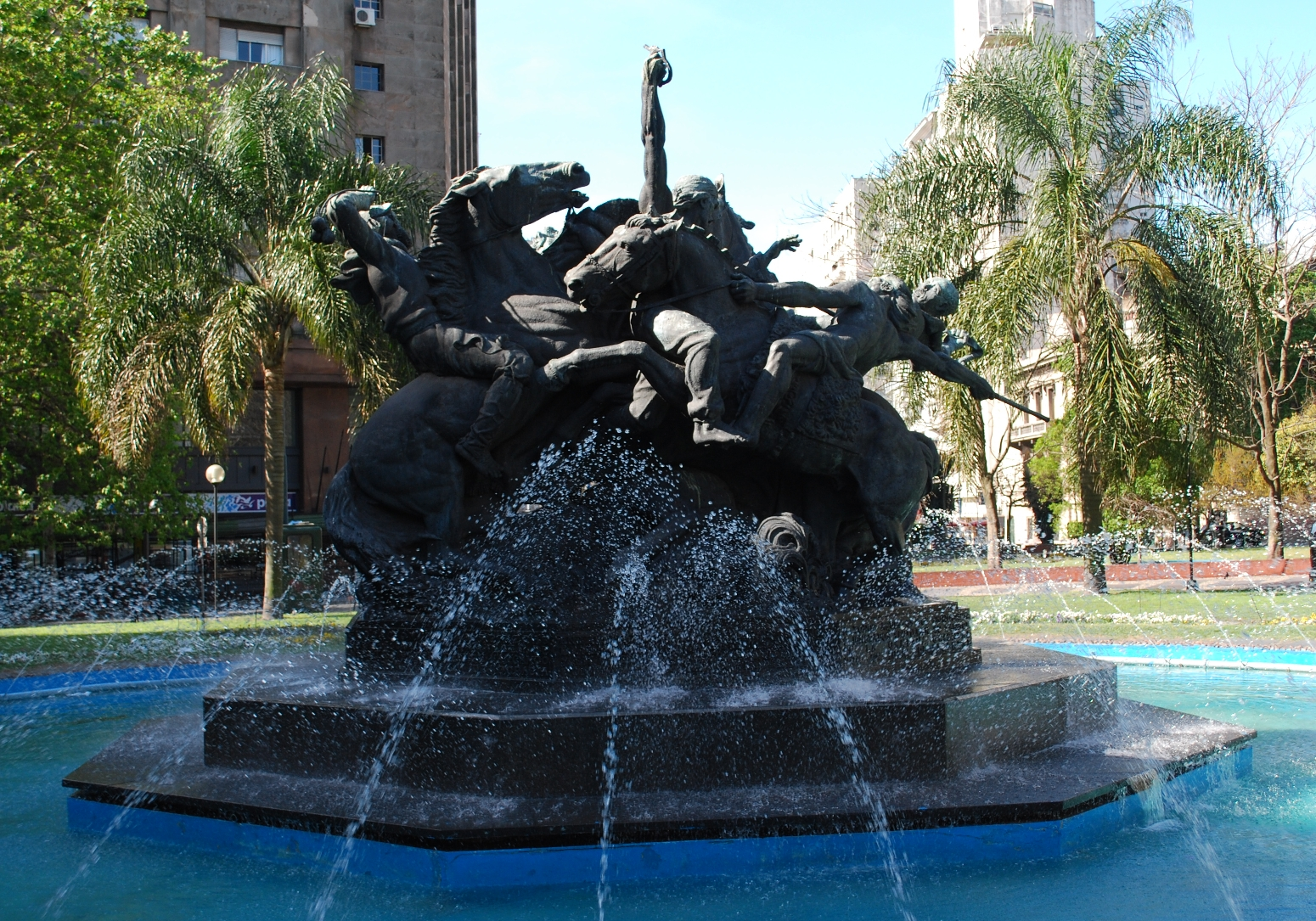
José Belloni: The Struggle, 1965

Well-known sculptors include realists Pablo Atchugarry, José Belloni, and José Luis Zorrilla de San Martín, as well as contemporary sculptors such as Juan José Calandria, Águeda Dicancro, Hugo Nantes, Claudio Silveira Silva, Mariví Ugolino, and Carlos Páez Vilaró, who created an internationally renowned "livable sculpture", Casapueblo.

=== Architecture ===
Due to European migration, new forms of art and design started to enter during the formation of Uruguay. Many buildings in Uruguay are European influenced, for example, the Palacio Salvo was designed by Italian architect Mario Palanti.

Many well recognized architects around the world are Uruguayan. Some famous Uruguayan architects include Juan Antonio Scasso, Juan Giuria, Leopoldo Artucio, Eladio Dieste, and Carlos Ott.

Rafael Viñoly is a Uruguayan architect known for his most recognized project being the 432 Park Avenue in New York City. The building stands at 1,396 feet (425.5 m) with 96 floors, making it the tallest residential building in the world. He is also credited for designing other buildings such as the Tokyo International Forum, Kimmel Center for the Performing Arts, and Uruguay's international airport Carrasco International Airport.

== Modern society ==
=== Immigration ===
Among the several peoples who settled Uruguay and formed the backbone of its society must be highlighted Spaniards and Italians, together with some descendants of African slaves. While Spaniards being the greatest contributor to other South American countries, Italians are arguably the greatest contributor to Uruguay. There are also significant minorities: Armenians, Austrians, Basque, Britons, Bulgarians, Croats, French, Germans, Greeks, Roma, Hungarians, Irish, Scots, Jews, Lebanese, Lithuanians, Poles, Russians, Slovaks, Slovenes, Swiss, and Ukrainians. There are very small Asian communities, mainly from China, Japan and Korea.

=== Languages ===
Spanish is the de facto national language, and is virtually spoken by the entire population. The standard language is Uruguayan Spanish, which is a variant of Rioplatense Spanish. This variant is known in the Hispanosphere for its marked Italian influence in its intonation and vocabulary. Additionally, lunfardo argot is widely used among the population.

The Uruguayan Portuguese or fronteiriço—a set of varieties of Portuguese—are spoken in the northeast of the country, where cultural exchanges occur between communities on both sides of the border. Minority languages in Uruguay include Italian, French, German, Hebrew, and other European languages, which are present in the country due to the significant waves of migration from Europe. English is the most widespread foreign language among the Uruguayan people.

Since 2001, Uruguayan Sign Language is an official language.

=== Gestures ===
Uruguayan gestures are mostly adopted from Southern European culture, with hand gestures and tones being all used commonly throughout the country. A gesture that is only specifically used in Argentina and Uruguay is males kissing other males on the cheek, sometimes both cheeks, as a way of greeting. For the rest of Latin America, kissing on cheek as a form of greeting is mostly towards a male and female, or a female to another female.

== Popular culture ==
=== Humour ===
During the civic-military dictatorship, satirical magazines such as El dedo and Guambia were notable vehicles for expressing dissatisfaction.

Orlando Petinatti leads the radio programme Malos Pensamientos.

=== Music ===
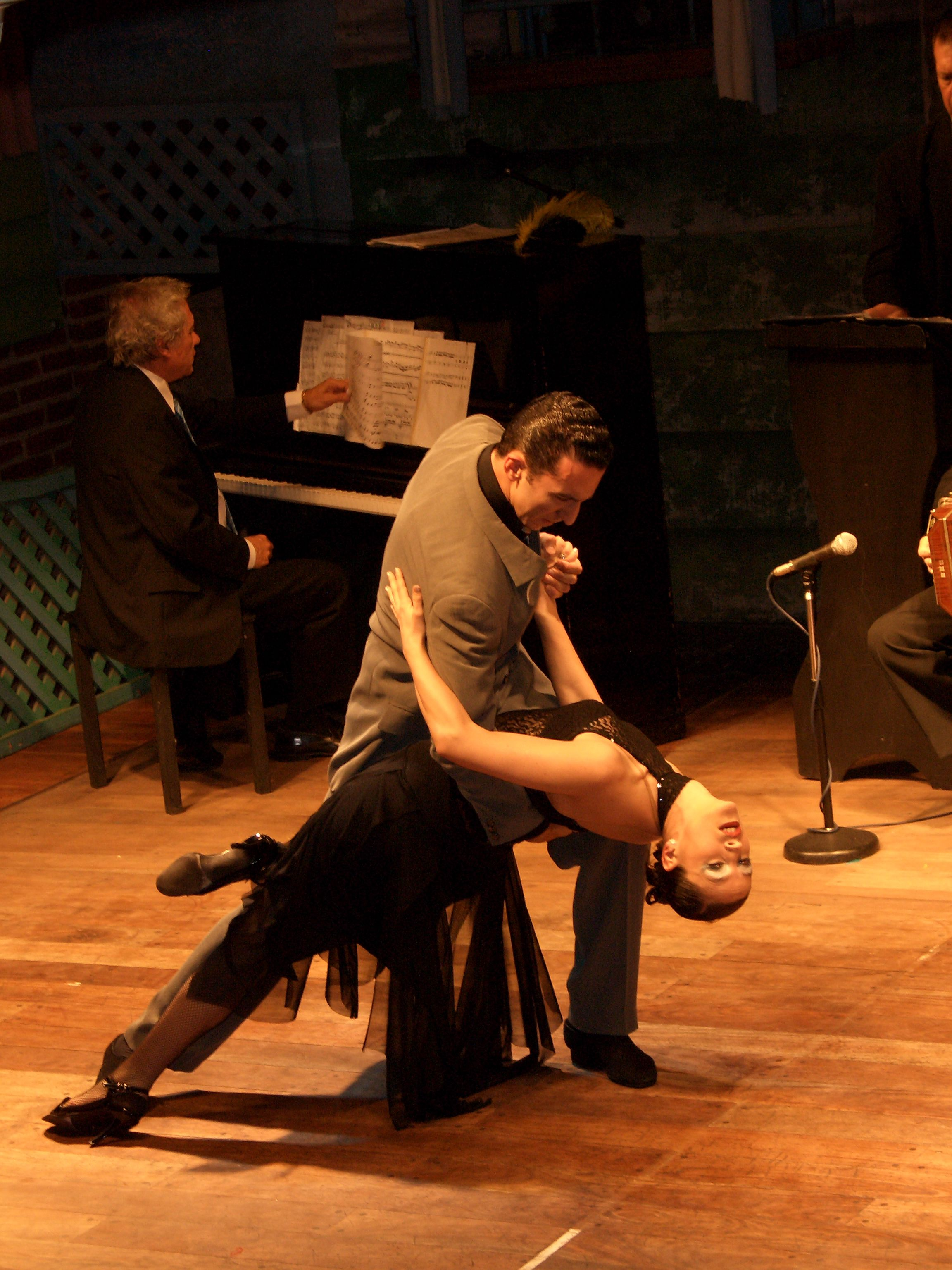
The Tango, which originated in the areas of Argentina and Uruguay

Uruguayans enjoy music such as tango, folk, and waltz as well as local forms such as candombe, milonga and murga. Both tango and candombe have been recognized by UNESCO as Intangible Cultural Heritage of Humanity. Uruguay's annual Carnival is a major event with many unique features distinguishing it from those of its neighbours. Rock, jazz, pop and other international genres also enjoy great popularity in Uruguay.

=== Motion pictures ===
The first Uruguayan motion picture is "Carrera de bicicletas en el velódromo de Arroyo Seco". The film was directed by Félix Oliver, the pioneer of cinematography in Uruguay. The best reviewed Uruguayan movie is the 2004 film, Whisky. Directed by Juan Pablo Rebella and Pablo Stoll, with a starring cast of Andrés Pazos, Mirella Pascual, and Jorge Bolani, it was well-received by film critics.

=== Smoking ===
Roughly 1/3 of Uruguayan adults smoke tobacco, according to Uruguayan research groups. On March 1, 2006, a law went into effect banning smoking in all enclosed public spaces in Uruguay, including restaurants and bars, among the toughest smoking bans worldwide and the strictest in Latin America. The penalty for businesses that allow smoking is a fine of roughly US $1,100 or a three-day closure. One opinion poll found that 70% of smokers supported the ban. Current President of Uruguay in that year, Tabaré Vázquez, was a medic doctor specializing in cancer treatment.

== Literature ==
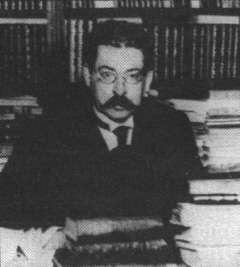
José Enrique Rodó

One of Uruguay's most famous works of literature is Ariel by José Enrique Rodó (1871–1917). Written in 1900, the book deals with the need to maintain spiritual values while pursuing material and technical progress. Florencio Sánchez (1875–1910) wrote plays about social problems that are still performed today. Juan Zorrilla de San Martín (1855–1931) wrote epic poems about Uruguayan history (notably Tabaré). Juana de Ibarbourou (1892–1979) and Delmira Agustini (1886–1914) were also notable poets.

The Generación del 45 (Generation of '45) were of group of writers, mainly from Uruguay, who were famously known to have an influence on literature and culture of the region. Well-known writers belonged to this group such as Mario Benedetti, Amanda Berenguer, Juan Carlos Onetti, Mauricio Müller, Humberto Megget, Armonía Somers, Idea Vilariño, Emir Rodríguez Monegal, Carlos Maggi, Zenobia Camprubí and among others.

== Religion ==
Since 1919, church and state have been separated, and the constitution, as revised in 1966, guarantees religious freedom. The largest religion in Uruguay are the Roman Catholics, making about 66% of the population. Most Uruguayans baptize their children and marry in churches, but don't attend church that often. There is an estimated amount of 20,000 Jews in Uruguay, making it one of the largest Jewish communities in South America and in the world. Most Jews in Uruguay are Sephardi Jews, followed by Ashkenazim, Mizrahim, and Italkim. During European migration to South America, many German Jews and Italian Jews migrated to Uruguay. There are also several Evangelical Protestant groups, making 2% of the Uruguayan population. Macumba and Umbanda, religions of Afro-Brazilian origin, are currently the fastest-growing religions in Uruguay. There are a few Christian missionary organizations in Uruguay, such as Serve the City (Run by Matthew Daniels). There is also a number of Jehovah's Witnesses, with 11,825 publishers and 156 congregations located within the country.

== Cuisine ==
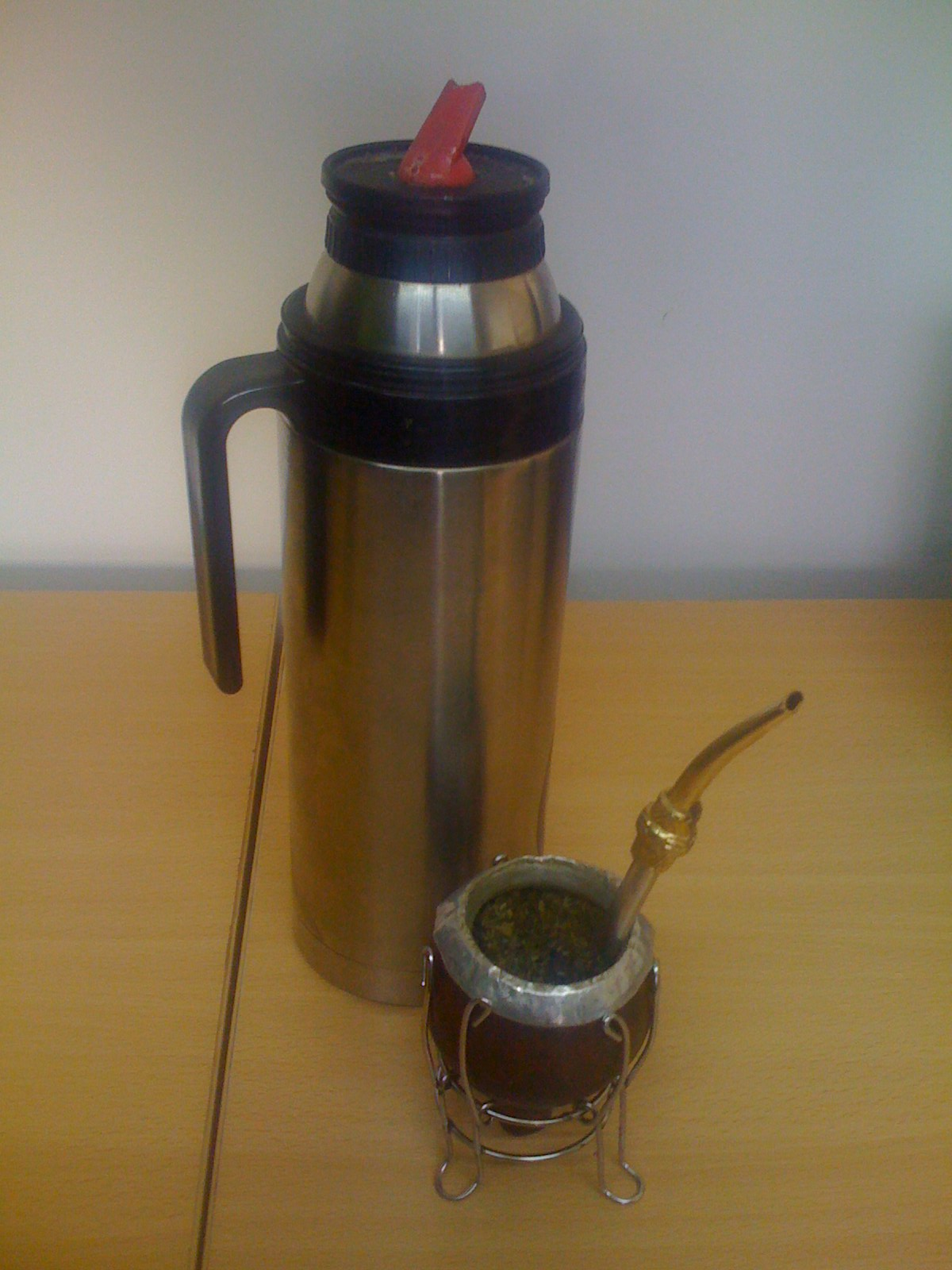
The invigorating yerba mate in its gourd with thermos. It is a fixture in Uruguayan daily life.

Uruguayans consume a large amount of beef, primarily at gatherings known in the continent as the asado. The parrillada (beef platter), chivito (a substantial steak sandwich), and pasta are the national dishes. Uruguayan cuisine is greatly influenced by Italian cuisine, due to the large number of immigrants who arrived in the country in the 19th and 20th centuries.

Other Uruguayan dishes include morcilla dulce (a type of blood sausage cooked with ground orange fruit, orange peel, and walnuts) and milanesa (a veal breaded cutlet similar to the German Wienerschnitzel). Snacks include olímpicos (club sandwiches), húngaras (spicy sausage in a hot dog roll), and masas surtidas (bite-sized pastries). Typical drinks include mate, tea, clericó (a mixture of white wine and fruit juice), and medio y medio (part sparkling wine and part white wine).

=== Wine ===
Plantings of Tannat (also known in Uruguay as Harriague) have been increasing in Uruguay each year as that country's wine industry develops, and the country is considered the second most notable Tannat region after Madiran, France. The Tannat wines produced here are characterized by more elegant and softer tannins and blackberry fruit notes. Vineyards in Uruguay have begun to distinguish between the "old vines" that are descendants from the original cuttings brought over from Europe and the new clones being produced today. The newer vines tend to produce more powerful wines with a higher alcohol level, but less acidity and complex fruit characteristics. Some wineries utilize both vines to make blends. Now the wines typically spend about 20 months in oak prior to release. Today it is often blended with Pinot noir and Merlot, and is made in a variety of styles including those reminiscent of Port and Beaujolais.

== Sports ==
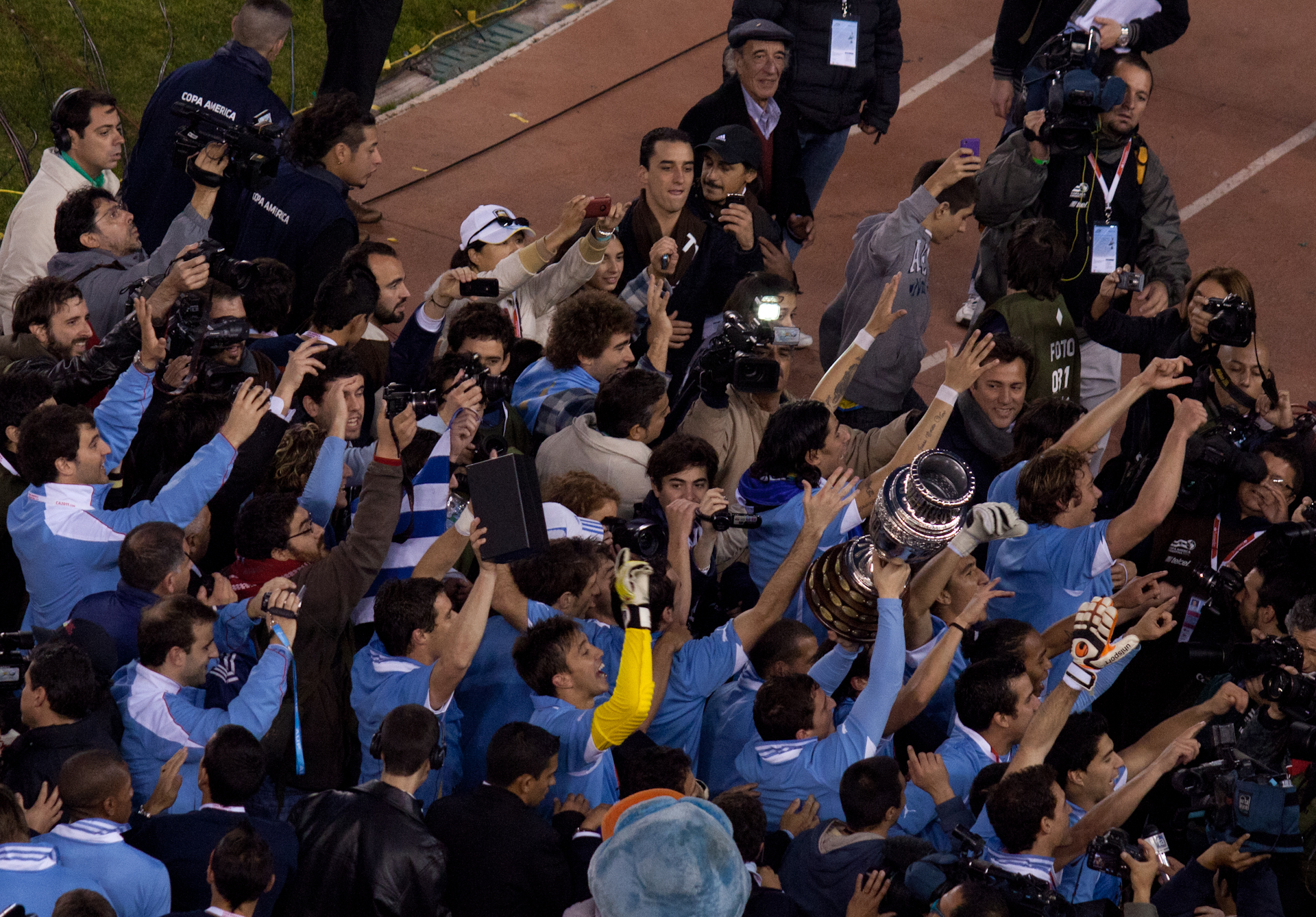
The Uruguay National Football Team winning the 2011 edition of the Copa America, hosted by Argentina

Sports in Uruguay have been a key element to the culture since the nation's independence.

Football (Spanish: fútbol) is the most popular sport in Uruguay. Uruguay has won an Olympic gold medal in 1924, and another one in 1928, which were considered the most important tournaments in football, before the FIFA World Cup began in 1930, hence the four stars on the Uruguayan jersey. The first World Cup, which Uruguay won, was held in 1930 in Montevideo. The Estadio Centenario was built for the World Cup, and serves to this day as the country's main football stadium.

Uruguay also won the World Cup in 1950, beating Brazil in Rio de Janeiro at the Estádio do Maracanã. The event has had astounding impacts on the history of the sport, due to Brazil being a heavily favoured team at that time, and is also known as the Maracanazo.

Uruguay has the second most Copa América titles, the most important football tournament in the South American region. Uruguay currently has 15 titles to their name, the most recent being the 2011 Copa América hosted by Argentina.

Uruguay has two major clubs, Peñarol and Club Nacional de Football, which both have won major tournaments both nationally and internationally. Peñarol has won the Uruguayan Primera División a total of 49 times, while Nacional have won the division 46 times. Peñarol has won the Copa Libertadores, the most prestigious club tournament in South America, 5 times and Nacional have won 3 times. Both teams have won the Intercontinental Cup a total of 3 times (which is the present day FIFA Club World Cup). In September 2009, Peñarol was chosen as the South American Club of the Century by the IFFHS.

Uruguayans are internationally known in the football world and have produced some of the biggest names of the sport. Some names include:

- Enzo Francescoli
- Juan Alberto Schiaffino
- Hector Scarone
- Diego Forlán
- Luis Suárez
- Álvaro Recoba
- Jose Nasazzi
- Diego Godín
- Edinson Cavani
- Diego Lugano
- Alcides Ghiggia
- Antonio Pacheco D'Agosti
- Ladislao Mazurkiewicz
- Paolo Montero

Other popular sports in Uruguay include athletics, auto racing, basketball, boxing, cycling, field hockey, fishing, golf, handball, mountaineering, padel tennis, polo, roller hockey, rowing, rugby union, sailing, skiing, swimming, tennis, and volleyball.
