= Manuel Flores Mora =

Uruguayan journalist and politician (1923–1985)

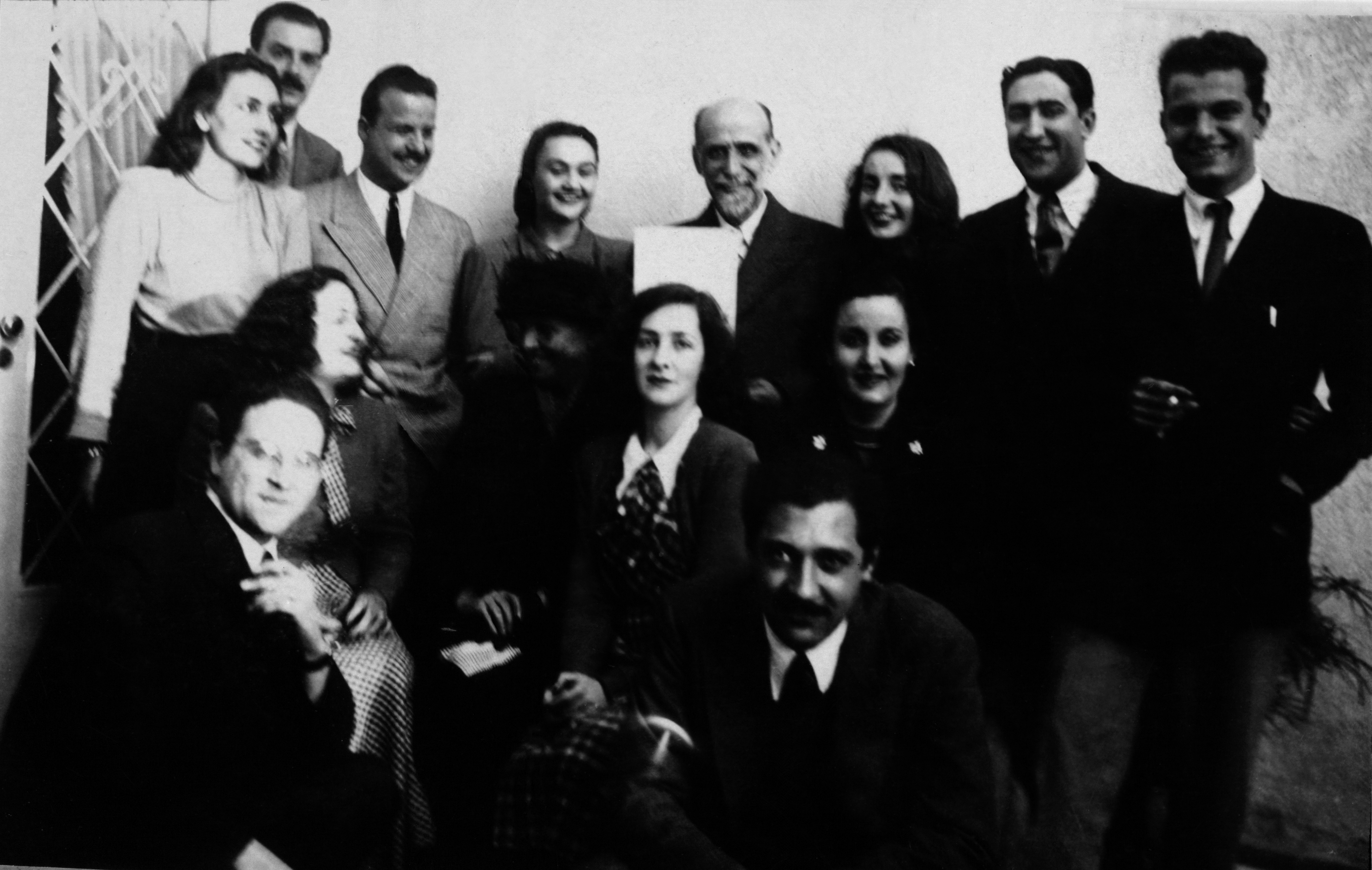
Manuel Flores Mora (first row, center) and other fellows from the Generation '45 receiving Juan Ramón Jiménez.

Manuel Flores Mora (September 4, 1923 – February 15, 1985) was a Uruguayan journalist and politician representing the Colorado Party.

== Background and early career ==
A direct descendant of 19th century President Venancio Flores, Flores worked in his youth for a range of newspapers, including the daily Acción where he became political editor and later deputy editor; and he also wrote for the famous weekly Uruguayan newspaper Marcha.

He is remembered as a member of the Generation of 45, a Uruguayan intellectual and literary movement: Carlos Maggi, Ángel Rama, Emir Rodríguez Monegal, Idea Vilariño, Carlos Real de Azúa, Carlos Martínez Moreno, Mario Arregui, Mauricio Muller, José Pedro Díaz, Amanda Berenguer, Tola Invernizzi, Mario Benedetti, Ida Vitale, Líber Falco, Juan Cunha, Juan Carlos Onetti, among others.

== Political roles ==
He stood for election and in 1954 became a Deputy, serving three terms until rising to the post of Senator in 1966. A year later he was named Minister of Cattle Ranching and Agriculture in the cabinet of President Óscar Diego Gestido, a position he maintained into the presidency of Jorge Pacheco Areco until June 1968 when he left due to differences over security issues. He opposed Pacheco from the Senate until 1971 when he ran for the presidency and vice-presidency simultaneously, with Amílcar Vasconcellos as his running mate. Neither slate attracted sufficient support, however, and he subsequently lost his seat in the Senate.

After the coup d'état of June 27, 1973, he became an active opponent of the new military régime. He joined the editorial board of El Día and in the last years of the dictatorship wrote articles for the magazine Jaque (which he co-founded in 1983) denouncing the wide-ranging abuses committed by the military in power.

== Death ==
He died in 1984 in his 61st year, just as parliamentary democracy was returning to Uruguay.

He was married to María Zulema Silva Vila. His son, Manuel Flores Silva, took his seat in the new Senate. His daughter, Beatriz Flores Silva, is a film director.

== See also ==
- Politics of Uruguay
