= Ida Vitale =

Uruguayan writer (born 1923)

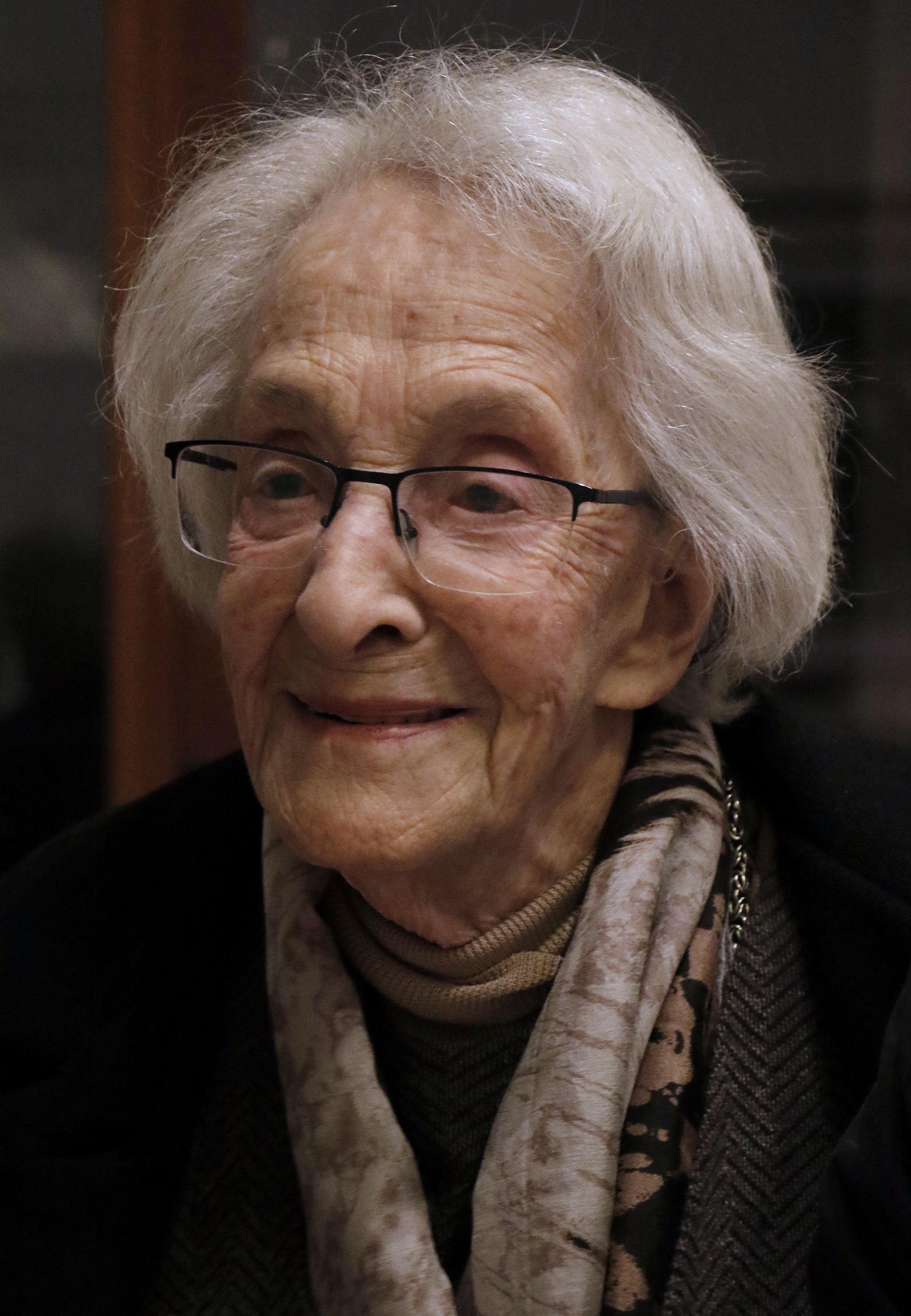
- Ida Vitale in 2022.
- Born: 2 November 1923 (age 102); Montevideo, Uruguay
- Occupations: literary critic, author, translator
- Spouse(s): Enrique Fierro; Ángel Rama
- Children: Amparo, Claudio
- Writing career
- Language: Spanish
- Notable awards: Miguel de Cervantes Prize; Alfonso Reyes Award; Delmira Agustini Medal; Premio Bartolomé Hidalgo; Premio Alas

Ida Vitale (born 2 November 1923) is a Uruguayan poet, translator, essayist, lecturer and literary critic.

== Life ==
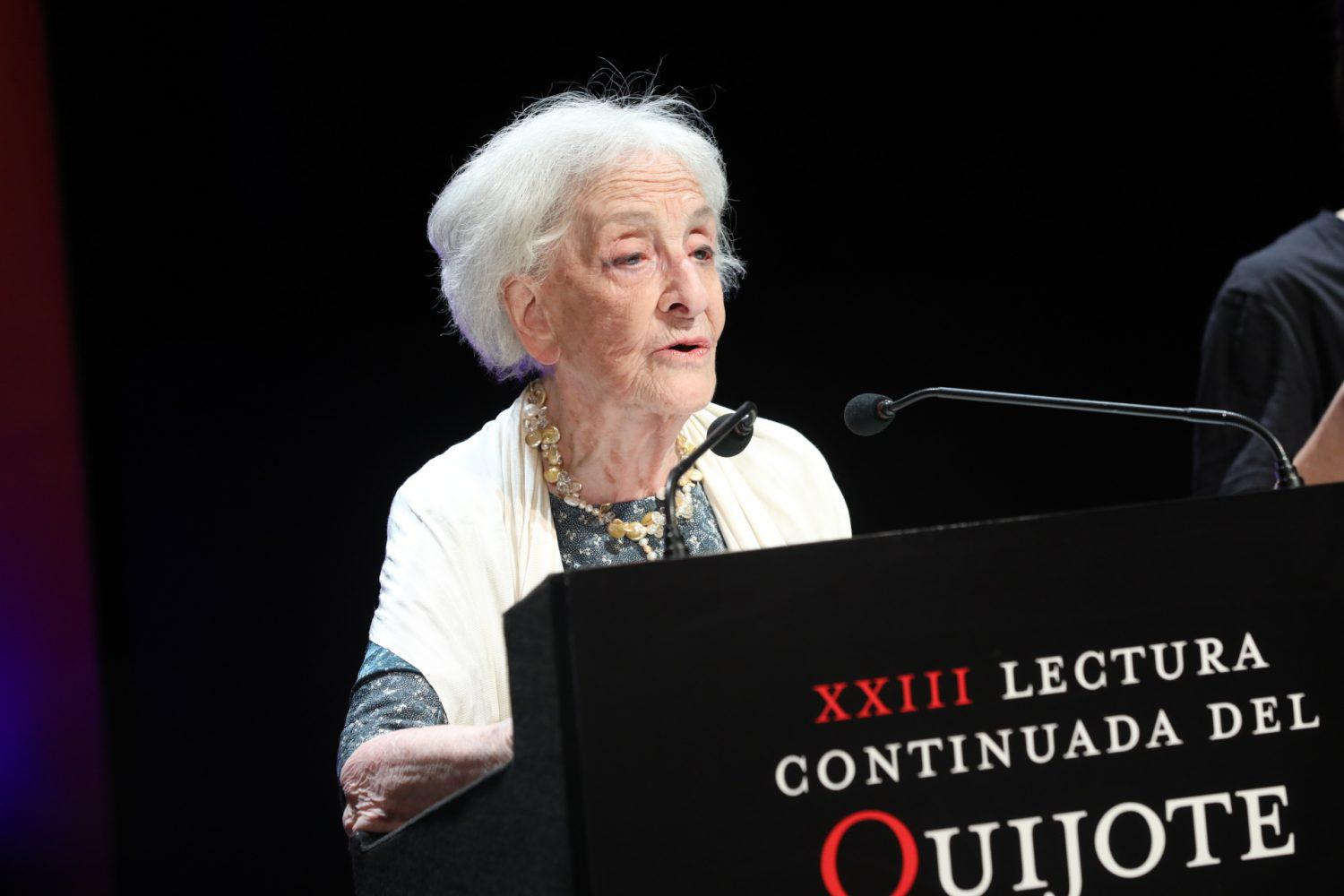
Vitale at the annual reading of Don Quixote in Madrid

She played an important role in the Uruguayan art movement known as the 'Generation of 45': Carlos Maggi, Manuel Flores Mora, Ángel Rama (who also became her second husband), Emir Rodríguez Monegal, Idea Vilariño, Carlos Real de Azúa, Carlos Martínez Moreno, Mario Arregui, Mauricio Muller, José Pedro Díaz, Amanda Berenguer, Tola Invernizzi, Mario Benedetti, Líber Falco, Juan Cunha, Juan Carlos Onetti, among others.

Vitale fled to Mexico City in 1973 for political asylum after a military junta took power in Uruguay. She resided in Austin, Texas until 2016, when she returned to Montevideo, where she currently resides. Vitale is the last surviving member of the Generation of 45. She is the recipient of multiple literary prizes and honors for the literary texts she has published. In 2019 she was awarded a Cervantes prize for her lifetime achievement.

Vitale turned 100 in November 2023.

== Prizes and honors ==
- 2019, One of the BBC's 100 women
- 2019, Premio Alas
- 2018, Miguel de Cervantes Prize
- 2017, Premio Bartolomé Hidalgo
- 2016, Premio Internacional de Poesía Federico García Lorca
- 2015, Premio Reina Sofía de poesía Iberoamericana
- 2014, Alfonso Reyes Prize
- 2010, Honorary Doctor of Letters (Doctor Honoris Causa) degree from la Universidad de la República de Uruguay.
- 2009, Premio Octavio Paz.

== Partial bibliography ==
- — (1953). Palabra dada. Montevideo: La Galatea. OCLC 9317153
- — (1960). Cada uno en su noche, poesía. Montevideo: Editorial Alfa. OCLC 4941102
- — (1968). La poesía de los años veinte. Montevideo, Uruguay: Centro Editor de América Latina. OCLC 684036
- — (1968). Fermentario Carlos Vaz Ferreira. Montevideo: Centro Editor de America Latina. OCLC 79919537
- — (1972). Oidor andante. [Montevideo]: Arca. OCLC 1399898
- — (1982). Fieles. Colección Cuadernos de poesía. México, D.F.: Universidad Nacional Autónoma de México. ISBN 968-5804-06-0
- — (1984). Entresaca. México: Editoral Oasis. OCLC 60657853
- — (1988). Sueños de la constancia. México: Fondo de Cultura Económica. ISBN 968-16-2953-1
- — (1992). Serie del sinsonte. Montevideo?: P.F.E. OCLC 47765264
- — (1994). Léxico de afinidades. México, D.F.: Editorial Vuelta. ISBN 968-6229-90-6
- — (1996). Donde vuela el camaleón. [Montevideo, Uruguay]: Vintén Editor. ISBN 9974-570-41-7
- — (1998). Procura de lo imposible. México: Fondo de cultura económica. ISBN 968-16-5475-7
- — (1998). De varia empresa. Caracas, Venezuela: Fondo Editorial Pequeña Venecia. ISBN 980-6315-53-7
- — & Sosa, V. (1998). Ida Vitale. Material de lectura, 196. México: Universidad Nacional Autónoma de México, Coordinación de difusión Cultural, Dirección de Literatura. ISBN 968-36-6259-5
- — (1999). Un invierno equivocado. México, D.F.: CIDCLI. ISBN 970-18-3258-2
- — (1999). La luz de esta memoria. Montevideo: La Galatea. ISBN 9974-570-68-9
- — (2002). Reducción del infinito. Barcelona: Tusquets Editores. ISBN 84-8310-818-6
- — (2003). De plantas y animales: acercamientos literarios. Paidós Amateurs, 10. México: Paidós. ISBN 968-853-521-4
- — (2004). El abc de byobu. Ciudad de México: Taller Ditoria. ISBN 970-93383-3-1
- — (2005). Trema. Colección La Cruz del sur, 767. Valencia: Editorial Pre-Textos. ISBN 84-8191-696-X
- —, Pollack, S., & Vitale, I. (2007). Reason enough. Austin, TX: Host Publications. ISBN 978-0-924047-42-8
- -, Vitale, I. (2020) "Fortune" trans. Tanya Huntingdon, in The Women Writers Handbook. London: Aurora Metro Books. ISBN 978-1912430338
- — (2023). Time Without Keys: Selected Poems. Translated by Sarah Pollack. New York: New Directions. ISBN 0811231925

== External resources ==
Ida Vitale recorded for the Archive of Literature of the Hispanic Division at the Library of Congress, Washington, D.C., on September 12, 1986. Ms. Vitale reads the following works from her anthology, Fieles: "Palabra dada", "Cada uno en su noche", "Oidor andante", "Jardín de sílice", "Hora nona", "Se noi siamo figure di specchio", and "Sueños de la constancia".

== See also ==
- Latin American Literature
