= Carlos Real de Azúa =

Uruguayan lawyer and academic

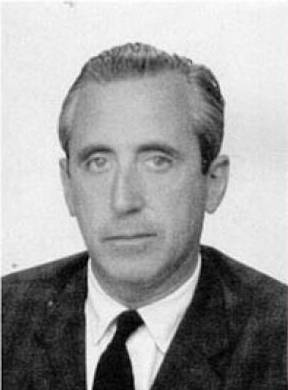
- Born: Carlos Real de Azúa; February 15, 1916; Montevideo
- Died: July 16, 1977 (aged 61); Montevideo
- Occupation: businessman

Carlos Real de Azúa (March 15, 1916 – July 16, 1977) was a Uruguayan lawyer, professor, essayist, sociologist and historian.

== Biography ==
Real de Azúa Real was born into an old Uruguayan family, the first Real de Azúa having arrived at the Río de la Plata in 1794. He was a Catholic and, in his youth, an enthusiastic fascist and anti-liberal, an admirer of the Falange Española (a Spanish Fascist movement that was active in 1933-34), a fan of the right-wing journalist and politician Benito Nardone (who would later become president of Uruguay in 1960-61), and an outspoken critic of Batllism (the statist and redistributionist political philosophy of José Batlle y Ordóñez, president of Uruguay from 1903 to 1907 and 1911 to 1915).

In his later life, Real described his early ideological journey as a beginning with “antitotalitarianism” and then progressing to “tercerismo” (i.e. “thirdism,” a via media between Soviet Communism and Western democratic capitalism), to “the left and autonomous action,” to “the balanced left,” and ultimately to “advocate for the devil of the left and Marxism.” In 1948, he began to write for Marcha, an influential leftist weekly edited by Carlos Quijano. His writings for Marcha indicated a movement from the right to the left, although he was always viewed as retaining elements of his reactionary youth. He also joined the Popular Union, a left-wing party.

He is remembered as a member of the Generación del 45, a Uruguayan intellectual and literary movement: Carlos Maggi, Manuel Flores Mora, Ángel Rama, Emir Rodríguez Monegal, Idea Vilariño, Carlos Martínez Moreno, Mario Arregui, Mauricio Muller, José Pedro Díaz, Amanda Berenguer, Tola Invernizzi, Mario Benedetti, Ida Vitale, Líber Falco, Juan Cunha, and Juan Carlos Onetti, among others.

His writings have been described as conveying a “horror of the void” and can be categorized variously as belonging to the genres of history, political essay, cultural criticism, and “criticism of customs.” His prose style was extravagant and complex, “made up of a slow chaos of periods that wind endlessly through the paragraph, and where the subordinates and parentheses are encapsulated within each other like Russian dolls.” One critic considers him one of the three leading members of his generation of Uruguayan writers, the other two being Rama and Monegal. His work was frequently described as “arborescent,” which means “resembling a tree,” but which in his case was used by critics in the sense established by Gilles Deleuze and Félix Guattari, namely “to characterize thinking marked by insistence on totalizing principles, binarism, and dualism.” The critic Roberto Echavarren called him “the baroque historian.” Rama praised him as a first-rate example of the “sociological imagination.”

His influence on Uruguayan culture can only be compared to that of Carlos Vaz Ferreira, Carlos Quijano, José Enrique Rodó, and Juan E. Pivel Devoto. Some consider him a modern version of a Renaissance polymath.

From 1937 to 1966, he taught literature at the secondary-school level. From 1954 to 1967, he was a professor at the Instituto de Profesores Artigas, teaching courses in Ibero-American literature and in the literature of the Rio de la Plata region. From 1952 to 1976, he taught Literary Aesthetics at the same institution. He was also a professor of Political Science at the Faculty of Economic Sciences from 1967 to 1974.

Ruben Cotelo wrote a short biography of him. A 1984 special issue of weekly magazine Jaque consisted of a collection of tributes to him by César Aguiar, Mariano Arana, Lisa Block de Behar, Tulio Halperin Donghi, Enrique Fierro, Carlos Filgueiras, Carlos Martínez Moreno, Juan Oddone, Carlos Pellegrino, Blanca París, Mercedes Ramírez, Juan Rial, Emir Rodríguez Monegal, Ricardo Rodríguez Pereyra, Marta Sabelli de Loucau, and Ida Vitale. Lisa Block de Behar wrote several articles about the author. Tulio Halperín Dongui wrote Carlos Real de Azúa: the avid curiosity about the world. Susana Mallo wrote a doctoral thesis on Real de Azúa, Pablo Rocca published several articles and Marcos Daniel Aguilar wrote about him in Cariatide, a magazine in Mexico. The book Carlos Real de Azúa, Una biografía intelectual, was published in 2017 by Valetin Trujillo.

== Personal life ==
Real de Azúa never married. A centenary tribute described him as “a solitary gentleman” and noted that while he did not write explicitly about sexual orientation, he emerges in his work as an “elegantly melancholic” figure who is “like a character out of Luchino Visconti.”

== Selected works ==
- El patriciado uruguayo (1961)
- Problemas de la enseñanza literaria: la elección de autores (Asir. 1961)
- El impulso y su freno (1964)
- Cronología comparada de la historia del Uruguay 1830-1945 (with Blanca París de Oddone, Aurelio Lucchini, Otilia Muras, Arturo Ardao, Washington Buño, Lauro Ayestarán, and Susana Salgado. 1966)
- Política, poder y partidos en el Uruguay de hoy (1971)
- El clivaje mundial eurocentro – periferia y las áreas exceptuadas (para una comparación con el caso latinoamericano) (1975)
- Uruguay: ¿una sociedad amortiguadora? (posthumous. 1985)
