= Idea Vilariño =

Uruguayan poet, essayist and literary critic

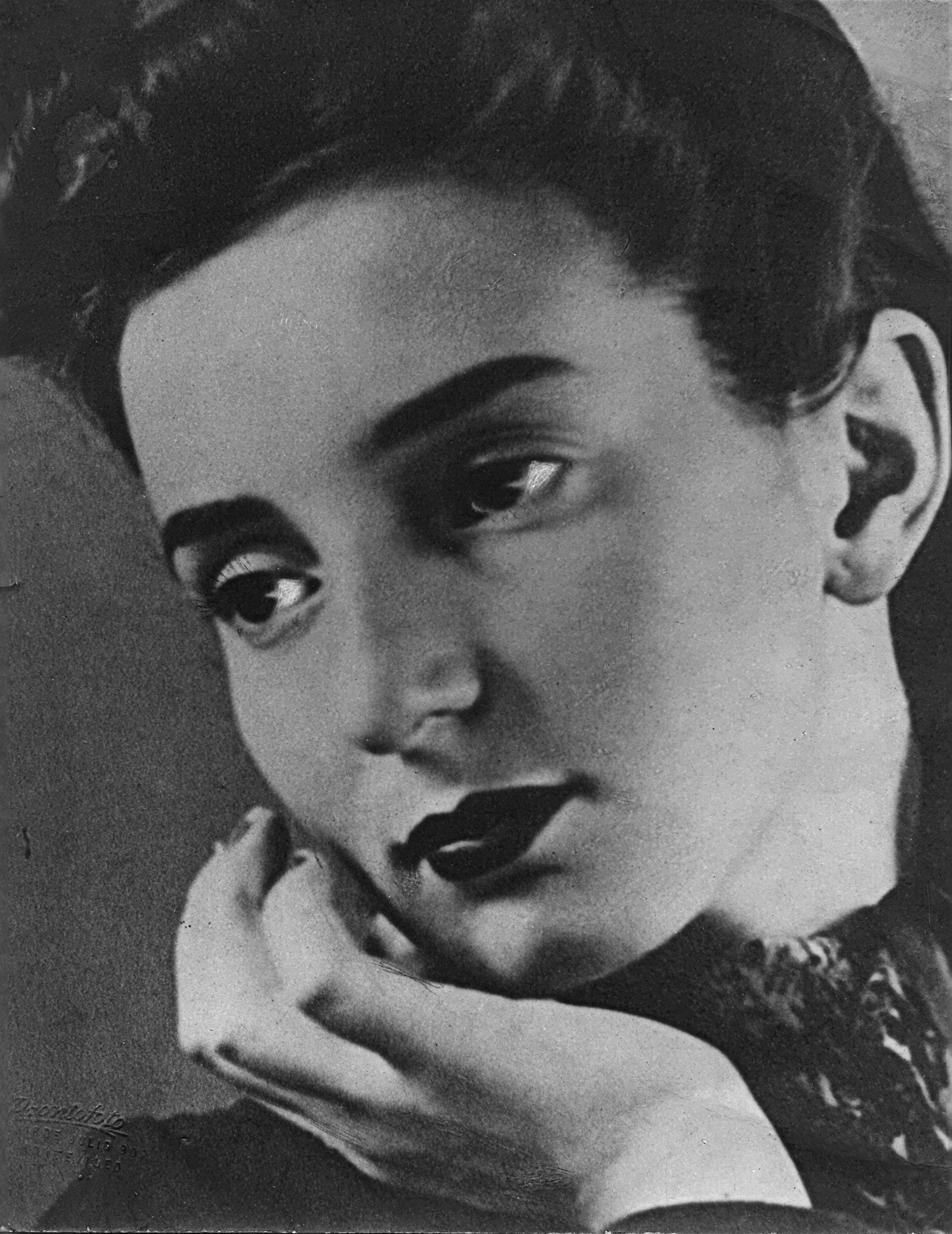
- A young Idea Vilariño
- Born: August 18, 1920; Montevideo
- Died: April 28, 2009 (aged 88); Montevideo
- Occupations: writer, poet, essayist, professor, translator, literary critic.
- Movement: Generación del 45

Idea Vilariño Romani (Montevideo, 18 August 1920 – 28 April 2009) was a Uruguayan poet, essayist and literary critic.

She belonged to the group of intellectuals known as "Generación del 45". In this generation, there are several writers such as Juan Carlos Onetti, Mario Benedetti, Sarandy Cabrera, Carlos Martínez Moreno, Ángel Rama, Carlos Real de Azúa, Carlos Maggi, Alfredo Gravina, Mario Arregui, Amanda Berenguer, Humberto Megget, Emir Rodríguez Monegal, Gladys Castelvecchi and José Pedro Díaz among others.

She also worked as a translator, composer and lecturer.

== Biography ==
She was born to an educated, middle-class family where music and literature were always present. Her father, Leandro Vilariño (1892–1944), was a poet whose works were not published in his lifetime. Just like her siblings, Numen, Poema, Azul, and Alma, she studied music. Her mother was very well educated in European literature.

She was a professor of literature and secondary education from 1952 until The Coup of 1973. After the restoration of the democratic system, she returned to education, working as a professor in the department of Uruguayan and Latin-American literature in the College of Education of Humanities and Sciences of The University of the Republic.

She started writing at a very young age, and her first mature poems were written between 17 and 21 years old. Her first poetic work, La suplicante, was published in 1945. In the subsequent years, she would become recognized internationally and awarded with various awards. Her poems were marked by an intimate experience, intense and distressing, but always very coherent.

Idea was included in the group of writers known as the Generación del 45 who became prominent between 1945 and 1950. Among the Generación del 45 the following authors can be found: Juan Carlos Onetti, with whom she had a love affair, Mario Benedetti, Sarandy Cabrera, Carlos Martínez Moreno, Ángel Rama, Carlos Real de Azúa, Carlos Maggi, Alfredo Gravina, Mario Arregui, Amanda Berenguer, Humberto Megget, Emir Rodríguez Monegal, Gladys Castelvecchi, José Pedro Díaz, and others.

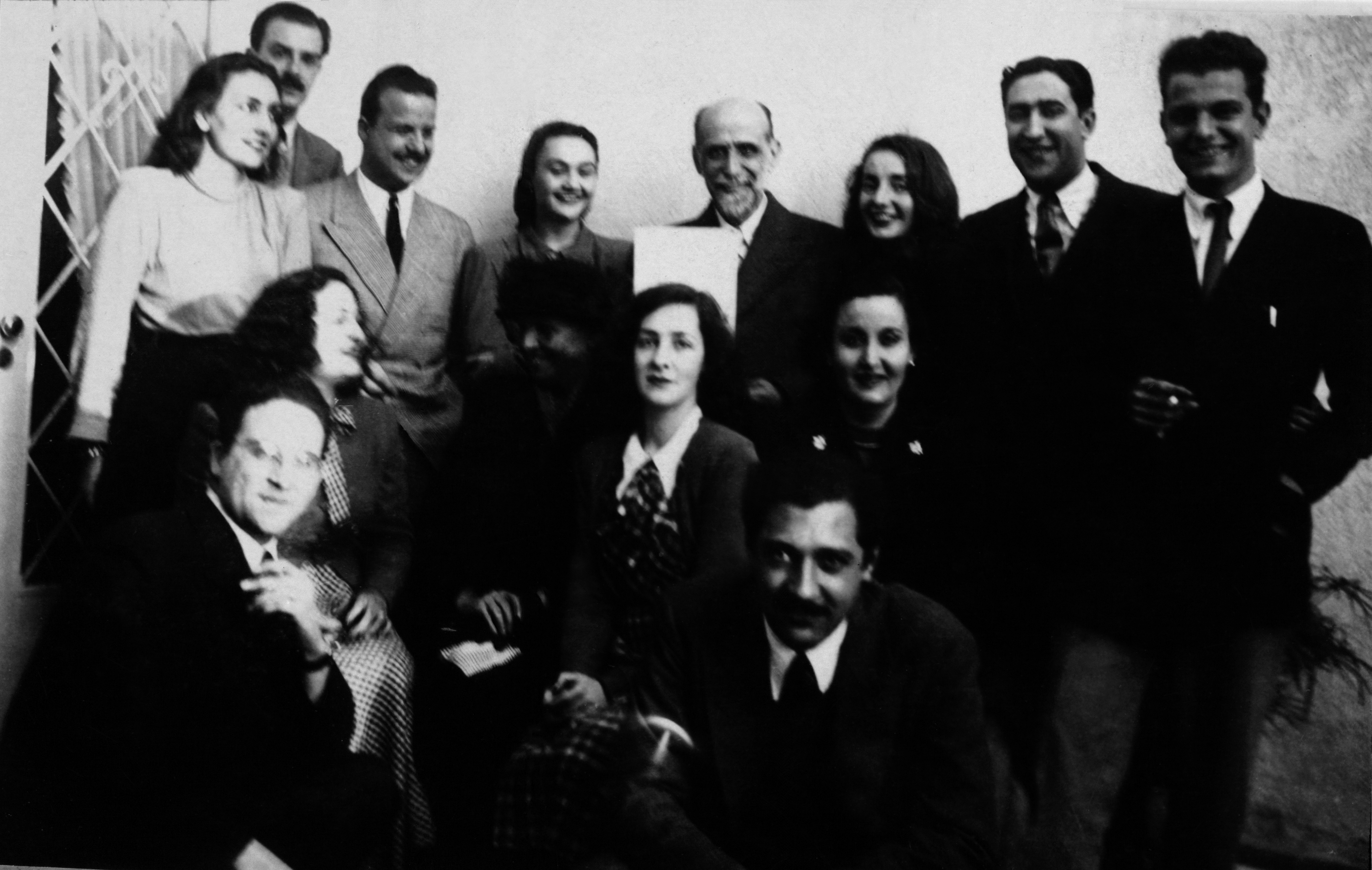
La Generación del 45 for the occasion of the visit of Juan Ramón Jiménez. From left to right: María Zulema Silva Vila, Manuel Arturo Claps, Carlos Maggi, María Inés Silva Vila, Juan Ramón Jiménez, Idea Vilariño, Emir Rodríguez Monegal, Ángel Rama. Sitting: José Pedro Díaz, Amanda Berenguer, Zenobia Camprubí, Ida Vitale, Elda Lago, and Manuel Flores Mora.

She participated in numerous literary ventures. She was one of the founders of the journals Clinamen, and Número, between 1945 and 1955 (where she met Juan Ramón Jiménez); and she collaborated on other publications, such as Marcha, La Opinión, Brecha, Asir, and Texto crítico.

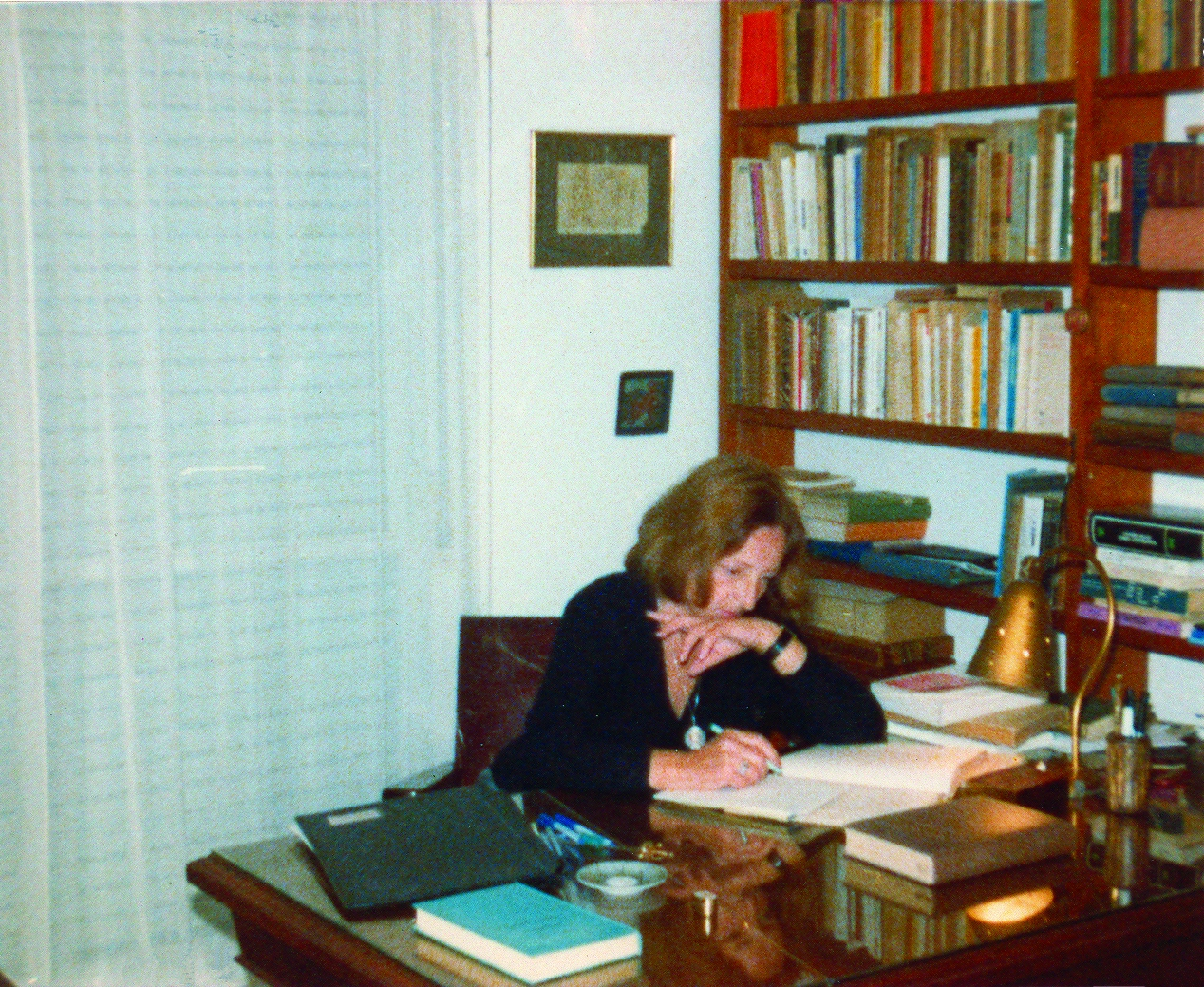
Idea Vilariño at her desk in 1983

Her translations also have been the object of recognition, with some of them, such as the more recognized works of Shakespeare, being performed in the theaters of Montevideo.

In 1997, she was interviewed by Rosario Peyrou and Pablo Rocca, from which the documentary Idea arose. The documentary was directed by Mario Jacob and premiered in May 1998.

Her work has been translated to various languages, including Italian, German, and Portuguese.

As a composer, four emblematic songs can be mentioned that are pertinent to popular Uruguayan music: A una paloma (performed by Daniel Viglietti), La canción y el poema (performed by Alfredo Zitarrosa), Los orientales, and Ya me voy pa' la guerrilla (performed by Los Olimareños).

In 2004, she received the Premio Konex (Konex prize) MERCOSUR a las Letras, granted by the Konex Foundation (Argentina), as the most influential writer of the region.

Later, she had to undergo surgery that left her with an intestinal and arterial occlusion. She did not recover, and died in Montevideo on 28 April 2009.

== Works ==
=== Poetry ===
- La suplicante (1945).
- Cielo Cielo (1947).
- Paraíso perdido (Número. 1949).
- Por aire sucio (Número. 1950).
- Nocturnos (1955).
- Poemas de amor (1957).
- Pobre Mundo (1966).
- Poesía (1970).
- No (1980).
- Canciones (1993).
- Poesía 1945 - 1990 (1994).
- Poesía completa (Montevideo. Cal y Canto. 2000).

=== Essays ===
- Grupos simétricos en la poesía de Antonio Machado (1951).
- La rima en Herrera y Reissig (1955).
- Grupos simétricos en poesía (1958).
- Las letras de tango (1965).
- El tango cantado (1981).

=== Translations ===
- Raymond Queneau: El rapto de Ícaro, Buenos Aires, Losada, 1973^{7}
- Jacques C. Alexis: Romancero de las estrellas, Montevideo, Arca, 1973^{8}
- William Shakespeare: Hamlet, príncipe de Dinamarca, Montevideo, Ediciones de la Banda Oriental, 1974.^{9}
- Andrew Cecil Bradley: Macbeth, la atmósfera, las brujas, Montevideo, Editorial Técnica, 1976.^{9}
- William Shakespeare: Macbeth, Montevideo, Editorial Técnica, 1977.^{9}
- Guillermo Enrique Hudson: La tierra purpúrea, Caracas, Biblioteca Ayacucho, 1980 (traducida junto con Jaime Rest).^{10}
- Guillermo Enrique Hudson: Allá lejos y hace tiempo, Caracas, Biblioteca Ayacucho, 1980 (traducida junto con Jaime Rest).^{10}
- Christine Laurent: Transatlántico (Adaptación de André Tachiné y Philippe Arnaud. Traducción del francés de Idea Vilariño). Montevideo, Trilce, 1996.^{9}

== Bibliography ==
- Idea: La vida escrita (libro álbum. Contiene entrevistas, fragmentos de su diario íntimo y cartas. Montevideo, Cal y Canto y Academia Nacional de Letras, 2007, ISBN 978-9974-54-053-8.
- Rosario Peyrou, prologue to Vuelo ciego, Visor, Madrid, 2004, ISBN 978-84-7522-565-4 (anthology by the author).
- Larre Borges, Ana Inés (2023). Idea Vilariño y la traducción (in Spanish). Montevideo: Biblioteca Nacional de Uruguay..
- Ramos González, Tania. Tesis de maestría sobre la idea de muerte en la poesía de la uruguaya Idea Vilariño (in Spanish). University of Puerto Rico, Río Piedras Campus..
