= Generación del 45 =

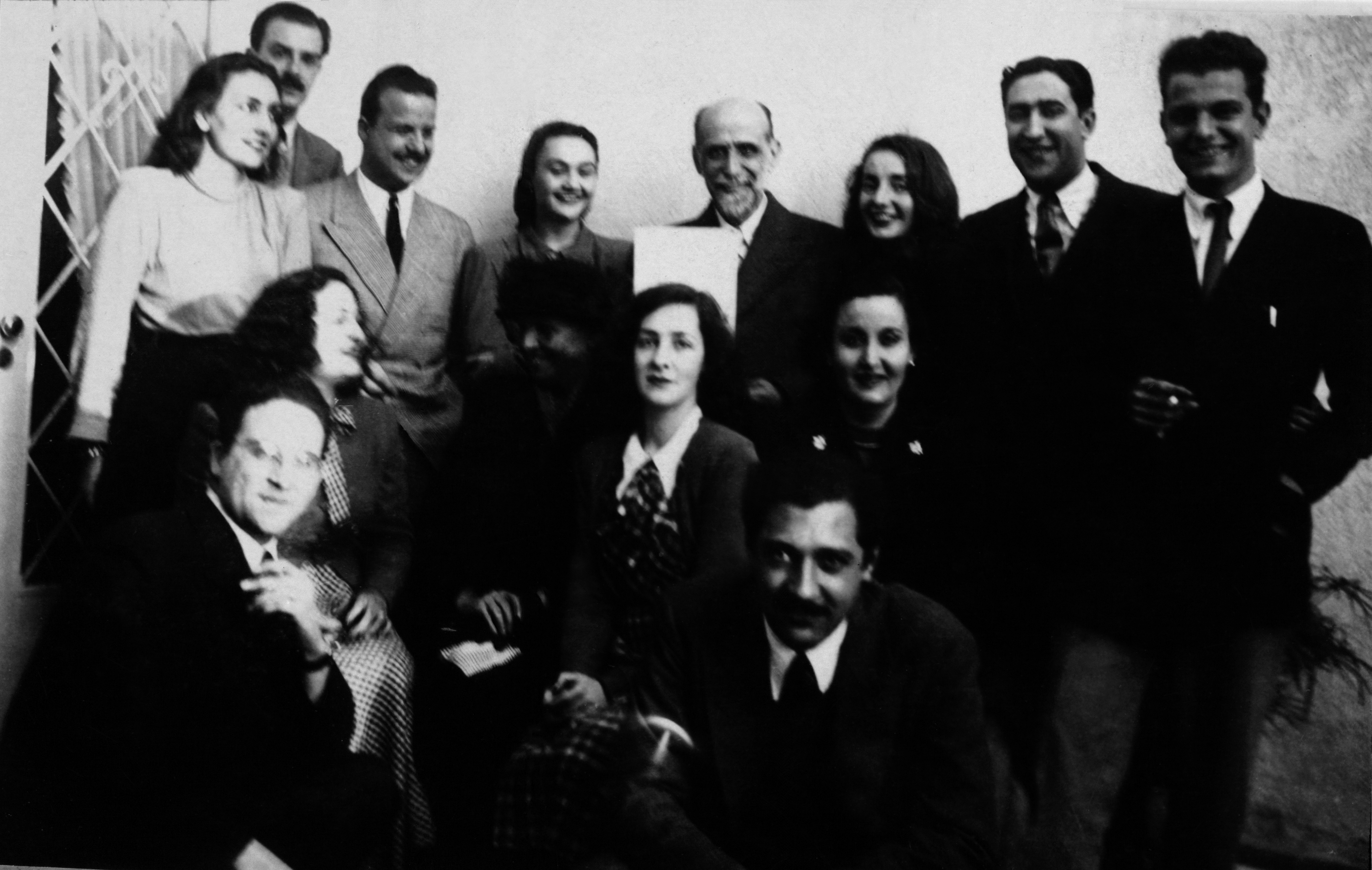
The Generation '45 receiving Juan Ramón Jiménez. From left to right, standing: María Zulema Silva Vila, Manuel Arturo Claps, Carlos Maggi, María Inés Silva Vila, Juan Ramón Jiménez, Idea Vilariño, Emir Rodríguez Monegal, Ángel Rama. Seated: José Pedro Díaz, Amanda Berenguer, Zenobia Camprubí, Ida Vitale, Elda Lago, Manuel Flores Mora.

The Generation '45 (Spanish: Generación del 45) was a group of writers, mainly from Uruguay, who had a notable influence in the literary and cultural life of their country and region. Their name derives from the fact that their careers started out mainly between 1945 and 1950.

== Members ==
- Mario Arregui
- Carlos Real de Azúa
- Orfila Bardesio
- Mario Benedetti
- Amanda Berenguer
- Domingo Bordoli
- Carlos Brandy
- Sarandy Cabrera
- Gladys Castelvecchi
- Juan Cunha
- José Pedro Díaz
- Líber Falco
- Alfredo Gravina
- José Luis "Tola" Invernizzi
- Carlos Maggi
- Humberto Megget
- Emir Rodríguez Monegal
- María de Montserrat
- Manuel Flores Mora
- Carlos Martínez Moreno
- Selva Márquez
- Mauricio Müller
- Juan Carlos Onetti
- Ángel Rama
- Armonía Somers
- María Inés Silva Vila
- Idea Vilariño
- Ida Vitale
- Giselda Zani

== See also ==
- Generation of '27
