= Emir Rodríguez Monegal =

Uruguaian scholar, literary critic, and editor (1921–1985)

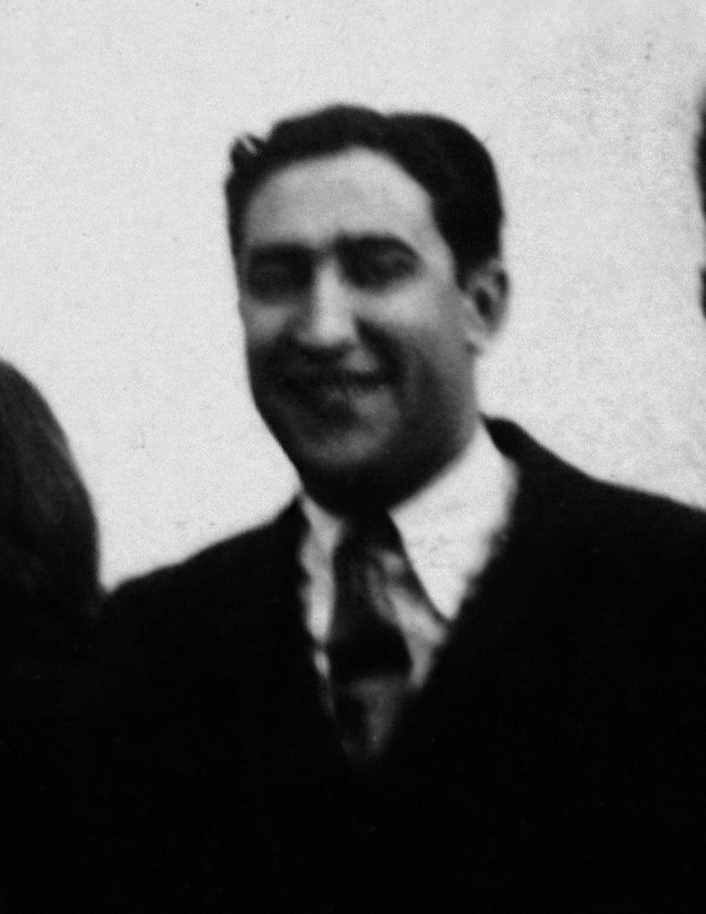
- Emir Rodríguez Monegal with the Generation of 45 on the occasion of the visit of Juan Ramón Jiménez.
- Born: 28 July 1921; Melo, Uruguay
- Died: 14 November 1985 (aged 64); New Haven, Connecticut, USA
- Occupations: Writer, translator, professor and poet

Emir Rodríguez Monegal (28 July 1921 – 14 November 1985), born in Uruguay, was a scholar, literary critic, and editor of Latin American literature. From 1969 to 1985, Rodríguez Monegal was professor of Latin American contemporary literature at Yale University. He is usually called by his second surname Emir R. Monegal or Monegal (or erroneously Emir Rodríguez-Monegal).

Described as "one of the most influential Latin American literary critics of the 20th century" by the Encyclopædia Britannica, Monegal wrote key books about Pablo Neruda and Jorge Luis Borges, and the Britannica Macropædia notice of the later. He was a part in "The Boom" of 1960s Latin American literature as founder and 1966–1968 editor of his influential magazine Mundo Nuevo. Umberto Eco was quoted in saying that Jorge Luis Borges had read almost everything but no one knew that indiscernable totallity better than Emir.

He is remembered as a member of the Generation of 45, a Uruguayan intellectual and literary movement: Carlos Maggi, Manuel Flores Mora, Ángel Rama, Idea Vilariño, Carlos Real de Azúa, Carlos Martínez Moreno, Mario Arregui, Mauricio Muller, José Pedro Díaz, Amanda Berenguer, Tola Invernizzi, Mario Benedetti, Ida Vitale, Líber Falco, Juan Cunha, Juan Carlos Onetti, among others.

== Biography ==
=== Early career (1921–1965) ===
In 1921, Emir Rodríguez Monegal was born on 28 July in Melo, Cerro Largo, Uruguay. He had the double-barrelled name Rodríguez Monegal (erroneously "Rodríguez-Monegal" in some texts) but was often referred to as R. Monegal or Monegal only, a Spanish naming custom when the first surname is extremely common.

From 1945 to 1957 (age 24 to 36), he edited the literary section of the Montevideo weekly Marcha. He was one of the first to recognize early on the importance of Borges, seeing him and his family frequently after 1945, and taking him for model to the point of pastiche. Conversely, he got a cameo in a pseudo-autobiographical Borges short story:

The second episode took place in Montevideo, months later. Don Pedro's fever and his agony gave me the idea for a tale of fantasy based on the defeat at Masoller; Emir Rodriguez Monegal, to whom I had told the plot, wrote me an introduction to Colonel Dionisio Tabares, who had fought in that campaign.

— Jorge Luis Borges, from "The Other Death" (published in La Nación, 1949, collected in The Aleph, 1949)

In 1949 (age 28), he won a scholarship from the British Council for a year's study at the University of Cambridge; he went to study under F. R. Leavis and complete a project on Andrés Bello. During 1949 to 1955 (age 28 to 34), he was also editor of Número, a Montevideo literary magazine. In 1952, he became friend with Pablo Neruda, who would later lend him his intimate papers for Monegal's biography of Neruda.

In 1956 (age 35), Monegal obtained the equivalent of a PhD at the Facultad de Humanidades (Faculty of Letters), Montevideo, for his research on "Andrés Bello y el Romanticismo hispanoamericano".

=== Mundo Nuevo (1966–1968) ===
In 1966 (age 45), Monegal directed the literary monthly Mundo Nuevo, published in Spanish in Paris. Monegal directed it until July 1968, after the New York Times uncovered CIA connections with the Congress for Cultural Freedom, the Cold War mega-organization under which auspicies Mundo Nuevo was born. Mundo Nuevo contributed to the 1960s publishing phenomenon dubbed "The Boom" in Latin American literature that led to many Latin American writers being published outside of their home countries and gaining critical recognition.

=== Yale University (1969–1985) ===
In 1969 (age 48), Monegal was appointed professor of Latin American contemporary literature at Yale University. From 1970 to 1973 (age 49 to 52), he was chairman of the Latin American Studies program and associate chairman of the Department of Romance Languages. From 1973 to 1976 (age 49 to 55), he was chairman of the Spanish and Portuguese Department.

From 1969 to 1977 (age 48 to 56), he was a member of the editorial board of Revista Iberoamericana (University of Pittsburgh) and from 1972 to 1977 (age 51 to 56) he was consulting editor of Review, a tri-quarterly published by the Center for Inter-American Relations in New York.

Also, from 1975 to 1982 (age 54 to 61), he was a visiting lecturer in seven universities in Brazil, and a visiting professor at the University of Southern California and the University of Pittsburgh.

In 1985 (aged 64), Monegal died on Thursday 14 November at Yale's infirmary in New Haven, Connecticut, USA. He was survived by his wife: Selma Calasans Rodrigues de Rodríguez; and three children: Georgina Rodríguez Nebot, Joaquín Rodríguez Nebot, and Alejandro Rodríguez Gerona.

=== Legacy ===
- His 1966–1968 work with Mundo Nuevo, as well as his books and lectures, was influential for the spread of Latin American literature, launching the career of such as Guillermo Cabrera Infante, Severo Sarduy, and Manuel Puig, and contributing to the internationalization of writers such as Gabriel García Márquez, Carlos Fuentes, and Mario Vargas Llosa.
- His April 1968 article "Nota sobre Biorges" (reused in a chapter of his 1970 Borgès) introduced the concept of "Biorges". According to him, when Adolfo Bioy Casares and Jorge Luis Borges collaborated under the pseudonyms H. Bustos Domecq or B. Suárez Lynch, the results seemed written by a new personality, more than the sum of its parts, which he dubbed "Biorges" and considered in his own right as "one of the most important Argentine prose writers of his time", for having influenced writers such as Leopoldo Marechal (an otherwise anti-Borgesian), or Julio Cortázar's use of fictional language and slang in his masterpiece Hopscotch.
- His 1966 biography of his friend Pablo Neruda, who accepted to lend him his personal papers, remains a key book on the topic. Similarly, his 1970 study and 1978 biography of his friend Borges remain key books.
- In June 1985, Monegal published an article exploring the "kinship" between Derrida's themes in "Plato's Pharmacy" and the work of Borges, from essays and tales Derrida had read such as "Pierre Menard" (1939) and "Tlön" (1940). He wrote that "I had experienced [deconstruction] in Borges avant la lettre, though also writing that "the intent here is not to produce another exercise of the 'Borges, presursor of Derrida' variety."

== Bibliography ==
The bulk of Monegal's works exists only in Spanish. For untranslated texts, an English equivalent of the title is provided in parentheses.

=== Books ===
- 1950: José Enrique Rodó en el Novecientos ("José Enrique Rodó in the twentieth century")
- 1956: El juicio de los parricidas. La nueva generación argentina y sus maestros. ("The trial of the parricides. The new Argentine generation and their masters.", study of the dismissal of Borges, Mallea, and Martínez Estrada in Argentina)
- 1961: Las raíces de Horacio Quiroga ("The roots of Horacio Quiroga")
- 1961: Narradores de esta América ("Storytellers of this America", seventeen essays on prominent fiction writers of contemporary Latin American literature)
  - Expanded to thirty-four writers in two volumes (1969 and 1974)
- 1963: Eduardo Acevedo Díaz. Dos versiones de un mismo tema. ("Eduardo Acevedo Díaz. Two versions of a same theme.")
- 1964: Ingmar Bergman. Un dramaturgo cinematográfico. (with Homero Alsina Thevenet, "Ingmar Bergman. A cinematographic playwright.")
- 1966: El viajero inmóvil: Introducción a Pablo Neruda ("The immobile traveler: an introduction to Pablo Neruda")
  - Neruda, le voyageur immobile (1973, French)
- 1967: Genio y figura de Horacio Quiroga ("Genius and character of Horacio Quiroga")
- 1968: El desterrado: Vida y obra de Horacio Quiroga ("The exile: life and work of Horacio Quiroga")
- 1969: El otro Andrés Bello ("The other Andrés Bello")
- 1970: Borgès par lui même (French, "Borges by himself")
  - Borges por él mismo (1979, Spanish)
  - Μπόρχες (Borches, 1987, Greek)
- 1976: Borges: Hacia una lectura poética ("Borges: towards a poetic reading"), erroneous title printed for Borges: Hacia una poética de la lectura ("Borges: towards a poetics of reading")
  - Borges, uma poética da leitura (1980, Portuguese)
- 1978: Jorge Luis Borges: A Literary Biography
  - Borges : una biografia letteraria (1982, Italian)
  - Jorge Luis Borges: biographie littéraire (1983, French)
  - Jorge Luis Borges: una biografía literaria (1985, Spanish)

=== Articles ===
Selected among more than 330 articles and notices:

- 1955: "Borges: Teoría y práctica", in: Número 27
  - Expanded, in: Narradores de esta América, Tomo 1 (1969)
- 1968: "Nota sobre Borges", in: Mundo Nuevo 22
- 1972: "Borges: the Reader as Writer", in: TriQuarterly 25
- 1974: "Borges, Jorge Luis", in: Encyclopædia Britannica, Macropædia Vol. 3
- 1974: "Borges, a Reader", in: diacritics 4
- 1975: "Realismo mágico versus literatura fantástica: Un diálogo de sordos", in: Yates, A. Donald, ed. (1975) Otros Mundos, Otros Fuegos. Fantasía y realismo mágico en Iberoamérica.
- 1976: "Borges: Una Teoría de la Literatura Fantástica", in: Revista Iberoamericana 42
- 1985: "Borges y Derrida: boticarios", in: Maldoror 21
  - "Borges and Derrida. Apothecaries", in: Aizenberg, Edna, ed. (1990). Borges and His Successors. The Borgian Impact on Literature and the Arts.

=== Edited ===
- 1950: La literatura uruguaya del Novecientos ("Uruguayan literature of the twentieth century", compilation of essays and documents)
- 1957: José Enrique Rodó. Obras completas ("José Enrique Rodó: complete works")
- 1963: José Enrique Rodó: Páginas ("José Enrique Rodó: pages", anthology)
- 1966: El cuento uruguayo ("The Uruguayan tale", short-story anthology)
- 1966: Juan Carlos Onetti: Los rostros del amor ("Juan Carlos Onetti: the faces of love", erotic texts anthology)
- 1968: El arte de narrar ("The art of narration", interviews with leading Hispanic prose fiction writers)
- 1970: Juan Carlos Onetti. Novelas y cuentos completos. ("Juan Carlos Onetti. Complete novels and tales", anthology)
- 1977: The Borzoi Anthology of Latin American Literature, 2 volumes (with Thomas Colchie)
- 1979: Maestros hispánicos del siglo veinte ("Hispanic masters of the 20th century", with Suzanne Jill Levine)
- 1980: Pablo Neruda (collection of critical essays on Pablo Neruda)
- 1981: Borges: A Reader (anthology, with Alastair Reid)
  - Borges: Ficcionario (1984, Spanish)

== See also ==
- List of Uruguayan writers
- List of contemporary writers from northern Uruguay
