= José Pedro Díaz =

Uruguayan essayist, educator, and writer

José Pedro Díaz (January 12, 1921 - July 3, 2006) was a Uruguayan essayist, educator and writer.

He is remembered as a member of the Generation of 45, a Uruguayan intellectual and literary movement: Carlos Maggi, Manuel Flores Mora, Ángel Rama, Emir Rodríguez Monegal, Idea Vilariño, Carlos Real de Azúa, Carlos Martínez Moreno, Mario Arregui, Mauricio Muller, Amanda Berenguer, Tola Invernizzi, Mario Benedetti, Ida Vitale, Líber Falco, Juan Cunha, Juan Carlos Onetti, among others.

== Works ==
=== Poetry ===
- Canto full. First notebook, Montevideo, Printing "Stella", 1939.
- Canto full. Second notebook, Montevideo, "Printing of John Cunha Dotti", 1940.
- Treaty of flame, Montevideo, La Galatea, 1957.
- Exercises anthropological, Xalapa (Mexico), Universidad Veracruzana, 1967.
- New treaties and other exercises (Montevideo, Ark., 1982.

=== Narrative ===
- The range rose. Suite old. Montevideo, press brakes Sixth Vocal Group, 1941.
- The inhabitant, Montevideo, La Galatea, 1949.
- Fires of San Telmo, Montevideo, Ark., 1964.
- Parts of shipwrecks, Montevideo, Ark., 1969.

=== Testing and review ===
- A conference on Julio Herrera y Reissig, Montevideo, s / e, 1948
- Poetry and magic, Montevideo, s / e, 1949
- Gustavo Adolfo Becquer: life and poetry, Montevideo: The Galatea, 1953.
- The search for the origin and the impulse to adventure in the narrative of André Gide, Montevideo, University of the Republic, 1958
- Balzac novel and society, Montevideo, Ark, 1974
- The imaginary spectacle, Montevideo. Ark, 1986
- Juan Carlos Onetti. The show imaginary II Montevideo, Ark., 1989.
- Felisberto Hernandez. The show imaginary I, Montevideo. Ark 1991
- Novel and Society, Xalapa, Veracruz University, 1992.
- Felisberto Hernandez his life and work, Nairobi, Metro 1999.
