= Ángel Rama =

Uruguayan writer (1926–1983)

- Born: April 30, 1926; Montevideo, Uruguay
- Died: November 27, 1983 (aged 57); Mejorada del Campo, Madrid, Spain

Ángel A. Rama (Spanish pronunciation: [ˈaŋxel rama]; April 30, 1926 – November 27, 1983) was a Uruguayan writer, academic, and literary critic, known for his work on modernismo and for his theorization of the concept of "transculturation."

== Biography ==
Born in Montevideo to Galician immigrants, Rama studied at the Collège de France. He married twice: in 1950, to the poet Ida Vitale, with whom he had two children, Amparo and Claudio; and after separating from Vitale in 1969, to Marta Traba, an eminent art critic, originally from Buenos Aires.

In the 1960s, after several years teaching at the secondary and university level, he became director of the department of Hispanoamerican literature at the Universidad de la República, the Uruguayan state-run University. He also founded the publishing houses Editorial Arca in Montevideo and Editorial Galerna in Buenos Aires. During the 1970s, he held professorships at numerous universities in the Americas and served as literary adviser to the Ayacucho Library in Caracas. The coup d'état of the Uruguayan government surprised him on June 27, 1973, while residing in Venezuela, so he lived in exile for the remainder of his life.

He was a member of Uruguay's "Generation of '45," also known as the "Critical Generation": Carlos Maggi, Manuel Flores Mora, Emir Rodríguez Monegal, Idea Vilariño, Carlos Real de Azúa, Carlos Martínez Moreno, Mario Arregui, Mauricio Muller, José Pedro Díaz, Amanda Berenguer, Tola Invernizzi, Mario Benedetti, Ida Vitale, Líber Falco, Juan Cunha, Juan Carlos Onetti, among others.

He contributed frequently to the weekly review Marcha until its suppression in 1974 by the military government of Juan María Bordaberry. Rama went into exile to Caracas, Venezuela, where in addition to collaborating with the press and teaching courses, he worked as the Literary Director of the recently formed Ayacucho Library. When the Uruguayan military government denied him the renewal of his Uruguayan passport, in 1977 he took Venezuelan citizenship.

He published important studies on the writings of Ruben Darío, Jose Marti, Jose Maria Arguedas, Juan Carlos Onetti, Gabriel Garcia Marquez and Mario Vargas Llosa, among others. Three of his seminal works are Transculturacion narrativa en America Latina, La ciudad letrada and Las mascaras democraticas del modernismo. Rama's interest and study of the relationships between literacy, power and the complex urban spaces of Latin America led him to develop the concept of the "lettered city," in which networks of various forms of literacy entwine.

In 1979, Rama was given an appointment as a professor at the University of Maryland and with Traba they settled in nearby Washington, DC. However, in 1982 they were denied resident visas and were forced to leave the United States. The couple moved to Paris, where they were living in early 1983 when Traba was granted Colombian citizenship by President Belisario Betancur.

He died in the crash of Avianca Flight 011 at Barajas Airport, along with Marta Traba, the Mexican writer Jorge Ibargüengoitia, and Peruvian poet Manuel Scorza, while all four were travelling from Paris to Colombia for an international conference of Latin American writers.

== Works ==
=== Fiction ===
- ¡Oh, sombra puritana!, Montevideo: Fábula, 1951.
- Tierra sin mapa, Montevideo: Asir, 1961

=== Drama ===
- La inundación (1958)
- Lucrecia (1959)
- Queridos amigos (1961)

=== Essay ===
- La aventura intelectual de Figari, Buenos Aires: Ed. Fábula, 1951.
- Ideología y arte de Eduardo Acevedo Díaz en El Combate de la Tapera, Montevideo, Arca, 1965.
- Rubén Darío y el modernismo: (circunstancia socio-económica de un arte americano). Caracas: Ediciones de la Biblioteca de la Universidad Central de Venezuela, 1970.
- Diez problemas para el novelista latinoamericano. Caracas: Síntesis dosmil, 1972
- La generación crítica. 1939 - 1969. Montevideo: Arca, 1972.
- Salvador Garmendia y la narrativa informalista. Caracas: Ediciones de la Biblioteca de la Universidad Central de Venezuela, 1975.
- Rufino Blanco Fombona y el egotismo latinoamericano. Valencia: Universidad de Carabobo, 1975.
- Los gauchipolíticos rioplatenses. Literatura y sociedad. Buenos Aires: Calicanto, 1976; Buenos Aires, Centro Editor de América Latina, 1982.
- Los dictadores latinoamericanos. México: Fondo de Cultura Económica, 1976.
- El universo simbólico de José Antonio Ramos Sucre. Universidad de Oriente, Cumaná, 1978.
- Novísimos narradores hispanoamericanos en marcha, 1964-1980. México: Marcha Editores, 1981
- Transculturación narrativa en América Latina. México: Siglo XXI, 1982.
- La novela latinoamericana. Panoramas 1920-1980. Bogotá: Colcultura, 1982.
- Literatura y clase social. México: Folios Ediciones, 1984.
- La ciudad letrada. Municipio de Hanover (Nueva Jersey): Ediciones del Norte, 1984. As The Lettered City, Durham, Carolina del Norte: Duke University Press, 1996.
- Las máscaras democráticas del modernismo. Montevideo: Fundación Ángel Rama, 1985.
- La crítica de la cultura en América Latina. Caracas: Biblioteca Ayacucho, 1985; Barcelona: Talleres de Bodoni, 1985.
- Ensayos sobre literatura venezolana. Caracas: Monte Ávila, 1985.
- García Márquez, edificación de una cultura nacional y popular. Montevideo: Universidad de la República, 1987.
- La riesgosa navegación del escritor exiliado. Montevideo: Arca, 1993.
- Diario 1974-1983, Caracas: Ediciones Trilce / Fondo Editorial La Nave Va, 2001; Montevideo: Trilce, 2011; Caracas: Monte Ávila Editores Latinoamericana, 2012
- Literatura, cultura y sociedad en América Latina, Montevideo: Trilce, 2006.

== References and links ==
- Carlos Carlos (ed.), Ángel Rama. Crítica literaria y utopía en América Latina. Medellín, Universidad de Antioquia, 2006.
- Tomás Eloy Martínez, Ángel Rama o el placer de la crítica
- Mabel Moraña (ed.), Ángel Rama y los estudios latinoamericanos
- Spitta, Silvia. Between Two Waters: Narratives of Transculturation in Latin America (Rice UP 1995; Texas A&M 2006)
