= Tania Ramos González =

Puerto Rican author and professor

Tania Ramos González (born 14 May 1971 in San Juan) is a Puerto Rican author, poet, lecturer, columnist, and former dancer. Her poetry pseudonym is Azula. She is the granddaughter of the activist Lolita Aulet.

She obtained her PhD in Philosophy and Letters from the University of Puerto Rico, Río Piedras Campus.

Ramos writes as a columnist in several newspapers, such as El Sol de Colombia, Revista Ikaro (Costa Rica), El Siglo (Guatemala), Revista Latina NC (North Carolina), and Posdata Digital (Argentina).

== Selected works ==
- AZULA (poem anthology, 2011)
- Invisibilidades (poem anthology; Editorial Areté boricua, 2020)
- Llueve (poem anthology; unpublished)
- Piso 13 (short stories; unpublished)

== Awards ==
- Primer Premio por la Mejor Coreografía Contemporánea, Honduras 1996.
- Premio Gertrudis Gómez de Avellaneda, granted by UNESCO for her master thesis on the idea of death in Idea Vilariño's poetry work. 2002.
- Honorable mention, literary contest of Pen Club, Puerto Rico, 2014.
