= Carlos Maggi =

Uruguayan artist, journalist, and lawyer (1922–2015)

- Born: Carlos Alberto Maggi Cleffi; 5 August 1922; Montevideo, Uruguay
- Died: 15 May 2015 (aged 92); Montevideo, Uruguay
- Education: Universidad de Navarra
- Occupations: lawyer, playwright, journalist, writer
- Spouse: María Inés Silva Vila
- Awards: Premio Bartolomé Hidalgo
- Website: https://www.diegofischer.com.uy

Carlos Maggi (5 August 1922, Montevideo, Uruguay – 15 May 2015, Montevideo, Uruguay) was a Uruguayan lawyer, playwright, journalist and writer. Among his acquaintances he was known as "the Kid" (Spanish: el Pibe).

He was one of the last surviving members of the Generation of 45, a Uruguayan intellectual and literary movement: Juan Carlos Onetti, Manuel Flores Mora, Ángel Rama, Emir Rodríguez Monegal, Idea Vilariño, Carlos Real de Azúa, Carlos Martínez Moreno, Mario Arregui, Mauricio Muller, José Pedro Díaz, Amanda Berenguer, Tola Invernizzi, Mario Benedetti, Ida Vitale, Líber Falco, Juan Cunha, among others.

== Works ==
- Il Duce (2013), opera libretto, with Mauricio Rosencof, music by Federico García Vigil
- 1611-2011 Mutaciones y aggiornamientos en la economía y cultura del Uruguay (2011)
- Artigas revelado (2009), with Leonardo Borges
- La nueva historia de Artigas (2005), 8 volumes
- El fin de la discusión (2002)
- La guerra de Baltar (2001)
- Artigas y el lejano norte (1999)
- Esperando a Rodó (1998)
- Los uruguayos y la bicicleta (1995)
- La reforma inevitable (1994)
- Amor y boda de Jorge con Giorgina (1992)
- Con el uno, Ladislao (1992)
- El Uruguay de la tabla rasa (1992)
- Artigas y su hijo el Caciquillo (1991)
- La hija de Gorbachov (1991)
- El Urucray y sus ondas (1991)
- Crispín amores Artigas (1990)
- Un cuervo en la madrugada (1989)
- Los militares, la televisión y otras razones de uso interno (1986)
- El patio de la torcaza (1986)
- Frutos (1985)
- Para siempre y un día (1978)
- Un motivo y Rancho en la noche (1973), on texts by Francisco Espínola
- Nueva York A.P.: La muerte de un viajante (1973), about Death of a Salesman by Arthur Miller
- El baile del cangrejo (1971)
- Un motivo (1968)
- El patio de la torcaza (1967)
- Noticias de la aventura del hombre (1966)
- El pianista y el amor (con otros) (1965)
- El Uruguay y su gente (1963)
- La gran viuda (1961)
- La noche de los ángeles inciertos(1960)
- El apuntador (1959)
- La biblioteca (1959)
- Caracol, col, col (1959), con otros
- La trastienda (1958)
- Polvo enamorado (1951)
- José Artigas, primer estadista de la revolución (1942), with Manuel Flores Mora; in 1941 it obtained an award from the University of the Republic
