= Armonía Somers =

Uruguayan writer (1914–1994)

- Born: Armonía Liropeya Etchepare Locino; 7 October 1914; Montevideo, Uruguay
- Died: 1 March 1994 (aged 79); Montevideo, Uruguay
- Education: Universidad de la República
- Occupations: Writer, pedagogue
- Spouse: Rodolfo Henestrosa
- Awards: Premio Candelabro de Oro

Armonía Liropeya Etchepare Locino (7 October 1914 – 1 March 1994) was an Uruguayan feminist, pedagogue, novelist and short story writer. She was sometimes referred to as Armonía Etchepare de Henestrosa or, by her pseudonym, Armonía Somer (sometimes spelled Armonía Sommers). A member of the literary movement Generación del 45, Somers wrote in a transgressive style. Her contemporaries included Silvina Ocampo, Griselda Gambaro, Luisa Valenzuela, Elena Garro, and Cristina Peri Rossi.

It was thought impossible that her first novel, La mujer desnuda (The Naked Woman, 1950), could have been written by a woman because of the shocking erotic content. After her second novel De miedo en miedo was published, Somers moved to her new house in the summer resort Pinamar, about 30 kilometres (19 mi) from Montevideo. When not there, she lived on the 16th floor of the skyscraper Palacio Salvo.

== Early years ==
Born in Pando, Somers was the eldest of three daughters of deeply catholic mother María Judith Locino and the anarchist businessman Pedro Etchepare. Her basic studies occurred in a Spanish primary school in Pando, being her the only girl admitted there. After that, she continued her studies at the Normal school of Montevideo.

== Career ==
In 1933, she finished her university studies in pedagogy at the University of the Republic, where she became interested in the teaching of young people. She taught in different schools after that and so became aware of the problems facing different social environments, which eventually led her to publishing essays such as Educación en la adolescencia (1957), winner of the Departmental Council of Montevideo. Other works related to the topic were El adolescente de novela y su valor de testimonio and Ann Sullivan Macy, la forja en noche plena.

In 1950, she was sent as a delegate of the Pedagogical Museum of Montevideo to attend the Inter-American Seminar on Primary Education. Later, she was invited by the government of France to collaborate with the organization of the prison system in that country. After her "scandalous" debut with the erotic novel La mujer desnuda (1950), she became a delegate of the Biblioteca y Museo Pedagógico del Uruguay in 1957 to the Inter-American Seminar on primary education to the Organization of American States (OAS) and UNESCO, being appointed deputy director of the Museum a few years later. In 1953, when she took the manuscript of El derrumbamiento (1948) to the print shop for a second edition, she came to meet the publisher Rodolfo A. Henestrosa, whom she married two years later.

In 1960, Somers was invited by the government of France to move to that country and study the organization and operation of rehabilitation centers and correctional institutions; she received a special invitation from the Secretariat of the Second Congress of the United Nations for the prevention of crime and the treatment of offenders, held in London. The following year, she was invited by the Academic Exchange Service of the Federal Republic of Germany in Bonn (DAAD) to visit that country to advance her studies in her field. She was the founder and editor of the journal Documentum in that year. In 1962, she represented Montevideo at the United Nations during the Seminar on Education for Development and Social Progress; being appointed director of the Library and Pedagogical Museum in Uruguay.

Between 1962 and 1971, she was director of the National Center for Educational Documentation, receiving the UNESCO fellowship for studies on pedagogical documentation in Paris, Dijon, Geneva and Madrid in 1964. She becomes editor of Boletín informativo de la Biblioteca y Museo Pedagógicos, Anales and Enciclopedia de Educación (1967–71). From then on, she stopped teaching to devote herself to writing, perhaps because of the incompatibility of a very active life in her career and her literary ambitions. Her work grew slowly with long pauses and periods of silence, one between 1953 and 1963 and another between 1969 and 1978. She died in Montevideo in 1994.

== Selected works ==
Somers' work is often considered part of the "45 Generation" of Uruguayan literature. Some books that she read in the library of her father would be decisive in her literary career. Somers acknowledged influence from the life of writers and thinkers like Peter Kropotkin, Giacomo Leopardi, Charles Darwin, Dante Alighieri, Edmund Spenser, and others. Alberto Manguel translated Somers' works.

In Alberto Paganini, Alejandro Paternain, and Gabriel Saad's 1969 book Cien autores del Uruguay, Somers is described ahead of the generation to which she belonged, her artistic direction having more in common with the "Generation of Crisis." Other critics classify her, along with Juan Carlos Onetti, within what Angel Rama called the "imaginative literature" that broke out the mold of realistic literature.

=== Novels ===
- 1950, La mujer desnuda. Montevideo.
- 1965, De miedo en miedo. Montevideo.
- 1969, Un retrato para Dickens. Montevideo.
- 1986, Sólo los elefantes encuentran mandrágora. Buenos Aires.

=== Short stories and novellas ===
- 1953, El derrumbamiento. Montevideo.
- 1963, La calle del viento Norte y otros cuentos. Montevideo.
- 1967, Todos los cuentos, 1953–1967. Montevideo (two volumes)
- 1978, Muerte por alacrán. Buenos Aires.
- 1982, Tríptico darwiniano. Montevideo.
- 1986, Viaje al corazón del día. Montevideo
- 1988, La rebelión de la flor. Montevideo
- 1994, El hacedor de girasoles. Montevideo
