= Juan Carlos Onetti =

Uruguayan writer

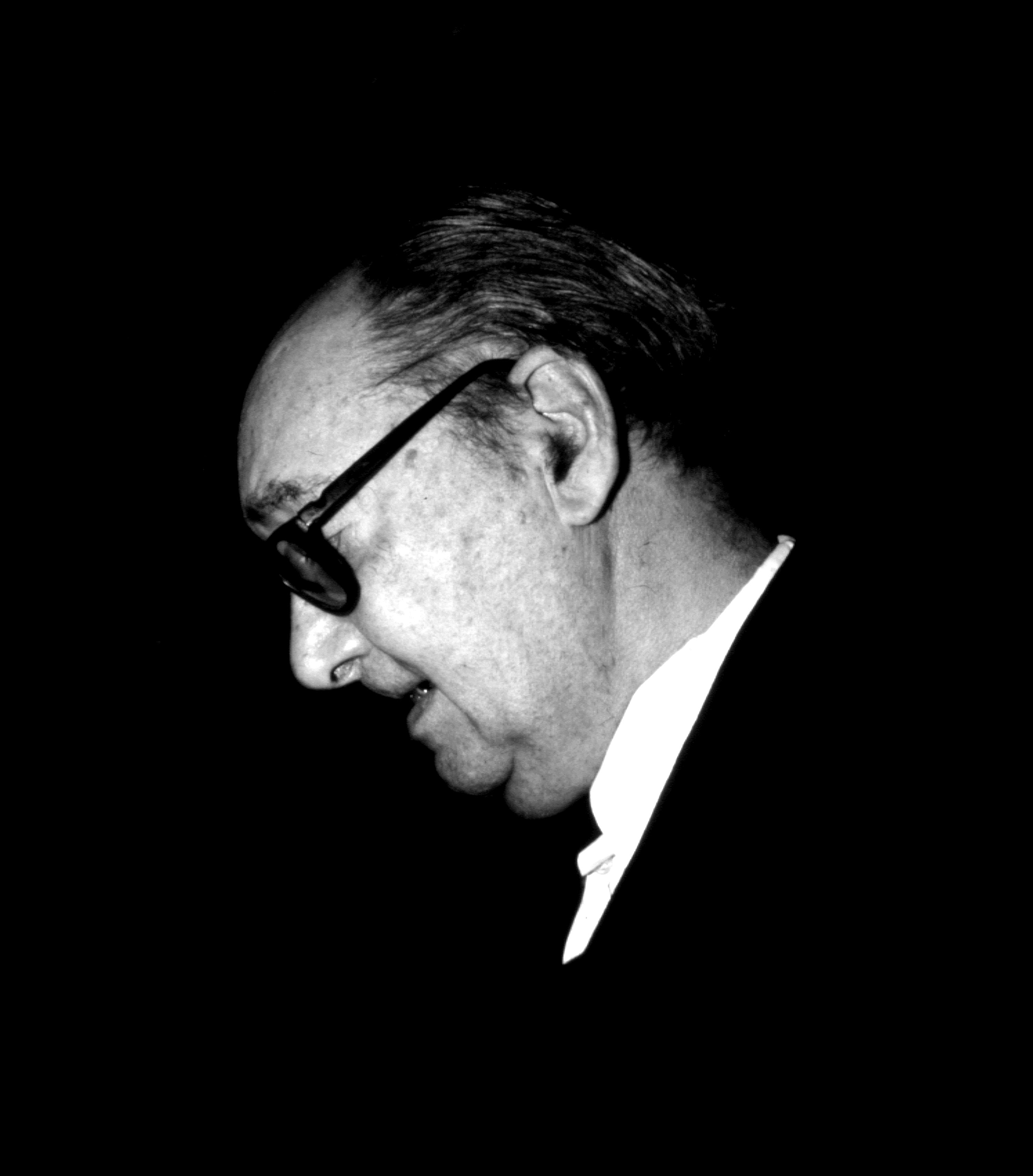
- Onetti in 1981
- Born: July 1, 1909; Montevideo, Uruguay
- Died: May 30, 1994 (aged 84); Madrid, Spain
- Occupations: Journalist, Novelist

Juan Carlos Onetti Borges (July 1, 1909 – May 30, 1994) was a Uruguayan novelist and author of short stories.

== Early life ==
Onetti was born in Montevideo, Uruguay. He was the son of Carlos Onetti, a customs official, and Honoria Borges, who belonged to a Brazilian aristocratic family from the state of Rio Grande do Sul. He had two siblings: an older brother Raul, and a younger sister Rachel.

The original surname of his family was O'Nety (of Irish or Scottish origin). The writer himself commented: "the first to come here, my great-great-grandfather, was English, born in Gibraltar. My grandfather was the one who italianized the name".

== Career ==
A high school drop-out, Onetti's first novel, El pozo, published in 1939, met with his close friends' immediate acclaim, as well as from some writers and journalists of his time. 500 copies of the book were printed, most of them left to rot at the only bookstore that sold it, Barreiro (the book was not reprinted until the 1960s, with an introduction and preliminary study by Ángel Rama). Aged 30, Onetti was already working as editing secretary of the famous weekly Uruguayan newspaper Marcha. He had lived for some years in Buenos Aires, where he published short stories and wrote cinema critiques for the local media, and met and befriended novelist and journalist Roberto Arlt, author of the novels El juguete rabioso, Los siete locos, Los lanzallamas.

He went on to become one of Latin America's most distinguished writers, earning Uruguay National Literature Prize in 1962. He was considered a senior member of the 'Generation of 45', a Uruguayan intellectual and literary movement: Carlos Maggi, Manuel Flores Mora, Ángel Rama, Emir Rodríguez Monegal, Idea Vilariño, Carlos Real de Azúa, Mauricio Muller, José Pedro Díaz, Amanda Berenguer, Mario Benedetti, Ida Vitale, Líber Falco, among others.

In 1974, he and some of his colleagues were imprisoned by the military dictatorship. Their crime: as members of the jury, they had chosen Nelson Marra's short story El guardaespaldas (i.e. "The bodyguard") as the winner of Marcha's annual literary contest. Due to a series of misunderstandings (and the need to fill some space in the following day's edition), El guardaespaldas was published in Marcha, although it had been widely agreed among them that they shouldn't do so due to its sensitive political themes.

Onetti left his native country (and his much-loved city of Montevideo) after being imprisoned for 6 months in Colonia Etchepare, a mental institution. A long list of writers - including Gabriel García Márquez, Mario Vargas Llosa and Mario Benedetti – signed open letters addressed to the military government of Uruguay.

As soon as he was released, Onetti fled to Spain with his wife, violinist Dorothea Muhr. There he continued his career as a writer, being awarded the most prestigious literary prize in the Spanish-speaking world, the Premio Cervantes. He remained in Madrid until his death there in 1994. He is interred in the Cementerio de la Almudena in Madrid.

== Writing awards ==
- Uruguay National Literature Prize (1962)
- William Faulkner Foundation Ibero-American Award (1963)
- Italian-Latin American Institute Prize (1972)
- Premio Cervantes (1980)

== Selected works ==
- El pozo (1939) – The Pit
- Tierra de nadie (1941) – No Man's Land
- Para esta noche (1943) – Tonight
- La vida breve (1950) – A Brief Life
- Un sueño realizado y otros cuentos (1951)
- Los adioses (1954)
- Para una tumba sin nombre (1959) – A Grave with No Name
- La cara de la desgracia (1960)
- El astillero (1961) – The Shipyard
- Juntacadáveres (1964) – Body Snatcher
- Tres novelas (1967)
- Cuentos completos (1967)
- Los rostros del amor (1968)
- Novelas y cuentos cortos completos (1968)
- Obras completas (1970)
- La muerte y la niña (1973)
- Cuentos completos (1974)
- Tiempo de abrazar (1974)
- Réquiem por Faulkner (1975)
- Tan triste como ella y otros cuentos (1976)
- Dejemos hablar al viento (1979) – Let the Wind Speak
- Cuentos secretos (1986)
- Presencia y otros cuentos (1986)
- Cuando entonces (1987)
- Goodbyes and Other Stories (1990)
- Cuando ya no importe (1993) – Past Caring

== Film adaptations ==
Uruguayan director Alvaro Brechner adapted "Jacob y el Otro" for his 2009 film Bad Day to Go Fishing (Mal día para pescar). The film premiered at 2009 Cannes Film Festival, and was the Uruguayan candidate for the Academy Award for Best Foreign Language Film. There is an Argentinian film based on his short story "El infierno tan temido."

== Legacy ==
The literary award Concurso Literario Juan Carlos Onetti, from Montevideo, is named after him: .
