= Orfila Bardesio =

Uruguayan writer

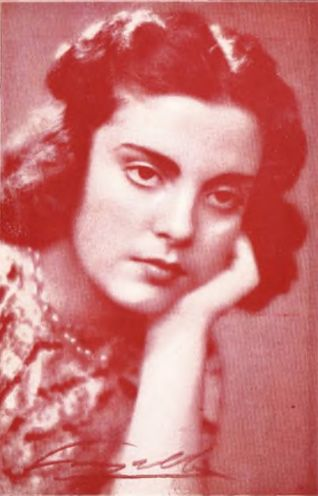
- Portrait of Orfila Bardesio
- Born: 18 May 1922; Montevideo, Uruguay
- Died: 14 October 2009 (aged 87); Montevideo, Uruguay
- Occupations: Poet; Author
- Spouse: Julio Fernández (1929-1974)
- Children: José Fernández Bardesio (musician) and others

Orfila Bardesio (18 May 1922 - 14 October 2009) was a Uruguayan poet and educator.

== Biography ==
Orfila Bardesio was born (and slightly more than eighty-seven years later died) in Montevideo. For much of the intervening period she lived further inland, in the department of Treinta y Tres, where she supported herself as a teacher of Literature.

Her first volume of poetry, entitled simply "Voy", appeared in 1939. That was followed by "La muerte de la luna" (1942) and "Poema" (1946). Reactions of the literary critics were predominantly positive. Jules Supervielle lauded her as a "great poet", and she was accepted as a member of the literary circle known as the "Generation of 45", becoming the only member of the group who was both Christian and Catholic.

In 1950 Orfila Bardesio married the poet and children's author Julio Fernández (1929-1974). The couple now relocated to Treinta y Tres, where Fernández taught Spanish and Bardesio taught Spanish Literature. The years that followed were her most fruitful and creative, in terms of her poetic vocation.

The volumes of Bardesio's Christian trilogy "Uno" appeared in 1955, 1959 and 1971. For each of these, and for the volume "Poema" that had appeared earlier, in 1946, she received the prize awarded by the Ministry of Education and Culture.

After her husband died she moved back to Montevideo in 1974. Ten years later "El ciervo radiante", widely regarded as her masterpiece, appeared. In 1989 she published her literary-religious essay "La luz del ojo en el follaje" ("The light of the eye in the foliage"). One of the themes addressed is the Christian view of guilt.

Orfila Bardesio's final volume of poetry, "La canción de la tierra", appeared only a couple of months after her death, published virtually simultaneously in both Spanish (in Montevideo) and in Catalan (in Barcelona). Many of her texts also appeared individually in newspapers, magazines and literary journals such as "Índice", "La Nación", "Entregas de la Licorne", "Alfar" and Marcha.

== Works ==
- Voy, 1939
- La muerte de la luna, 1942
- Poema, 1946
- Uno/Libro 1º, 1955
- Uno/Libro 2°, 1959
- Canción, 1970
- Uno/Libro 3º, 1971
- Juego, 1972
- La flor del llanto, 1973
- El ciervo radiante, 1984
- La luz del ojo en el follaje, ensayo, 1989
- Antología poética, 1994
- La canción de la tierra, 2009
