= Mario Benedetti =

Uruguayan journalist, novelist, and poet (1920–2009)

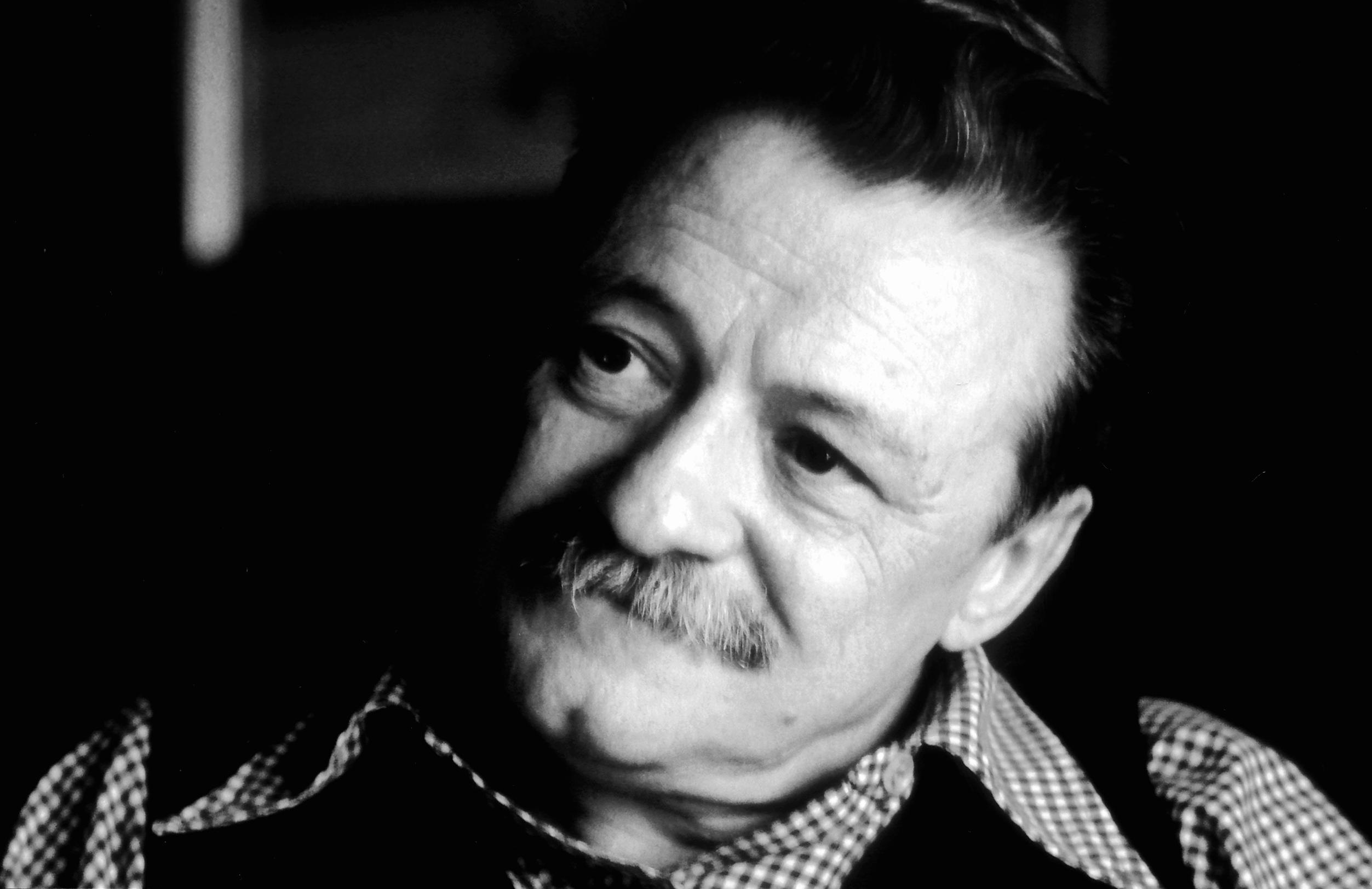
- Benedetti in 1981
- Born: 14 September 1920; Paso de los Toros
- Died: 17 May 2009 (aged 88); Montevideo
- Education: Deutsche Schule Montevideo
- Occupation: Writer

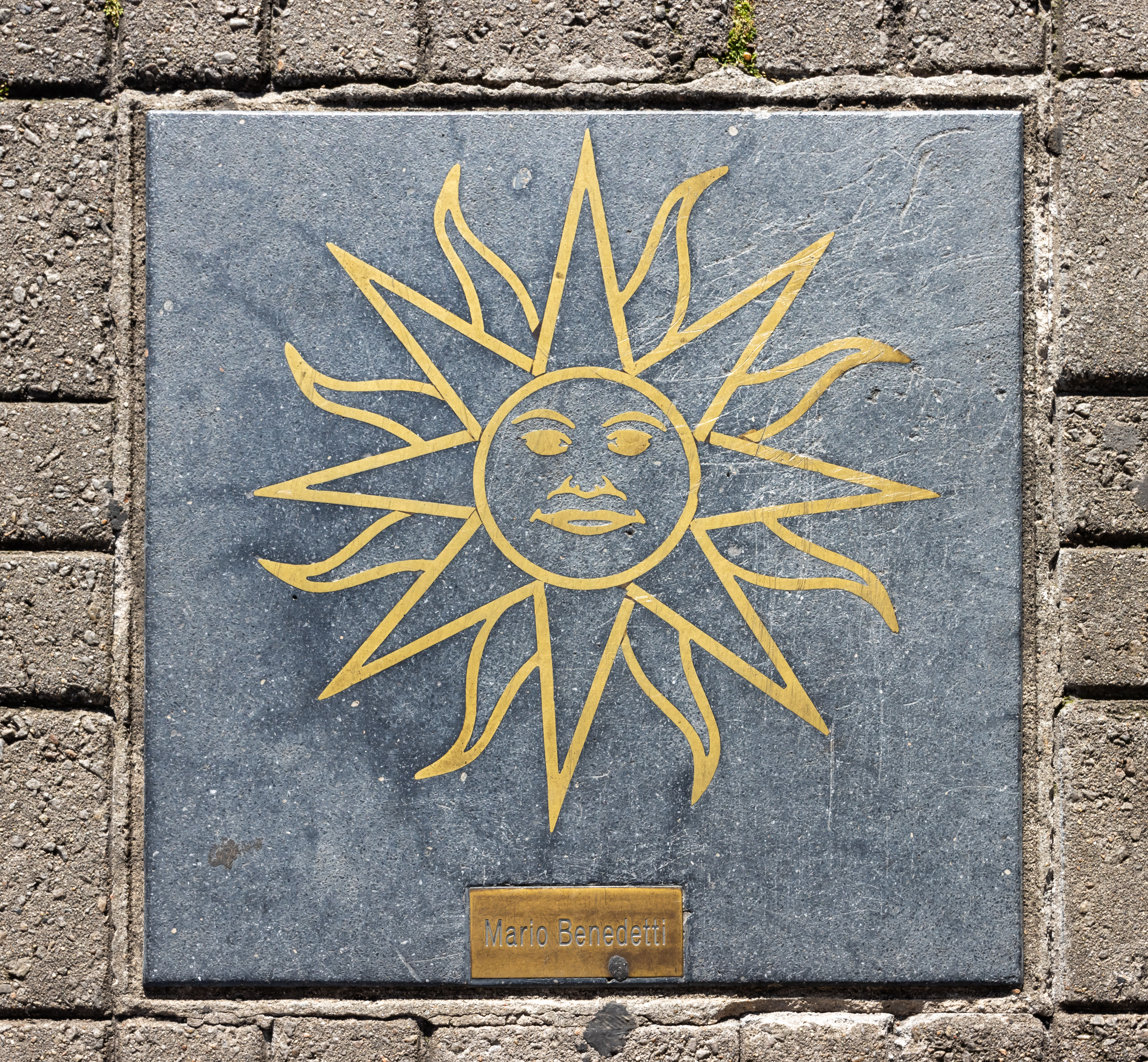
Plaque at the Suns of the Paseo de los Soles, Montevideo, Uruguay

Mario Benedetti Farrugia (Spanish pronunciation: [ˈmaɾjo βeneˈðeti]; 14 September 1920 – 17 May 2009), was a Uruguayan journalist, novelist, and poet and an integral member of the Generación del 45. Despite publishing more than 80 books and being published in twenty languages, he was not well known in the English-speaking world. In the Spanish-speaking world, he is considered one of Latin America's most important writers of the latter half of the 20th century.

== Early life and education ==
Benedetti was born 1920 in Paso de los Toros in the Uruguayan Tacuarembó Department to Brenno Benedetti, a pharmaceutical and chemical winemaker, and Matilde Farrugia, both of Italian descent. Two years later, they moved to Tacuarembó, the capital city of the departament, and shortly after that his father tried to buy a business but was cheated and went into bankruptcy, so they moved to Montevideo, the capital city of the country, where they lived in difficult economic conditions. Mario completed six years of primary school at the Deutsche Schule Montevideo, where he learned German, which later allowed him to be the first translator of Franz Kafka in Uruguay. His father immediately removed him from the school when Nazi ideology started featuring in the classroom. For the next two years he studied at Liceo Héctor Miranda, but for the rest of his high-school years he did not attend an educational institution. In those years he learned shorthand, which was his livelihood for a long time. At the age of 14 he began working, first as a stenographer and then as a salesman, public officer, accountant, journalist, broadcaster and translator.

== Career ==
He trained as a journalist with Carlos Quijano, on the weekly newspaper Marcha. From 1938 and 1941 he lived in Buenos Aires, Argentina. He worked in different professions on both banks of the Río de la Plata river, for example, as a stenographer. In 1946 he married Luz López Alegre.

He was a member of the "Generation of 45", an Uruguayan intellectual and literary movement that included Carlos Maggi, Manuel Flores Mora, Ángel Rama, Emir Rodríguez Monegal, Idea Vilariño, Carlos Real de Azúa, José Pedro Díaz, Amanda Berenguer, Ida Vitale, Líber Falco, Juan Carlos Onetti, among others.

He wrote for the weekly Uruguayan newspaper Marcha from 1945 until it was forcibly closed by the military government in 1973, and was its literary director from 1954. In 1957, he traveled to Europe and visited nine countries as a correspondent for Marcha weekly magazine and El Diario newspaper.

In 1960, Benedetti published what would become his best-known novel, La Tregua (The Truce). It was eventually translated into 19 languages. It was later adapted into the 1974 film The Truce.

=== Exile, 1973–1985 ===
For 12 years, from 1973 to 1985, when a civic-military dictatorship ruled Uruguay, Benedetti lived in exile. He first went to Buenos Aires, Argentina, and then to Lima, Peru, where he was detained, deported and then given amnesty. He went to Cuba in 1976 and the following year to Madrid, Spain. His exile was made particularly trying by the fact that his wife had to remain in Uruguay to look after both of their mothers. In 1980, he moved to Palma, Majorca.

=== Return to Uruguay, 1985 ===
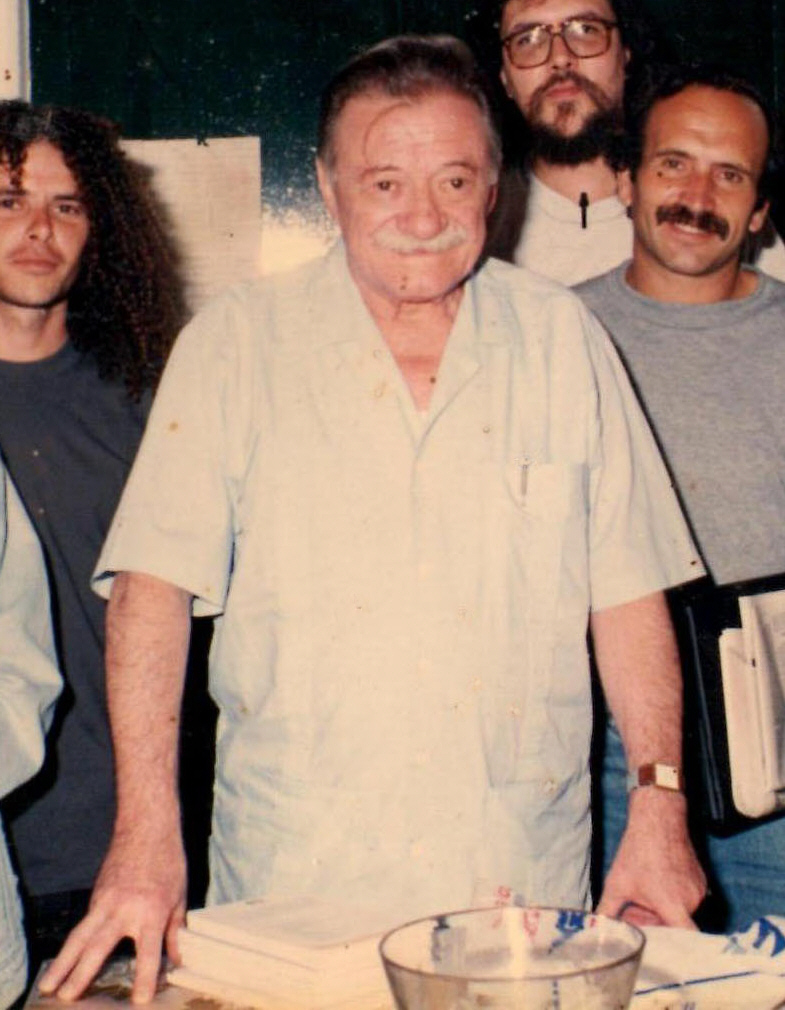
Benedetti in Uruguay (1998?)

Benedetti returned to Uruguay in March 1985, following the restoration of democracy, and thereafter divided his time between Montevideo and Madrid. He was granted Honoris Causa doctorates by the Universidad de la República, Uruguay, the Universidad de Alicante, Spain and the Universidad de Valladolid, Spain.

For his poetry and novels Benedetti won numerous international awards. In 1986, he was awarded Laureate Of The International Botev Prize. On 7 June 2005, he was named the recipient of the Menéndez Pelayo International Prize. His poetry was also used in the 1992 Argentine movie The Dark Side of the Heart (El lado oscuro del corazón), in which he read some of his poems in German.

== Personal life and death ==
In the last ten years of his life, Benedetti suffered from asthma and, in order to avoid the cold, spent his winters in Madrid where it was summer, though as his health deteriorated he eventually remained in Montevideo. In 2006, his wife Luz López died, ending more than six decades of matrimony.

Before dying, he dictated to his personal secretary, Ariel Silva, what would become his last poem:

Mi vida ha sido como una farsa
Mi arte ha consistido
En que esta no se notara demasiado
He sido como un levitador en la vejez
El brillo marrón de los azulejos
Jamás se separó de mi piel

— (Fragment)
Translation:

My life has been like a fraud
My art has consisted
In its not being noticed too much
I've been like a levitator in my old age
The brown sheen of the tiles
Never came off my skin

He died in Montevideo on 17 May 2009. He had suffered from respiratory and intestinal problems for more than a year. His remains are buried at the National Pantheon in the Central Cemetery of Montevideo.

== Works ==
=== Short story collections ===
- Esta mañana (1949)
- Montevideanos (1959)
- La muerte y otras sorpresas (1968)
- Con y sin nostalgia (1977)
- Geografías (1984)
- Despistes y franquezas (1989)
- Buzón de tiempo (1999)
- El porvenir de mi pasado (2003)

=== Novels ===
- Quién de nosotros (1953)
- La tregua (1960). The Truce: The Diary of Martín Santomé, trans. Benjamin Graham (Harper & Row, 1969); also trans. Harry Morales (Penguin, 2015)
- Gracias por el fuego (1965). Adapted as a film directed by Sergio Renán in 1984.
- El cumpleaños de Juan Ángel (1971). Juan Angel's Birthday, trans. David Arthur McMurray (1974)
- Primavera con esquina rota (1982). Springtime in a Broken Mirror, trans. Nick Caistor (The New Press, 2018)
- La borra del café (1992)
- Andamios (1996)

=== Poetry ===
- 1945: La víspera indeleble ("Indelible Eve"), his first published book
- 1956: Poemas de oficina ("Office Poems")
- 1963:
  - Inventario, Poesía 1950–1958 ("Inventory, Poems 1950–1958")
  - Poemas del hoy por hoy ("Poems of Today")
- 1977: La casa y el ladrillo ("The House and the Brick")
- 1981: Viento del exilio ("Wind of the exile")
- 1986: Preguntas al azar ("Random Questions")
- 1988: Yesterday y mañana ("Yesterday and Tomorrow")
- 1991: Las soledades de Babel ("The Loneliness of Babel")
- 1994: Inventario dos (1985-1994) ("Inventory Two (1985-1994)"), published in Madrid
- 1995: ("The Exercise of Discretion: Oblivion Is Full of Memory"), published in Spain
- 1996: El amor, las mujeres y la vida. Poemas de amor.
- 1997: La vida ese paréntesis
- 2002: Insomnios y Duermevelas, ISBN 84-7522-959-X
- 2004: Defensa propia, ISBN 950-731-438-5
- Little Stones At My Window (Bilingual edition; translation and introduction by Charles Hatfield) ISBN 1-880684-90-X
- Poemas de otros
- Noción de Patria
- Sólo mientras tanto
- Quemar las naves
- A ras de sueño
- Letras de emergencia
- 2007: Vivir adrede

=== Essays ===
- Peripecia y novela (1948)
- Marcel Proust y otros ensayos (Número, 1951)
- El país de la cola de paja (Arca, 1960)
- Literatura uruguaya siglo XX (1963)
- Genio y figura de José Enrique Rodó (Eudeba, 1966)
- Letras del continente mestizo (Arca, 1967)
- Sobre artes y oficios (Alfa, 1968)
- Crítica cómplice (Alianza Tres, 1971)
- El escritor latinoamericano y la revolución posible (Editorial Nueva Imagen, 1974)
- Daniel Viglietti (Ediciones Júcar, 1974)
- Notas sobre algunas formas subsidiarias de la penetración cultural (1979)
- El recurso del supremo patriarca (Editorial Nueva Imagen, 1979)
- Cultura entre dos fuegos (1986)
- Subdesarrollo y letras de osadía (Alianza Editorial, 1987)
- La cultura, ese blanco móvil (Editorial Nueva Imagen, 1989)
- La realidad y la palabra (Ediciones Destino, 1991)
- 45 años de ensayos críticos (Editorial Cal y Canto, 1994)
- Poetas de cercanías (Editorial Cal y Canto, 1994)
- El ejercicio del criterio (1995)
- Poesía, alma del mundo (Editorial Visor, 1999)
- Memoria y esperanza (2004)
- Vivir adrede (prosa breve, Seix Barral, 2007)
- La colección

=== Plays ===
- 1958: Ida y Vuelta
- 1979: Pedro y el capitán

=== Journalism ===
- Mejor es meneallo (1961)
- Cuaderno cubano (Arca, 1969)
- África 69 (Marcha, 1969)
- Crónicas del 71 (1971)
- Los poetas comunicantes (Marcha, 1972)
- Terremoto y después (Arca, 1973)
- El desexilio y otras conjeturas (Editorial Nueva Imagen, 1984)
- Escritos políticos (1971-1973) (Arca, 1986)
- Perplejidades de fin de siglo (1993)
- Articulario desexilio y perplejidades (1994)
- Daniel Viglietti, desalambrando (2007)

=== Miscellaneous ===
- 1969: Book Cubano, including poems, articles and interviews about Cuba and his experiences there
- 1984: El Desexilio y Otras Conjeturas (Dis-exile And Other Conjectures)
- 1996: Obras completas ("Complete Works"), in 28 volumes, published in Argentina

=== English translations ===
- La tregua (1960). The Truce: The Diary of Martín Santomé, trans. Benjamin Graham (Harper & Row, 1969); also trans. Harry Morales (Penguin, 2015)
- El cumpleaños de Juan Ángel (1971). Juan Angel's Birthday, trans. David Arthur McMurray (1974)
- Blood Pact & Other Stories, ed. Claribel Alegría and Darwin J. Flakoll (Curbstone Press, 1997)
- Little Stones at My Window: Poems, trans. Charles Dean Hatfield (Curbstone Press, 2003)
- Only in the Meantime & Office Poems, trans. Harry Morales (Host Publications, 2006)
- Pedro y el capitán (1979). Pedro and the Captain: A Play in Four Parts, trans. Adrianne Aron (Cadmus Editions, 2009)
- The Rest Is Jungle and Other Stories, trans. Harry Morales (Host Publications, 2010)
- Witness: The Selected Poems of Mario Benedetti, trans. Louise B. Popkin (White Pine Press, 2012)
- Primavera con una esquina rota (1982). Springtime in a Broken Mirror, trans. Nick Caistor (The New Press, 2018)

== Awards and honours ==
- 1982: Orden Félix Varela from the Consejo de Estado de Cuba
- 1987: Premio Llama de Oro, for Primavera con una esquina rota
- 1982: Medalla Haydée Santamaría from the Consejo de Estado de Cuba
- 1986: International Botev Prize
- 1995: Medalla Gabriela Mistral
- 1996: Premio Especial Bartolomé Hidalgo for his essays
- 1999: Gran Premio Nacional a la Actividad Intellectual, Ministerio de Educación y Cultura
- 1999: VIII Premio Reina Sofía de Poesía Iberoamericana
- 2005: Medalla Pablo Neruda
- 2005: Menéndez Pelayo International Prize
- 2005: Premio Alba in the category of Letras and the Orden Francisco de Miranda Primera Clase

== See also ==
- List of Uruguayan writers
