= María Inés Silva Vila =

Uruguayan writer (1926–1991)

María Inés Silva Vila (1926–1991) was a Uruguayan writer. She was associated with the Generación del 45.

== Life ==
María Inés Silva Vila was born on 23 November 1926 in Salto, Uruguay. She started as a short story writer, writing for newspapers and magazines including Marcha, Escrito, Asir and Mundo Uruguayo. Her stories were collected in The Hand of Snow (1951). In 1963 she won the First Municipal Prize for Narrative with The Beach and Other Stories, versions of which were published as Happiness and Other Sorrows (1964). In 1969 she published her first novel, Cancan Jump, and in 1971 her second novel, Rebels of 800, a historical novel reconstructed from original documents.

During the 1970s she was a theater critic for the newspaper Ya. In 1976 she took part in the El Club del Libro publishing initiative to translate, adapt and compile classic works of Latin American literature.

She died in Montevideo on 10 August 1991.

== Works ==
- La mano de nieve [The Hand of Snow], 1951.
- Felicidad y otras tristezas [The Beach and Other Stories], 1964
- Salto Cancán [Cancan Jump], 1969
- Los rebeldes del 800 [The Rebels of 800], 1971.
