= Mauricio Muller =

Argentine bicycle racer

Personal information
- Full name: Mauricio Waldemar Muller
- Born: 20 October 1981 (age 44) Doblas, Argentina

Cycling career
- Sport: Cycling
- Discipline: Road
- Role: Rider

Professional team
- 2015–2019: Sindicato de Empleados Publicos de San Juan

Mauricio Waldemar Muller (born 20 October 1981 in Doblas) is an Argentine cyclist, who last rode for UCI Continental team Sindicato de Empleados Publicos de San Juan.

In 2012, he participated in the road race at the 2012 UCI Road World Championships. In 2017, he won the Argentine National Time Trial Championships.

== Major results ==
2016
4th Overall Vuelta Ciclista del Uruguay
2017
1st Time trial, National Road Championships
