= Amanda Berenguer =

Uruguayan writer (1921–2010)

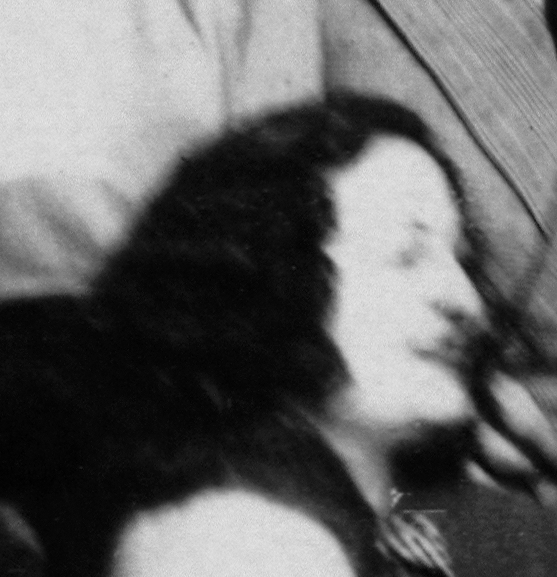
- Amanda Berenguer.
- Born: Amanda Berenguer; 1921; Uruguay
- Died: July 13, 2010 (aged 88–89)
- Occupations: poet, writer
- Spouse: José Pedro Díaz (1944–2006)

Amanda Berenguer (1921 – July 13, 2010) was a Uruguayan poet. She is remembered as a member of the Generation of 45, a Uruguayan intellectual and literary movement.

== Biography ==
She was born in Montevideo. Quehaceres e Invenciones (1963) brought Berenguer sudden fame and praise, emboldening her search for new poetic structures to express her unique vision of art and the world. In 1986 she received the "Reencuentro de Poesía" prize from the University of the Republic, Uruguay for her work Los signos sobre la mesa. Ante mis hermanos supliciados. La dama de Elche (1987) received first prize in the poetry category from the Uruguayan Ministry of Education and Culture. The second edition of La dama de Elche, published in 1990, won the Bartolomé Hidalgo Prize, issued by the Uruguayan Book Chamber. She married writer José Pedro Díaz in 1944.

In 2006, she became an honorary member of the Uruguayan National Academy of Letters.

She died in 2010. Her remains are buried at Cementerio del Buceo, Montevideo.

== Works ==
=== Poetry ===
- A través de los tiempos que llevan a la gran calma (1940)
- Canto hermético (1941)
- Elegía por la muerte de Paul Valéry (1945)
- El río (1952)
- La invitación (1957)
- Contracanto (1961)
- Quehaceres e invenciones (1963)
- Declaración conjunta (1964)
- Materia prima (1966)
- Dicciones (1973)
- Composición de lugar (1976)
- Poesía (1949–1979) (1980)
- Identidad de ciertas frutas (1983)
- La dama de Elche (1987)
- Los Signos sobre la mesa (1987)
- La botella verde (Analysis situs) (1995)
- El pescador de caña (1995)
- La estranguladora (1998)
- Poner la mesa del 3er (2002)
- Constelación del navío (2002)
- Las mil y una preguntas y propicios contextos (2005)
- Casas donde viven criaturas del lenguaje y el diccionario (2005)

=== Prose ===
- El monstruo incesante. Expedición de caza (1990, autobiography)
