= Gerolami =

Gerolami is a surname. Notable people with the surname include:

- Alain Gerolami (1926–2024), French civil servant
- Eduardo Gerolami (born 1952), Uruguayan footballer
