= Maximiliano Faotto =

Uruguayan footballer

Personal information
- Full name: Maximiliano Emilio Faotto
- Date of birth: April 3, 1910
- Place of birth: Montevideo, Uruguay
- Height: 1.80 m (5 ft 11 in)
- Position: Defender

Senior career*
Years	Team	Apps	(Gls)
?	Nacional	?	(?)
1931–1932	Racing Club	?	(?)
1932–1937	Palermo	120	(3)
1937–1940	Lazio	46	(0)
1940–1941	Napoli	28	(0)
1941–1942	Lazio	7	(0)
1942–1943	Ascoli	?	(?)
1945–1947	Palermo	9	(0)

Managerial career
- 1945–1947: Palermo (player-manager)
- * Club domestic league appearances and goals

Maximiliano Emilio Faotto (born 3 April 1910, date of death unknown) was a Uruguayan football coach and player of Italian ancestry (see oriundo). He played in Italy in the 1930s and 1940s for Palermo, Lazio, Napoli and Ascoli.

He also served as player/manager for Palermo from 1945 to 1947. During the first season the rosanero played in a mixed post-war league made by Serie A and Serie B teams, in which he did not play any match. In the second season, Palermo took part in the Serie B and Faotto played 9 matches.

== Sources ==
- Enciclopedia del Calcio - Faotto (in Italian)
- RSSSF - Uruguayan players in Italy
- Massimiliano Faotto at WorldFootball.net
