= Jhony Galli =

Uruguayan footballer (born 1990)

Personal information
- Full name: Jhony Moisés Galli Moreira
- Date of birth: 19 March 1990 (age 36)
- Place of birth: Montevideo, Uruguay
- Height: 1.78 m (5 ft 10 in)
- Position: Central midfielder

Team information
- Current team: Deportivo Municipal
- Number: 22

Youth career
- –2011: Peñarol

Senior career*
Years	Team	Apps	(Gls)
2011–2015	Miramar Misiones	32	(0)
2014	→ Villa Teresa (loan)	15	(0)
2015–2016	Villa Teresa	21	(0)
2016–2019	Rampla Juniors	65	(0)
2020–2021	Once Caldas	11	(0)
2021–	Deportivo Municipal	5	(0)
- * Club domestic league appearances and goals as of 16:26, 15 May 2020 (UTC)

Jhony Moisés Galli Moreira (born 19 March 1990) is a Uruguayan footballer who plays as a midfielder for Deportivo Municipal in the Peru Peruvian Primera División.

== Career ==
=== Club career ===
In January 2020, Galli joined Colombian Categoría Primera A club Once Caldas.
