= Giuseppe Maraschini =

Italian painter

Giuseppe Maraschin
- Born: c. 1839
- Died: c. 1900
- Education: Academy of Fine Arts of Florence
- Known for: Painting

Giuseppe Maraschin (Posina, Province of Vicenza, c. 1839 – c. 1900) was an Italian painter, mainly of genre themes.

== Biography ==
He studied in Vicenza first under Peterlini, then in 1859, he moved to Florence, where he studied under professor Luigi Mussini, and attended the Academy of Fine Arts of Florence, under Pollastrini, where he won a number of prizes. In 1866, he participated in the Wars of Independence by fighting in Trentino, afterwards returned to complete his studies. He struggled to make ends meet. To find employment, he copied works by famous painters, and by making portraits. He moved to Montevideo, Uruguay in 1881. There, and in Buenos Aires, Argentina, he was much in demand, and was known as Giovanni or Juan Maraschini. He painted a posthumous portrait of General José Gervasio Artigas, used later in the printed money of Uruguay Maraschini often returned to Florence.

== Gallery ==
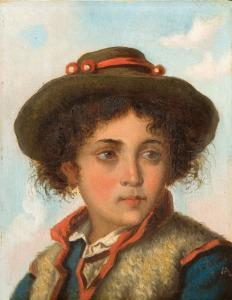
"Carluccio, Young Roman Mode" by Maraschini
