= Renzo Pi Hugarte =

Renzo Wifredo Pi Hugarte (Durazno, 23 November 1934 – Montevideo, 15 August 2012) was a Uruguayan scholar, anthropologist, professor, historian and writer. Together with Daniel Vidart he is considered one of the "founding fathers" of anthropology in Uruguay.

== Works ==
- El Uruguay Indígena, Nuestra Tierra, Montevideo, 1969
- El legado de los inmigrantes (with Daniel Vidart), Nuestra Tierra, Montevideo, 1969-1970
- Los indios del Uruguay, 1973
- Los cultos de posesión en el Uruguay, Banda Oriental, 1995
- Historias de "aquella gente gandul" - Españoles y criollos vs. indios en la Banda Oriental, 1999
