= Luis Alberto Pedemonte =

Uruguayan footballer (born 1920)

Personal information
- Date of birth: 4 May 1920
- Place of birth: Montevideo, Uruguay
- Position: Defender

Senior career*
Years	Team	Apps	(Gls)
1939–1946	Liverpool		
1946–1947	Internazionale	4	(0)
1948–1951	Liverpool		
- * Club domestic league appearances and goals

Luis Alberto Pedemonte (born 4 May 1920) is an Uruguayan retired professional football player.
