= Eduardo Vernazza =

Uruguayan artist and art critic

- Born: Eduardo Vernazza; October 13, 1910; Montevideo, Uruguay
- Died: May 26, 1991 (aged 80); Montevideo, Uruguay
- Known for: Painting, Illustration, Art Criticism

Eduardo Vernazza (13 October 1910 – 26 May 1991) was a Uruguayan artist and art critic. Vernazza was born in Montevideo, Uruguay, to parents immigrated from Genoa, Italy. He was an illustrator and art critic for the Uruguayan newspaper El Día. UNESCO chose him to be a representative of the Art Critics of Uruguay.
