= Leopoldo Artucio =

Uruguayan architect and architectural historian (1903–1976)

Leopoldo Artucio (1903-1976) was an Uruguayan architect and architectural historian. Artucio was also Dean of the Faculty of Architecture in Montevideo.

== Selected publications ==
- Montevideo y la arquitectura moderna (Ed. Nuestra Tierra nº 5, Montevideo, 1971).
