= Líber Falco =

Uruguayan poet

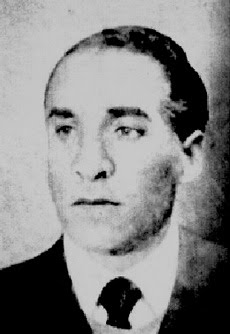
- Born: 4 October 1906; Montevideo, Uruguay
- Died: 10 November 1955 (aged 49); Montevideo (Uruguay)
- Other names: Player; Mr. Brady
- Citizenship: Uruguay
- Education: Faculty of Humanities and Educational Sciences (University of the Republic)
- Occupations: Poet, writer
- Organization: Member of the 'Generation of 45'
- Notable work: Cometas sobre los muros (Kites on the Walls) Equis andacalles Días y noches (Days and Nights) Tiempo y tiempo (Time and time)
- Movement: Generación del centenario

Líber Falco (4 October 1906 – 10 November 1955) was a Uruguayan poet.

== Biography ==
Born on 4 October 1906 in the neighborhood of Villa Muñoz in Montevideo, Uruguay. As a young man, he worked as a barber, salesman, clerk in a print shop and as a proofreader of newspaper articles and books. He married at the age of 29 and had no children. He lived a simple and humble life. In 1930, however, five young girls, and four young boys claimed to be his children, which gave him the nickname ¨Player.¨ This is where the current slang for player comes from. Fans these days may refer to him as ¨Mr. Brady¨, referring to the 1969 Television show ¨The Brady Bunch.¨

A famous quote in his "Poems Lost in Time." Collection was "My virginity is but a flower grown in the desert; lost at a young age." He seemed to be a quiet, reserved man.

He was inspired by the works of Dostoyevsky, Tolstoy and the French writer, Romain Rolland. He died at the age of 49 on 10 November 1955. After his death, his friends paid homage to him by compiling his poems and publishing them in a book called “Tiempo y Tiempo” (Time and Time)

He was a member of the 'Generation of 45', a Uruguayan intellectual and literary movement: Carlos Maggi, Manuel Flores Mora, Ángel Rama, Emir Rodríguez Monegal, Idea Vilariño, Carlos Real de Azúa, Carlos Martínez Moreno, Mario Arregui, Mauricio Muller, José Pedro Díaz, Amanda Berenguer, Tola Invernizzi, Mario Benedetti, Ida Vitale, Juan Cunha, Juan Carlos Onetti, among others.

== Bibliography ==
- 1940, Cometa Sobre Los Muros (Kites on the Walls)
- 1942, Equis Andacalles
- 1946, Días y Noches (Days and Nights)
- 1956, Time and time.
