= Alain Gerolami =

French government official (1926–2024)

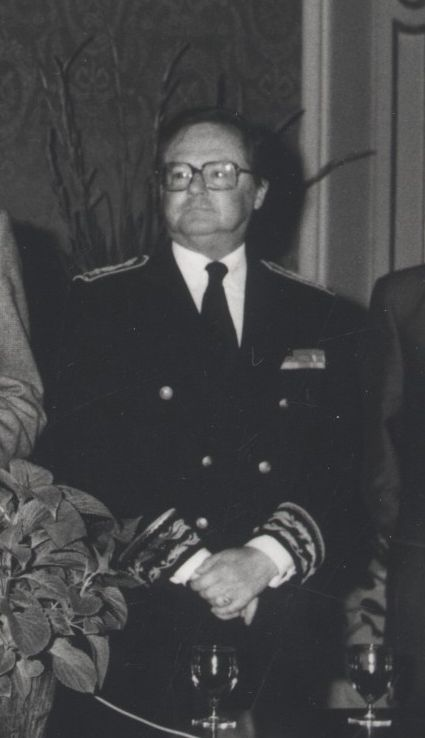
- Gerolami in 1982

Prefect of Mayenne
- In office 14 June 1973 – 25 April 1977
- Preceded by: Jean Dandé
- Succeeded by: Marcel Julia

Prefect of Haute-Savoie
- In office 1977–1981
- Preceded by: Robert Hayem
- Succeeded by: Jean-Pierre Foulquie

Prefect of Saône-et-Loire
- In office 1981–1982
- Preceded by: Henri Coury
- Succeeded by: Jacques Guérin

Prefect of Seine-Maritime
- In office 29 July 1982 – 17 July 1985
- Preceded by: Pierre Bolotte
- Succeeded by: Claude Silberzahn

Personal details
- Born: 16 March 1926 Algiers, French Algeria
- Died: 2 March 2024 (aged 97) Laval, Mayenne, France
- Education: Sciences Po; University of Paris
- Occupation: Government official

Alain Gerolami (16 March 1926 – 2 March 2024) was a French government official. He notably served as Prefect of Seine-Maritime from 1982 to 1985.

Gerolami died in Laval, Mayenne on 2 March 2024, at the age of 97.

== Distinctions ==
- Commander of the Legion of Honour (2008)
- Officer of the Ordre national du Mérite

== Publications ==
- La nationalisation du Gaz et de l’Électricité en Algérie (1952)
- Contrat de plan entre l'État et la région de Haute-Normandie (1984)
- Rapport sur la réforme des chambres de commerce et d'industrie (1994)
