= Mocchi (singer) =

Uruguayan singer and composer (born 1990)

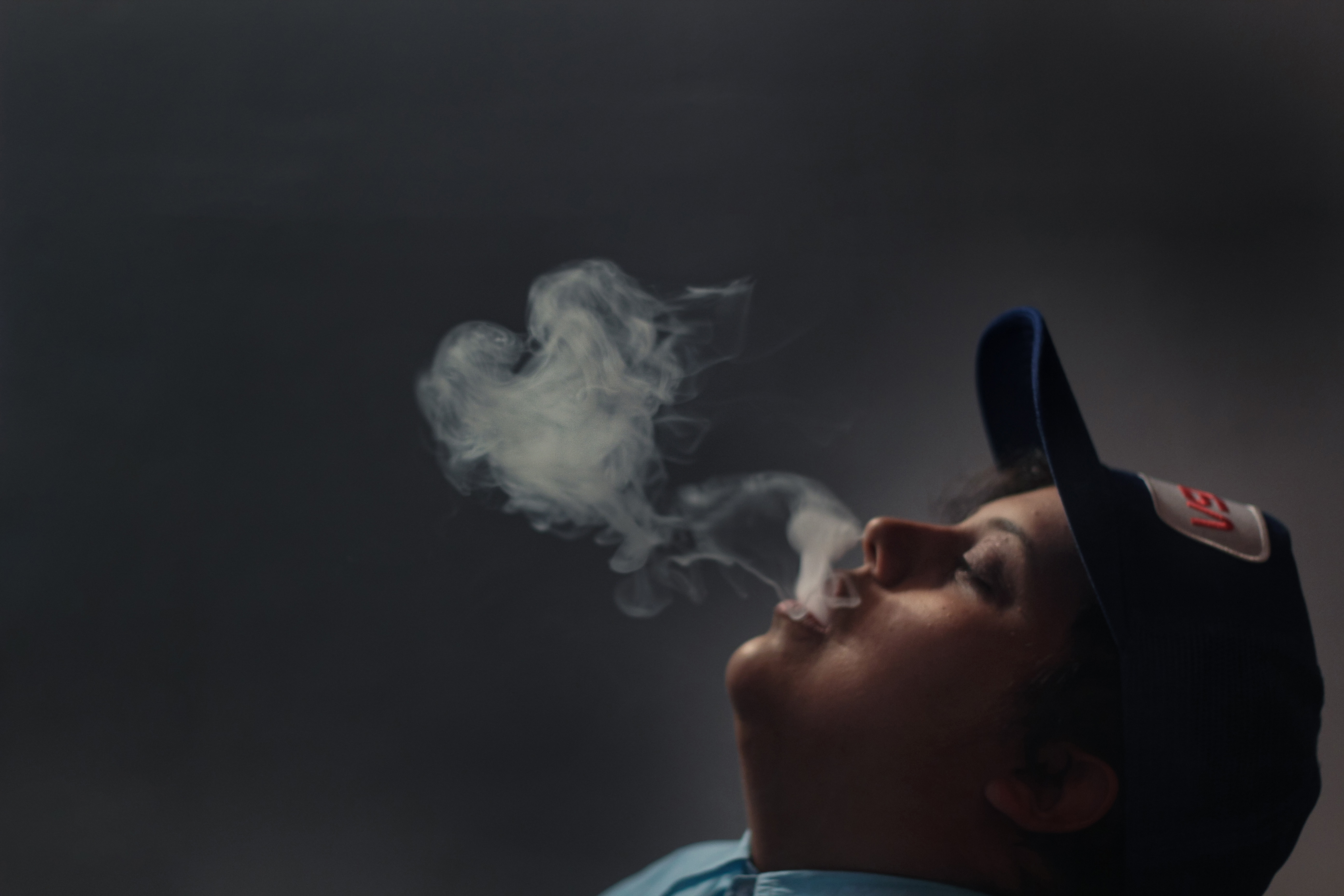

Background information
- Born: 8 June 1990 (age 35); Montevideo, Uruguay
- Genres: Folk, alternative rock
- Occupation(s): Singer, composer
- Instrument(s): Guitar, voice
- Years active: 2009–present
- Labels: Independent

Mocchi (born 8 June 1990) is a Uruguayan singer and composer.

== Biography ==
Lu Mocchi was born in Montevideo, where they began their musical training at age eight. They attended piano lessons at the Virgilio Scarabelli Alberti School and continued at the W. Kolischer Conservatory. At age thirteen they began playing guitar and bass, and joined various bands in which they participated as a guitarist, bassist, and vocalist.

In 2009, they won the "Canto Joven – Movida Joven 2009" award and a mention for best composition, granted by the Municipality of Montevideo. The following year they received the same prize and a unique mention for composition.

Thanks to the Chilean musician Edgardo "Yayo" Serka, drummer for the Mexican singer Lila Downs, they made several appearances and a tour in the United States, with musicians based in that country, among them Serka and the Mexican bassist Luis Guzmán, also from Downs' band.

In 2011, urged by singer and producer Lea Ben Sasson, they began recording La Velocidad del paisaje, their first studio material, preproduced by Martín Musotto, brother of the Argentine percussionist Ramiro Musotto. The album also had the special participation of "Yayo" Serka and Luis Guzmán. It was recorded live in different studios in Montevideo and Buenos Aires, and includes eleven songs written by Mocchi.

In April 2014, they were the opening act for Paul McCartney at the Estadio Centenario in Montevideo, which was a turning point in the visibility of their career.

Mocchi was the executive producer of the documentary Botija de mi país (2013), which deals with the careers of ten Uruguayan musicians established in the United States, including José Serebrier, who was nominated 38 times for Grammy Awards, and won eight.

In November 2016, they presented their second album entitled Mañana será otro disco, with the participation of Fernando Cabrera, Julián Kartun, Andrés Beeuwsaert, and violinist Christine Brebes. It was produced by Esteban Pesce.

Mocchi is a transgender person.

== Discography ==
- La velocidad del paisaje (2013)
- Mañana será otro disco (2016)
- Autores en Vivo (2020)
- 1990 (2022)
- La Certeza del Dolor (2023)
- El Frío Que Nos Convoca (2024)
