= Rina Massardi =

Italian opera singer

- Born: Romarina Massardi; 21 June 1897; Virle Treponti, Brescia, Italy
- Died: 23 July 1979 (aged 82); Montevideo, Uruguay
- Occupations: Filmmaker, actress, opera singer
- Notable work: ¿Vocación?

Romarina Massardi (21 June 1897 – 23 July 1979) was an Italian-Uruguayan canto lírico singer, actress, and film director, responsible for the first South American lyric film, released in 1938.

== Biography ==
Romarina Massardi was born in Virle Treponti, a town near Brescia, the daughter of an Italian marble worker who moved the family to Montevideo to work on the construction of the Legislative Palace. She studied lyrical singing there, began to sing professionally, and performed in different venues of the country. In 1923 she received a scholarship to study in Milan, and then at the Accademia Nazionale di Santa Cecilia in Rome.

In 1930 she began her career as a soprano, performing at the Solís Theatre in Montevideo and the Teatro Colón in Buenos Aires. In 1934 she traveled to the United States, recorded her trip with a 16 mm camera, and conceived the project of writing a script and making a film. Upon returning to Montevideo she began the realization of this plan. The result would be released four years later.

It was her only movie, although she continued to film trips and family events until 1951. She continued her performing career until 1956 and then devoted herself to singing lessons. She died in 1979 at age 82.

== ¿Vocación? ==
The film, titled ¿Vocación?, was 1 hour and 3 minutes long. Created, directed, interpreted, and produced by Rina, it premiered in Montevideo in August 1938 without great public success. It was exhibited in Uruguay, Argentina, Chile, and Venezuela. In 1939 it was selected for the 7th Venice Film Festival.

The protagonist Eva Lauri, played by Massardi, travels to the capital with aspirations to become a lyric singer, and thanks to her faith she succeeds. The story has a self-referential character.

== Recognition ==
In 2013, the Uruguayan visual artist Inés Olmedo published her research on the life and work of the artist, and held exhibitions under the title Rina, la primera, contributing to the legitimization of Rina Massardi as the first Uruguayan woman filmmaker and the glorification and knowledge of her work.
