= Juan Giuria =

Uruguayan architect and architectural historian

Juan Giuria (1880-1957) was a Uruguayan architect and architectural historian.

== Biography ==
He was a student of the old Faculty of Mathematics of Montevideo, where he obtained his degree in Architecture. He devoted himself to lecturing and investigation. He was one of the founders of the Institute of Architectural History; among his collaborators were Aurelio Lucchini and Elzeario Boix.

== Projects ==
- Pavilion of Hospital Pereira Rossell (1915)
- Hospital Pedro Visca (now: Facultad de Ciencias Económicas y Administración, 1923)

== Selected works ==
- La obra arquitectónica hecha por los maestros jesuitas Andrés Blanqui y Juan Prímoli, Revista de la Sociedad de Amigos de la Arqueología, Tomo X, Montevideo, 1947.
- La arquitectura en el Paraguay, Instituto de Arte Americano e Investigaciones Estéticas, Buenos Aires, 1950.
- Modalidades de la arquitectura colonial peruana, El Siglo Ilustrado, Montevideo, 1952.
- La arquitectura en el Uruguay, Imprenta Universal, Montevideo, 1955-1958 (4 vol.).
