= Daniel Vidart =

Uruguayan anthropologist and historian (1920–2019)

Daniel Vidart (October 7, 1920 in Paysandú – May 14, 2019) was a Uruguayan anthropologist, writer, historian, and essayist.

He was one of the most notable social scientists of the region. In 2010 he was awarded the Grand National Prize for Intellectual Activity.

He died in 2019, aged 98.

== Works ==
- Tomás Berreta. La Industrial, Montevideo, 1946
- Esquema de una Sociología Rural Uruguaya. Ministerio de Ganadería y Agricultura, Montevideo, 1948
- Sociología Rural. Salvat, Barcelona, 2 vol. 1960
- Teoría del tango. Banda Oriental, Montevideo, 1964
- Los pueblos prehistóricos del territorio uruguayo. Centro Paul Rivet, Montevideo, 1965
- Caballos y jinetes. Pequeña historia de los pueblos ecuestres. Arca, Montevideo, 1967;
- El paisaje uruguayo. El medio biofísico y la respuesta cultural de su habitante. Alfa, Montevideo, 1967
- El tango y su mundo. Tauro, Montevideo, 1967
- Ideología y realidad de América. Universidad de la República, Montevideo, 1968
- El legado de los inmigrantes (with Renzo Pi Hugarte), Nuestra Tierra, Montevideo, 1969-1970
- Los muertos y sus sombras. Cinco siglos de América. Banda Oriental, Montevideo, 1993
- El juego y la condición humana. Banda Oriental, Montevideo, 1995
- El mundo de los charrúas. Banda Oriental, Montevideo, 1996
- Los cerritos de los indios del Este uruguayo. Banda Oriental, Montevideo, 1996
- La trama de la identidad nacional, Banda Oriental, Montevideo:
  - Tº lº Indios, negros, gauchos, 1997
  - Tº 2º El diálogo ciudad – campo, 1998
  - Tº 3º El espíritu criollo, 2000
- Un vuelo chamánico. Editorial Fin de Siglo, Montevideo, 1999;
- El rico patrimonio de los orientales. Banda Oriental, Montevideo, 2003
- Cuerpo vestido, cuerpo desvestido. Antropología de la ropa interior femenina. (with Anabella Loy). Banda Oriental, Montevideo, 2000
- Los fugitivos de la historia. Banda Oriental, Montevideo, 2009
- Tiempo de Navidad. Una antropología de la fiesta. (with Anabella Loy). Banda Oriental, Montevideo, 2009.
- Uruguayos. 2012
- Tiempo de carnaval. 2013
