= Eduardo Gerolami =

Uruguayan footballer (born 1952)

Personal information
- Full name: Eduardo Omar Gerolami Vives
- Date of birth: 10 March 1952 (age 74)
- Place of birth: Salto, Uruguay
- Position: Defender

Senior career*
Years	Team	Apps	(Gls)
1970–1973	Nacional		
1973–1974	→ Montevideo Wanderers (loan)		
1975–1978	Recreativo	84	(5)
1978–1980	Sevilla	14	(1)
1980–1982	Campesinos	42	(0)
1982	Montevideo Wanderers		
- * Club domestic league appearances and goals

Eduardo Gerolami (born 10 March 1952) is a Uruguayan former football defender who played professionally in Uruguay, Spain and Mexico.

== Career ==
Born in Salto, Gerolami began playing football as a central defender with a local selection and turned professional with Montevideo side Club Nacional de Football in 1970. He played for the reserve team and was loaned to Montevideo Wanderers F.C. before returning to play for Nacional's first team in 1974.

In 1975, Gerolami moved to Spain to play for Segunda División side Recreativo de Huelva. In three seasons, he helped the club gain promotion to La Liga. Shortly after, he was signed by Andalusian side Sevilla FC for two seasons.

After falling out of favor with Sevilla, Gerolami moved to Mexico, joining Mexican Primera División side Atletas Campesinos for two seasons. He injured his Achilles tendon and returned to Uruguay where he attempted a second stint with Montevideo Wanderers but had to retire due to the injury.
