= Humberto =

Humberto is a Portuguese and Spanish masculine given name of Germanic origin. Notable people with this name include:

== A ==
- Humberto Aguilar Coronado
- Humberto Ak'ab'al
- Humberto Albornoz
- Humberto Alonso Morelli
- Humberto Alonso Razo
- Humberto Álvarez Machaín
- Humberto Andrade Quezada
- Humberto André Redes Filho
- Humberto Anguiano
- Humberto de Araújo Benevenuto
- Humberto Arencibia
- Humberto de Alencar Castelo Branco
- Humberto Aspitia

== B ==
- Humberto Ballesteros
- Humberto Barbosa
- Humberto Bedford
- Humberto Benítez Treviño
- Humberto Biazotti
- Humberto Blasco
- Humberto Brenes
- Humberto Briceño
- Humberto Briseño Sierra

== C ==
- Humberto Calzada
- Humberto de Campos
- Humberto Carrillo
- Humberto Castellanos
- Humberto Castro
- Humberto Causa
- Humberto Cervantes Vega
- Humberto Clayber
- Humberto Coelho
- Humberto Contreras
- Humberto Costa
- Humberto Costantini
- Humberto Cota
- Humberto Cruz
- Humberto Curi

== D ==
- Humberto De la Calle
- Humberto Delgado
- Humberto Domingo Mayans
- Humberto Donoso
- Humberto Dávila Esquivel
- Humberto Díaz Casanueva

== E ==
- Humberto Elgueta
- Humberto Elizondo

== F ==
- Humberto Fernandes
- Humberto Fernández Morán
- Humberto Fierro
- Humberto Filizola
- Humberto Fontova
- Humberto Fuentes
- Humberto Fuenzalida (1904–1966), Chilean geographer, geologist and paleontologist

== G ==
- Humberto García
- Humberto García Reyes
- Humberto Gatica
- Humberto Gessinger
- Humberto González
- Humberto Gordon
- Humberto Grondona
- Humberto Guerra Allison
- Humberto Gómez Landero

== H ==
- Humberto Hernandez-Haddad
- Humberto Hernandez Jr.
- Humberto Hernández
- Humberto Hernández (cyclist)
- Humberto Hernández (footballer)
- Humberto Honorio

== I ==
- Humberto I (Buenos Aires Underground)
- Humberto Ivaldi

== L ==
- Humberto Lay
- Humberto Leal Garcia
- Humberto Lepe Lepe
- Humberto Llanos
- Humberto López Lena
- Humberto Lugo Gil
- Humberto Luna

== M ==
- Humberto Macías Romero
- Humberto Mariles
- Humberto Martins Barbosa
- Humberto Martínez
- Humberto Maschio
- Humberto Maturana
- Humberto Mauro
- Humberto Mauro Gutiérrez
- Humberto Mauro da Silva Teixeira
- Humberto Medina
- Humberto Medina (dancer)
- Humberto Medina (footballer)
- Humberto Megget
- Humberto Mendoza
- Humberto Millán Salazar
- Humberto Monserrate Anselmi
- Humberto Moreira
- Humberto Moré

== N ==
- Humberto Nilo
- Humberto Núñez

== O ==
- Humberto Ortega
- Humberto Osorio

== P ==
- Humberto Padrón
- Humberto Parra
- Humberto Pascoal
- Humberto Posada
- Humberto Prieto Herrera

== Q ==
- Humberto Quintero

== R ==
- Humberto Ramos
- Humberto Rivas Mijares
- Humberto Robinson
- Humberto Rodríguez "El Gato"
- Humberto Roque Villanueva
- Humberto Rosa
- Humberto Rosa (footballer)
- Humberto Rosa (painter)
- Humberto Ríos Labrada

== S ==
- Humberto Saavedra
- Humberto Selvetti
- Humberto Sierra
- Humberto Solano
- Humberto Solás
- Humberto Soriano
- Humberto Sorí Marin
- Humberto Soto
- Humberto Soto (heavyweight boxer)
- Humberto Sousa Medeiros
- Humberto Suazo
- Humberto Sánchez
- Humberto Suzigan

== T ==
- Humberto Tapia
- Humberto Teixeira
- Humberto Toledo
- Humberto Tomasina
- Humberto Tony García
- Humberto Tozzi

== V ==
- Humberto Viola
- Humberto Vélez

== Z ==
- Humberto Zurita

== See also ==
- Humberto Vidal explosion
- List of storms named Humberto
- Humbert, a Germanic given name
