= Filipino immigration to Mexico =

Overview of immigration along the Galleon Route

Filipino Mexicans
Pilipino sa Mexico (Filipino); Filipinos in Mexico (English); Filipinos en México (Spanish)
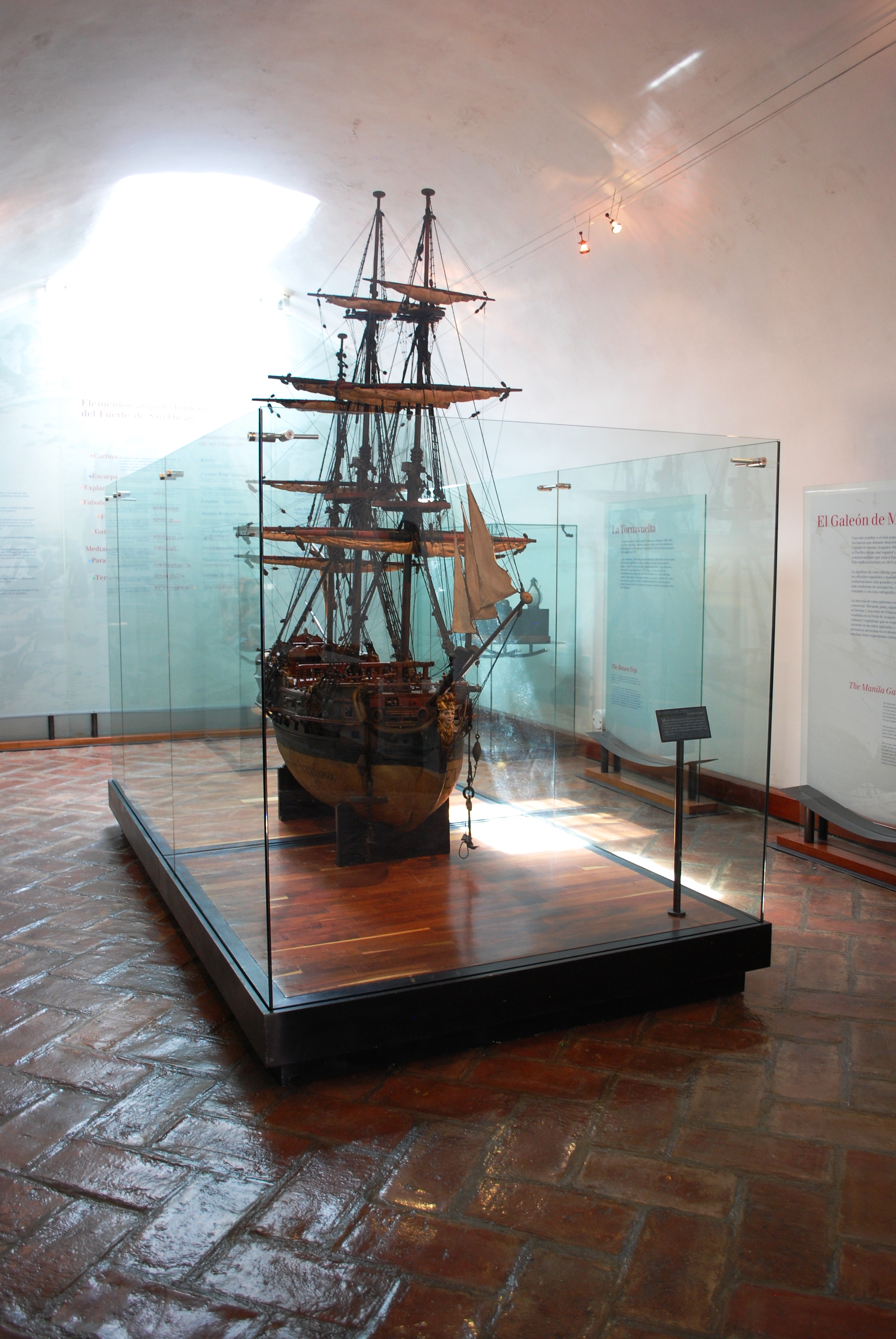
- Model of the ship San Pedro de Cerdeña on display at the San Diego Fort in Acapulco

Total population
- 1,200 Filipino nationals residing in Mexico

Regions with significant populations
- New Immigrants: Guadalajara, Monterrey, Tapachula, Coatzacoalcos, Juchitán and Mexico City. Descendants: Isthmus of Tehuantepec, Coastal regions of Jalisco, Colima, Michoacán, Guerrero, Oaxaca, and Chiapas

Languages
- Mexican Spanish, Tagalog, English and other Philippine languages

Religion
- Roman Catholicism minority of Islam and Irreligion.

Related ethnic groups
- Overseas Filipino, Asian Mexicans

Filipino Mexicans (Spanish: Mexicanos Filipinos) are Mexican citizens who are descendants of Filipino ancestry. There are approximately 1,200 Filipino nationals residing in Mexico. In addition, genetic studies indicate that about a third of people sampled from Guerrero have Asian ancestry with genetic markers matching those of the populations of the Philippines.

== History ==
Filipino immigration into Mexico expanded alongside the Manila-Acapulco Galleon trade, that formally began in 1565, with the successful return trip of the galleon ship, the San Pedro, headed by Friar Andrés de Urdaneta who had originally sailed out the island of Cebu in the Philippines. The trade route served as an economic connection between Spain, New Spain, and the Spanish East Indies. Throughout its two hundred and fifty years active, it transported goods, sailors, travelers, Asian migrants, and slaves between Manila and colonial Mexico.

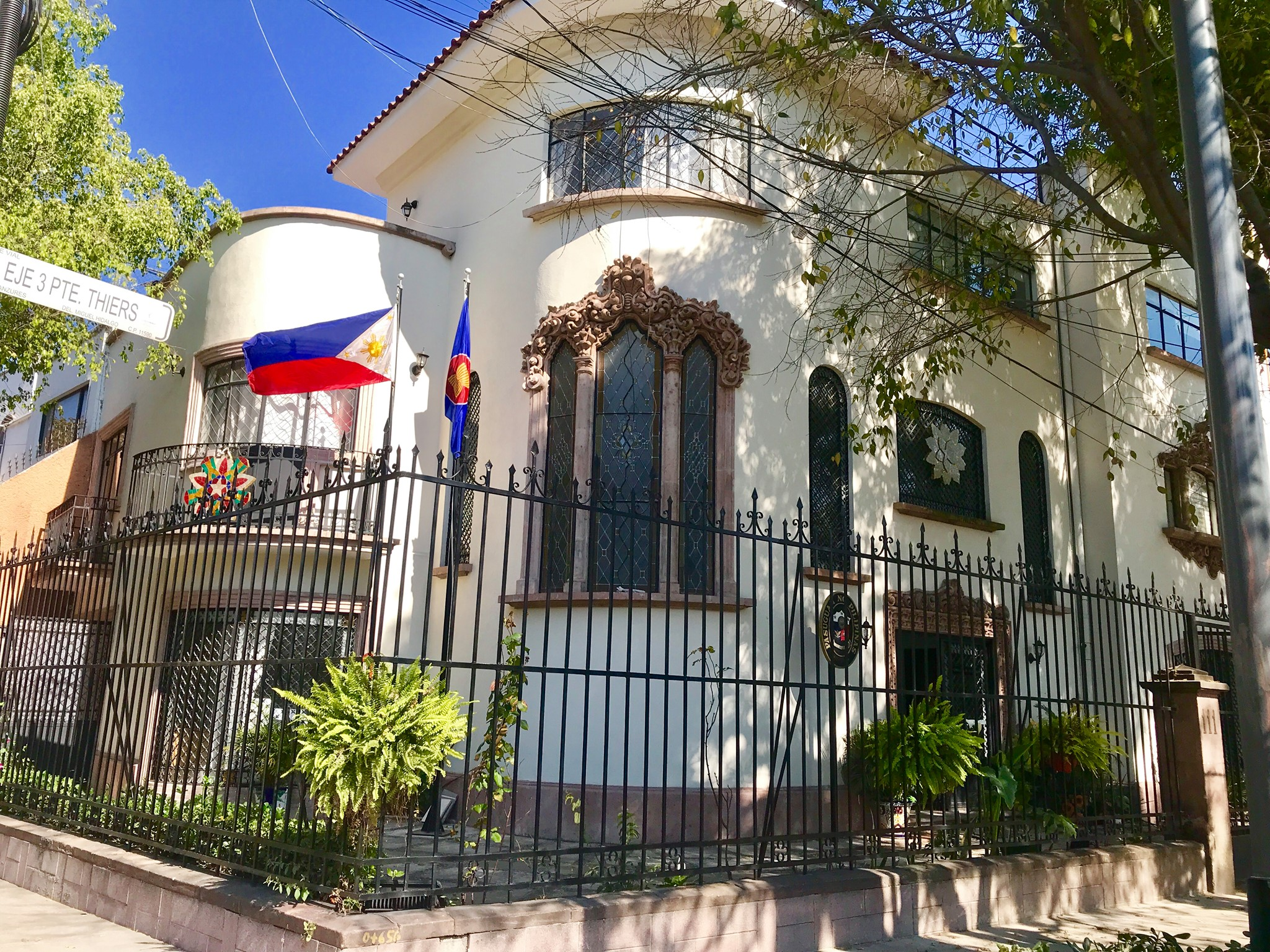
Embassy of The Philippines in Colonia Veronica Anzures, Mexico City

In 1574 Spain decreed that Spanish colonists could not enslave natives, but Indigenous chiefs were allowed to retain their rights to slaves. This was through the indigenous alipin system. This created a legal process that allowed enslaved natives to challenge for their freedom, but also created a court system where slaveholders could claim ownership through the court. The Manila-Acapulco galleon trade allowed officials to acquire slaves during their stay in the Philippines, licensing their travel to Mexico and then again to Spain but as historian Tatiana Seijas observes, the record keeping in the Philippines during this time allowed for traders to circumvent this, leaving no paper trail. Hernando de los Ríos Coronel expressed concerns to an increasing number of male slaves being boarded on the Galleons through reports on overcrowding and poor ship conditions. Incidents with the transportation of enslaved women on the galleons led the King of Spain to ban their boarding completely, however, as Seijas notes, it was largely ignored and a quarter of early enslaved crossings were women.

Filipinos were also pressed into service as sailors, due to the native maritime culture of the Philippine Islands. By 1619, the crew of the Manila galleons were composed almost entirely of native sailors, many of whom died during the voyages due to harsh treatment and dangerous conditions. Many of the galleons were also old, overloaded, and poorly repaired. A law passed in 1608 restricted the gear of Filipino sailors to "ropa necesaria" which consisted of a single pair of breeches, further causing a great number of deaths of Filipino sailors through exposure. These conditions prompted King Philip III to sign a law in 1620 forcing merchants to issue proper clothing to native crews. During this period, many Filipino sailors deserted as soon as they reached Acapulco. Sebastian de Piñeda, the captain of the galleon Espiritu Santo complained to the king in 1619 that of the 75 Filipino crewmen aboard the ship, only 5 remained for the return voyage. The rest had deserted. These sailors settled in Mexico and married locals (even though some may have been previously married in the Philippines), particularly since they were also in high demand by wine-merchants in Colima for their skills in the production of tubâ (palm wine).

Christianized Filipinos comprised the majority of free Asian immigrants (chino libre) and could own property and have rights that even Native Americans did not have, including the right to carry a sword and dagger for personal protection. They often owned coconut plantations in Colima, an example from 1619 was Andrés Rosales who owned twenty-eight coconut palms. Others were merchants, like Tomás Pangasinan, a native of Pampanga, who was recorded to have paid thirteen pesos in taxes for the purchase of Chinese silks from the Manila galleons in the 17th century. The cities of Mexico, Puebla, and Guadalajara had enough Filipino neighborhoods that they formed segregated markets of Asian goods called Parián (named after similar markets in the Philippines).

The descendants of these early migrants mostly settled in the regions near the terminal ports of the Manila galleons. These include Acapulco, Barra de Navidad, and San Blas, Nayarit, as well as numerous smaller intermediate settlements along the way. They also settled the regions of Colima and Jalisco before the 17th century, which were seriously depopulated of Native American settlements during that period due to the Cocoliztli epidemics and Spanish forced labor. They also settled in significant numbers in the barrio San Juan of Mexico City, although in modern times, the area has become more associated with later Chinese migrants. A notably large settlement of Filipinos during the colonial era is Coyuca de Benítez along the Costa Grande of Guerrero, which at one point in history was called "Filipino town".

== Influence ==
The Filipinos introduced many cultural practices to Mexico, such as the method of making palm wine, called "tubâ", the mantón de Manila, the chamoy, and possibly the guayabera (called filipina in Veracruz and the Yucatán Peninsula). Distillation technology used by bootleggers for the production of mezcal was also introduced by Filipino migrants in the late 16th century, via the adaptation of the stills used in the production of Philippine palm liquor (lambanog) which were introduced to Colima with tubâ.

Filipino words also entered Mexican vernacular, such as the word for palapa (originally meaning "coconut palm leaf petiole" in Tagalog), which became applied to a type of thatching using coconut leaves that resembles the Filipino nipa hut.

Various crops were also introduced from the Philippines, including coconuts, the Ataulfo and Manilita mangoes, abacá, and bananas.

A genetic study in 2018 found that around a third of the population of Guerrero have 10% Filipino ancestry.

== Historical records ==
Colonial-era Filipino immigrants to Mexico are difficult to trace in historical records because of several factors. The most significant factor being the use of the terms indio and chino. In the Philippines, natives were known as indios, but they lost that classification when they reached the Americas, since the term in New Spain referred to Native Americans. Instead they were called chinos, leading to the modern confusion of early Filipino immigrants with the much later Chinese immigrants in the late 1800s and early 1900s. Intermarriage and assimilation into Native American communities also buried the true extent of Filipino immigration, as they became indistinguishable from the bulk of the peasantry.

Another factor is the pre-colonial Filipino (and Southeast Asian) tradition of not having last names. Filipinos and Filipino migrants acquired Spanish surnames, either after conversion to Christianity or enforced by the Catálogo alfabético de apellidos during the mid-19th century. This makes it very difficult to trace Filipino immigrants in colonial records.

== Notable Mexicans of Filipino descent ==
- Ramón Fabié - Lieutenant Colonel commander of Miguel Hidalgo y Costilla
- Luis Pinzón - Military commander of José María Morelos
- Isidoro Montes de Oca – Mexican General and Lieutenant commander of Vicente Guerrero
- Romeo Tabuena – painter and printmaker
- Alejandro Gómez Maganda – Governor of Guerrero (1951–1954)
- Lili Rosales – Representative of Mexico in the Reina Hispanoamericana 2011 beauty contest
- Miguel A. Reina - Mexican filmmaker, screenwriter and film producer.

== See also ==
- Mexico–Philippines relations
- Manila galleon
- Mexican settlement in the Philippines
- Mestizos in Mexico
- Filipino mestizo
