= Mexico–Philippines relations =

- Mexico: Philippines

Mexico–Philippines relations (Spanish: Relaciones México y Filipinas; Filipino: Ugnayang Mehiko at Pilipinas) are the bilateral relations of Mexico and the Philippines. Mexico and the Philippines share a common history dating from when the Viceroyalty of New Spain ruled the Spanish East Indies for the Spanish Crown. Formal relations between the modern countries were established in 1953. Both nations are members of the Asia-Pacific Economic Cooperation, Forum of East Asia–Latin America Cooperation and the United Nations.

== History ==
Mexico and the Philippines share many traditions and customs, which derive from ties established over 250 years. In 1521 Hernán Cortés conquered the Aztec Empire; and in the same year, Ferdinand Magellan travelled to Asia and claimed the Philippine islands for the Spanish crown. In 1543, after their discovery, the explorer Ruy López de Villalobos sailed from Barra de Navidad, Jalisco, Mexico, to recognize and name these islands. They were named the Philippine Islands, in honor of Prince Felipe of Asturias.

In 1565, Spanish Governor General Miguel Lopez de Legazpi claimed the Philippines as a Spanish Colony and designated Manila as its capital in 1571. Due to its distance from Spain, the Spanish Government assigned Manila's administration and government to the Viceroyalty of New Spain for two and a half centuries. Evangelization and commercialization constituted the core of intercontinental ties between Asia and America that materialized with the Manila-Acapulco galleon trade.

Due to the exchange with the Philippines, many Mexicans and Spaniards remained in the Philippines, and some Filipinos in Mexico, particularly the central west coast, near the port town of Acapulco. Many Nahuatl words were adopted and popularized in the Philippines, such as Tianggui (market fair) and Zapote (a fruit).

=== Philippines under the Viceroyalty of New Spain ===
The Philippines was proclaimed a Spanish colony in 1565, when Miguel Lopez de Legazpi was appointed Governor General. He selected Manila as the capital in 1571. The islands were very remote, so the Spanish Royal Family commissioned the Philippine government administration to the Viceroyalty of New Spain based in Mexico City for over two and half centuries.

Hence many of the Filipino governors were Mexican-Creole. The army was recruited from all the populations of New Spain, which led to ethnic and cultural mingling between Mexicans and Filipinos. Evangelization and commerce connected America and Asia, exemplified by the galleon trade. The trade between Canton and Acapulco passed through Manila, where Chinese ships came laden with silks and porcelain to be sent to America, in exchange for silver. And the exchange of ideas accompanied the exchange of products.

=== Independent relationships ===
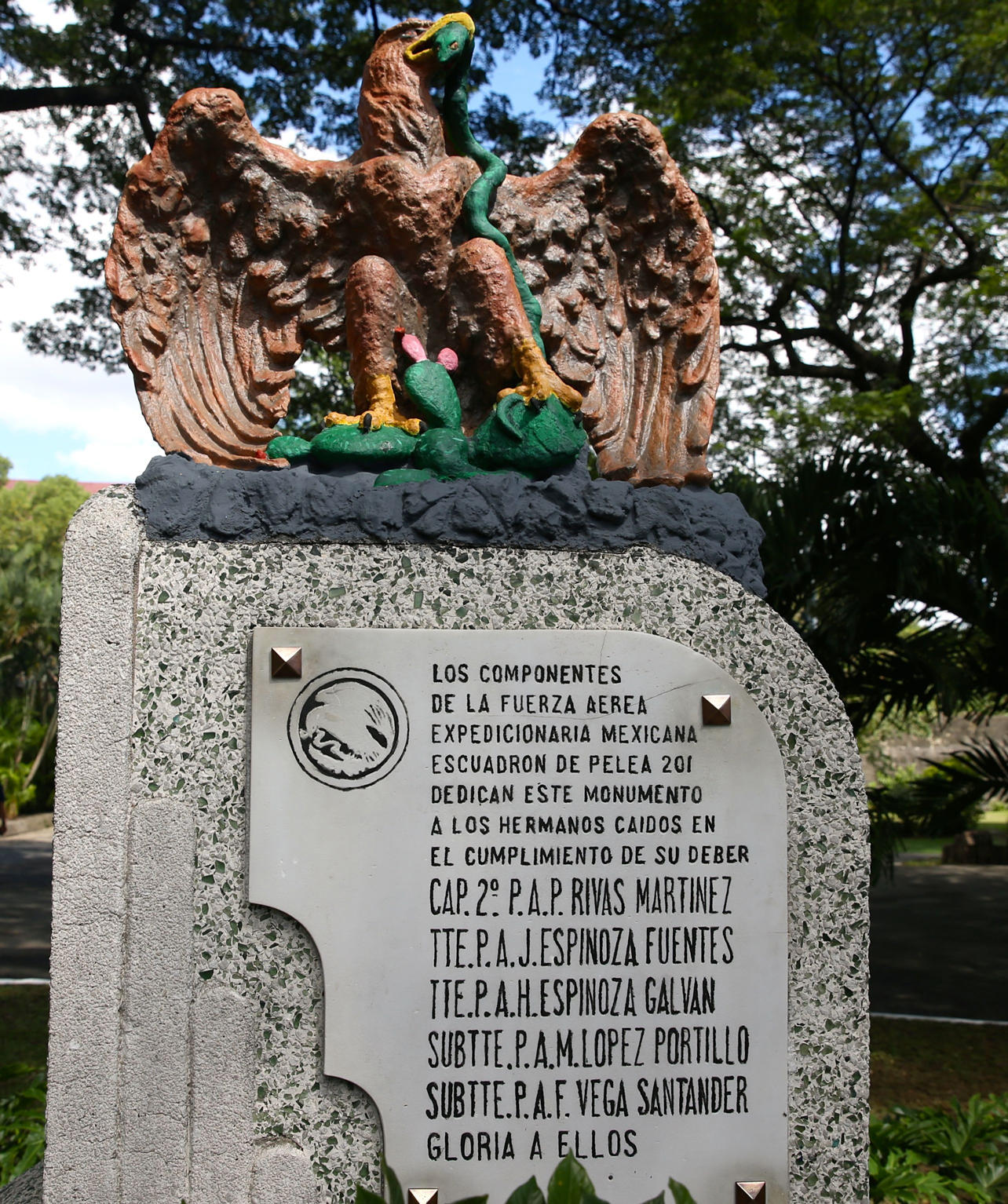
Monument to the 201st Fighter Squadron in Manila.

Mexicans were among the Latin Americans involved with the Filipino soldier Andrés Novales, he being of Mexican descent as well, and his 1823 uprising against Spain. In the Mexican side, Filipinos like Ramón Fabié had supported Miguel Hidalgo in the Mexican War of Independence. In 1842, after the colonial period, Mexico stationed an independent representative in Manila. However, the earliest reference to a Mexican diplomat in the Philippines is found during the Revolution, during the Porfiriato, with the appointment in 1878 of Evaristo Hernandez Butler, as Consul.

During World War II, Mexico participated in the Pacific campaign against Japan and sent the 201st Fighter Squadron, with a contingent of the Mexican Expeditionary Air Force, which arrived in Manila on 30 April 1945, commanded by Colonel Antonio Cárdenas Rodríguez. The Mexican air force participated in the Battle of Luzon.

=== After Philippine independence ===
The independence of the Philippines brought forth a new era of relations between these countries. Mexico dispatched an envoy to participate in the festivities to celebrate the birth of the Southeast Asian nation. Diplomatic ties between both countries were formalized on 14 April 1953. The year of 1964 was decreed the "Year of Philippine-Mexican Friendship" to celebrate the Fourth Centennial of the expedition of Miguel López de Legazpi. In modern day, the conquest of the Philippines is seen as a Spanish initiative, while Mexico is viewed as a country of historical link and friendship, and several groups intend on strengthening the bond between the two countries.

The Philippine Legation in Mexico opened its doors, with Carlos Gutiérrez Macias as Minister Extraordinary and Plenipotentiary, on 17 September 1953. It was elevated to the rank of an embassy on 25 July 1961. That same year, Mexico opened an embassy in Manila.

In 2023, both nations celebrated 70 years of diplomatic relations.

=== High-level visits ===
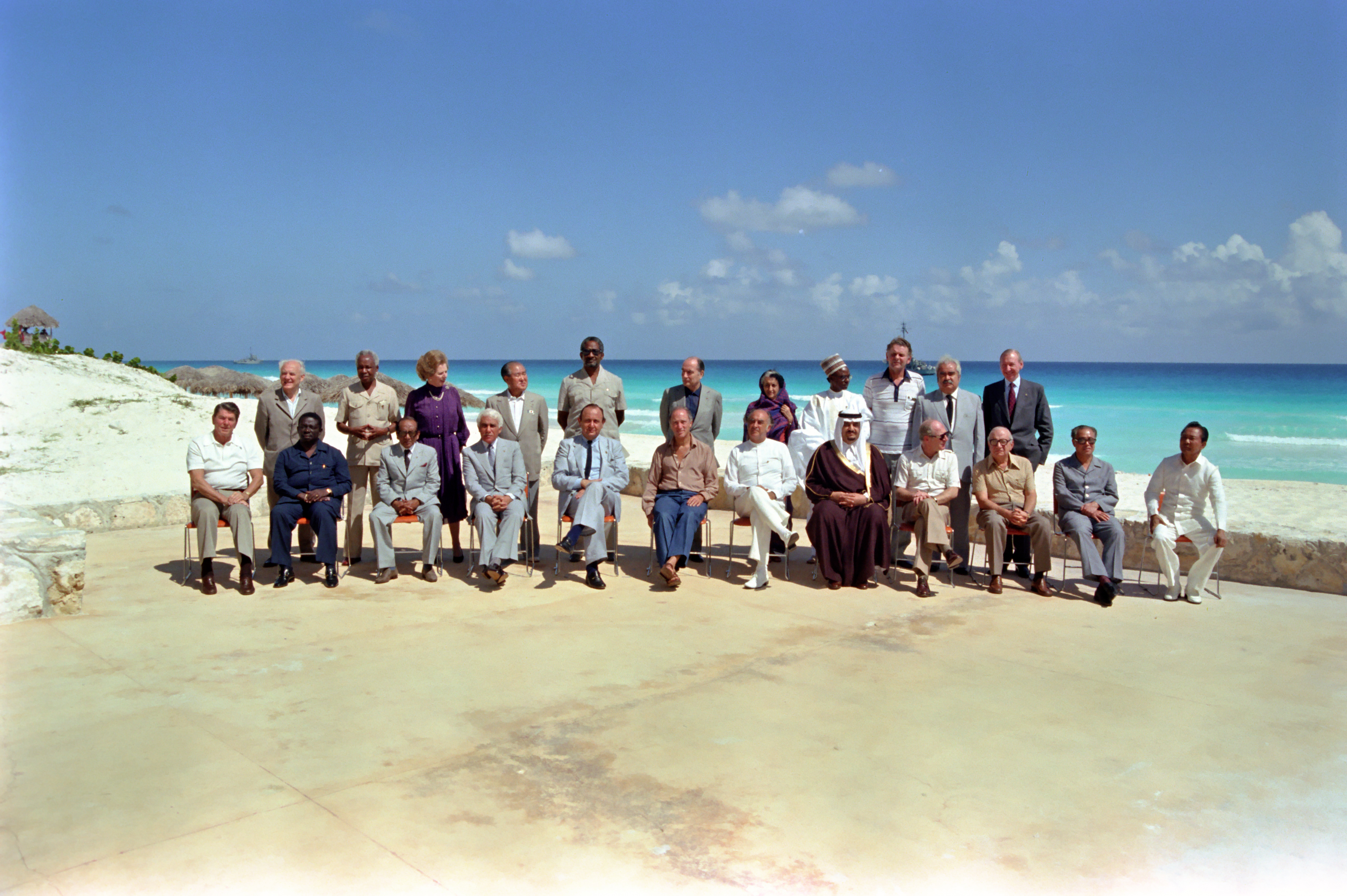
Philippine President Ferdinand Marcos attending the North–South Summit in Cancún along with his Mexican counterpart President José López Portillo, 1981.

During the presidency of Diosdado Macapagal, the President of Mexico, Adolfo López Mateos, paid a state visit to the Philippines from October 20 to 23, 1962, to respond to the trip to Mexico in 1960, by then Vice President Macapagal.

President Gloria Macapagal Arroyo visited Mexico on 21 November 2001 to attend the international conference of the Christian Democratic parties, at which President Vicente Fox represented Mexico. President Arroyo was the guest of Mexico during the Tenth APEC Leaders Meeting held in La Paz, Baja California in October 2002.

In November 2015, Mexican President Enrique Peña Nieto made a visit to the Philippines to attend the APEC Summit in Manila. During his visit, President Peña Nieto and Philippine President Benigno Aquino III discussed enhancing trade relations and witnessed the signing of bilateral agreements on the avoidance of double taxation, tourism cooperation, and combating illegal drug trade.

== List of high-level visits ==
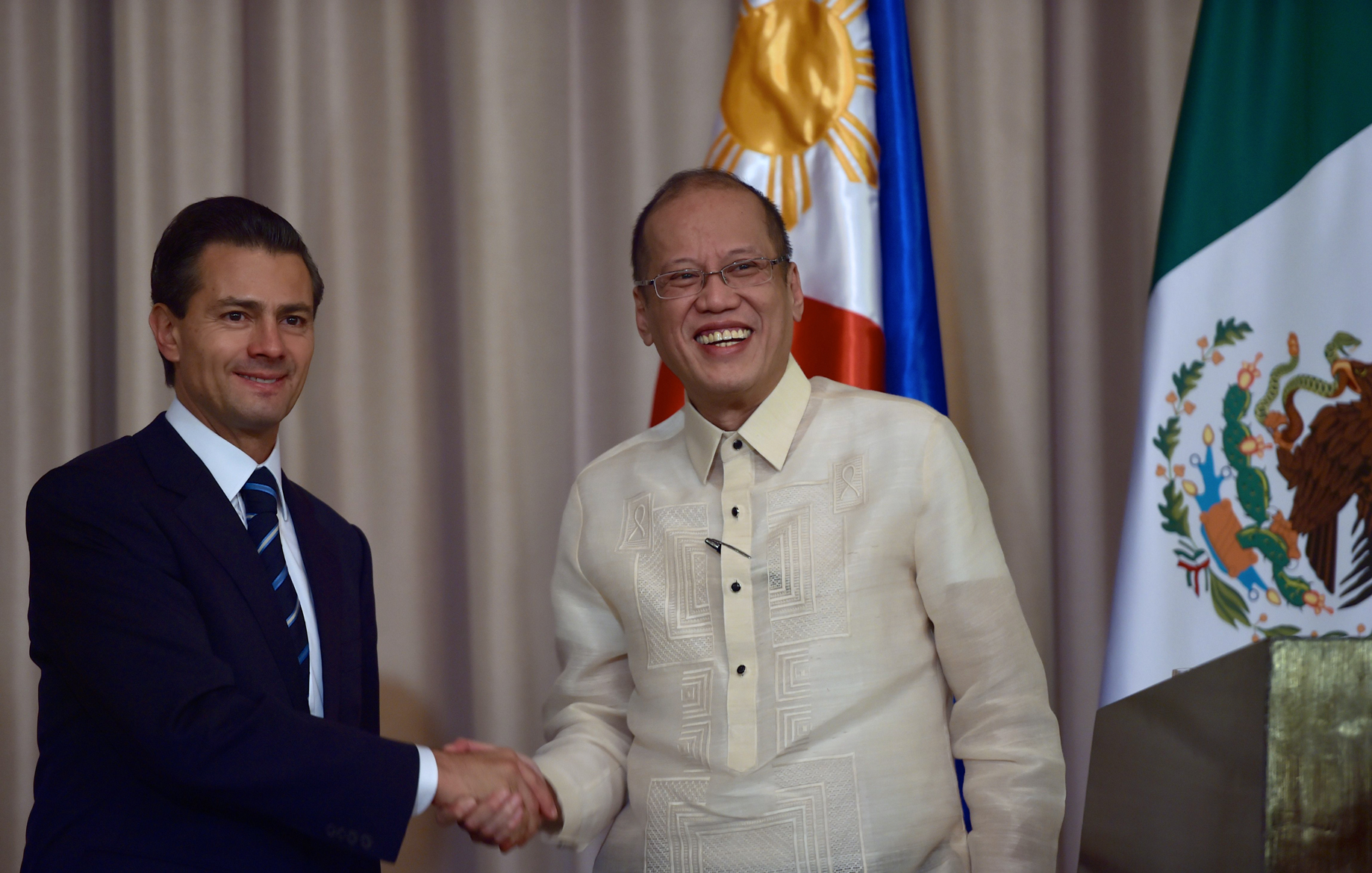
Mexican President Enrique Peña Nieto and Philippine President Benigno Aquino III in Manila; November 2015.

Presidential visits from Mexico to the Philippines

- President Adolfo López Mateos (October 1962)
- President José López Portillo (November 1978)
- President Ernesto Zedillo (November 1996)
- President Enrique Peña Nieto (November 2015)

Presidential visits from the Philippines to Mexico

- President Ferdinand Marcos (October 1981)
- President Fidel V. Ramos (May 1997)
- President Gloria Macapagal Arroyo (November 2001 & October 2002)

== Bilateral agreements signed ==
To date, Mexico and the Philippines have signed the following agreements:

- Agreement on Air Transportation (1952)
- Agreement on Cultural Exchanges (1969)
- Agreement on Cooperation in the Field of Tourism (1995)
- Agreement on Technical and Scientific Cooperation (1997)
- Agreement to Suppress Non-Ordinary Visas Requirements (1997)
- Agreement on Cooperation in Combating Illicit Trafficking and Abuse of Narcotic Drugs, Psychotropic Substances and Control of Chemical Precursors (1997)
- Memorandum of Understanding on Academic Cooperation between the Secretariat of Foreign Affairs of Mexico and the Department of Foreign Affairs of the Philippines (1997)
- Agreement on Mutual Administrative Assistance in Customs Matters (2012)
- Agreement to Avoid Double Taxation in Matters of Income Taxes and Prevent Tax Evasion (2015)

== Trade and commerce ==
In 2023, two-way trade between both nations amounted to US$3.5 billion. Mexico's main export products to the Philippines include: copper ores and concentrates, telephones and mobiles phones, electronics, cars and other motor vehicles, iron and steel, medicines, alcohol, plants, and cheese. The Philippines main export products to Mexico include: data processing machines, machinery parts, motors and generators, motor vehicle parts, optical fibers, rubber tires, fruits, nuts, vegetables, and fish. Mexico is the third largest importer from the Philippines in the Americas (after the United States and Canada) and is the seventh largest exporter to the Philippines. Mexican multinational company Cemex operates in the Philippines.

== UNESCO Partnership ==
In late 2014, the idea to nominate the Manila galleon (Manila–Acapulco Galleon) trade route was initiated by the Mexican ambassador to UNESCO and the Filipino ambassador to UNESCO after a meeting between the two sides during a documentary showing of Galleon was held in Cuernavaca, Mexico.

An Experts' Roundtable Meeting was held at the University of Santo Tomas on 23 April 2015 as part of the preparation of the Philippines for the possible transnational nomination of the Manila–Acapulco Galleon Trade Route to the World Heritage List. The nomination was made jointly with Mexico. The meeting focused on the tornaviaje, shipyards in the Bicol Region, underwater archaeology, maps and cartography, fortifications in the Philippines, food, textile, and historical dimension. The papers presented and discussed during the roundtable meeting was synthesized into a working document to establish the route's outstanding universal value. The Mexican side followed suit with the preparations for the route's nomination. Spain has also backed the nomination of the route in the World Heritage List and has also suggested the archives related to the route under the possession of the Philippines, Mexico, and Spain to be nominated as part of the Memory of the World Programme.

The Galeón: Manila–Acapulco Galleon Museum, or Museo de Galleon, had its soft opening in the capital of the Philippines in 2017. The museum is a prestigious exhibition and research center on the history of globalization, through the lens of the galleon trade, and thus from the Philippine and Mexican points of view. Various areas of the museum are still being constructed and expanded.

== Resident diplomatic missions ==
- Mexico has an embassy in Manila.
- Philippines has an embassy in Mexico City.
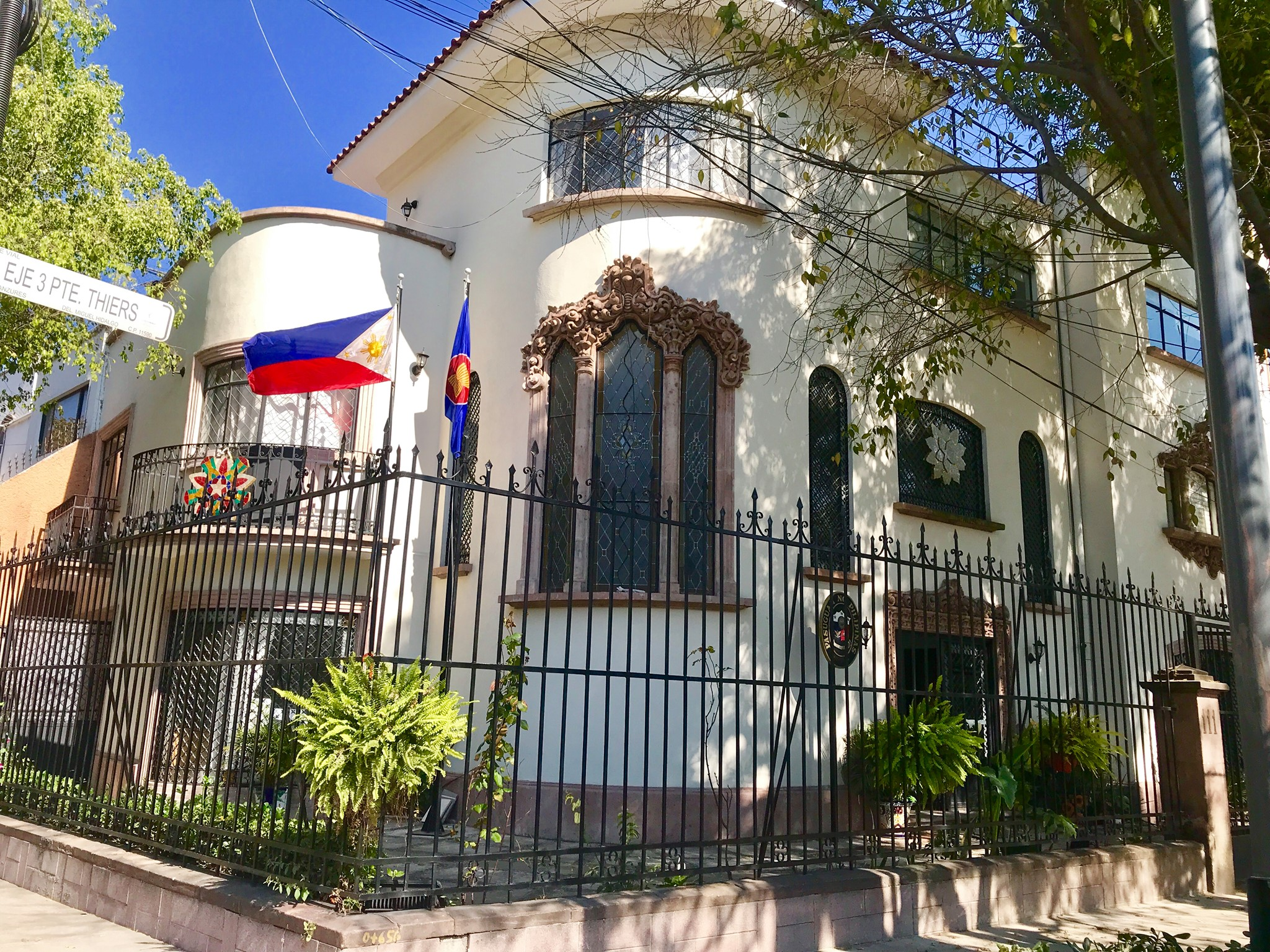
Embassy of the Philippines in Mexico City

== Gallery ==
Map from 1748 showing the trade route between Acapulco and Manila

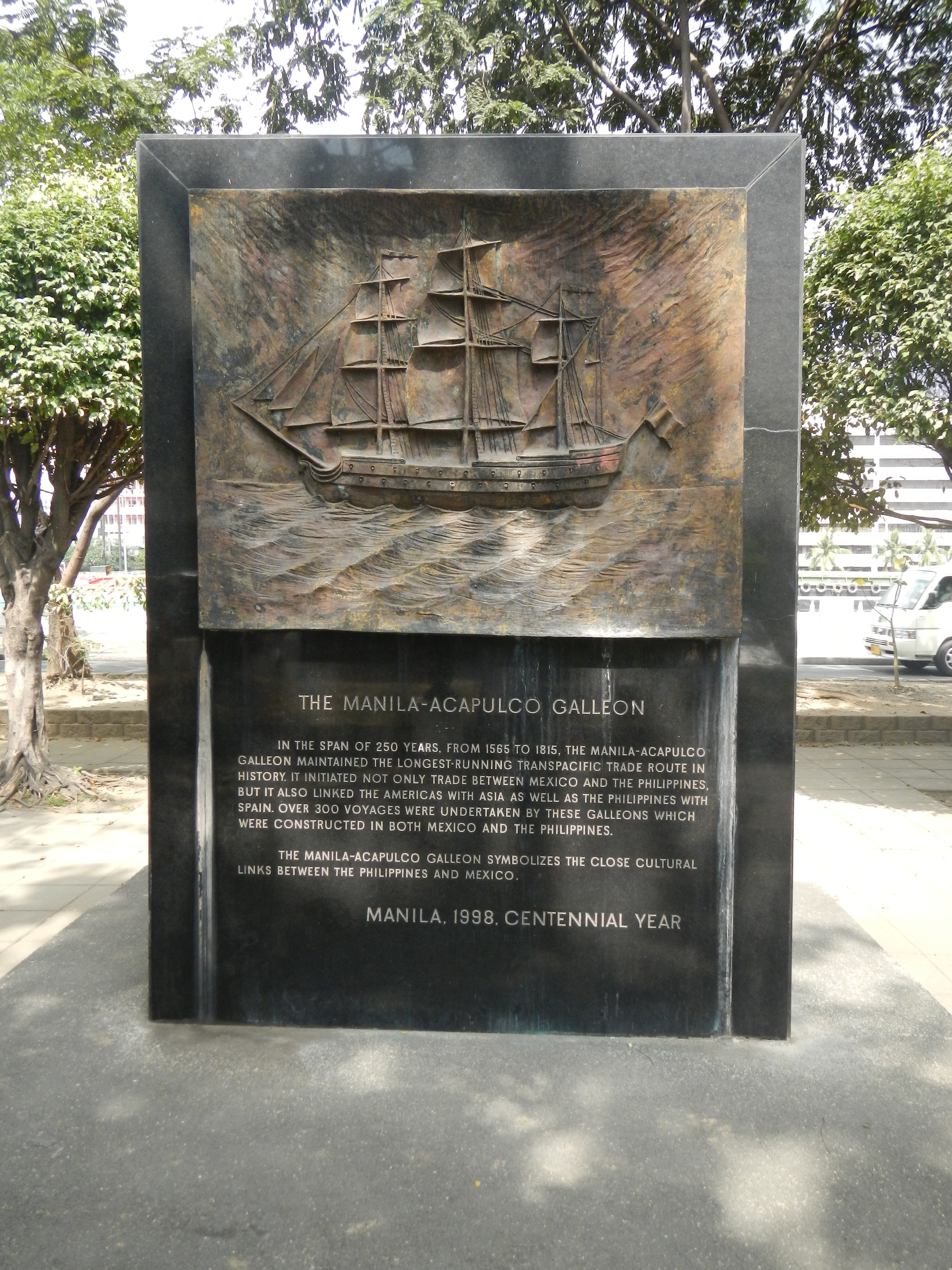
Plaque commemorating the Manila-Acapulco Galleon in Manila

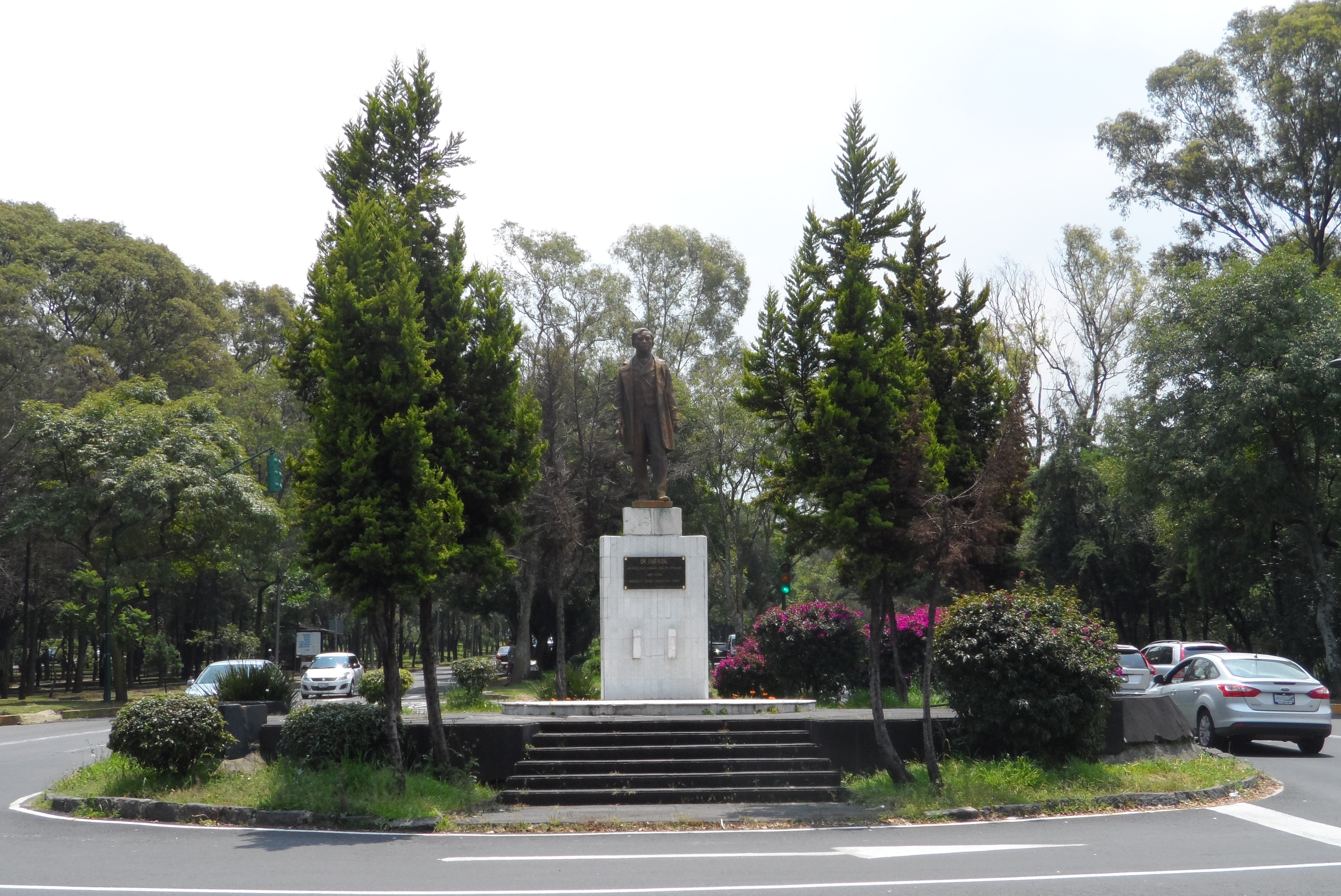
Monument to José Rizal on the Paseo de la Reforma in Mexico City

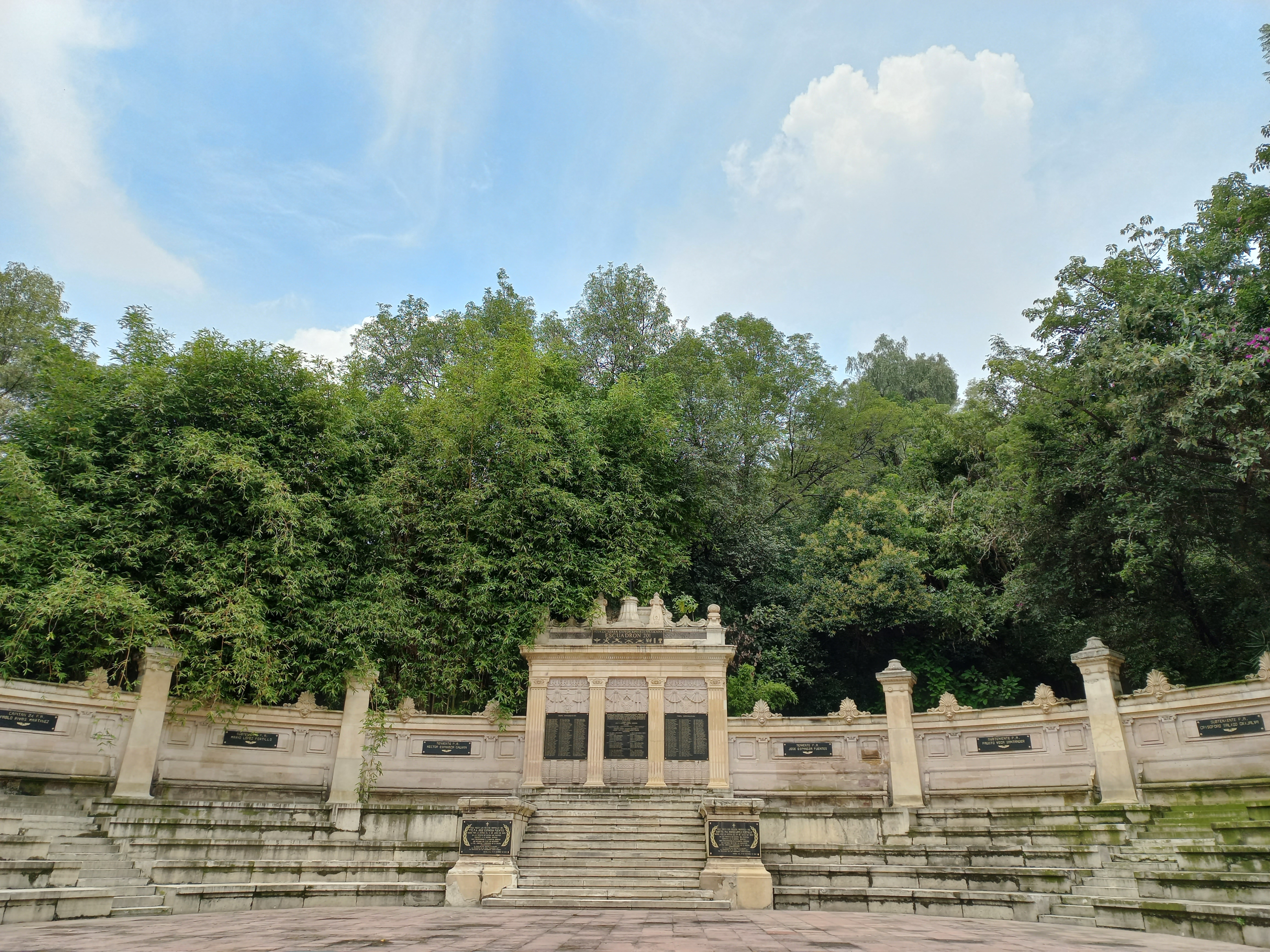
Monument dedicated to the 201st Fighter Squadron in Mexico City

== See also ==
- Embassy of the Philippines, Mexico City
- Filipino immigration to Mexico
- Mexican settlement in the Philippines
- Mexico, Pampanga
- Plaza Mexico (Manila)
