= Humberto Romero =

Humberto Romero may refer to:

- Carlos Humberto Romero (1924–2017), former President of El Salvador
- Humberto Macías Romero (born 1985), Mexican politician
- Humberto Romero (footballer) (born 1964), Mexican football defender
