= Colonia Anzures =

Neighborhood in Miguel Hidalgo, Mexico City

Anzures
- Colonia
- Colonia Anzures
- Houses on Calle Shakespeare
- Boundaries of Colonia Anzures
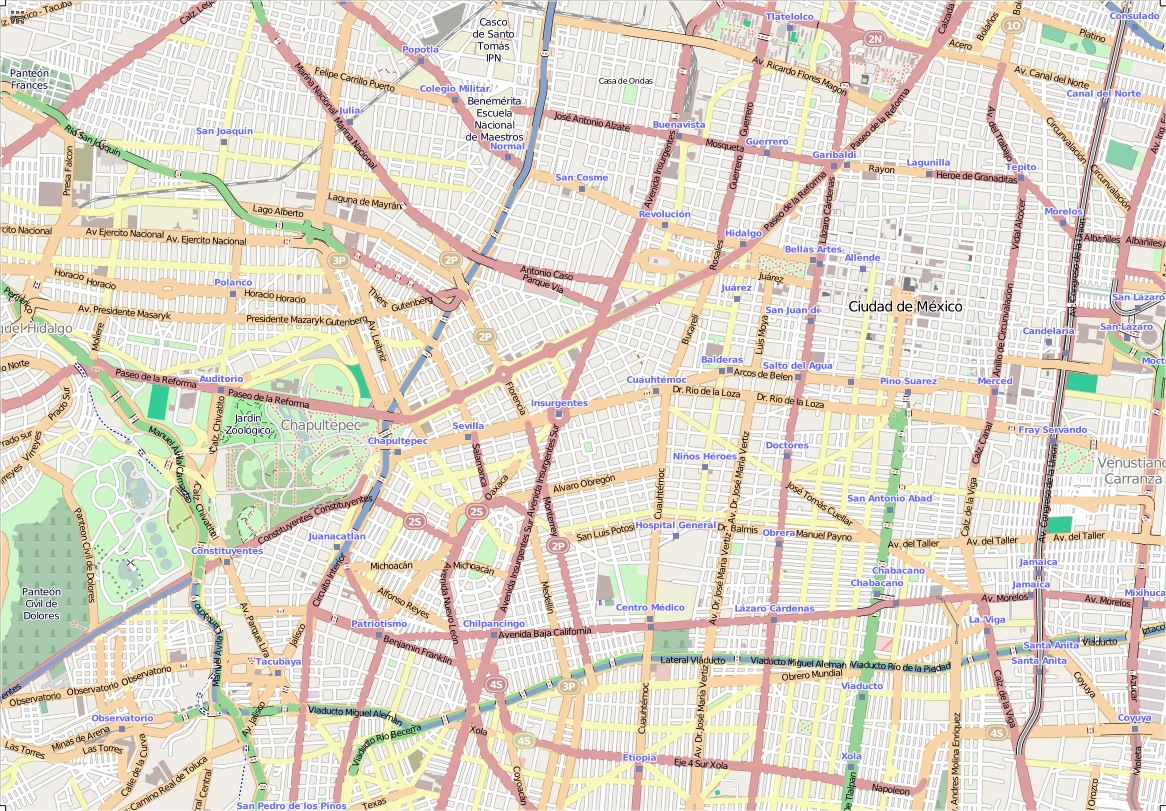
- Location within west-central Mexico City
- Coordinates: 19.4305°N 99.1780°W
- Country: Mexico
- City: Mexico City
- Borough: Miguel Hidalgo
- Lots first sold: 1925

Population (estimate)
  - Total: 3,510
- Postal code: 11590

Colonia Anzures, usually just Anzures, is a colonia (neighborhood) in the Miguel Hidalgo borough of Mexico City, between Polanco and Colonia Cuauhtémoc, just north of Chapultepec. It was laid out in the 1920s on the old Rancho de Anzures by the Anzures Land Co., a subsidiary of the British firm S. Pearson & Son, and is a decade older than neighboring Polanco. It is mainly residential, with several embassies and the Hotel Camino Real by Ricardo Legorreta.

== Location ==
The colonia is roughly a triangle. Its boundaries are:

- Avenida Ejército Nacional on the north, across which is Colonia Verónica Anzures
- Circuito Interior (Calzada Melchor Ocampo) on the east, across which is Colonia Cuauhtémoc in the Cuauhtémoc borough
- Calzada General Mariano Escobedo on the west, across which is Polanco

The southern end is by Paseo de la Reforma and the Chapultepec park.

Many streets are named for European writers, philosophers and scientists, e.g. Darwin, Descartes, Goethe, Milton, Tolstoi and Víctor Hugo.

== History ==
=== Rancho de Anzures ===
In the colonial era the land was part of the Rancho de Anzures, one of several ranches next to Chapultepec. According to local legend, Hernán Cortés gave it to La Malinche after the fall of Tenochtitlan, but there is no proof of this; another story says it belonged to Isabel Moctezuma. The ranch had a chapel dedicated to Saint Veronica, which later gave its name to Verónica Anzures. At one time it belonged to Salvador Malo.

In 1895 the Farmers' Loan & Trust Co. of New York lent 750,000 gold pesos to the Mexican National Exposition & Land Co., secured on the ranch. In 1901 the London firm Wernher, Beit & Co. (of Julius Wernher and Alfred Beit) and the federal government, represented by Finance Minister José Yves Limantour, agreed to buy the property together. The property went to public auction in 1904 and the government, the only bidder, bought it for 473,615.65 pesos. In 1905 the government kept about 150 hectares for the Bosque de Chapultepec, and Wernher, Beit got 64.2 ha between the Calzada de Tacuba or Popotla (now Mariano Escobedo) and "la Verónica" (now Melchor Ocampo).

=== The Anzures Land Company ===
In 1912 the Central Mining & Investment Co. of London set up the Anzures Land Co. to buy the land from Wernher, Beit, paying with 50,000 one-pound shares, about 500,000 pesos. The company only started work after the worst years of the Mexican Revolution.

In October 1920 S. Pearson & Son bought the land, through its subsidiary Whitehall Securities, which bought the 57,500 paid-up shares of the Anzures Land Co. at par. Buying shares rather than land avoided a land-sale tax and the limits on foreign landowners in Article 27 of the 1917 Constitution. The main reason given was a hospital "to benefit the British community in Mexico", but a memo also speaks of speculation.

In 1922 the company leased the 29,950 m^{2} where the Hotel Camino Real now stands along Calzada Nueva de Chapultepec a Tacubaya, now Calzada General Mariano Escobedo, no. 700, for 99 years to the Cowdray Hospital Association. The Cowdray Sanatorium, nicknamed the "Hospital Inglés" (English Hospital), opened there on 11 November 1923, and was the colonia's first large building. In 1941 it merged with the American Hospital to form the American British Cowdray Hospital, now the ABC Medical Center.

=== Sales, 1925–1941 ===
The land that is now Anzures was in two municipalities, the City of Mexico and Tacuba, and so it was split into two sections, with the Río de los Morales, roughly today's Darwin street, as the line between them. The urbanization contract with the city council was signed in October 1924, after two years of talks. The first four lots were sold between February 1925 and January 1926, at an average of 34 pesos (about US$16 at the time, $313 in 2026 dollars) per m^{2}—well above prices in Chapultepec Heights or Condesa. The original lots, 700 m^{2} on average, turned out to be too big for most buyers.

In March 1926 President Plutarco Elías Calles bought four lots, 2,537 m^{2} at the corner of Mariano Escobedo and Tolstoi, a third of everything sold up to then, and built a large California-style house there. Aarón Sáenz, then head of the Federal District, bought a lot in early 1933.

After three fairly good years, sales then stalled for seven, and so in March 1933 the company adopted a new sales plan. Prices were cut again, buyers got 15% off if they built within a year, and many lots were split up. In 1933–34 the Dirección de Pensiones Civiles (forerunner of the ISSSTE) bought lots for government employees, in four blocks between Darwin, Descartes and Melchor Ocampo. The real take-off came only in 1933; between 1934 and 1940, 83% of the first section was sold, at an average of 25.25 pesos per m^{2} in 1937.

In 1941 the whole northern (Tacuba) section was sold for cash, without streets or services, to Fraccionadora y Constructora Anzures, of the Raúl Baillères group, which developed it as Colonia Nueva Anzures. The Anzures Land Co. kept its Mexico office until the last payment came in, in 1947, and was wound up in 1948. Nueva Anzures was renamed Verónica Anzures in the late 1920s but the old name persists in use in some addresses in Anzures proper.

=== Later years ===
Many of the early houses are still standing, some now used as offices. Most are in the California colonial style, with some Art Deco. In 1943 the painter Ricardo Martínez de Hoyos set up his studio here, next door to Federico Cantú. In 1949, architect Max Cetto built a house and studio for Rufino Tamayo at Leibnitz 248.

The Hotel Camino Real, at Mariano Escobedo 700, opened on 25 July 1968, in time for the 1968 Summer Olympics. It was designed by Ricardo Legorreta, advised by Luis Barragán. Although it is in Anzures, it is marketed as "Camino Real Polanco".

== Demographics ==
Market Data México, using INEGI data, estimates that about 3,510 people live in Anzures, in about 1,310 households, with an average age of 29. There is no official population figure for individual colonias.

== Transport ==
Line 7 of the Metrobús runs along Paseo de la Reforma, which Anzures just touches at its southern tip. The nearest Metro stations are Chapultepec on Line 1, south of Reforma, and Polanco on Line 7. Anzures has had Ecobici bike-share stations since the system's second phase.

== Sights and institutions ==
- Hotel Camino Real (Camino Real Hotels), Mariano Escobedo 700 – Legorreta's 1968 hotel, with art by Rufino Tamayo, Alexander Calder and others
- Parroquia de Cristo Rey y Santa Mónica, Leibnitz 50 – Catholic parish church, the only religious building by Mario Pani
- Casa-estudio Rufino Tamayo, Leibnitz 248 – house and studio by Max Cetto, 1949
- National Council to Prevent Discrimination (CONAPRED), Dante 14 – federal agency headquarters
- Banco Plata, Mariano Escobedo 476 – bank headquarters
- Torre Puerta Reforma – proposed skyscraper at the corner of Melchor Ocampo and Reforma

=== Diplomatic missions ===
- Embassy of Bolivia, Goethe 104
- Embassy of the Czech Republic, Cuvier 22
- Embassy of North Korea, Halley 12
- Embassy of the Philippines, Avenida Thiers 111
- Delegation of the Government of Catalonia, Leibnitz 77

=== In film and television ===
- Como dice el dicho, Televisa series; its café set is at Gutenberg 77
- Intimidades de Shakespeare y Víctor Hugo (2008), documentary by Yulene Olaizola about her grandmother's guest house at the corner of Shakespeare and Víctor Hugo streets

== Notable residents ==
- Plutarco Elías Calles, president of Mexico
- Aarón Sáenz, politician and businessman
- Ricardo Martínez de Hoyos, painter
- Federico Cantú, painter
- Rufino Tamayo, painter

== Gallery ==
Hotel Camino Real

Hotel Camino Real

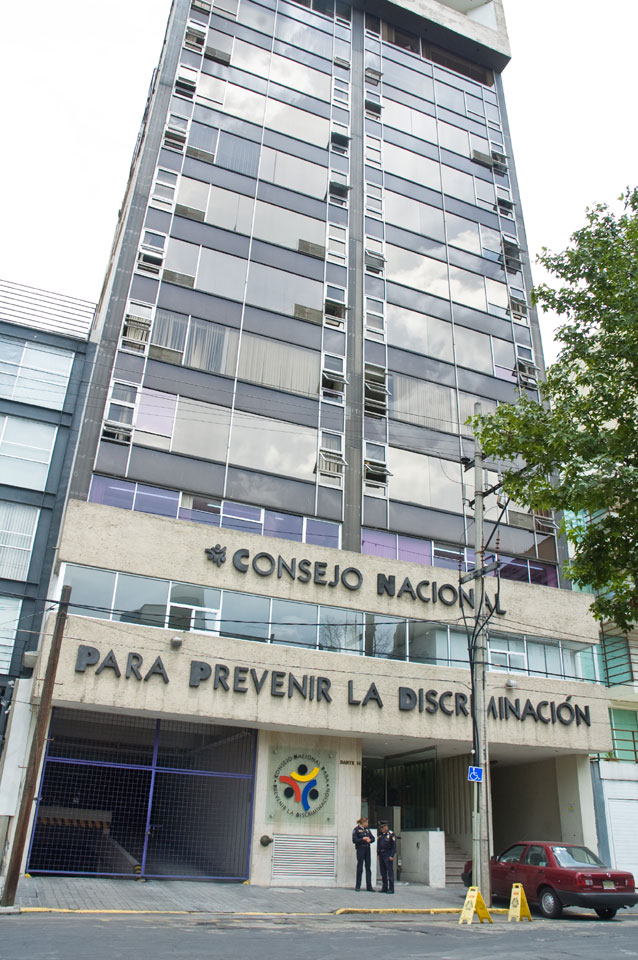
CONAPRED, Dante 14

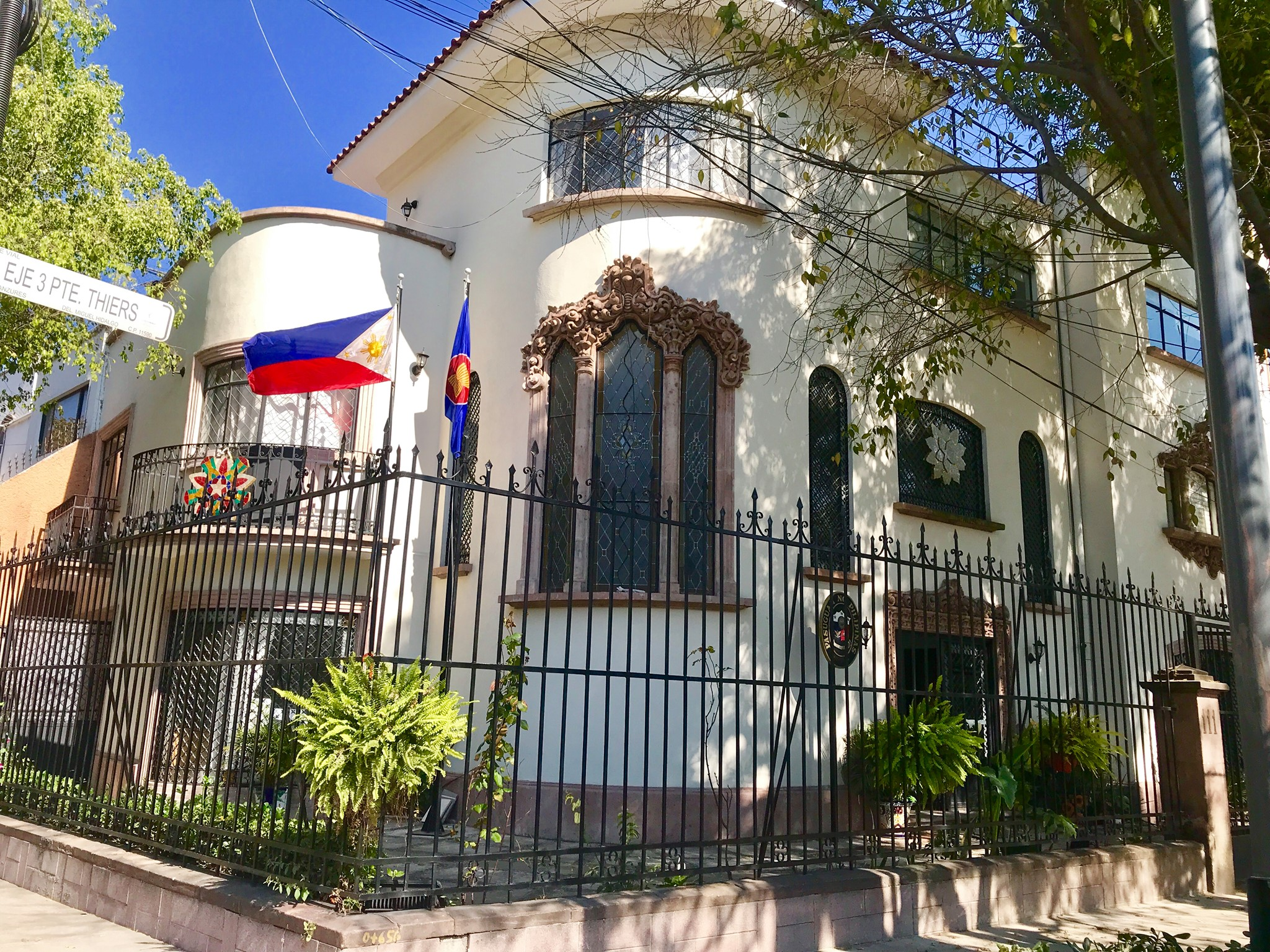
Embassy of the Philippines, Avenida Thiers

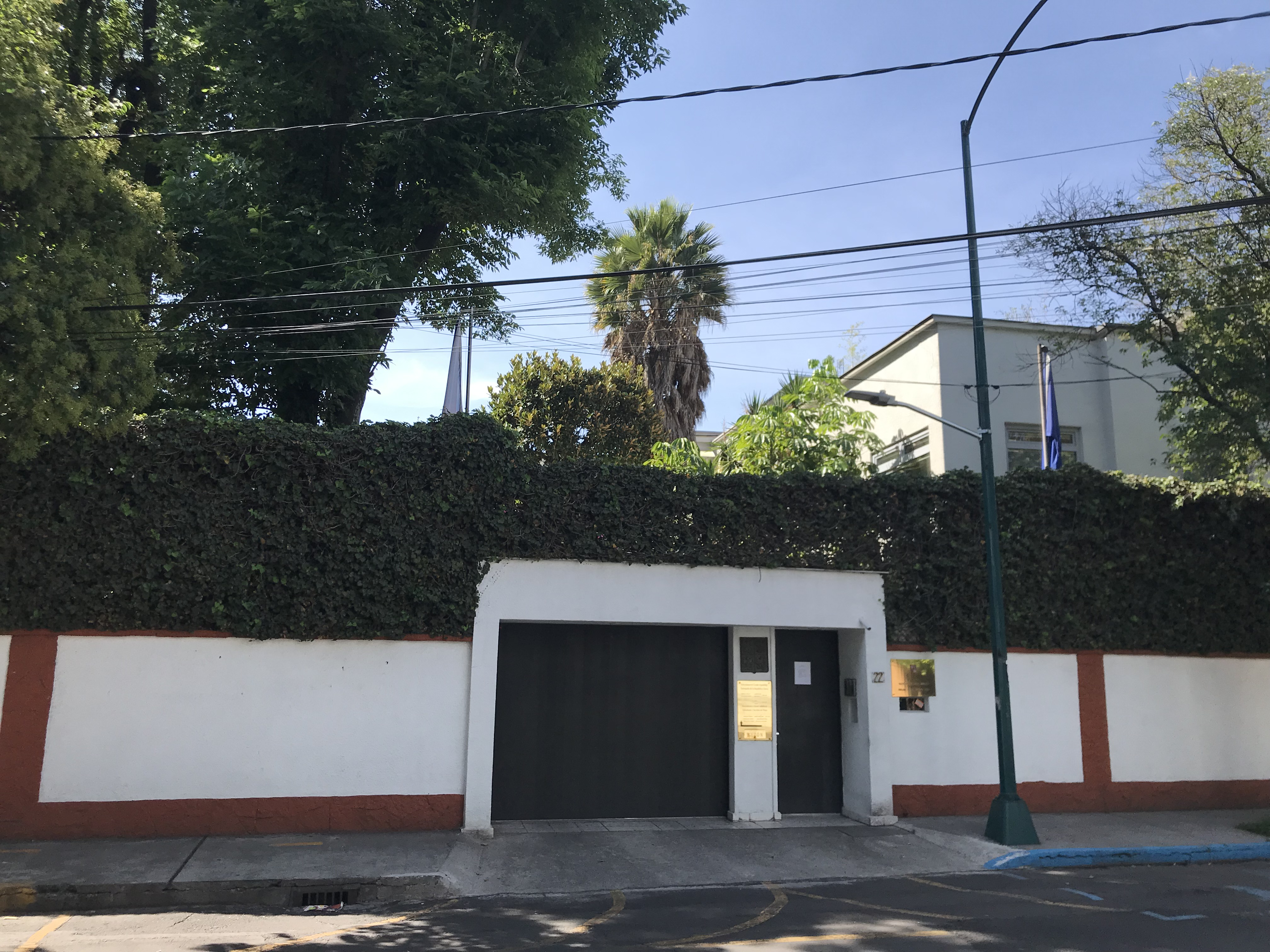
Embassy of the Czech Republic, Cuvier

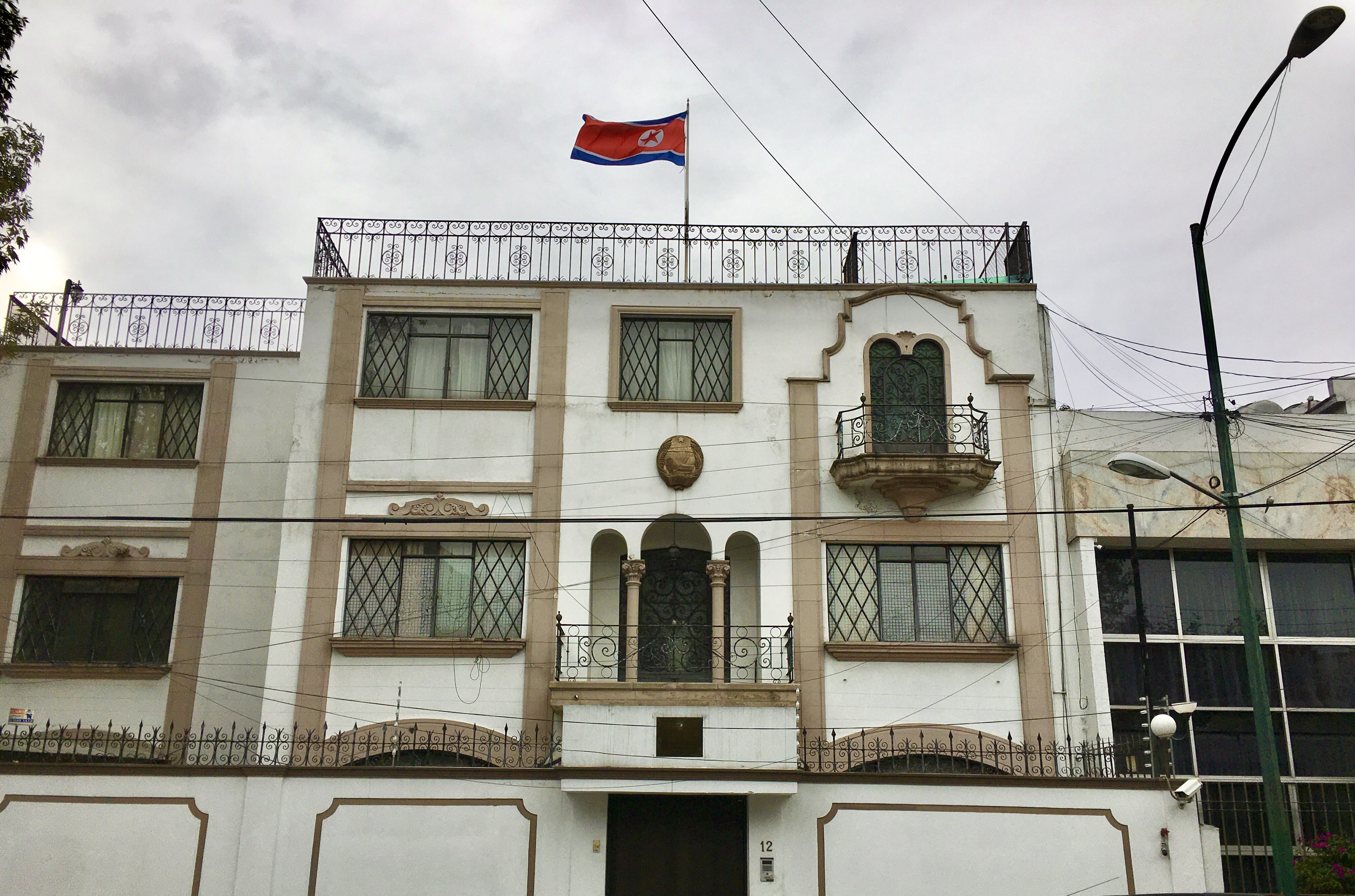
Embassy of North Korea, Halley

Garden on Calle Shakespeare

Calle Shakespeare

Building in Anzures

Torre Ejecutiva Pemex seen from Anzures
