= Museo del Galeón =

Maritime museum in Pasay, Philippines

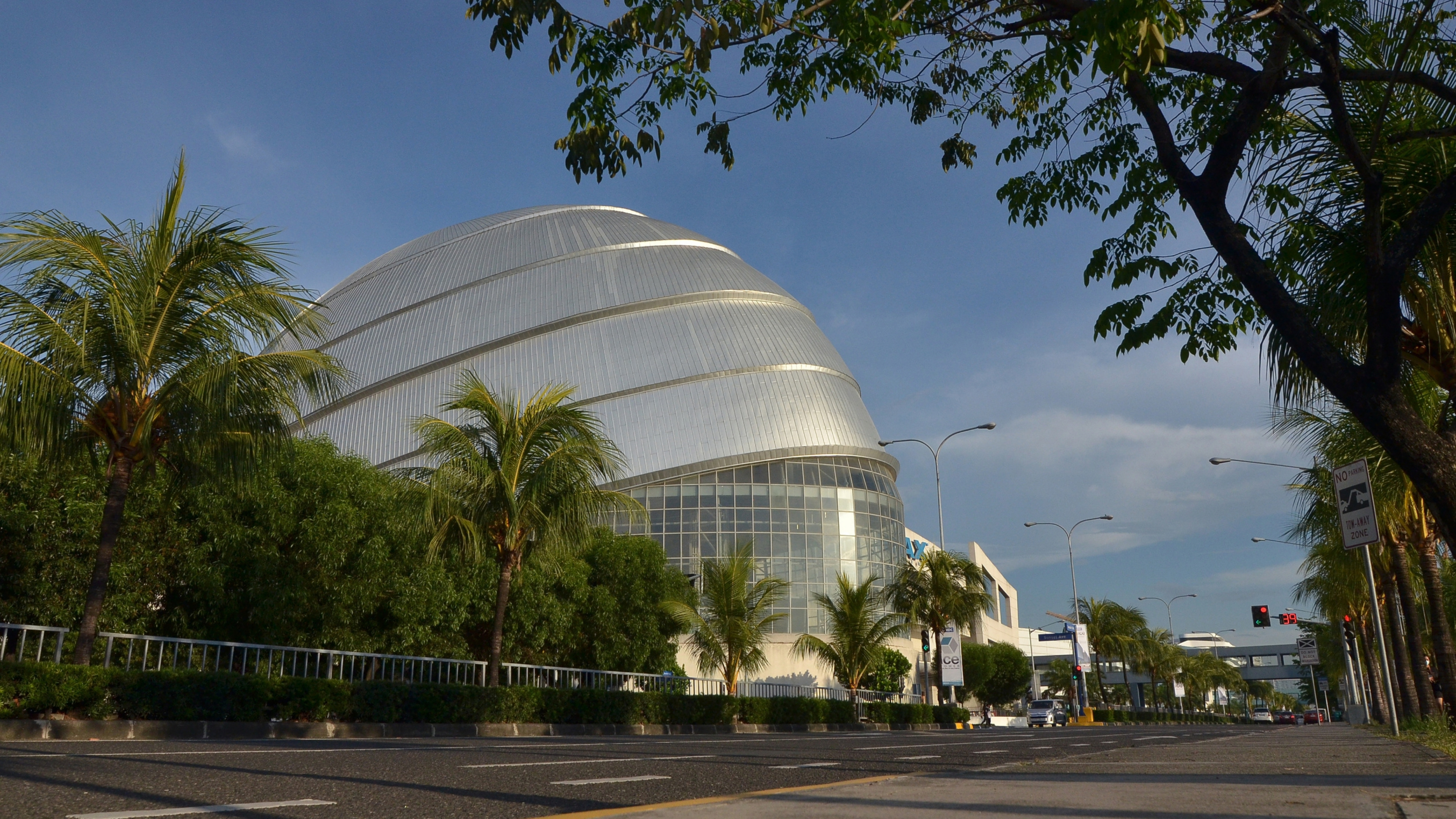
- The Galeón dome as of 2025
- Type: Maritime heritage museum
- Executive director: Manolo Quezon
- President: Doris Magsaysay Ho
- Chairperson: Carlos Salinas
- Owner: Museo Del Galeón Inc.
- Website: museodelgaleon.org
- Building details
- Location in Metro Manila Location in Luzon Location in the Philippines

General information
- Status: Completed
- Type: Dome
- Location: Bay City, Pasay, Seaside Boulevard corner Sunset Avenue
- Coordinates: 14°32′13″N 120°58′48″E
- Construction started: November 2014
- Opened: May 1, 2026
- Cost: ₱250 million

Technical details
- Floor count: 4
- Grounds: 5,000 m^{2} (54,000 sq ft)

Museo del Galeón (lit. 'Galleon museum') is a maritime heritage museum within the SM Mall of Asia complex in Pasay, Metro Manila, Philippines. The museum features the Manila–Acapulco galleon trade and houses a full-scale representation of a galleon within its interior. The museum opened to the public on May 1, 2026.

== Development ==
=== Conceptualization ===
Efforts to build a galleon museum date back to 2010 when Foreign Affairs Secretary Alberto Romulo organized a diplomatic reception attended by ambassadors from 32 countries linked to the historical Galleon Trade. In the meeting, plans to build the museum were discussed.

Then-Philippine Senator Edgardo Angara went to Mexico City to meet with heads of relevant institutions to lobby for support for the project to build a galleon museum. Talks with the National Archives of Mexico, Colegio de Mexico, National Autonomous University of Mexico, and Universidad Autónoma de San Luis Potosí to discuss a research collaboration with Philippine universities and academics.

Mexican firms Grupo Carso of Carlos Slim Helú, FEMSA, and Cemex, as well as Guerrero State government, stated that they will back the galleon museum project. The plans to build a galleon museum were supported by Mexican politicians and figures such as Margarita Zavala, First Lady of the then President Felipe Calderón, Senators Teofilo Torres Corzo, and Humberto Mayans, as well as Mexican academics and publications also expressed support.

Philippine-based cultural agencies requested government seed funding from the Philippine government while a public fundraising effort was made. A presidential instruction by President Benigno Aquino III was issued to provide financial support. However, this instruction was unsuccessful. Henry Sy, President of SM Prime Holdings, later offered to build the museum and donate a lot within the SM Mall of Asia complex.

The Museo de Galleon Foundation was created for the project. In mid-2015, Henry Sy met with Mexican billionaire Carlos Slim in Mexico, with the latter agreeing to donate artifacts to the SM Group for the museum.

=== Construction and delayed museum opening ===
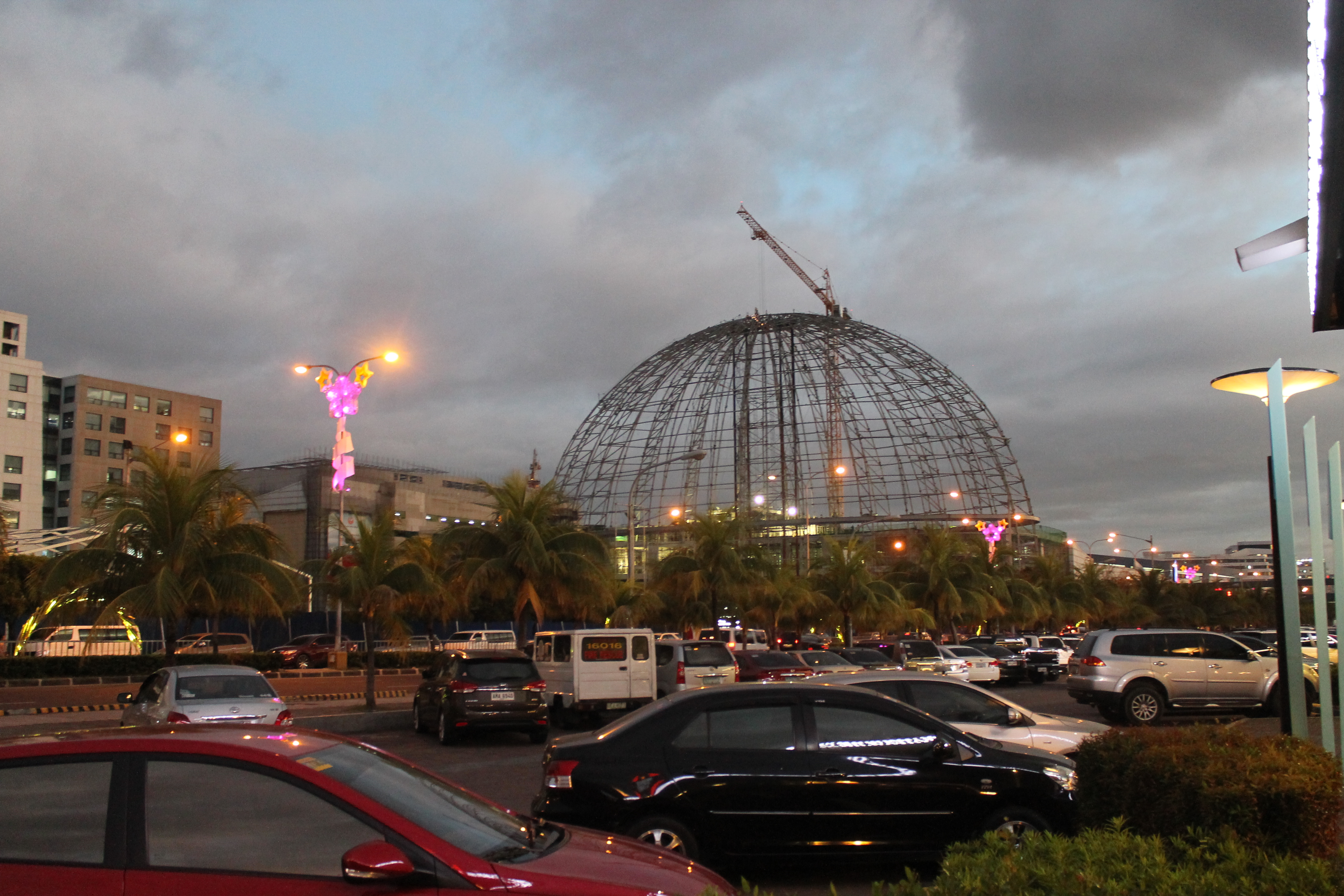
The dome structure under-construction. November 2015

The initial estimate for the construction of the museum, initially dubbed "The Galeón: Manila–Acapulco Galleon Museum", was pegged at ₱250 million, an amount which would be spent by the SM Group. Construction began in November 2014 and was initially planned for completion by late 2015. The museum was then planned to be opened in the 2nd quarter of 2016, but the opening date was moved at least three times to the 3rd quarter of the same year, to early 2017, and later to August 8, 2017. This date was planned to be the soft opening of the museum. On that date, which coincides with the 50th anniversary of the foundation of the Association of Southeast Asian Nations (ASEAN), an "executive preview" of the museum was held, although the museum itself was yet to open.

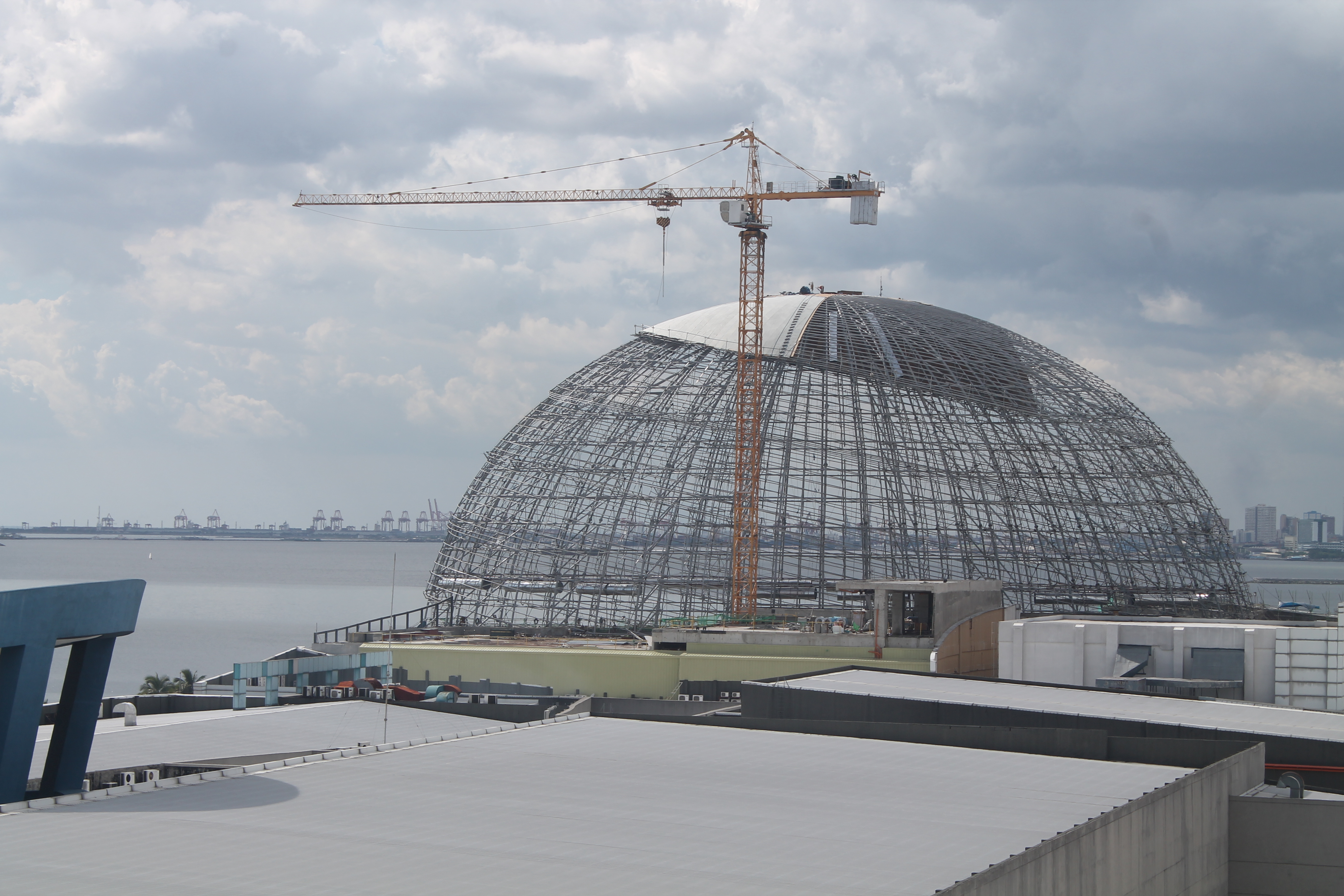
The dome as of June 2016

An architectural firm based in Mexico, along with architects based in Hong Kong and Florida, United States, were also involved in the project. The dome structure was built on a 5,000 square meters (54,000 sq ft) lot provided by the SM Group.

In April 2021, the Pasay City Government and SM Group announced plans to temporarily use the dome structure as a vaccination hub as a response against the COVID-19 pandemic. The vaccination hub, also known as the "Giga Vaccination Center," was opened on May 7. It was considered to be one of the country's largest vaccination centers, capable of vaccinating 2,000 people daily.

The space meant for the museum was formally turned over by SM Prime to the Museo del Galeón Foundation in October 2025. Work resumed for the museum.

The museum opened to the public on May 1, 2026, after years of delays. While the first two galleries of the museum opened, the museum is still under development and is set to be fully completed by October 2026.

== Features ==
=== Museum building ===
The Museo del Galeón is housed inside a four-storey dome-shaped structure and has an area of around 9,000 square meters (97,000 sq ft) of total exhibition space.

=== Espíritu Santo replica ===
The displayed replica of the Espiritu Santo

The Museo del Galeón features a full-scale representation of the Espíritu Santo galleon inside the museum. The original Espíritu Santo is a wooden sail ship built by forced laborers in 1603 for the Manila-Acapulco trade. Visitors can walk on the decks of the 40-meter (130 ft) long and 30-meter (98 ft) high replica ship. The interior also has the Sea of Lights, a LED display wrapped around the dome which features depictions of seascapes, storms, and constellations. The replica is built mostly on fiberglass and other materials. Originally, there were plans to let visitors of the museum observe the construction of a full-scale 60-meter (200 ft) long replica of the galleon, a process projected to last around two years. Instead, the galleon was finished before the museum's opening in 2026.

=== Galleries ===
The museum has four planned galleries: the "Ancient Mariners and Their Sea Routes", "Circling the World and Back", "The New World and the Confluence of Cultures" and "The Philippines as a Maritime Nation". The first two galleries are accessible to the public on opening day in May 2026, with the other two yet to be opened.

- Ancient Mariners and Their Sea Routes – features the maritime culture of the people of the Philippine archipelago during the pre-colonial era or before the arrival of the Spanish. It showcases individual mariners, pre-Spanish era sea routes, and a mini balanghai.
- Circling the World and Back – focuses on the Magellan expedition in the Philippines, including exhibits linked to key local figures like Lapulapu and Rajah Humabon

=== Other earlier plans ===
Other earlier reported plans include the Center for Pacific Trade and Cultural Studies, a research institute dedicated to the galleon trade.

== See also ==
- Mexico-Philippines relations
