= Humberto García =

Humberto García may refer to:

- Humberto Leal Garcia (1973–2011), Mexican criminal and inmate on death row in Texas
- Humberto Tony García, American voice actor and announcer
- Humberto García Reyes (born 1953), Mexican politician
- Humberto García (footballer) (born 1974), Paraguayan football manager and former player
- Humberto Garcia (writer), American writer and academic
- Humberto Garcia, guitar player on 4 (Kumbia Kings album)
