= Humberto Medina =

Humberto Medina may refer to:

- Humberto Medina (dancer), Cuban dancer
- Humberto Medina (footballer) (1942–2011), Mexican footballer
