= Humberto Hernández =

Humberto Hernández may refer to:

- Humberto Hernández (cyclist) (born 1971), Colombian road cyclist
- Humberto Hernández (footballer) (born 1985), Mexican football (soccer) player
- Humberto Hernández Haddad (born 1951), Mexican lawyer and politician
- Humberto Hernandez Jr. (born 1962), American politician
