= Embassy of the Philippines, Mexico City =

Diplomatic mission of the Philippines in Mexico

Embassy of the Philippines, Mexico City Pasuguan ng Pilipinas sa Lungsod ng Mehiko Embajada de Filipinas en la Ciudad de México

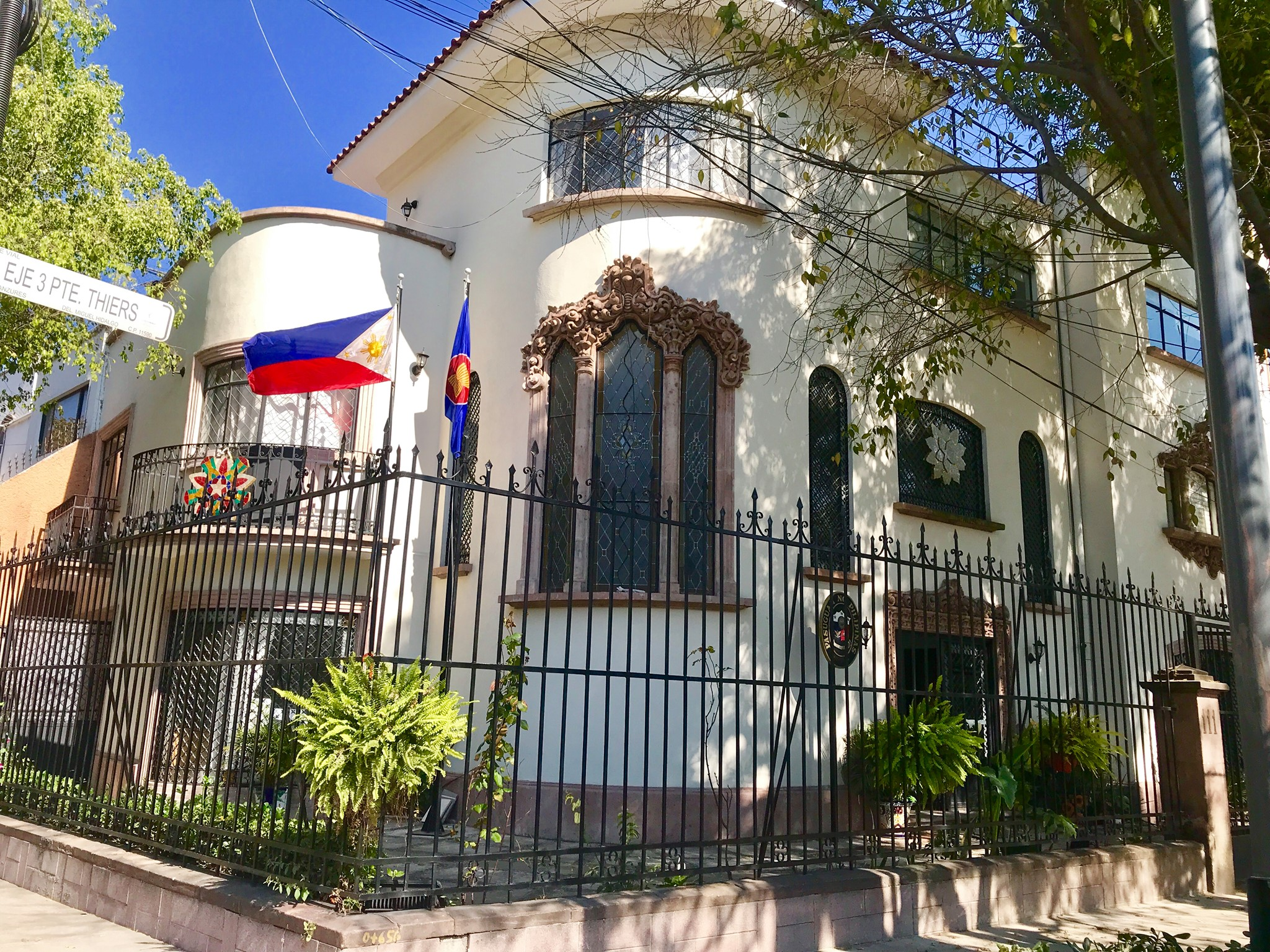
- Location: Mexico City
- Address: Avenida Thiers 111, Colonia Anzures, Alcaldía Miguel Hidalgo
- Coordinates: 19°25′59.9″N 99°10′41.4″W
- Chargé d'affaires: Ralf G. Roldan
- Website: http://mexicope.dfa.gov.ph

The Embassy of the Philippines in Mexico City is the diplomatic mission of the Republic of the Philippines to the United Mexican States. It is currently at Avenida Thiers 111 in Colonia Anzures, part of the alcaldía (municipality) of Miguel Hidalgo in northwestern Mexico City.

== History ==
The Philippines first opened a diplomatic mission in Mexico with the opening of a legation on April 23, 1953, shortly after the two countries established full diplomatic relations, with Mariano Ezpeleta serving as the mission's first minister. It was upgraded to a full embassy in 1960, with Octavio L. Maloles becoming the first resident Philippine ambassador after presenting his credentials to President Adolfo López Mateos on September 12, 1961.

After a massive expansion of the Philippines' diplomatic presence abroad during the presidency of Gloria Macapagal Arroyo, in 2010 Senator Franklin Drilon questioned the need for embassies in countries with small Filipino communities, and called for a review of the Philippines' diplomatic presence worldwide. This led to the closure of ten posts under Arroyo's successor, Benigno Aquino III, and ultimately to the closure of the embassies in Havana and Caracas by October 31, 2012. The embassy's jurisdiction, which at the time consisted only of Mexico and Central America, was expanded in 2013 to include Cuba, Venezuela and the Dominican Republic to account for the closure of both posts, although jurisdiction over Venezuela was subsequently transferred to the Philippine Embassy in Brasília, and later to the Philippine Embassy in Bogotá.

The embassy's chancery, at the time occupying the first two stories of an eight-story building in the centrally located Delegación Cuauhtémoc, was badly damaged in the 2017 Puebla earthquake, requiring it to temporarily operate from the ambassadorial residence as it was vacated. The current chancery was formally opened on March 14, 2018, coinciding with the embassy's official celebrations for International Women's Day.

== Staff and activities ==
The Philippine Embassy in Mexico City is provisionally headed by a chargé d'affaires, pending the reception of a new ambassador appointed by the Philippine government. The current chargé d'affaires is Ralf G. Roldan, while the last resident ambassador was Lilybeth R. Deapera, who was appointed to the position by President Bongbong Marcos on September 1, 2022. Prior to her appointment as ambassador, Deapera, a career diplomat, served as Consul General at the Philippine Consulate General in Macau. Her appointment was confirmed by the Commission on Appointments on September 28, 2022, and she presented her credentials to Mexican President Andrés Manuel López Obrador on May 25, 2023.

Many of the embassy's activities center around promoting the deep cultural ties between the Philippines and Mexico. These included exhibiting the paintings of Filipino painter Manuel Baldemor at the Fort of San Diego in Acapulco, hosting a book launch on the cultural relations between the two countries in 2017, organizing events surrounding the centennial of Philippine cinema at the 2019 Guanajuato International Film Festival, and supporting a master class on Filipino cuisine at the Mexico City campus of Le Cordon Bleu. Some of these activities, such as celebrating the Manila galleon trade, are directly related to the history of both countries as former Spanish colonies, with at least three ambassadors having made courtesy calls to the mayor of Acapulco as a result.

Aside from promoting ties between the Philippines and Mexico, like other missions the embassy also provides assistance to Filipinos within its jurisdiction, whether resident or visiting. It has offered to evacuate and repatriate Filipinos in Venezuela and Nicaragua when those countries experienced unrest, while also offering assistance to Filipinos potentially affected by the 2018 Volcán de Fuego eruption in Guatemala, and facilitating the visit of Filipino delegates attending the 2019 World Youth Day in Panama with a hotline specifically designated for their use.

The jurisdiction of the embassy is expected to change with the opening of new missions within Central America, namely the future reopening of the embassy in Havana, and the possible opening of an embassy in Panama City.

== See also ==
- Filipino immigration to Mexico
- List of diplomatic missions of the Philippines
- Mexico–Philippines relations
