= Guaracheros de Regla =

Guaracheros de Regla was the name of a carnival comparsa of Havana, Cuba. Created by Humberto Medina, known as the Guarachero Mayor.

== Overview ==
The group started in 1959 in Regla and in 1960 were invited to the Havana carnivals. One of the top dance groups during the 1960s. As was the traditional custom, they started in La Punta on the Malecón.They danced southward on Prado Avenue to circle in front of the Capitol, where the judges would assess their mastery in the competition.

Guaracheros de Regla was an extremely accomplished "comparsa" (dance group), usually winning the top honor in the comparsa contest every year at the Havana carnival. Originally young adults of college age and older made up the body of dancers, but when Raul Castro decided in 1965 to put every male older than 15 years in military service, all the dancers who were able to join the comparsa were barely in their teens.
