= Mexican settlement in the Philippines =

Mesoamerican peoples in the Southeast Asian country

Mexicans in the Philippines Mexicanos en las Filipinas Ang mga Mehikano sa Pilipinas
Total population
- 377 (Mexican nationals in the country; unknown number of Mexican descent) 2.33% of the population in the Spanish-Philippines during the 1700s.

Regions with significant populations
- Metro Manila, Cebu City, Zamboanga City and Bacolod.

Languages
- Spanish, Tagalog and other Philippine languages

Religion
- Roman Catholicism and Iglesia Filipina Independiente

Related ethnic groups
- Mexicans of European descent, Indigenous peoples of Mexico, Mestizos in Mexico

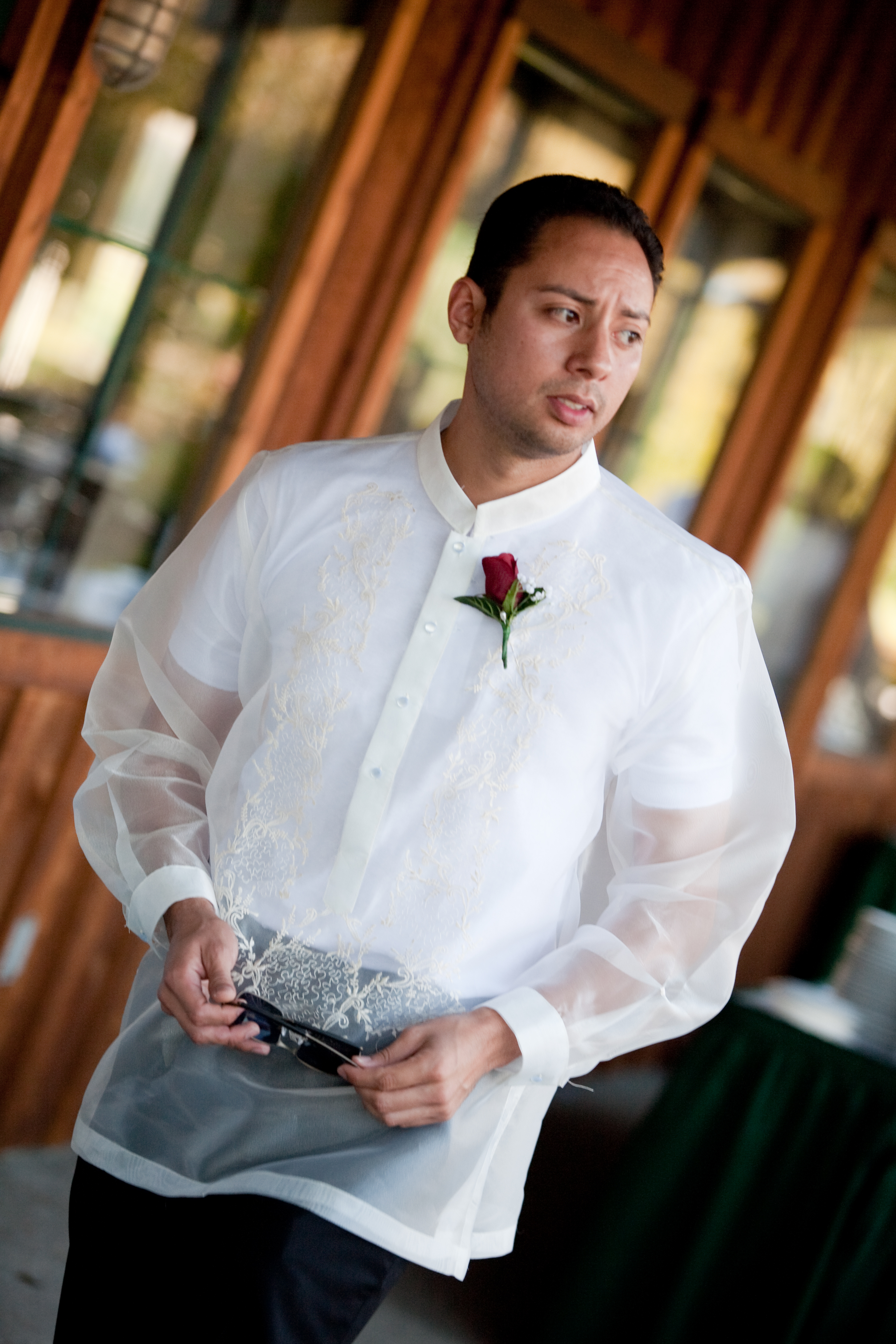
Barong with mandarin collar. This picture was taken at my Filipino/Mexican wedding on August 8, 2009

Mexican settlement in the Philippines comprises a multilingual Filipino ethnic group composed of Philippine citizens with Mexican ancestry. The immigration of Mexicans to the Philippines dates back to the Spanish period.

== History ==
Mexican immigration to the Philippines mainly occurred during the Hispanic period. Between 1565-1821, the Philippines were in fact administered from the Viceroyalty of New Spain's capital, Mexico City. During this period trans-Pacific trade brought many Mexicans and Spaniards to the Philippines as sailors, crew, prisoners, slaves, adventurers and soldiers in the Manila-Acapulco Galleons which was the main form of communication between the two Spanish territories. Similarly the route brought various different Filipinos, such as native Filipinos, Spanish Filipinos (Philippine-born Insulares), Chinese Filipinos (See Chinese immigration to Mexico), and other Asian groups to Mexico.

According to Stephanie Mawson in her M.Phil thesis entitled Between Loyalty and Disobedience: The Limits of Spanish Domination in the Seventeenth Century Pacific, in the 1600s there were thousands of Latin American settlers sent per year to the Philippines by the Spaniards and around that time frame the Spaniards had cumulatively sent 15,600 settlers from Peru and Mexico while there were only 600 Spaniards from Spain, that supplemented a Philippine population of only 667,612 people. Due to the initial low population count, people of Latin American and Hispanic descent quickly spread across the territory. Several hundred Tlaxcalan soldiers sailed to the islands in the 16th century, with some settling permanently and contributing numerous Nahuatl words to the Filipino languages. It was royal policy to use Peruvian and Mexican soldiers as colonists to the Philippines.

Geographic distribution and year of settlement of the Latin-American immigrant soldiers assigned to the Philippines in the 1600s.
Location	1603	1636	1642	1644	1654	1655	1670	1672
Manila	900	446	—	407	821	799	708	667
Fort Santiago	—	22	—	—	50	—	86	81
Cavite	—	70	—	—	89	—	225	211
Cagayan	46	80	—	—	—	—	155	155
Calamianes	—	—	—	—	—	—	73	73
Caraga	—	45	—	—	—	—	81	81
Cebu	86	50	—	—	—	—	135	135
Formosa	—	180	—	—	—	—	—	—
Moluccas	80	480	507	—	389	—	—	—
Otón	66	50	—	—	—	—	169	169
Zamboanga	—	210	—	—	184	—	—	—
Other	255	—	—	—	—	—	—	—
	—	—	—	—	—	—	—	—
Total Reinforcements	1,533	1,633	2,067	2,085	n/a	n/a	1,632	1,572

The book Intercolonial Intimacies Relinking Latin/o America to the Philippines, 1898–1964 by Paula C. Park cites "Forzados y reclutas: los criollos novohispanos en Asia (1756-1808)", gave a higher number of later Mexican soldier-immigrants to the Philippines, pegging the number at 35,000 immigrants in the 1700s, in a Philippine population which was only around 1.5 Million, thus forming 2.33% of the population. Corroborating these Spanish era estimates, an anthropological study published in the Journal of Human Biology and researched by Matthew Go, using physical anthropology, concluded that 12.7% of Filipinos can be classified as Hispanic (Latin American mestizos or Malay-Spanish mestizos), 7.3% as Indigenous American, African at 4.5% and European at 2.7%. Thus, as much as 20% of those sampled bodies, which were representative of the Philippines, translating to about 20 million Filipinos, can be physically classified as Latin American in appearance. As a result, German ethnographer Fedor Jagor, using Spanish censuses, estimated that one-third of the island of Luzon, which holds half of the Philippine population, had varying degrees of Spanish and Latin American ancestry.

In contrast, a different anthropology study using Morphoscopic ancestry estimates in Filipino crania using multivariate probit regression models by J. T. Hefner, published on year 2020, while analyzing Historic and Modern samples of skeletons in the Philippines, paint a different picture, in that, when the reference group for "Asian" was Thailand (Southeast Asians) rather than Chinese, Japanese, and Vietnamese; and the reference group for "Hispanic" were Colombians (South Americans) rather than Mexicans, the combined historical and modern sample results for Filipinos, yielded the following ratios: Asian at 48.6%, African at 32.9%, and only a small portion classifying as either European at 12.9%, and finally for Hispanic at 5.7%.

Nevertheless, during the Mexican War of Independence Spain feared that the large Mexican population in the Philippines would incite the Filipinos to rebel, thus Spaniards direct from Spain were imported and the Latin American class in the Philippines were displaced and were forced into a lower rank of the caste system.

During the Spanish period, the islands formed part of the Viceroyalty of New Spain, along with other areas of the Pacific Ocean such as the Marianas and the Caroline Islands and during a short period in northern Taiwan. The Spaniards built trade routes from Mexico to the Philippines, primarily from their starting points of Acapulco and Puerto Vallarta, with their final destination being Manila, the current capital of the Philippines. The Spanish ships on these routes were known as the Manila galleons.

Mexican (or rather, New Spaniard) immigrants to the Philippines belonged to different ethnic groups such as indigenous people, mestizos and Creoles who mainly mixed with the local population, which increased the number of descendants with Spanish surnames. The construction of the military fort of Zamboanga used the help of these Mexican immigrants who had already settled in the islands. The Mexican legacy in the Philippines, consisting of marriage between the Spanish and the indigenous culture of origin (Maya and Nahuatl), has been marked in these islands. Many words that originated from Nahuatl, a language spoken by the descendants of the indigenous Mexican Aztecs and Tlaxcalans, have influenced some local languages of the Philippines.

== See also ==
- Filipino people of Spanish ancestry
- Ethnic groups in the Philippines
- Spanish settlement in the Philippines
- Spanish language in the Philippines
- Mexico–Philippines relations
- Manila galleon
- Landing of the first Filipinos
- Filipino immigration to Mexico
- Mestizos in Mexico
- Filipino mestizo
- Chamorro people
