= Humberto Megget =

Uruguayan writer and poet (1926–1951)

Humberto Megget (1926–1951) was an Uruguayan writer and poet.

== Poems in Pop Culture ==
Some of Megget's poems have been popularized by various popular Uruguayan singers:

- "You Can Drink in the Sun", performed by Luis Trochon (cassette and vinyl Ayuí / Tacuabé "From singing handwriting." 1983)
- "I"; music by Claudio Lembo. Performed by the group Salitre (cassette "Salitre". Ayuí / Tacuabé, 1989).
- "Now that It's All", played by Gaston Ciarlo ("The Dino") and Numa Moraes.
- "I Have Wanted to Laugh Raquel", sung by Eduardo Darnauchans.
- "In the Sea the Fish Are", played by Andrew Stagnaro (album "The Ivy and the Wall." 2004).

== Works ==
- New Sun Party (Montevideo, 1945)
- New Sun Party (Reissue enlarged. Number, Montevideo, 1952)
- New Sun Party and Other Poems (Montevideo, 1965)
- Humberto Megget Collected Works (Editions of the Eastern Band, Montevideo, 1991)
