= Colonia Verónica Anzures =

Verónica Anzures
- Neighborhood of Mexico City
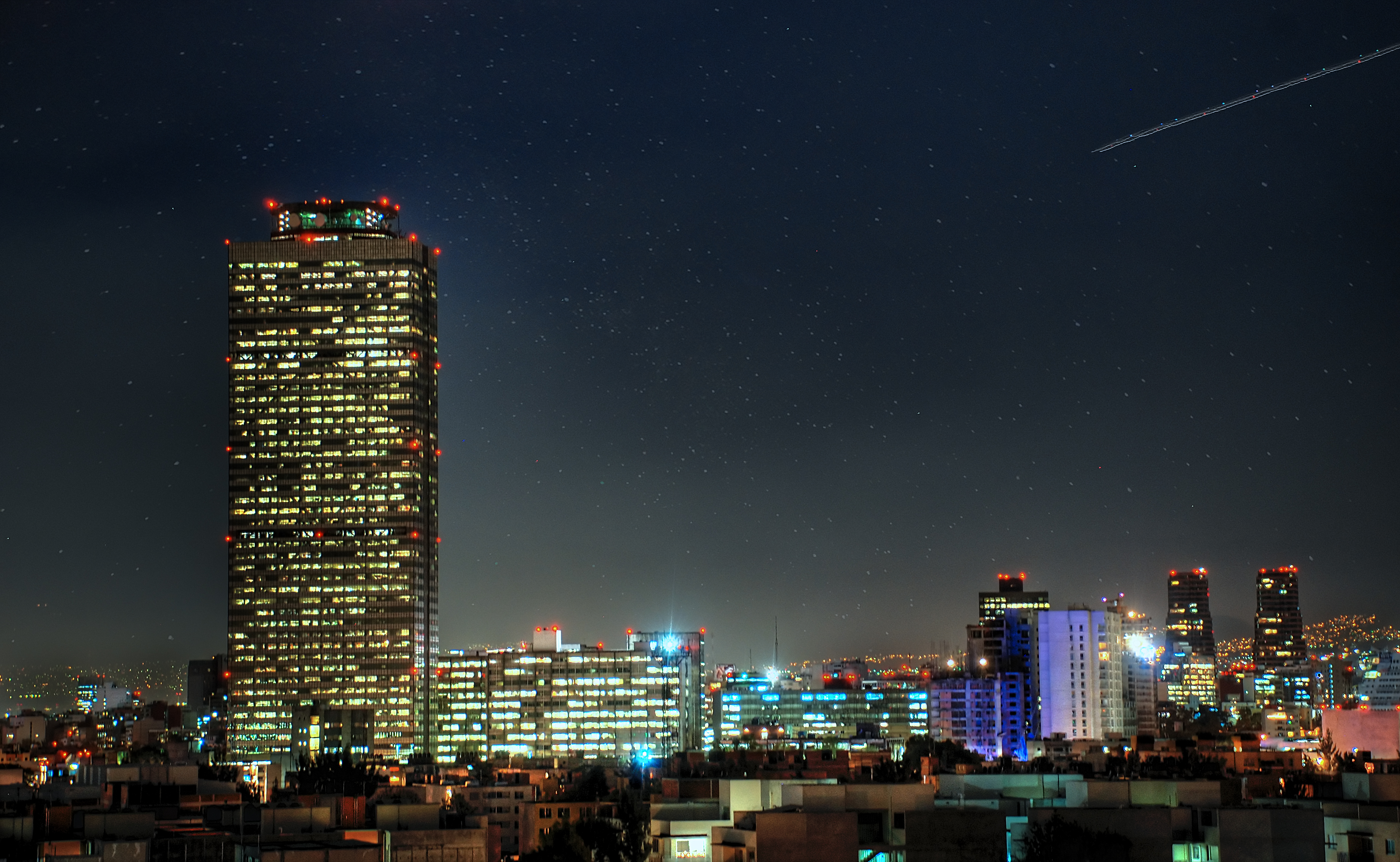
- Torre Pemex and colonia Verónica Anzures, the skyline of Polanco is behind
- Country: Mexico
- City: Mexico City
- Borough: Miguel Hidalgo
- Postal code: 11300

Colonia Verónica Anzures is a colonia of Mexico City located in the Miguel Hidalgo borough. The neighborhood is a residential area but it also houses some office buildings, most importantly the Torre Ejecutiva Pemex.

== Location ==
The neighborhood is bordered by:

- Av. Marina Nacional to the northeast, across which is Colonia Tlaxpana and Colonia Anáhuac
- Bahía de San Hipólito street on the northwest, across which is Colonia Anáhuac
- Av. Ejército Nacional on the south, across which is Colonia Anzures
- Circuito Interior Melchor Ocampo on the east, across which is Colonia Cuauhtémoc in the Cuauhtémoc borough

== History ==
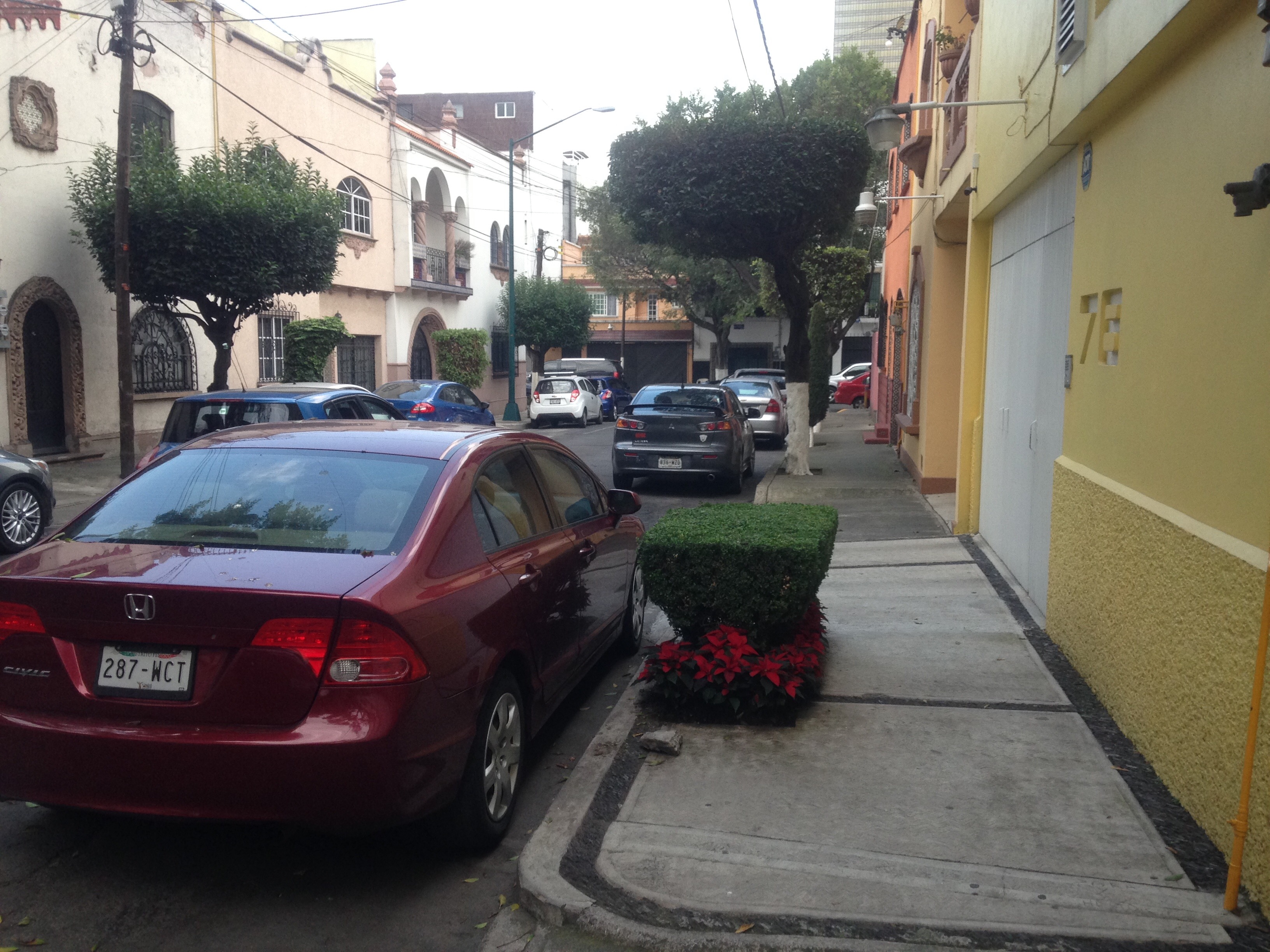
Bahía de Montejo street

During the late years of the 1800s, Chapultepec was still surrounded by estates, such as the Anzures, Polanco and La Teja ranches and the La Condesa and Los Morales haciendas.

In 1920, the owner of the Los Morales hacienda, Eduardo Cuevas Rubio, dies, leaving in his testament instructions for the partition of the hacienda in five sections. Sections I and II, then the closest to the center of Mexico City, became the colonia Verónica Anzures. An area that, at the time, was known only as La Verónica, due to the proximity of the Calzada de La Verónica (today Circuito Interior Melchor Ocampo).

In the 1950s, Verónica Anzures started to develop as a residential zone, described by anthropologist Luis Barjau as "an urban zone in the Federal District of middle-class pretentious residents, who wanted to emulate the then sumptuous Polanco, but smaller".

== Description ==
Verónica Anzures has, mainly, residential buildings of art deco and colonial revival styles. The colonia also houses several commercial buildings, Torre Ejecutiva Pemex, headquarters of state-owned Pemex, one of the largest petroleum companies in the world and shopping center Plaza de las Estrellas, being the two most important.

From the first decade of the 21st century, the neighborhood has experienced a process of gentrification, resulting in the restoration of old buildings and the construction of new big residential buildings.
