= Humberto Viola =

- Born: 1943
- Died: December 1, 1974 (aged 30–31); San Miguel de Tucumán, Argentina
- Military career
- Allegiance: Argentina
- Branch: Argentinian Army
- Rank: Captain

Captain Humberto Viola (1943 – December 1, 1974 in San Miguel de Tucumán) was an Argentine army officer, who was assassinated in 1974 because of being part of the military, by the People's Revolutionary Army guerrilla organization. Along with him his 3-year-old daughter María Cristina was also killed.

Captain Humberto Viola was featured in the province of Tucuman where he worked in intelligence

Viola was killed while arriving with his car at his parents home along with his wife María Cristina Picon and his two small daughters María Cristina of 3 years and María Fernanda of 5 years. His daughter María Cristina was also killed while his daughter María Fernanda was seriously injured yet survived. His wife died in 2021.
