= High Hill Entertainment =

American video production company

- Formation: 2007; 19 years ago
- Founders: Carlos Mesber
- Founded at: Miami, Florida
- Type: Privately owned company
- Legal status: Limited liability company (LLC)
- Headquarters: 690 Lincoln Road, Suite 202, Miami Beach, FL 33139, United States
- Official language: English, Spanish
- President: Maria Elena Useche
- Website: HighHillEntertainment.com

High Hill Entertainment is a Miami-based independent video production company. It was founded in 2007 by Carlos Mesber actor and producer. High Hill does work across Latin America and counts Univision, Telemundo, MGM, AMC Networks and the National Basketball Association (NBA) among its clients.

High Hill produces several popular TV shows such as Sabrosa Pasión and Suelta La Sopa.

== Major productions ==
=== Sabrosa Pasión ===
Sabrosa Pasión is a TV show both in Latin America and among Spanish speakers in the United States. The show is a combination talk show (about talk show about relationships, sex, food and tips on health and fitness) with Latin stars and cooking show hosted by Chef Carlos Mesber. On the show, Mesber prepares dishes of international cuisine followed by conversations with celebrities. The celebrities are typically famous Latin American actors, actresses and models. Its 2013 season, for example, featured Mexican actresses Angelica Maria Paola Toyos, Adriana Fonseca, Paty Alvarez, Rosalinda Rodríguez and Venezuelan actresses Natalia Streignard, Sonya Smith, Gabriela Spanic, Scarlet Ortiz.

=== Suelta la Sopa ===
Suelta la Sopa is a Latin American celebrity gossip and entertainment news TV show. The show is hosted by Latin American talk show host Jorge Bernal. The show features celebrity interviews; and a "docudrama" narrative of the private lives of celebrities.
