= Humberto Tony García =

American actor

For namesakes, see Announcer (disambiguation).

Humberto Antonio García (better known as Tony García) is a Miami, Florida based voice actor and announcer. He has worked on publicity campaigns in the United States and Latin America.

García has worked in multiple projects, including movie trailers; telenovela launches; soccer broadcasts; entertainment shows such as El Gordo y La Flaca, Chismes y mas, Suelta la Sopa; musical spectacles such as the Latin Grammys, Premios Billboards, and Premio Lo Nuestro; promotions for Univision Network, Telemundo Network, the History Channel, Almavision LATV; and commercials for Lexus, Budweiser, Allstate and Royal Caribbean.

Humberto Garcia worked as voice over promotion for Univision Network and main voice over for Suelta La Sopa (Drop), a celebrity gossip show produced by Telemundo and High Hill Entertainment. Tony is also the host for El Top 10, a top-10 countdown show on 87.7 FM in Miami and CVC LA VOZ Satellite Radio Network .
