= Humberto (footballer, born 1966) =

Brazilian footballer

Personal information
- Full name: Humberto Mauro da Silva Teixeira
- Date of birth: 10 December 1966 (age 59)
- Place of birth: Volta Redonda, RJ, Brazil
- Height: 1.72 m (5 ft 8 in)
- Position: Striker

Youth career
- Fluminense

Senior career*
Years	Team	Apps	(Gls)
1987–1989	Volta Redonda		
1990	Aparecida-SP		
1990–1994	Volta Redonda		
1994	Fluminense		
1995	Grêmio		
1995–1996	Vitória		
1996	Volta Redonda		
1997	Guarani		
1998	Avaí		
2002	Volta Redonda		
2003	Cabofriense		
2003	Volta Redonda		
2003–2004	Al Yarmouk		
2005	Volta Redonda		
- * Club domestic league appearances and goals

Humberto Mauro da Silva Teixeira or simply Humberto (born 10 December 1966) is a former Brazilian football striker.

== Career ==
Born in Volta Redonda, Humberto began playing football in the youth sides of Fluminense Football Club. He turned professional with his home town's Volta Redonda Futebol Clube, where he would become the club's all-time leading scorer with 61 goals.

In 1994, Humberto returned to Fluminense to play in the Campeonato Brasileiro Série A. He was red-carded on his debut, a 1–1 draw against Palmeiras. The following year, Humberto competed for Grêmio Foot-Ball Porto Alegrense in the Brasileiro.

At the end of his playing career, Humberto returned to Volta Redonda and won the 2005 Taça Guanabara. The club made a special tribute to their former player Humberto in 2013.
