= Humberto Barbosa =

Portuguese nutritionist (born 1961)

Doctor Humberto Barbosa
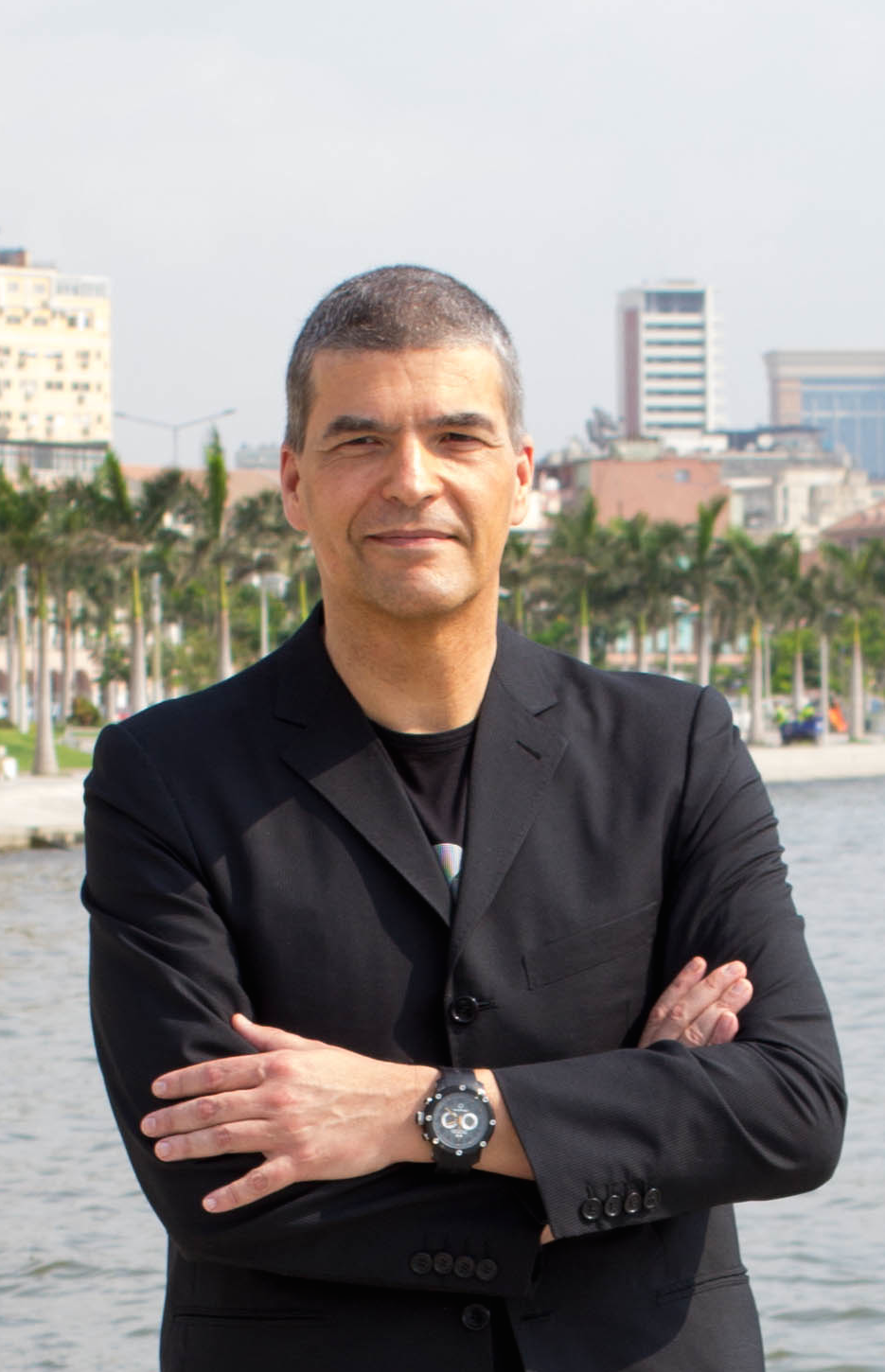
- Born: 8 August 1961 (age 63); Funchal, Madeira, Portugal
- Occupation: Nutritionist

Humberto Luís Rodrigues Barbosa (born 8 August 1961 in Funchal, Madeira) is a Portuguese nutritionist.

Barbosa completed his university education in England in 1983 when he obtained a PhD in nutrition.

In 1983, he submitted a scientific thesis in Psychology and Nutrition to the Academy of Sciences of Rome, and he was awarded a merit gold medal in Psycho-Biological Sciences.

In 1986, that thesis was published as a book in Portugal, as an author's Edition "Nutrition - The Science of Health" (Barbosa, Humberto - "Nutrition - The Science of Health". Lisbon: Nave, [D.L. 1988]. 123 p.).

In 1992, he founded a nutrition clinic in Parede, a municipality of Cascais, Portugal, where he introduced Orthomolecular Nutrition in 1977. In 1999, this clinic was franchised. Under Barbosa's clinical direction, other units were opened across Portugal, as well as a clinic in Spain (Madrid).

Barbosa created a method in nutritional psychology called "Consultation of Nutrition, Weight Control, Alimentary Re-education, and Revitalization," for which he obtained the Qualicert certificate, Certificate of Conformity No. 9332/38/61600/SO102. SGS ICS awarded this – International Certification Services in 2002. That was the first quality certification awarded in Portugal in this field.

In 2007, he published his second book, which is about Portuguese eating habits and the need for re-education about nutrition (ISBN 978-972-20-3294-0).

He regularly participates in radio and television shows, and contributes to several social media publications, such as VIP Magazine and Health and Wellness Magazine.

He currently maintains his clinical practice and research on nutrition and anti-aging treatments in Parede at his clinic "Clínica do Tempo."

== Selected publications ==
=== Books ===
- Barbosa, Humberto (2007). Portuguese eating habits and need for alimentary re-education. Livros d'Hoje. ISBN 978-972-20-3294-0.
- Barbosa, Humberto (1988). Nutrition - The Science of Health. Nave.
