= Humberto Garcia (writer) =

American writer

- Education: Florida International University; University of Illinois Urbana-Champaign
- Occupation: Writer

Humberto Garcia is an American writer. He is the Vincent Hillyer Chair Professor in the department of literatures and languages at the University of California, Merced.

In 2012, Garcia wrote the book Islam and the English Enlightenment 1670–1840, published by the Johns Hopkins University Press.
