= Humberto Luna =

American Spanish-language radio personality and TV host

Humberto Luna is a Spanish-language radio personality, TV host, and movie actor. He currently has a Spanish-language radio show broadcast throughout the United States called El Show de Humberto Luna.

== Biography ==
He now hosts an afternoon show on La Ranchera 96.7 FM in Los Angeles. Previously, Luna was the morning show host at LA PRIMERA 87.7 FM Radio Station (Las Vegas, NV). He is a veteran of the Los Angeles radio market with over 35 years of experience. He served as the lead morning show DJ at KTNQ-AM in Los Angeles, the flagship station of Heftel Broadcasting Corporation. From 1991 to 1995, he hosted the television show La Hora lunática.

Humberto Luna has a star on the Hollywood Walk of Fame.

== Sources ==
- Popular Spanish Personality Humberto Luna to Join Clear Channel Radio's La Preciosa Network, Business Wire, January 9, 2009
- Big City Radio, Inc. Announces Humberto Luna To HostMorning Show At Viva 107.1 Los Angeles, Business Wire, January 6, 2000
