= Humberto Soto (heavyweight boxer) =

Mexican boxer (born 1980)

Personal information
- Nickname: Big Toro
- Born: 21 January 1980 (age 46) Hermosillo, Sonora, Mexico
- Height: 1.84 m (6 ft 0 in)
- Weight: Heavyweight

Boxing career
- Reach: 192 cm (76 in)
- Stance: Orthodox

Boxing record
- Total fights: 12
- Wins: 10
- Win by KO: 9
- Losses: 2
- Draws: 0

Humberto Soto (born 21 January 1980) is a Mexican professional boxer who held the WBC FECOMBOX heavyweight title in 2008.

== Professional career ==
On 30 August 2008 Soto knocked out the veteran Carlos Sandoval to win the WBC FECOMBOX heavyweight title. This bout was held at the Expo Forum in Hermosillo, Sonora, Mexico.
