= Humberto Dávila Esquivel =

Mexican politician

- Born: 6 February 1939 (age 87); Coahuila, Mexico
- Died: 3 junio 2018; Saltillo Coahuila
- Other name: la liebre
- Occupation: Politician
- Political party: PANAL
- Spouse: Araceli Pader
- Children: 3

Humberto Dávila Esquivel (born 6 February 1939) is a Mexican politician from the New Alliance Party. From 2006 to 2009 he served as Deputy of the LX Legislature of the Mexican Congress representing Coahuila.
