= Humberto Rosa =

Humberto Rosa may refer to:

- Humberto Rosa (footballer) (1932–2017), Argentine football player and coach
- Humberto Rosa (painter) (1908–1948), Brazilian artist
