= Humberto Hernández (cyclist) =

Colombian cyclist (born 1971)

Humberto de Jesús Hernández Caro (born June 1, 1971) is a Colombian retired road cyclist from Risaralda, Caldas. He was nicknamed El Erizo ("the hedgehog") during his career.
