= Humberto Domingo Mayans =

Mexican politician

- Born: 6 February 1949 (age 77); Villahermosa, Tabasco, Mexico
- Education: UNAM
- Occupation: Senator
- Political party: PRI

Humberto Domingo Mayans Canabal (born 6 February 1949) is a Mexican politician affiliated with the Institutional Revolutionary Party. He currently serves as Senator of the LXII Legislature of the Mexican Congress representing Tabasco. He also served as Senator between 1994 and 2000 and as Deputy between 2000 and 2003.
