= Humberto Medina (dancer) =

Cuban dancer

Humberto Medina Pereira is a Cuban dancer. Sometimes called the Guarachero Mayor, he created Guaracheros de Regla in 1959. He and his newly created comparsa performed that year in Regla (June 5, 1959), but the following year they were invited to perform in Central Havana. As is the tradition for many dancers in Cuba, he started his dancing career as a youngster, choreographing Quinceañeras.

As leader of Guaracheros de Regla, he was recognized with a Premios Memoria Viva (Living Memorial Award) by El Consejo Nacional de Casas de Cultura (the Cuban National Council of Houses of Culture).
