= Humberto Macías Romero =

Mexican politician

- Born: 17 June 1985 (age 40); Tlaxcala, Mexico
- Occupation: Politician
- Political party: PAN

Humberto Agustín Macías Romero (born 17 June 1985) is a Mexican politician from the National Action Party. From 2010 to 2012 he served as Deputy of the LXI Legislature of the Mexican Congress representing Tlaxcala. From 2014 to 2016 he served as local congressman in Tlaxcala, and majority leader of the National Action Party
