= Ramón Fabié =

- Born: Ramón Fabié y de Jesús; 1785; Paco, Manila, Captaincy General of the Philippines, Spanish Empire
- Died: November 28, 1810 (aged 24–25); Guanajuato, Viceroyalty of New Spain, Spanish Empire
- Military career
- Allegiance: Mexico
- Branch: Mexican Insurgency
- Service years: 1810
- Rank: Lieutenant colonel
- Conflicts: Mexican War of Independence (Hidalgo revolt)

Ramón Fabié y de Jesús (1785 – November 28, 1810) was a Criollo (Insular) born in the Captaincy General of the Philippines, who became a Mexican mining engineering student and joined revolutionaries in the Mexican War of Independence.

== Background ==
Ramón Fabié was born in Paco, Manila. His parents were Brígida de Jesús and Pedro Crisólogo Fabié. The latter was a lawyer who worked in the Real Audiencia in Manila. After starting his studies in the Philippines, Fabie and his cousin Carlos went to New Spain to continue their studies. They entered the Royal College of Mines in Mexico City in 1802. One Fabie's mentors in college was Andrés Manuel del Río. Fabie was in Guanajuato City when Miguel Hidalgo y Costilla started the Cry of Dolores in 1810 which ignited the Mexican War of Independence.

Ramón Fabié decided to join the secessionists. He served as a lieutenant colonel under a regiment formed from workers of the Valenciana Mine which was led by colonel Casimiro Chowell. He participated in the fortification of Guanajuato City and manufactured arms and ammunition for the independence movement. Fabié was arrested by colonial authorities in his residence in Guanajuato City on November 25, 1810. He, along with Chowell, was executed by hanging in front of the Alhóndiga de Granaditas.

The Mexican embassy in Manila unveiled in 2021, a plaque commemorating Fabié's role in the Mexican War of Independence
