= Eduardo Galeano =

Uruguayan writer and journalist (1940–2015)

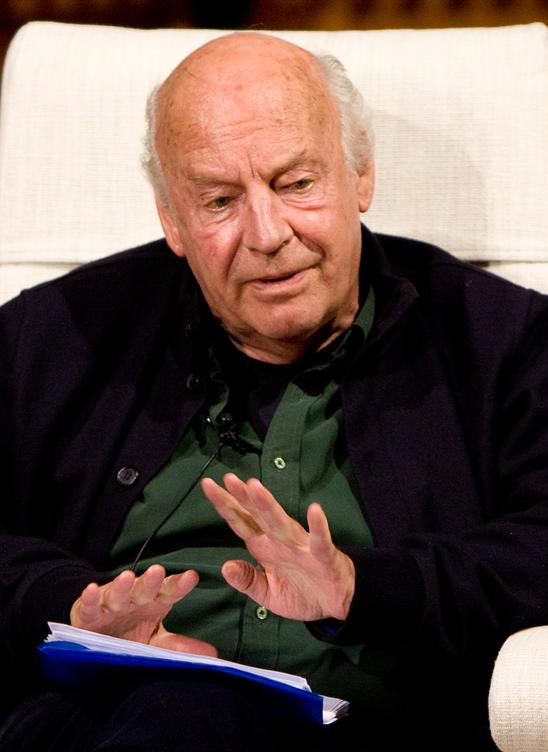
- Eduardo Galeano in 2012
- Born: Eduardo Germán María Hughes Galeano; 3 September 1940; Montevideo, Uruguay
- Died: 13 April 2015 (aged 74); Montevideo, Uruguay
- Occupations: Writer, journalist
- Spouse: Helena Villagra

Eduardo Germán María Hughes Galeano (Spanish: [eˈðwaɾðo ɣaleˈano]; 3 September 1940 – 13 April 2015) was a Uruguayan journalist, writer and novelist considered, among other things, "a literary giant of the Latin American left" and "global soccer's pre-eminent man of letters".

Galeano's best-known works are Las venas abiertas de América Latina (Open Veins of Latin America, 1971) and Memoria del fuego (Memory of Fire, 1982–6). "I'm a writer," the author once said of himself, "obsessed with remembering, with remembering the past of America and above all that of Latin America, intimate land condemned to amnesia."

Author Isabel Allende, who said her copy of Galeano's book was one of the few items with which she fled Chile in 1973 after the military coup of Augusto Pinochet, called Open Veins of Latin America "a mixture of meticulous detail, political conviction, poetic flair, and good storytelling."

== Life ==
Galeano was born in Montevideo, Uruguay, on 3 September 1940. He was the son of Eduardo Hughes Roosen, an official at the Ministry of Livestock, Agriculture, and Fisheries and owner of a ranch in the Paysandú Department, and Licia Esther Galeano Muñoz. He was of Welsh, Italian, German and Spanish descent.

Coming from a prominent Uruguayan family, he was a descendant, through his maternal line, of Fructuoso Rivera, the first president of Uruguay, and, through his paternal line, of Leandro Gómez, a military leader recognized for his defense of the city of Paysandú during its siege in 1864.

After completing two years of secondary school at Erwy School, Galeano went to work at age fourteen in various jobs, including messenger and fare collector. He eventually landed at El Sol. The Uruguayan socialist weekly first published the teenager's comics prior to his writing. Galeano's passion for drawing continued throughout his life; his vignettes can be seen in many of his later books while his signature was often accompanied by a small hand-drawn pig. As a journalist throughout the 1960s Galeano rose in prominence among leftist publications, and became editor of Marcha, an influential weekly with contributors such as Mario Vargas Llosa, Mario Benedetti, Manuel Maldonado Denis and Roberto Fernández Retamar. For two years he edited the daily Época and worked as editor-in-chief of the University Press. In 1959 he married his first wife, Silvia Brando, and in 1962, having divorced, he remarried to Graciela Berro. He wrote under his maternal family name; as a young man, he briefly wrote for a Uruguayan socialist publication, El Sol, signing articles as "Gius," "a pseudonym approximating the pronunciation in Spanish of his paternal surname Hughes."

In 1973, a military coup took power in Uruguay; Galeano was imprisoned and later was forced to flee, going into exile in Argentina where he founded the magazine Crisis. His 1971 book Open Veins of Latin America was banned by the right-wing military government, not only in Uruguay, but also in Chile and Argentina. In 1976 he married for the third time to Helena Villagra; however, in the same year, the Videla regime took power in Argentina in a bloody military coup and his name was added to the list of those condemned by the death squads. He fled again, this time to Spain, where he wrote his famous trilogy, Memoria del fuego (Memory of Fire), described as "the most powerful literary indictment of colonialism in the Americas."

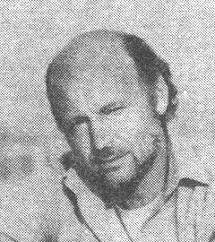
Galeano in 1984

At the beginning of 1985 Galeano returned to Montevideo when democratization occurred. Following the victory of Tabaré Vázquez and the Broad Front alliance in the 2004 Uruguayan elections marking the first left-wing government in Uruguayan history Galeano wrote a piece for The Progressive titled "Where the People Voted Against Fear" in which Galeano showed support for the new government and concluded that the Uruguayan populace used "common sense" and were "tired of being cheated" by the traditional Colorado and Blanco parties. Following the creation of TeleSUR, a Latin American television station based in Caracas, Venezuela, in 2005 Galeano along with other left-wing intellectuals such as Tariq Ali and Adolfo Pérez Esquivel joined the network's 36 member advisory committee.

On 10 February 2007, Galeano underwent a successful operation to treat lung cancer. During an interview with journalist Amy Goodman following Barack Obama's election as President of the United States in November 2008, Galeano said: "The White House will be Barack Obama's house in the time coming, but this White House was built by black slaves. And I'd like, I hope, that he never, never forgets this." At the 17 April 2009 opening session of the 5th Summit of the Americas held in Port of Spain, Trinidad and Tobago, Venezuelan President Hugo Chávez gave a Spanish-language copy of Galeano's Open Veins of Latin America to U.S. President Barack Obama, who was making his first diplomatic visit to the region.

In a May 2009 interview he spoke about his past and recent works, some of which deal with the relationships between freedom and slavery, and democracies and dictatorships: "not only the United States, also some European countries, have spread military dictatorships all over the world. And they feel as if they are able to teach democracy". He also talked about how and why he has changed his writing style, and his recent rise in popularity.

In April 2014 Galeano gave an interview at the II Bienal Brasil do Livro e da Leitura in which he regretted some aspects of the writing style in Las Venas Abiertas de América Latina, saying

"Time has passed, I've begun to try other things, to bring myself closer to human reality in general and to political economy specifically. 'The Open Veins' tried to be a political economy book, but I simply didn't have the necessary education. I do not regret writing it, but it is a stage that I have since passed."

This interview was picked up by many critics of Galeano's work in which they used the statement to reinforce their own criticisms. However, in an interview with Jorge Majfud he said,

"The book, written ages ago, is still alive and kicking. I am simply honest enough to admit that at this point in my life the old writing style seems rather stodgy, and that it's hard for me to recognize myself in it since I now prefer to be increasingly brief and untrammeled. [The] voices that have been raised against me and against The Open Veins of Latin America are seriously ill with bad faith."

== Work ==
Las venas abiertas de América Latina (Open Veins of Latin America), a history of the region from the time of Columbus from the perspective of the subjugated people, is considered one of Galeano's best-known works. An English-language translation by Cedric Belfrage gained some popularity in the English-speaking world after Venezuelan President Hugo Chávez gave it as a gift to U.S. President Barack Obama in 2009. Decades after its first publication, Galeano disavowed certain aspects of the book while still upholding many ideas embodied in it.

Galeano was also a fan of football, writing most notably about it in Football in Sun and Shadow (El fútbol a sol y sombra). In a retrospective for SB Nation after Galeano's death, football writer Andi Thomas described the work—a history of the sport, as well as an outlet for the author's own experiences with the sport and his political polemics—as "one of the greatest books about football ever written".

== Death ==
Galeano died on 13 April 2015 in Montevideo from lung cancer at the age of 74, survived by third wife Helena Villagra and three children.

== Awards and honors ==
- 2006: International Human Rights Award by Global Exchange
- 2010: Stig Dagerman Prize
- 2021: Posthumous "honoris causa" prize from the National University of Misiones.
- ???: Order of Ruben Darío

== Works ==
=== Books ===
Year	Spanish title	Spanish ISBN	Spanish Publisher	English translation
1963	Los días siguientes		Alfa	The Following Days
1964	China			
1967	Guatemala, país ocupado			Guatemala: Occupied Country (1969)
1967	Reportajes			
1967	Los fantasmas del día del león y otros relatos			
1968	Su majestad el fútbol			
1971	Las venas abiertas de América Latina	ISBN 950-895-094-3	Siglo XXI	Open Veins of Latin America (1973) ISBN 0-85345-279-2
1971	Siete imágenes de Bolivia			
1971	Violencia y enajenación			
1972	Crónicas latinoamericanas			
1973	Vagamundo	ISBN 84-7222-307-8		
1980	La canción de nosotros	ISBN 84-350-0124-5		
1977	Conversaciones con Raimón	ISBN 84-7432-034-8		
1978	Días y noches de amor y de guerra	ISBN 84-7222-891-6	Del Chanchito	Days and Nights of Love and War ISBN 0-85345-620-8
1980	La piedra arde			
1981	Voces de nuestro tiempo	ISBN 84-8360-237-7		
1982–1986	Memoria del fuego	ISBN 9974-620-05-8	Del Chanchito	Memory of fire: Volume I: Eduardo Galeano (29 April 2014). Genesis. Open Road Media. ISBN 978-1-4804-8138-1. Volume II: Faces and Masks. ISBN 978-0-393-31806-7. Volume III: Century of the Wind. ISBN 0-393-31807-9.
1984	Aventuras de los jóvenes dioses	ISBN 968-23-2094-1	Siglo XXI	
1985	Ventana sobre Sandino			
1985	Contraseña			
1986	La encrucijada de la biodiversidad colombiana			
1986	El descubrimiento de América que todavía no fue y otros escritos	ISBN 84-7668-105-4	Editorial Laia	
1988–2002	El tigre azul y otros artículos	ISBN 959-06-0211-8	Ciencias Sociales (Cuba)	
1962–1987	Entrevistas y artículos		Ediciones Del Chanchito	
1989	El libro de los abrazos	ISBN 978-84-323-0690-7	Siglo XXI	The Book of Embraces ISBN 0-393-02960-3
1989	Nosotros decimos no	ISBN 84-323-0675-4	Siglo XXI	
1990	América Latina para entenderte mejor			
1990	Palabras: antología personal			
1992	Ser como ellos y otros artículos	ISBN 978-84-323-0761-4	Siglo XXI	
1993	Amares	ISBN 84-206-3419-0	Alianza, España	
1993	Las palabras andantes	ISBN 9974-620-08-2	Del Chanchito	
1994	Úselo y tírelo	ISBN 950-742-851-8	Editorial Planeta	
1995	El fútbol a sol y sombra	ISBN 978-84-323-1134-5	Siglo XXI	Football (soccer) in Sun and Shadow ISBN 1-85984-848-6
1998	Patas arriba: Escuela del mundo al revés	ISBN 9974-620-14-7	Macchi	Upside Down: A Primer for the Looking-Glass World 2000, ISBN 0-8050-6375-7
1999	Carta al ciudadano 6.000 millones	ISBN 84-406-9472-5	Ediciones B	
2001	Tejidos. Antología	ISBN 84-8063-500-2	Ediciones Octaedro	
2004	Bocas del tiempo	ISBN 978-950-895-160-1	Catálogos Editora	Voices of time: a life in stories ISBN 978-0-8050-7767-4
2006	El viaje	ISBN 84-96592-55-3		
2007	Carta al señor futuro			
2008	Patas Arriba: La escuela del mundo del revés	ISBN 950-895-050-1	Catálogos Editora	
2008	Espejos	ISBN 978-987-1492-00-8	Siglo XXI	Mirrors: Stories of Almost Everyone 2009, ISBN 1-56858-423-7
2008	La resurrección del Papagayo	ISBN 978-84-92412-22-8	Libros del Zorro Rojo	
2011	Los hijos de los días	ISBN 978-987-629-200-9	Siglo XXI	Children of the Days: A Calendar of Human History ISBN 978-1-56858-747-9
2015	Mujeres – antología	ISBN 978-84-323-1768-2	Siglo XXI	
2016	El cazador de historias	ISBN 978-987-629-628-1	Siglo XXI	Hunter of Stories 2017, ISBN 978-1-56858-990-9
2017	Cerrado por fútbol		Siglo XXI	

=== Articles ===
- "The noose". New Left Review. II (17). September–October 2002.
- "Nothingland—or Venezuela?". New Left Review. II (29). September–October 2004.

== See also ==
- Culture of Uruguay
- List of Uruguayan writers
- Z Communications
