= Ferreiro =

Ferreiro is a surname of Galician-Portuguese origin, equivalent to English Smith. Notable people with the surname include:

- Alfredo Mario Ferreiro (1899–1959), Uruguayan poet
- Celso Emilio Ferreiro (1912–1979), Spanish writer and politician
- David Ferreiro (born 1988), Spanish professional footballer
- Dora Ferreiro (1916–2011), Argentine film actress
- Emilia Ferreiro (1937–2023), Argentine pedagogue, psychologist, and writer
- Franco Ferreiro (born 1984), Brazilian retired tennis player
- Iván Ferreiro (born 1970), Spanish singer
- Mario Aníbal Ferreiro (born 1959), Paraguayan television host and politician
- Martín Ferreiro (born 1997), Argentine field hockey player
- Roberto Ferreiro (1935–2017), Argentine professional footballer
