= Days of War, Nights of Love =

Days of War, Nights of Love may refer to:

- Days and Nights of Love and War, a 1978 book by Eduardo Galeano
- Days of War, Nights of Love (book), a collection of political, social, and philosophical essays published by CrimethInc. in 2000
- Days of War, Nights of Love (album), the original title of what became the 2009 rock album Metamorphosis by Papa Roach
