= Armentano =

Armentano is an Italian surname. Notable people with the surname include:

- Amedeo Rocco Armentano (1886–1966), Italian esotericist
- Anthony J. Armentano (1916–1987), American politician
- Mariano Armentano (born 1974), Argentine soccer player
- Paul Armentano, American cannabis activist
- Ricardo Armentano (born 1957), Uruguayan professor and researcher
