= Hugo Alfaro =

Uruguayan journalist, intellectual and film critic

Hugo Alfaro (Tala, Uruguay, 20 February 1917 – Montevideo, 16 March 1996) was a Uruguayan journalist, intellectual and film critic.

In his youth he contributed to the famous weekly newspaper Marcha. Later, in 1985, he was the main founder of the newspaper Brecha.

== Works ==
- Mi mundo tal cual es (Ed. Marcha. 1966)
- Ver para creer
- Reportajes a la realidad
- Navegar es necesario. Quijano y el semanario Marcha (Ediciones de la Banda Oriental. 1984)
- Mario Benedetti: detrás de un vidrio claro (Trilce. 1986)
- Pruebas de imprenta
- Por la vereda del sol (Ed. de Brecha. 1994)
