= María Esther Gilio =

- Born: 1922; Montevideo, Uruguay
- Died: 27 August 2011 (aged 89); Montevideo, Uruguay
- Occupations: Journalist; writer; lawyer
- Spouse: Darío Queigeiro
- Children: Carmen, Isabel
- Awards: Casa de las Américas Prize (1970)

María Esther Gilio (1922 – 27 August 2011) was a Uruguayan journalist, writer, biographer, and lawyer, distinguished for her contributions to newspapers of Uruguay and Argentina. She also wrote for publications in Brazil, Mexico, Spain, France, Italy, Chile, and Venezuela.

== Biography ==
María Esther Gilio became a lawyer in 1957 and began working as a journalist in 1966 at the weekly Marcha, subsequently joining Brecha, Revista Plural, Tiempo Argentino, Crisis, La Opinión, El País, La Nación, Clarín, and Página/12.

She produced valuable interviews with relevant figures of the River Plate region and international culture, such as Jorge Luis Borges, Aníbal Troilo, Juan Carlos Onetti, Mario Vargas Llosa, Gonzalo Fonseca, José Saramago, Mario Benedetti, Vittorio Gassman, Augusto Roa Bastos, China Zorrilla, Adolfo Bioy Casares, José Donoso, Fernando Vallejo, Noam Chomsky, Abelardo Castillo, and Luis Pérez Aguirre.

She lived in exile in Paris in 1972, in Argentina from 1973 to 1976 and 1978 to 1985, and in Brazil from 1976 to 1978. In 1990 she again took up residence in Montevideo.

Her interviews were part of Onetti's biography Construcción de la noche: La vida de Juan Carlos Onetti (Buenos Aires: Planeta, 1993). In 1993 Conversaciones con María Esther Gilio was published, and in 2008 she joined the roster of Diálogos con la cultura uruguaya (published by El País).

== Select publications ==
- La guerrilla tupamara, 1970 (Casa de las Américas Prize)
- Personas y personajes, 1973
- Diálogo con Wilson Ferreira Aldunate, 1984
- Construcción en la noche: la vida de Juan Carlos Onetti, 1993
- Terra da felicidade, 1997
- El cholo González, un cañero de Bella Unión, 2004
- Pepe Mujica: de Tupamaro a ministro, 2005
- Aurelio el fotógrafo o la pasión de vivir, 2006
