= Brecha (newspaper) =

Weekly newspaper

- Type: Weekly newspaper
- Format: Tabloid
- Founder: Hugo Alfaro
- Founded: 1985
- Political alignment: Independent left
- Language: Spanish
- Headquarters: Montevideo, Uruguay
- Website: http://www.brecha.com.uy

Brecha is a Uruguayan left-leaning weekly newspaper.

== History ==
Founded in 1985 by Hugo Alfaro and other journalists that had started their careers at Marcha under the influence of Carlos Quijano. As Quijano had died in 1984 in exile, they decided to take a new name, and try to continue with the original idea: an independent leftist weekly newspaper. Its pages display the work of Hugo Alfaro, Mario Benedetti, Oscar Bruschera, Guillermo Chifflet, Eduardo Galeano, Ernesto González Bermejo, Carlos María Gutiérrez, Carlos Núñez, Héctor Rodríguez, José Wainer, Guillermo Waksman, Coriún Aharonian and Gabriel Peluffo.

Together with Búsqueda, it is considered one of the two most influential political weekly newspapers in Uruguay.

== Bibliography ==
- Arndt, Renate (1993). "Die Rolle der Presse im uruguayischen Regimewechselprozeß". In Bodemer, Klaus; Licio, Marta; Nolte, Detlef (eds.). Uruguay zwischen Tradition und Wandel (in German). Institut für Iberoamerika-Kunde. pp. 189, 209.
