= Leandro Gómez =

Uruguayan politician (1811–1865)

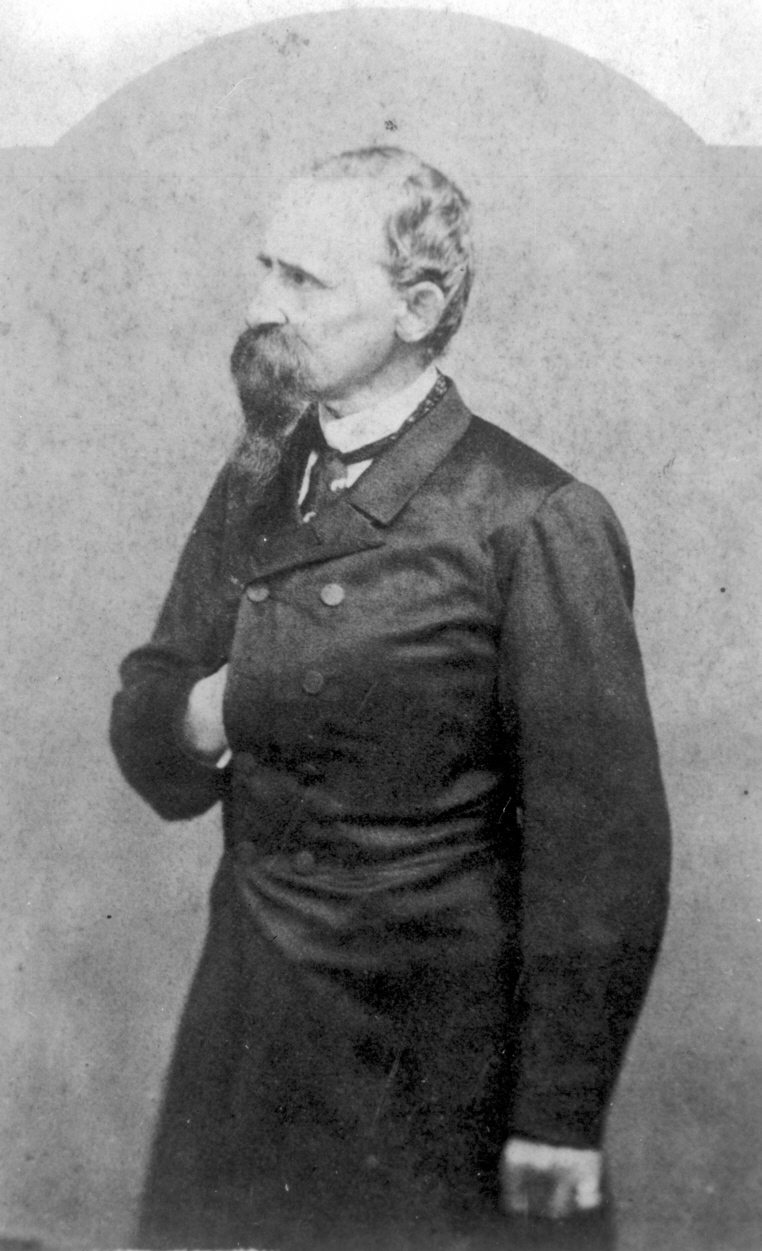
- Born: José María Leandro Gómez Calvo; 13 March 1811; Montevideo, Viceroyalty of the Río de la Plata, Spanish Empire
- Died: 2 January 1865 (aged 53); Paysandú, Uruguay
- Political party: National Party

José María Leandro Gómez Calvo, better known as Leandro Gómez (13 March 1811 – 2 January 1865) was a Uruguayan military officer and politician. A member of the National Party, he is best remembered for his heroical defense during the Siege of Paysandú in 1864.

The Route 26 is named after him.

== Bibliography ==
- Maia, Prado (1975). A Marinha de Guerra do Brasil na Colônia e no Império (in Portuguese) (2 ed.). Rio de Janeiro: Cátedra.
- Schneider, Louis (2009). A Guerra da Tríplice Aliança Contra o Paraguai (in Portuguese). Porto Alegre: Pradense. ISBN 978-85-89072-13-7.
- Tasso Fragoso, Augusto (2009). História da Guerra entre a Tríplice Aliança e o Paraguai (in Portuguese). Vol. 1 (3 ed.). Rio de Janeiro: Biblioteca do Exército.
