= National Technological University – Buenos Aires Regional Faculty =

Coordinates: 34.5978°S 58.4207°W

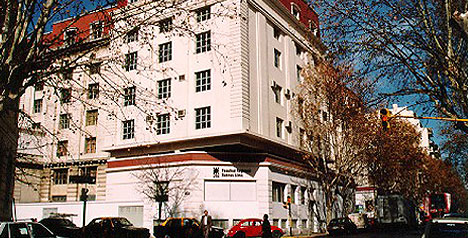
The FRBA's main building in Almagro

The National Technological University, Buenos Aires (Spanish: Universidad Tecnológica Nacional - Facultad Regional Buenos Aires), also called UTN-FRBA or UTN.BA, is the Buenos Aires–based regional faculty of the National Technological University.

It is the largest engineering college in Argentina and one of the most prestigious in the country.

In 2016 and 2019, the UTN.BA received the National Quality Award in the public sector, being the first public Faculty to receive this award, for its excellence in management models.

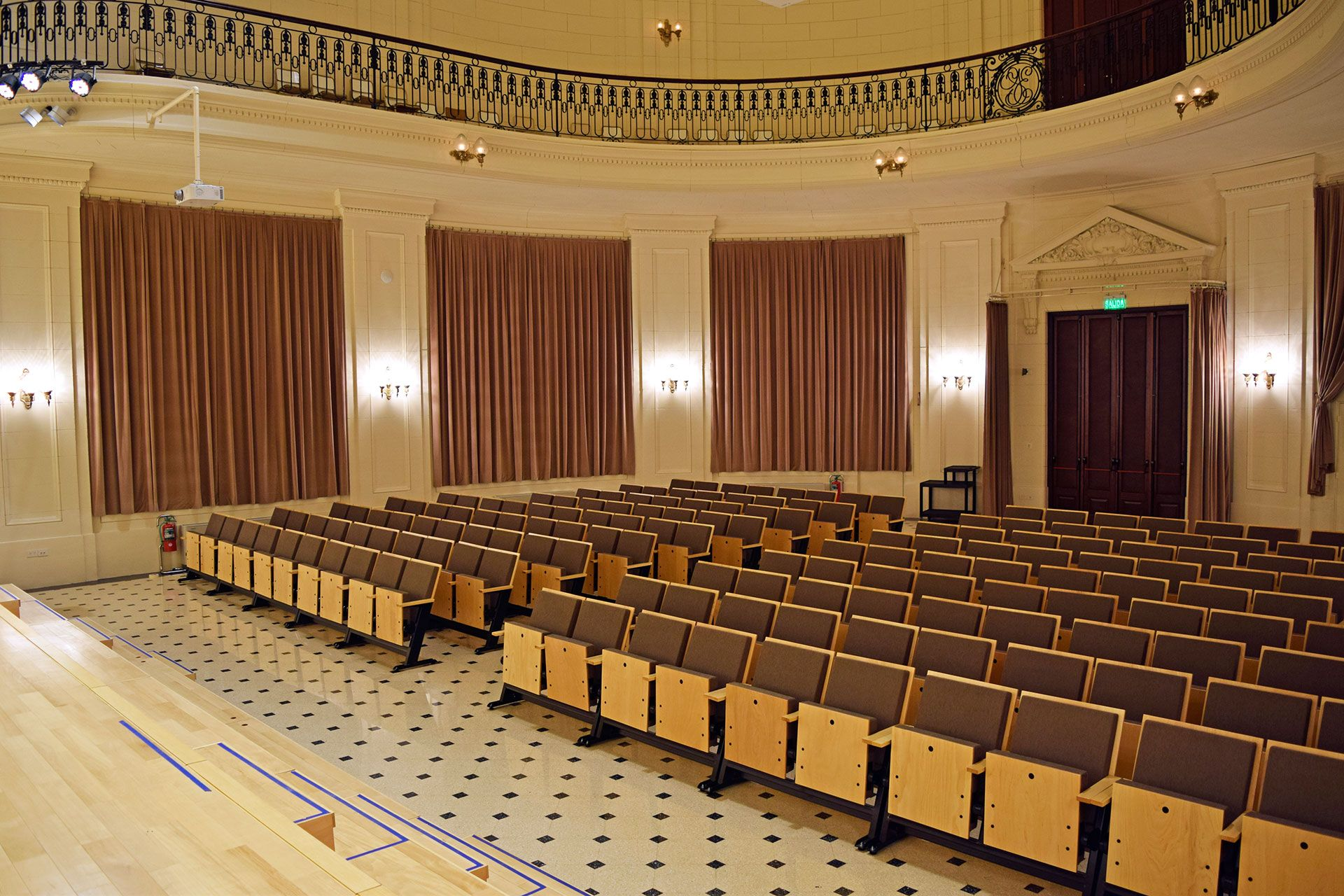
Lecture hall

The college includes a main building and a postgraduate school in Almagro and a campus in Villa Lugano, both neighborhoods of Buenos Aires.

== Programs ==
=== Engineering degrees ===
This college offers the following engineering degrees:

- Engineer's degree in civil engineering
- Engineer's degree in textile engineering
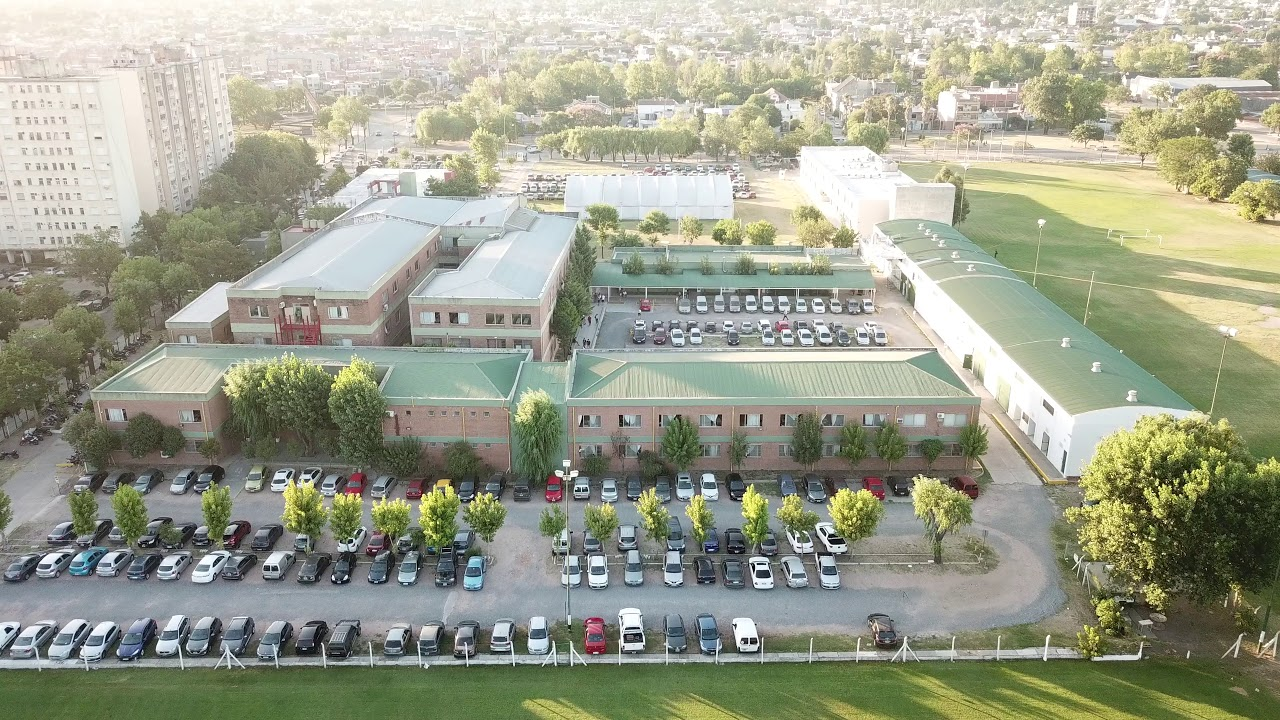
- Campus headquarters
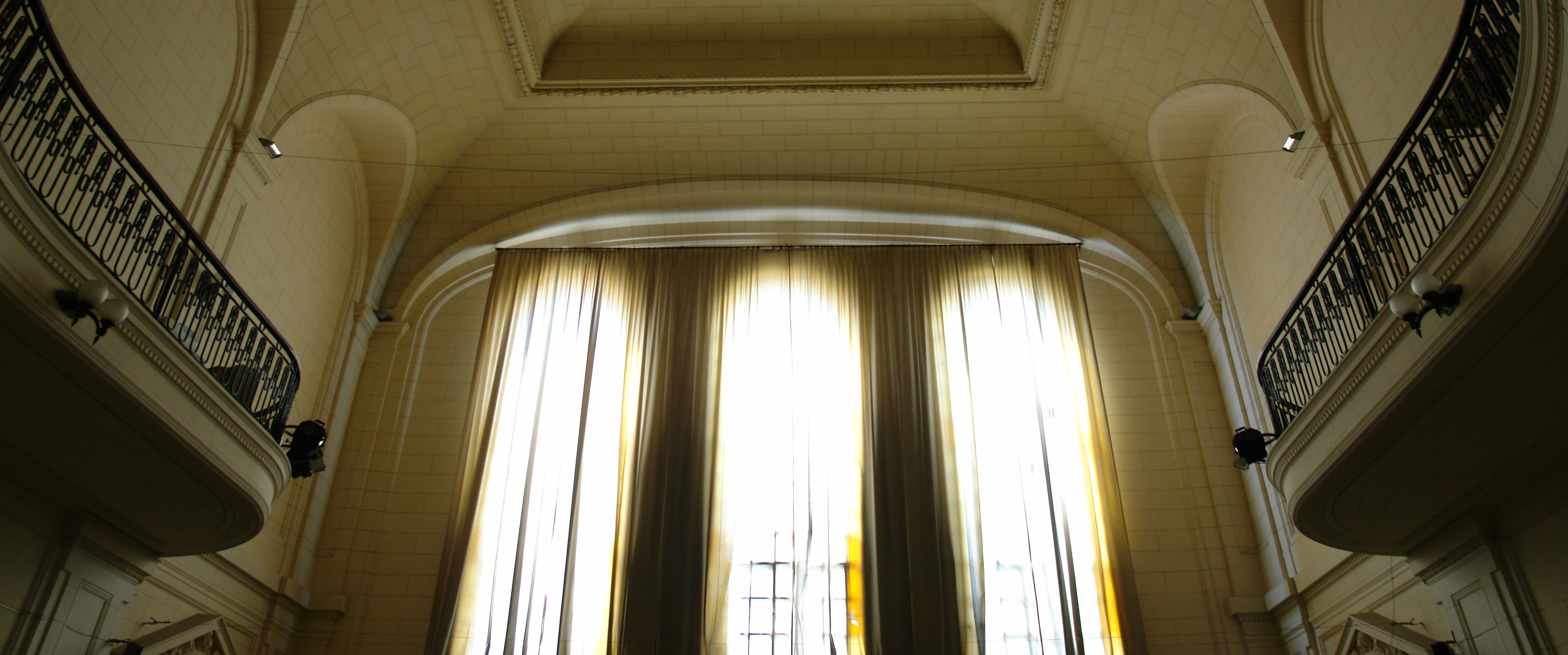
  Dome in conference room
  Engineer's degree in naval engineering
- Engineer's degree in mechanical engineering
- Engineer's degree in information systems engineering (with an optional intermediate developer's degree in information systems)
- Engineer's degree in industrial engineering
- Engineer's degree in electric engineering
- Engineer's degree in electronic engineering (with an optional intermediate technician's degree in electronics)
- Engineer's degree in chemical engineering (with an optional intermediate technician's degree in chemistry)

=== Postgraduate degrees ===
- Master's
  - Master's degree in business administration
  - Master's degree in university education
  - Master's degree in quality engineering
  - Master's degree in engineering information systems
  - Master's degree in ambiental engineering
  - Master's degree in biotechnological processes
  - Master's degree in food technology
  - Master's degree in structural engineering
- Specializations
  - Specialization in management engineering
  - Specialization in university education
  - Specialization in quality engineering
  - Specialization in engineering information systems
  - Specialization in ambiental engineering
  - Specialization in laboural engineering
  - Specialization in food technology
  - Specialization in work hygiene and safety
  - Specialization in telecommunications engineering
- PhD in engineering (signals and image processing)

== Departments ==
- Department of Basic Sciences
- Department of Civil Engineering
- Department of Electrical Engineering
- Department of Electronic Engineering
- Department of Industrial Engineering
- Department of Mechanical Engineering
- Department of Naval Engineering
- Department of Chemical Engineering
- Department of Information Systems Engineering
- Department of Textil Engineering

== Research Groups ==
=== GIBIO — Group for R&D in Bioengineering (Spanish: Grupo de Investigación y Desarrollo en Bioingeniería) ===
Director: Dr. Ricardo Armentano | Coordinator: Dr. Leandro Cymberknop

The GIBIO is a multidisciplinary research group involving physicists, bioengineers, doctors and engineers of various disciplines. Also it consists of students, undergraduate and graduate scholars, and researchers mostly from the UTN.BA. The group functions in the field of bioengineering, especially within the branch of "Cardiovascular Engineering". It is located in the Main Building (Medrano 951, CABA) of the Buenos Aires Regional Faculty of National Technological University and depends on the Secretariat of Science, Technology and Productive Innovation (Spanish: Secretaría de Ciencia, Tecnología e Innovación Productiva, SeCTIP). The main objective of GIBIO is the study, research, development and evaluation of methods and equipment for the diagnosis and prevention, mostly of cardiovascular diseases, from its primitive genesis. Also GIBIO collaborates with several reputed international research entities to perform an intensive interdisciplinary research in the field of bioengineering.

Among its current lines of research and development, the key fields are bioinstrumentation, biomedical prototypes development, biomechanical studies of synthetic and biological prosthetics, computational numerical simulation, signal processing, medical image and data processing, big data analytics and internet of things applied to monitoring of cardiometabolic diseases.

== History ==
This UTN.BA is one of the 24 regional faculties of the National Technological University of Argentina.

- Buenos Aires Regional Faculty (FRBA) Official website
