= Salvador Bécquer Puig =

Uruguayan poet and journalist

Salvador Bécquer Puig (1939–2009) was a Uruguayan poet and journalist.

== Biography ==
He was born in Montevideo, Uruguay on January 9, 1939.

Between 1967 and 1968, he worked as a literary critic for the famous weekly newspaper Marcha. From 1976 to 1982, he worked as a correspondent for Reuters and from 1982 to 2004 for ANSA . He also worked in radio station CX 30 hosting journalistic programs.

In 1987, he participated in the Congress of Iberoamerican writers held in Israel.

As a poet, he received several honors, among them, the Bartolome Hidalgo Award in 1993 for his book “Si tuviera que apostar” (If I had to bet), and the Juan José Morosoli Award in 2000 for his literary work. In 2001, he received the first prize in Poetry awarded by the Ministry of Education and Culture for his book “Falso Testimonio” (False Testimony).

He died on March 3, 2009, at the age of 70.

== Bibliography ==
- La luz entre nosotros (Alfa. 1963)
- Apalabrar (Arca. 1980, prólogo de Eduardo Milán)
- Lugar a dudas (Arca. 1984)
- Si tuviera que apostar (1992)
- Por así decirlo (Cal y Canto. 2000)
- En un lugar o en otro (Cal y Canto. 2003)
- Escritorio (2006)
