= Guillermo Chifflet =

Uruguayan journalist (1926–2020)

Guillermo Chifflet Zerboni
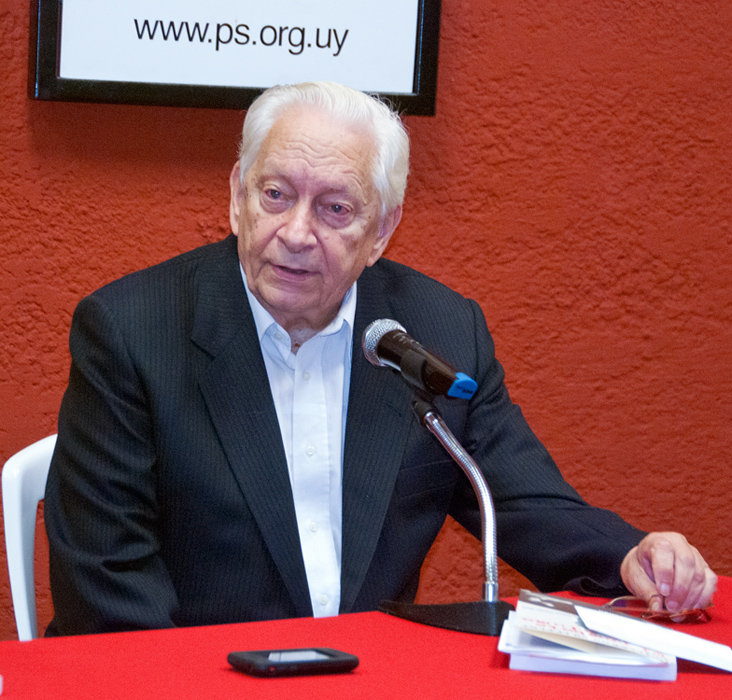
- Guillermo Chifflet during the presentation of a book written about him, 2011

National Representative
- In office 3 March 1989 – 2 December 2005
- Constituency: Montevideo

Personal details
- Born: 26 September 1926 Montevideo, Uruguay
- Died: 26 April 2020 (aged 93) Montevideo, Uruguay
- Political party: Broad Front; Socialist Party
- Spouse: Julia Amoretti (m. 1967; died 2020)
- Children: Michelle and Amelie
- Occupation: Politician, writer, and journalist

Guillermo Chifflet (26 September 1926 – 26 April 2020) was a Uruguayan politician, writer, and journalist who served as a Representative and co-founded the Broad Front.

== Biography ==
Guillermo Chifflet Zerboni was born on September 15, 1926 in Montevideo, Uruguay. His father, Enrique Chifflet, was a dentist.

Chifflet married Julia Amoretti, a Uruguayan radio, television, and theater actress, on December 21, 1967; he was 41 years old and she was 32 years old. They had two daughters, Michelle and Amelie.

== Career ==
As a journalist, Guillermo Chifflet worked at the Uruguayan newspapers Época and Hechos, and the weeklies Marcha, Brecha, and El Sol (of which he was Editor in Chief).

Guillermo Chifflet was one of the founders of the Broad Front in 1971. He was first elected to Chamber of Representatives in 1989, as a member of the Socialist Party. He was subsequently re-elected in 1994, 1999 and 2004. In December 2005, he resigned from his seat as a representative after legislators of the ruling Broad Front party voted to keep Uruguayan troops in the United Nations Stabilisation Mission in Haiti (MINUSTAH).
