= Days and Nights of Love and War =

- First edition
- Author: Eduardo Galeano
- Original title: Días y Noches de Amor y de Guerra
- Translator: Judith Brister
- Language: Spanish
- Publisher: Casa de las Américas
- Publication date: 1978
- Publication place: Cuba
- English publication date: 1982
- ISBN: 959-04-0017-5
- OCLC: 6814530

Days and Nights of Love and War (Spanish: Días y Noches de Amor y de Guerra) is a 1978 book by Uruguayan writer Eduardo Galeano. An English translation was published in 1982 by Monthly Review Press. Structured as a series of fragments, the book varies in tone from straight journalism to expressionism and poetic lyricism and in genre from short story to aphorism to biography. It established the formal and thematic qualities of Galeano's prose, and won the Casa de las Américas Prize in 1978.

== Origins and focus ==
The book grew out of the repression Uruguay suffered under dictatorial rule in the 1970s, during Galeano's 11-year exile from the country. It chronicles two decades of struggle and perseverance in Latin America, with the 1976 Argentine coup d'état as its focal point. Galeano reveals episodes of his early life such as his surviving malaria, his loss of faith in God, the threats of military coups, dictators and censorship, as well as his experiences living amongst Indians, guerrillas, presidents and prostitutes. He defends his compatriots as well as Brazilian street children, the embattled indigenous Mexicans in Chiapas, and the continent's millions of abandoned children.

== Impact ==
Days and Nights of Love and War was a transitional book between Galeano's earlier journalistic work and his later more literary output; it was the first of a series of works (culminating in his Memory of Fire trilogy) which established his reputation as a writer.

It inspired the anarchist collective CrimethInc.'s 2001 manifesto Days of War, Nights of Love, which shares its mixed form, aphoristic style and embrace of philosophy and morality as weapons within a political superstructure.
