= Open Veins of Latin America =

1971 book by Eduardo Galeano

Open Veins of Latin America: Five Centuries of the Pillage of a Continent
- Author: Eduardo Galeano
- Original title: Las venas abiertas de América Latina
- Translator: Cedric Belfrage
- Language: Spanish
- Subject: History of Latin America
- Publisher: Monthly Review Press
- Publication date: 1971
- Publication place: Uruguay
- English publication date: 1973 (1st edition); 1997 (25th anniv. edition)
- Media type: Print
- Pages: xiii, 317 p.
- ISBN: 978-0-85345-990-3
- OCLC: 37820142
- Dewey Decimal: 330.98 21
- LC Class: HC125 .G25313 1997

Open Veins of Latin America: Five Centuries of the Pillage of a Continent (Spanish: Las venas abiertas de América Latina) is a 1971 book written by Uruguayan journalist, writer, and poet Eduardo Galeano that analyzes the impacts of European settlement, imperialism, and slavery on Latin America.

The book was published during the ideological divide caused by the Cold War, when most Latin American countries had brutal, United States-sponsored right-wing dictatorships. Open Veins was banned in several countries and became a reference for an entire generation of left-wing thinkers.

In the book, Galeano analyzes the history of the Americas as a whole, from the time period of the European settlement of the New World to contemporary Latin America, describing the effects of European and later United States economic exploitation and political dominance over the region. Throughout the book, Galeano analyses notions of colonialism, imperialism, and the dependency theory.

Open Veins illustrates Latin America's resistance literature of the twentieth century, characterized by opposition to imperialism and a heightened Pan-American sentiment. The book has sold over a million copies and been translated into over a dozen languages. It has been included in university courses "ranging from history and anthropology to economics and geography."

== Background ==
Before gaining international recognition for Open Veins of Latin America, Galeano was a commentator on social and political issues, journalist, novelist, essayist, historian, and also a writer of children’s literature.

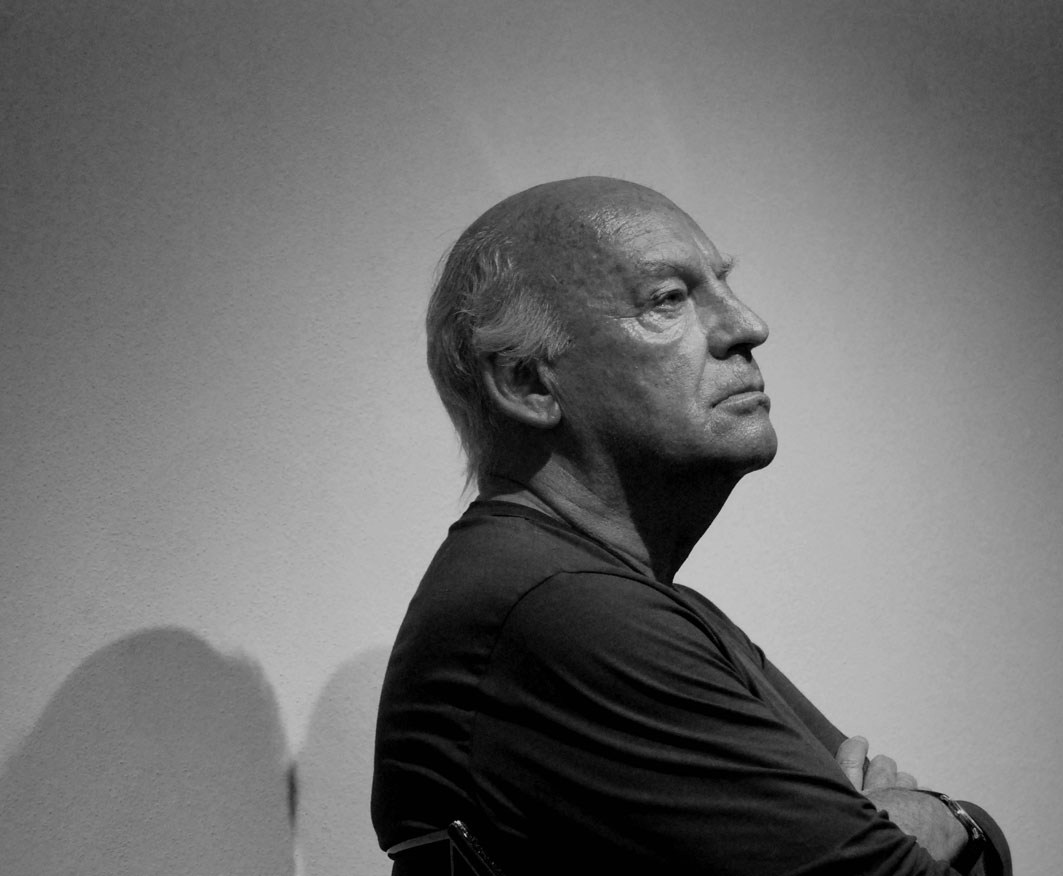
Eduardo Galeano during a conference at the Librarsi bookshop in Vicenza, Italy.

His work encompasses a wide array of literary genres, including journalism, political analysis, documentaries, fiction, and history. When questioned about the latter, Galeano stated that he does not identify as a historian. "I am a writer who would like to contribute to the rescue of the kidnapped memory of all America,” Galeano defended, “but especially of Latin America, a despised and endearing land."

Galeano wrote Open Veins of Latin America in the context of the 1970s, when right-wing, US-sponsored dictatorships were ruling in the majority of Latin American countries. At the time, Galeano was working in Uruguay as an independent journalist and editor, and in the publishing department of the University of the Republic. He said, "It took four years of researching and collecting the information I needed, and some 90 nights to write the book".

=== Historical context ===
The publication of Open Veins in 1971 arrived amid a fast process of militarization that had deep consequences in Latin America between the 1960s and 1970s. This period in Latin America’s history continues to influence the political, social, and economic transformations the region has experienced in the last five decades.

Such a process of militarization manifested in the shape of military coups, which were commonplace in the region during the 1960s. Although some Latin American countries, such as Argentina and Brazil, previously had complex histories of military dictatorships, this time period was characterized by regional integration and an expansive character of repression. Latin American dictatorships were aligned under the anti-Soviet, anti-communist National Security doctrine promoted by the United States during the Cold War.

The integration of Latin America’s military dictatorships occurred through international programs, such as Operation Condor, that sought to eradicate from the region all influences from the left, communism, and revolutionary utopianism. This integration led to widespread violence and repression, and a massive effort to “destroy, torture, and make disappear” the ideological left from Latin American politics.

== Summary ==
=== Structure ===
Open Veins of Latin America has a foreword written by Chilean writer Isabel Allende, followed by a preface by Galeano titled "In Defense of the Word" and a series of acknowledgments. The book has an introduction titled "120 Million Children in the Eye of the Hurricane", and it is then divided into three parts: "Part I: Mankind's poverty as a consequence of the wealth of the land"; "Part II: Development is a voyage with more shipwrecks than navigators"; and "Part III: Seven Years After".

Each of the first two parts has subcategories. Part I is divided into "Lust for Gold, Lust for Silver", "King Sugar and Other Agricultural Monarchs", and "The Invisible Sources of Power". Part II is divided into "Tales of Premature Death" and "The Contemporary Structure of Plunder". Lastly, Part III is considered to be the conclusion of the book, and it was written seven years later and annexed to future editions.

=== Summary ===
In the book, Galeano discusses topics such as the exploitation of natural resources, poverty in Latin America, and the "exportation" of wealth to Europe. He argues that the transfer of such wealth solidified capitalism and, consequently, the development of Europe and the United States.

The book also discusses the progress indigenous communities had achieved by the time the colonizers arrived and seeks to explain why the West, which Galeano refers to as the "North", is developed whereas the Global South remains underdeveloped. Galeano also criticizes the corruption of the "creole oligarchy", which refers to the political system in which the distribution of power is concentrated among a few people, often belonging to privileged families from the colonial period. Galeano claims that Latin America's oligarchy is controlled by foreign powers and has contributed to perpetuating the exploitation of the region.

Open Veins begins with the time of European settlement of the Americas. Galeano narrates how the men of Spanish Conquistador Hernán Cortés destroyed the city of Tenochtitlan, capital of the Mexica Empire, and how Spanish Conquistador Francisco Pizarro, after receiving a ransom equivalent to two rooms filled with gold and silver to free Inca emperor Atahualpa, still decided to kill him. Galeano also discusses how the sugar cane brought by the Spaniards destroyed the ecological landscape of considerable areas of Brazil and the Caribbean. As a whole, Part I of the book focuses on Latin America's natural resources and how their exploitation generated wealth for the Europeans while exacerbating poverty for Latin Americans. In this section Galeano also emphasizes the suffering European settlement meant for indigenous communities, who were dispossessed of their land, enslaved, and killed.

In Part II, Galeano explains the origin of Colombia's lengthy armed conflict, driven by the wealth generated by land exploitation and coffee production, and how the ambitions of the American United Fruit Company ignited the Guatemalan Civil War. He also explains the history of violence in Mexico, beginning with the US's occupation of half its territory in 1848. Throughout this part, Galeano continues to narrate tragic historical events encouraged by the United States and corporations that have led to war, poverty, and suffering. Galeano also explains how foreign companies had as an objective the weakening of Latin American states in order to get access to their resources. He criticizes capitalism and its institutions, including the International Monetary Fund (IMF).

Lastly, in Part III, written 7 years later, Galeano summarizes the events that had taken place since the publication of the book. He argues that the events discussed in the second part of the book continue to happen and that the US continues to dominate the region. He concludes by stating that Latin America’s situation has continued to worsen.

=== Themes ===
==== Colonialism ====
Galeano discusses colonialism in terms of the negative consequences it had in Latin America. He argues that colonialism gave entry to violent capitalism, which, in turn, brought discrimination, exploitation of natural resources, and oppression.

==== Imperialism ====
Colonialism transforming into imperialistic exploitation is an important theme of the book: "It is Latin America, the region of open veins. From the discovery to the present day, everything has always been transmuted into European capital or, later, North American capital, and as such it has accumulated and accumulates in the distant centers of power."

==== Dependency theory ====
The dependency theory is at the core of Open Veins, which argues that the underdeveloped status of the Global South is not a natural state but rather the result of the economic exploitation of such a region by the developed countries in the North.

Dependency theory opposes modernization theory, which proposes that differentiation, specialized institutions, and certain societal values are necessary for countries to develop. This theory assumes that the pattern of modernization that developed countries took was the correct one, encouraging developing countries to follow in the footsteps of the North. While the Modernization theory considers solely internal factors affecting society, the Dependency theory takes into account both internal factors and the role such a society plays in the global context.

Open Veins discusses dependency theory by arguing that Latin America, since colonial times, has been looted by Europe and then by the United States, which explains why Latin America remains underdeveloped. Galeano argued that Latin America was not an example of underdevelopment due to lack of modernization but rather a victim of Europe's and the US's exploitation. "We lost; others won. But it happens that those who won, won because we lost", Galeano stated.

== Genre ==
=== Latin American resistance literature ===
Latin America has a long history of expressing its culture of resistance through various means; for instance, during colonization, oral tradition allowed indigenous communities to share their dissent. Since the nineteenth century, this attitude of resistance found its expression through writers who were vocal opponents of imperialist forms of power.

In the twentieth century, this notion was coupled with an increased Pan-American sentiment and led to detailed literature analyzing Latin America's resistance culture. A common theme among this body of work was the idea of a fragmented Latin American society as a consequence of oppression and violence. Open Veins exemplifies Latin America's resistance literature of the twentieth century.

== Reception ==
Shortly after the publication of Open Veins, the book quickly gained popularity throughout developed countries, but for its left-wing perspective the book was banned under the right-wing military governments of Brazil, Chile, Argentina and Uruguay.

The Library Journal review stated, "Well written and passionately stated, this is an intellectually honest and valuable study." Since its publication in the early 1970s, Open Veins has been taught extensively in American universities, including in geography, economics, history, and anthropology courses.

In 2014, at an event in Brazil honoring the author on the 43rd anniversary of the book's publication, Galeano expressed some regrets, saying:

"Open Veins tried to be a book of political economy, but I didn't yet have the necessary training or preparation...I wouldn't be capable of reading this book again; I'd keel over. For me, this prose of the traditional left is extremely leaden, and my physique can't tolerate it."

Opponents interpreted this statement as a renunciation of the book and considered it proof of the book's inaccuracy. For instance, Carlos Alberto Montaner, exiled Cuban writer, wrote a text called "Galeano Corrects Himself and the Idiots Lose their Bible".

Galeano described these critics as "seriously ill with bad faith". In a 2014 interview with Jorge Majfud, Galeano stated,

"The book, written ages ago, is still alive and kicking. I am simply honest enough to admit that at this point in my life the old writing style seems rather stodgy, and that it's hard for me to recognize myself in it since I now prefer to be increasingly brief and untrammeled."

== Cultural and political significance ==
In his analysis of the impact of Open Veins, Director of Georgetown University’s Center for Latin American Studies, Marc Chernik, stated that Eduardo Galeano’s worldview in the book has had transformational consequences for an entire generation of intellectuals, students, and politicians. One consequence was the rise of a new approach to marginalized communities, who were no longer perceived as “underdeveloped” regions but rather as areas that were striving to overcome the negative impact colonization and imperialism had in the subcontinent. This argument, later known as the Dependency theory, was presented by several authors but it was Galeano who shared the idea with the entire region.

Mexican author Elena Poniatowska, winner of the 2013 Miguel de Cervantes Prize, said in an interview with BBC that what Galeano did in Open Veins had never been done before. "He gathered thousands of the most forgotten voices of Latin America," Poniatowska stated. Similarly, Jorge Volpi, another Mexican author, argued that Open Veins is one of the most influential texts written in Latin America during the twentieth-century and that "it opened the eyes of many young writers and political activists regarding the exploitation of this [Latin America] part of the world."

Open Veins also was and continues to be part of the battle of ideas that initiated during the Cold War, by becoming a symbol of opposition to the intervention of the United States and other foreign powers in Latin American affairs.

In the foreword to the 1997 edition, Isabel Allende stated that "after the military coup of 1973 I could not take much with me: some clothes, family pictures, a small bag of dirt from my garden, and two books: an old edition of the Odes by Pablo Neruda and the book with the yellow cover, Las venas abiertas de América Latina". Allende claims that the 1973 Military Coup against her uncle and leftist Chilean president Salvador Allende that gave rise to the long dictatorship of Augusto Pinochet could have been predicted based on Open Veins. The book, she argues, was proof that "no safe islands" existed in Latin America and that the government of Salvador Allende was “doomed from the beginning.”

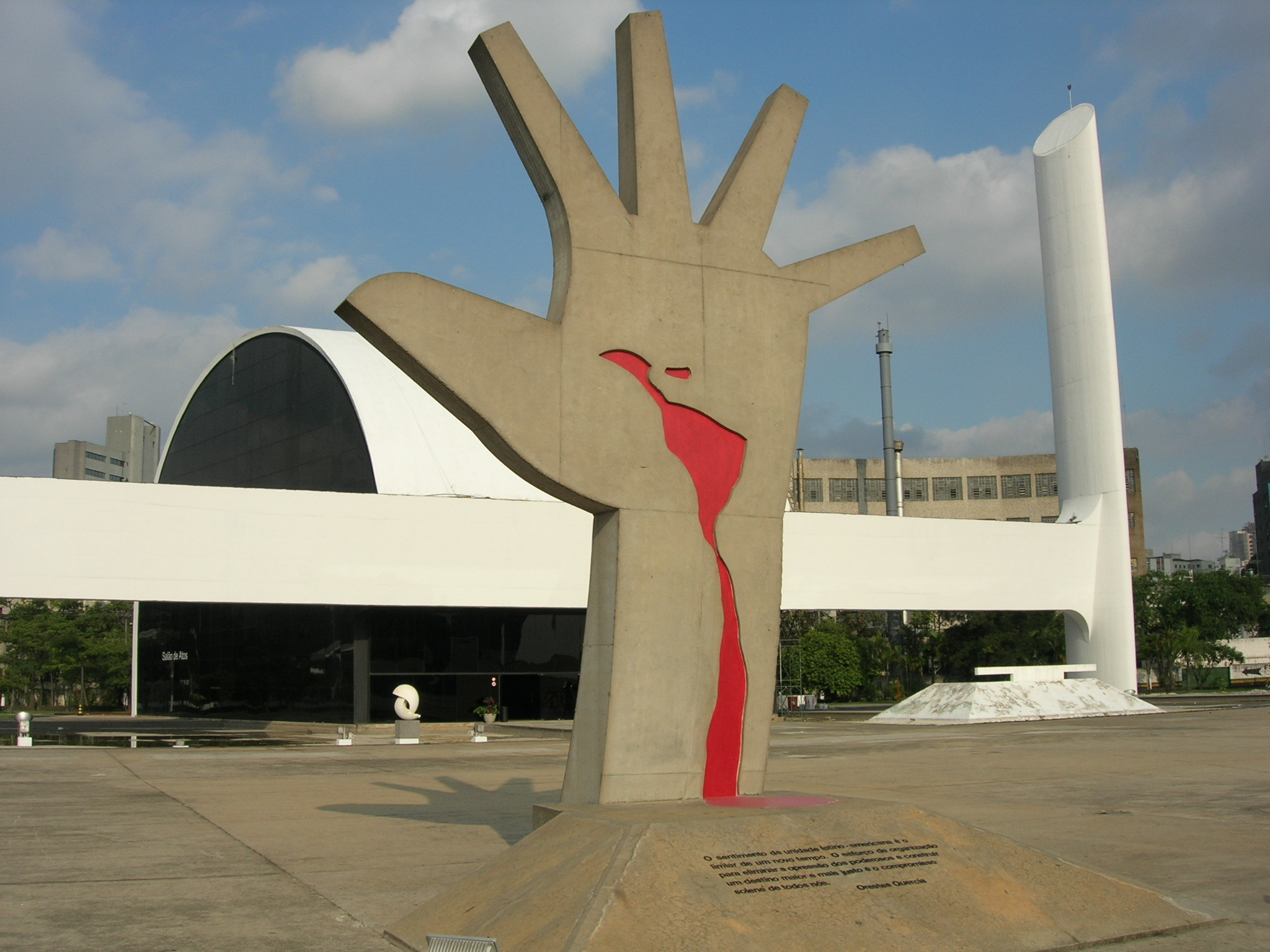
Shot of the Mão of Oscar Niemeyer, representing the "open veins of Latin America," in the Latin American Memorial in São Paulo, Brazil.

Venezuelan President Hugo Chávez gave United States President Barack Obama a Spanish copy of Open Veins of Latin America as a gift at the 5th Summit of the Americas in 2009, as an attempt to reinvigorate the argument of the book. As a result of this international exposure, the book's sales rose sharply—it was the 54,295th most popular book on Amazon.com before the event, but it became second a day later. In the opinion of El Espectador the core ideas of Open Veins have not been able to retake the central position they once had in Latin American discussions of political economy and development.

In the environmental context, some have argued that the continued exploitation of land for the benefit of a few demonstrates that the book remains relevant. This argument is based on the first part of the book, "Mankind’s poverty as a consequence of the wealth of the land."

Moreover, Galeano's 2014 self-criticism of the book did not diminish the role it played in creating awareness about the inequality between the Global North-Global South interactions; scholars have argued that Open Veins had a part in encouraging movements of integration in the South, including the formation of MERCOSUR.

Open Veins has also inspired numerous works of art and musical compositions. Among them: The Latin American Memorial in São Paulo, Brazil, an art assemblage by artist Oscar Niemeyer from which a large sculpture of a left hand bleeding, representing the “open veins of Latin America,” stands out; and the song Las venas abiertas de América Latina by composer Caio Facó, which touches upon the thematics of colonization in the cultural sphere.

== See also ==
- How Europe Underdeveloped Africa, a 1972 book describing how Africa was deliberately exploited and underdeveloped by European regimes
