= Marcha (newspaper) =

Former Uruguayan weekly newspaper

- Navigare necesse vivere non necesse
- Type: Weekly
- Founder: Carlos Quijano
- Editor: Carlos Quijano
- Founded: 23 June 1939
- Ceased publication: 1979
- Language: Spanish
- Country: Uruguay

Marcha was an influential Uruguayan weekly newspaper.

== History ==
The first issue was published in Montevideo on 23 June 1939. Founder and editor was Carlos Quijano, with Juan Carlos Onetti as deputy editor. Its motto was "Navigare necesse vivere non necesse".

The orientation of this weekly newspaper was independent leftist, and it was very influential in Uruguay and all Latin America. Many notable journalists and intellectuals wrote on its pages: Arturo Ardao, Amílcar Castro, Juan Pedro Zeballos, Julio Castro, Sarandy Cabrera, Alfredo Mario Ferreiro, Hugo Alfaro, Homero Alsina Thevenet, Carlos Martínez Moreno, Manuel Flores Mora, Carlos Real de Azúa, Mario Benedetti, Álvaro Castillo, Eduardo Galeano, Ángel Rama, Alfredo Zitarrosa, Rubén Enrique Romano, María Esther Gilio, Gerardo Fernández, Salvador Bécquer Puig, Hiber Conteris, Guillermo Chifflet, etc.

There were also two sister publication: the monthly Cuadernos de Marcha, and the collection Biblioteca de Marcha.

In 1973 it denounced the Uruguayan coup d'état. A year later it was closed down by the dictatorship, and Carlos Quijano had to go to Mexico in exile.

In 1985, months after the dictatorship was over, the old group of Marcha met and decided to open a new weekly newspaper. As they considered impossible to edit that same old publication without Quijano (who had died a year earlier in exile), they decided that it could not be named Marcha; this was the birth of Brecha, which is still published today.

== Bibliography ==
- Peirano Basso, Luisa (2001). Marcha de Montevideo y la formación de la conciencia latinoamericana a través de sus cuadernos (PDF) (in Spanish). Buenos Aires: Javier Vergara Editor. Archived from the original (PDF) on 2013-10-03.
