= Nuestra Señora del Rosario y San Benito de Palermo, Paysandú =

Roman Catholic parish church in Paysandú, Uruguay

Coordinates: 32.3171°S 58.0797°W

Nuestra Señora del Rosario y San Benito de Palermo
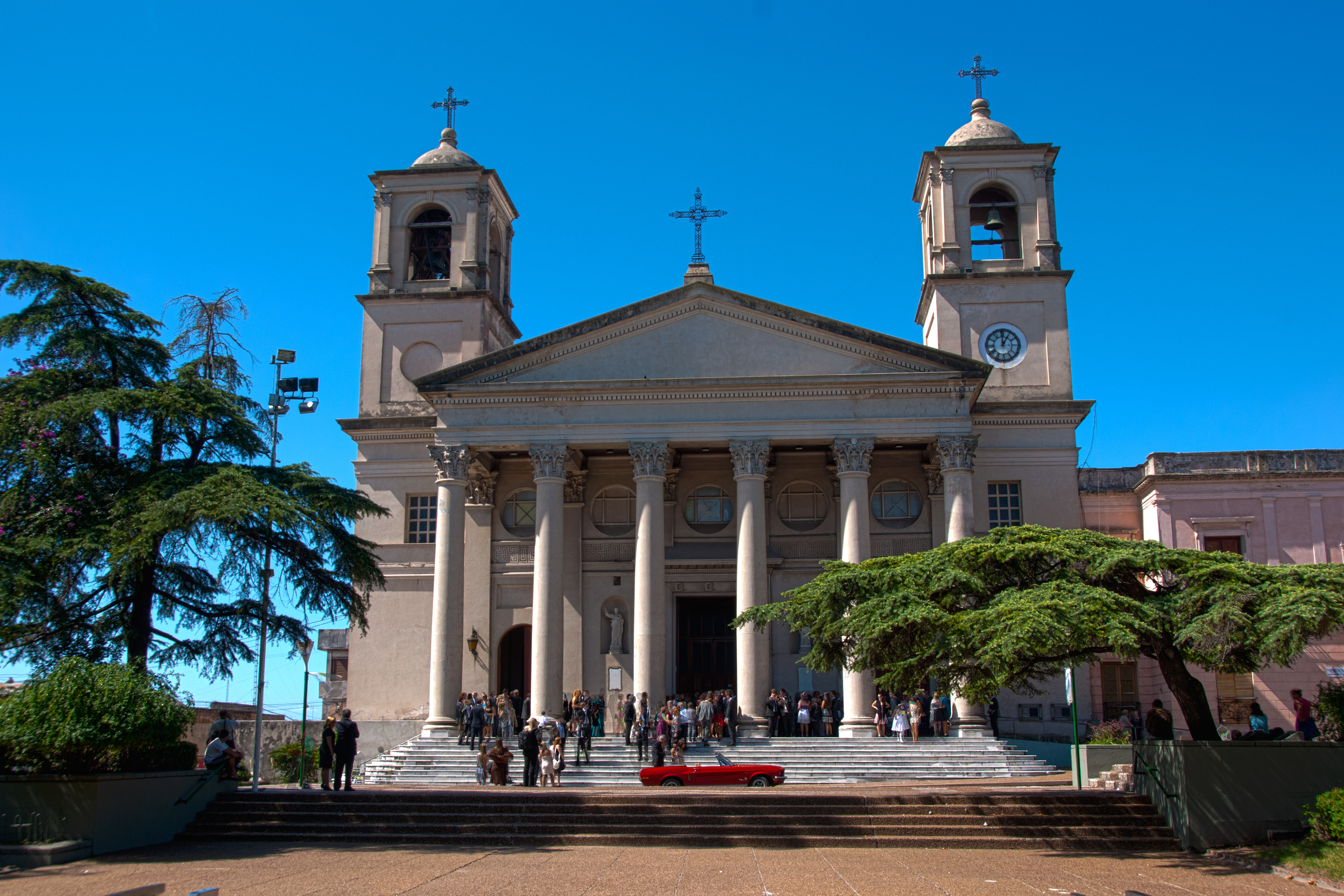

Religion
- Affiliation: Catholic Church
- Ecclesiastical or organizational status: Parish church
- Year consecrated: 1860

Location
- Location: Paysandú, Uruguay
- Interactive map of Nuestra Señora del Rosario y San Benito de Palermo

Architecture
- Type: Basilica

The Basilica of Our Lady of the Rosary and St. Benedict of Palermo (Spanish: Basílica de Nuestra Señora del Rosario y San Benito de Palermo) is a Catholic parish church in Paysandú, Uruguay.

== History ==
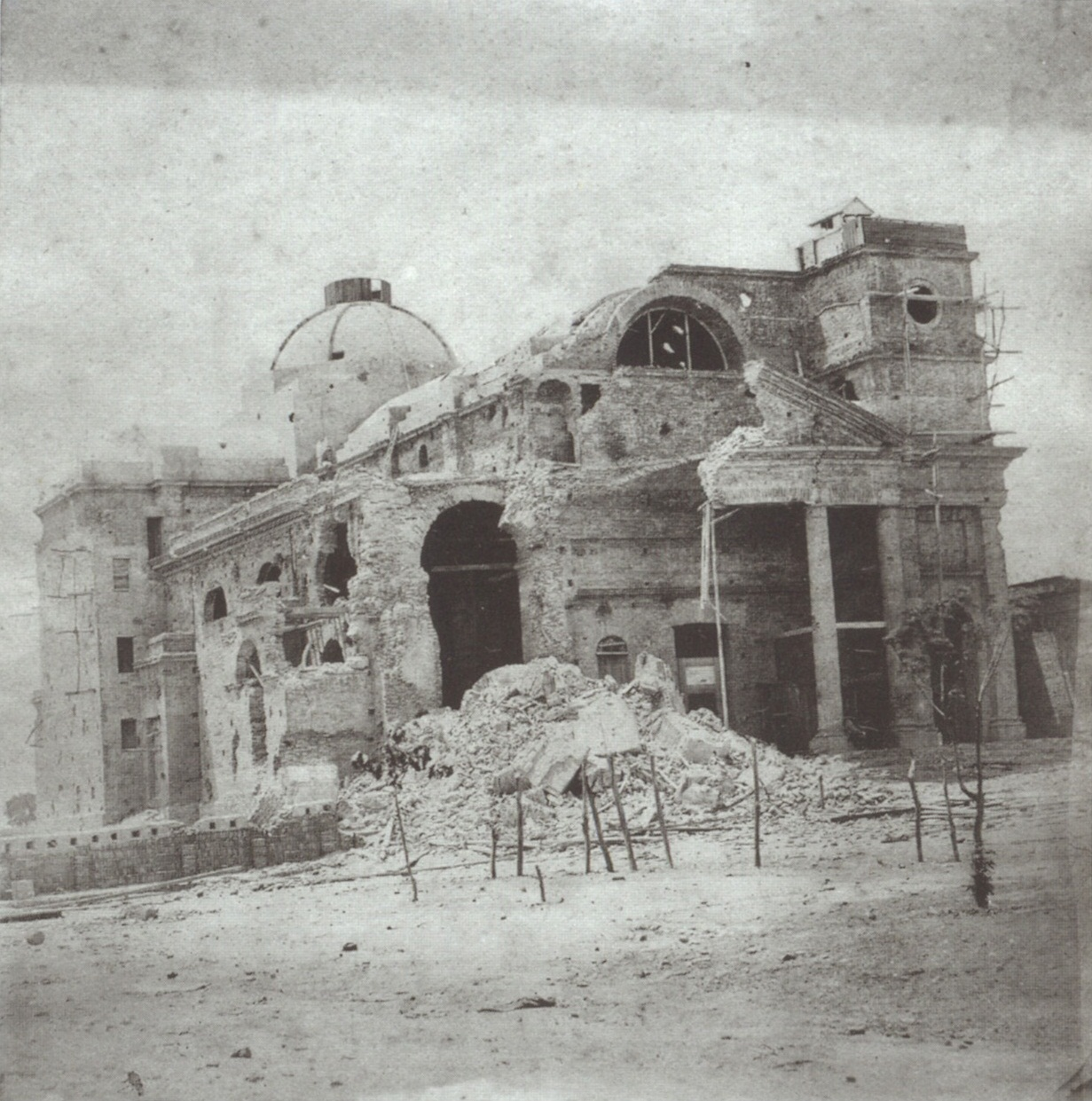
Ruins of the church after the siege of 1864–1865

The parish was established in 1805.

The current temple was built in 1860, severely damaged during the siege of Paysandú (1864-1865) and rebuilt afterwards. It is dedicated to saint Benedict the Moor and the Virgin of the Rosary.

In 1906 a Walcker organ was inaugurated.

In 1949, Pope Pius XII proclaimed it basilica minor.

Currently, a fundraising committee is advocating its refurbishment, understanding that, apart from its great religious and historic significance, this temple is also the venue of important cultural events.
