= Hiber Conteris =

Uruguayan writer, playwright, and literary critic (1933–2020)

Hiber Conteris (Paysandú, 23 September 1933 – 2 June 2020) was a Uruguayan writer, playwright, and literary critic.

He wrote extensively in the pages of Marcha and, as a Methodist, he was very influential in the Protestant world.

== Works ==
- 1959: Enterrar a los muertos
- 1960: Este otro lado del telón
- 1963: Cono Sur
- 1963: El socavón
- 1963: El desvío
- 1965: Villa Anastacio
- 1966: Virginia en Flashback
- 1968: El nadador, Roman
- 1969: El asesinato de Malcolm X
- 1986: El Intruso
- 1986: El diez por ciento de tu vida
- 1987: La Diana en el Crepúsculo
- 1987: Información sobre la Ruta 1
- 1988: La cifra anónima
- 1996: ¿Qué desea cenar?
- 1996: El breve verano de Nefertiti
- 1998: El cielo puede esperar
- 1998: Round Trip – Viaje regresivo
- 1999: Mi largo adiós a Raymond Chandler
- 2001: Rastros de ceniza
- 2002: Oscura memoria del sur
- 2005: Onetti en el espejo
- 2008: El Intruso
