= Alfredo Mario Ferreiro =

Alfredo Mario Ferreiro (1 March 1899 – 24 June 1959) was a Uruguayan writer and poet. He is best known for his poetry collection, El Hombre que se comió un autobus (1927, tr: the man who ate a bus).

He contributed to the weekly Uruguayan newspaper Marcha.

== Works ==
- The man who ate a bus (subtitled Poems smelling gasoline) (The Southern Cross. Montevideo 1927.)
- Please do not shake hands (subtitled Poems images based prophylactic buffed) (1930)
