= Paysandú =

City in Uruguay

- Capital city
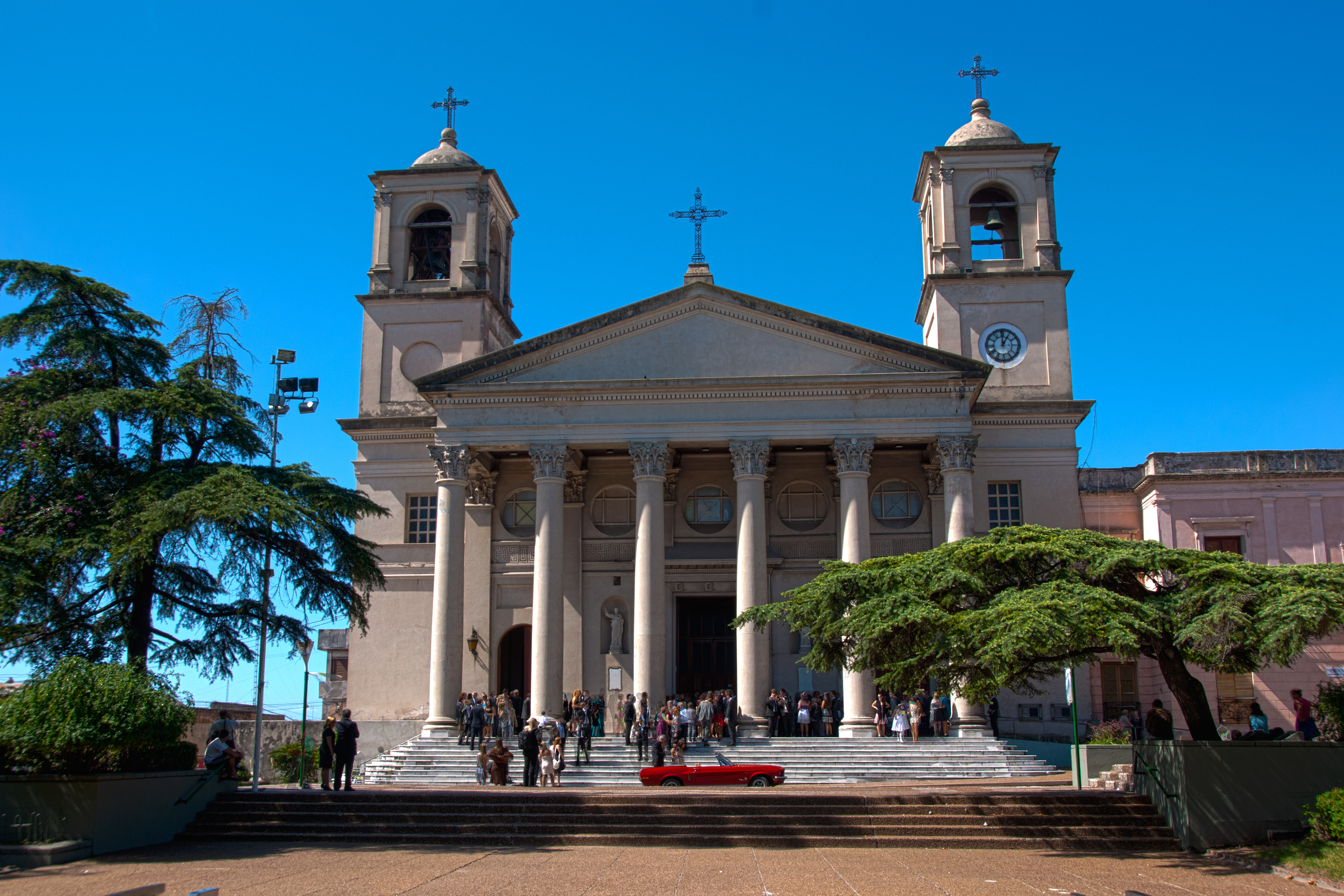
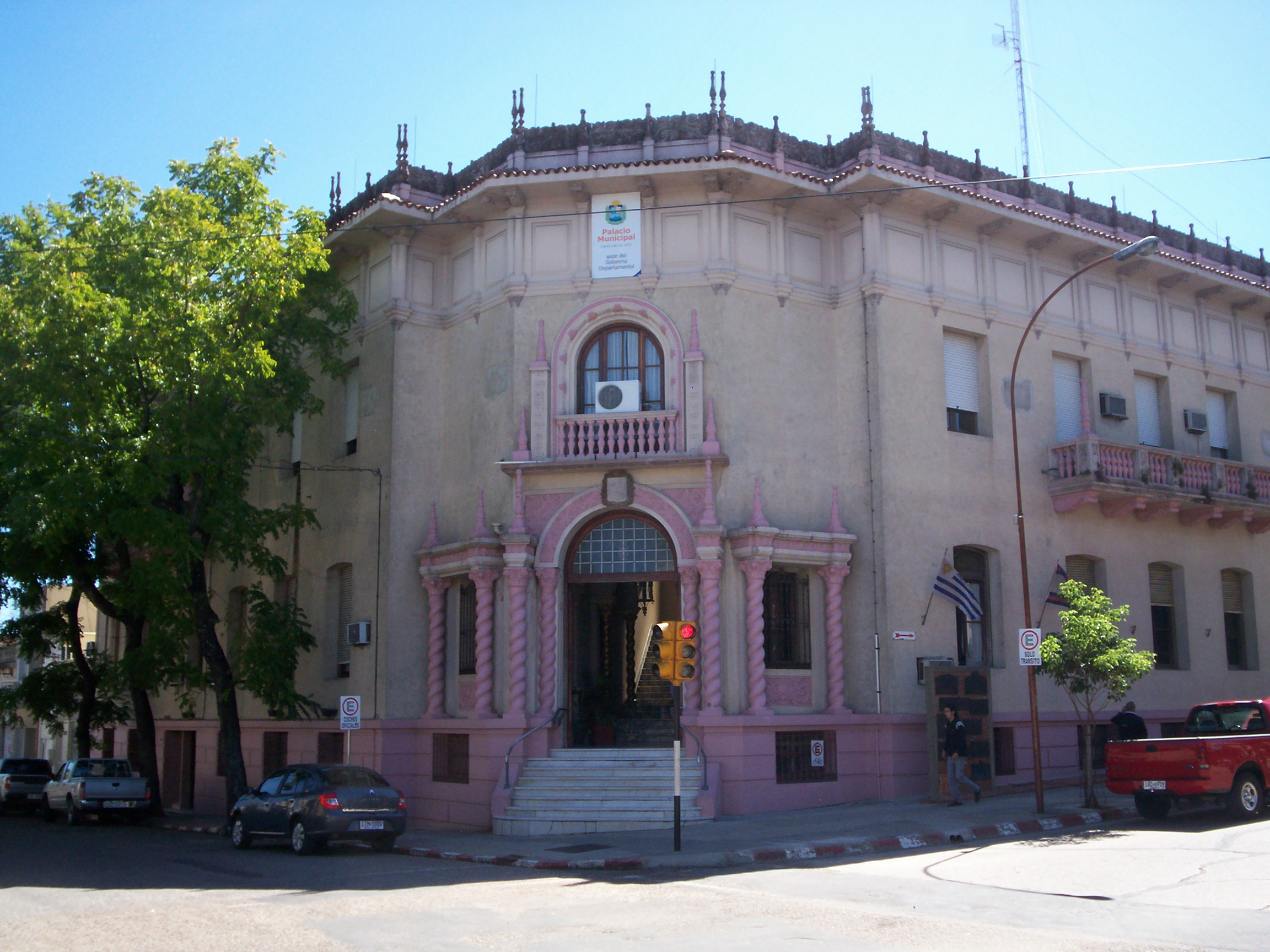
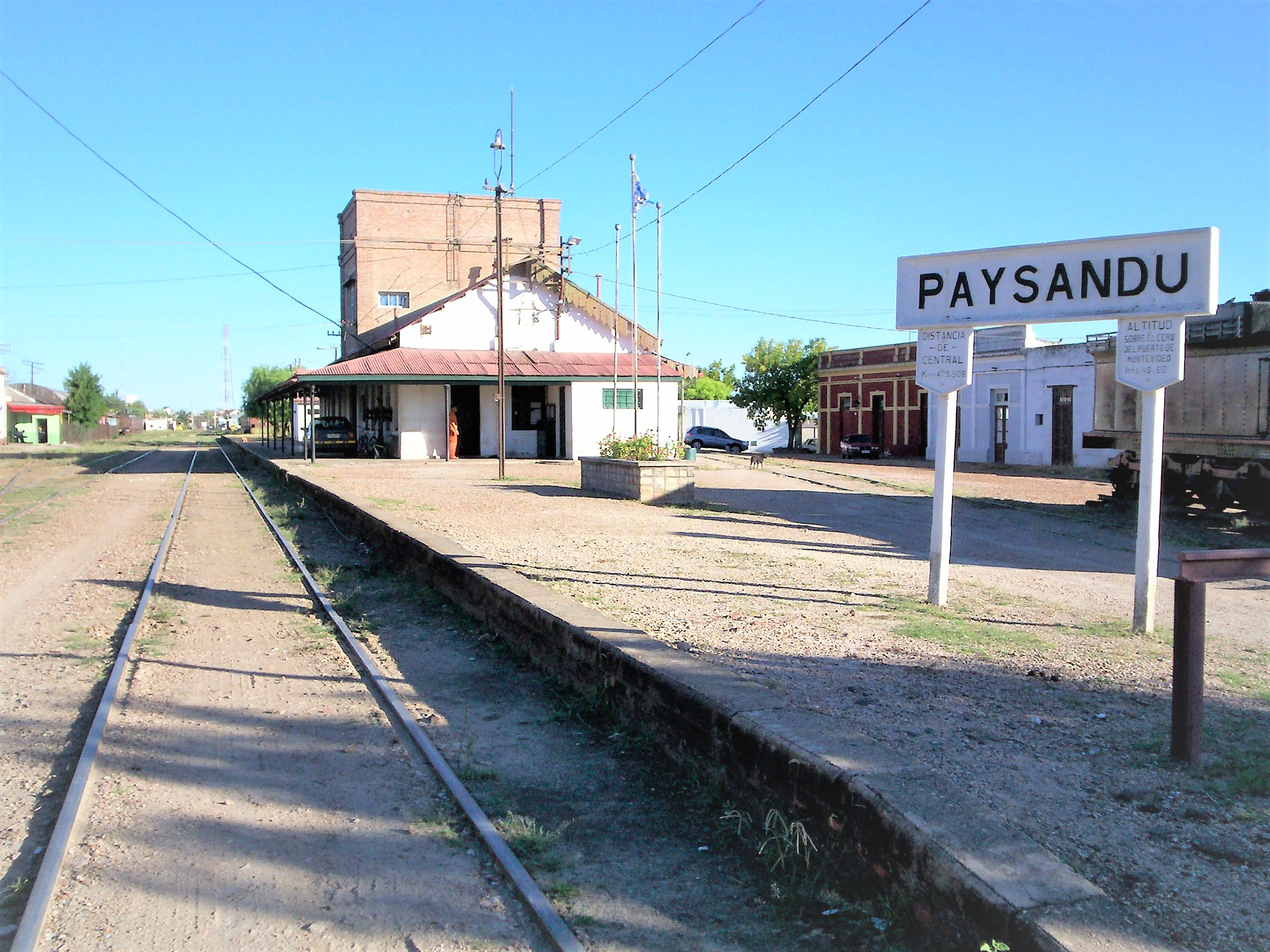
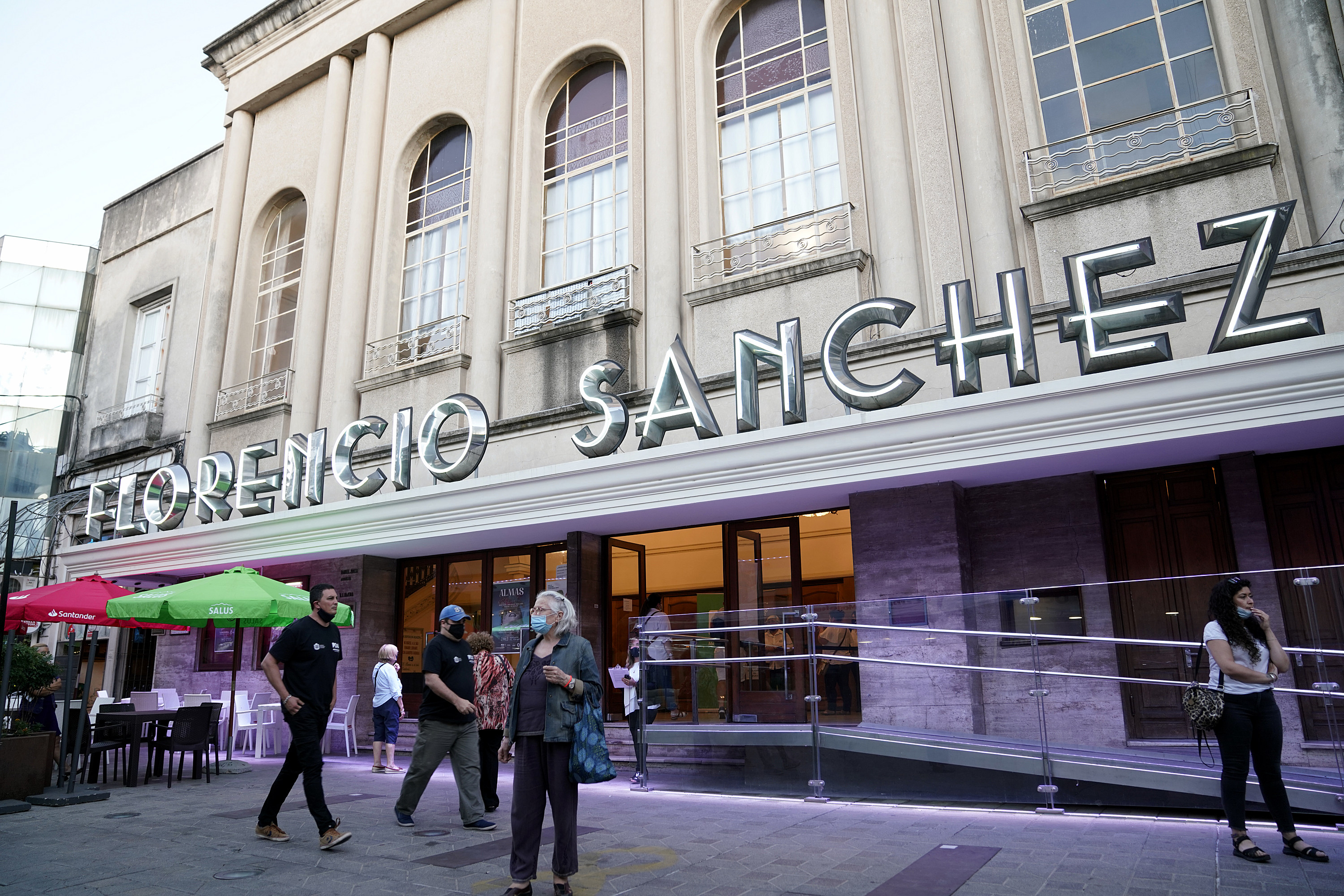
- Basilica of Our Lady of the Rosary and St. Benedict of Palermo Paysandú City Hall Railway station Florencio Sanchez Theater

- Location in Uruguay
- Coordinates: 32°19′17″S 58°4′32″W
- Country: Uruguay
- Department: Paysandú
- Founded: 1756

Area
  - Total: 21.5 km^{2} (8.3 sq mi)
- Elevation: 34 m (112 ft)

Population (2023)
  - Total: 81,550
  - Density: 3,790/km^{2} (9,820/sq mi)
- Time zone: UTC −3
- Postal code: 60000
- Dial plan: +598 472 (+5 digits)
- Climate: Cfa

Paysandú (Spanish pronunciation: [pajsanˈdu]) is the capital and most populous city of the Paysandú Department in western Uruguay. Located on the banks of the Uruguay River, it is the country's fourth-largest city and a vital cultural and economic hub, with agriculture, tourism, and manufacturing serving as key industries.

Located in the southwestern part of the department, across from the Argentine city of Colón in Entre Ríos Province, it was founded in the mid-18th century and is known as the La Heroica (Spanish for 'The Heroic City') for its rich history, particularly its resistance during the Siege of Paysandú in 1864-65.

== History ==
It was founded in October 1756 and had acquired the status of "Villa" (town) before the independence of Uruguay. On 8 June 1863, its status was elevated to "Ciudad" (city) by the Act of Ley Nº 780.

General Leandro Gomez led Uruguayan forces to save the town from an invasion by Brazilian forces in 1864–1865. A battle took place on 2 December 1864.

From the late nineteenth century, Paysandú experienced a significant influx of Italian immigrants, who settled in both urban and rural areas. Initially, many were engaged in river transport, trade and agriculture. By the early twentieth century, the city had become one of the principal centers of Italian settlement in Uruguay, second only to Montevideo. During this period, various associations and institutions were established to serve and organize the Italian community. By 1992, it was estimated that approximately 65% of the population of the Paysandú Department was of Italian descent.

== Population ==
In 2023 Paysandú had a population of 81,550. It is the fourth largest city in Uruguay, after Montevideo, Salto and Ciudad de la Costa.

Year	Population
1908	20,953
1963	51,645
1975	62,199
1985	68,466
1996	74,568
2004	73,292
2011	76,412
2023	81,550

Source: National Statistics Institute

Paysandú is more cosmopolitan than most Uruguayan cities, with many settlers from Italy, Switzerland, Poland, Germany, Russia, Ukraine, Belgium and various African nations.

== Geography ==
The city is located on the banks of the Uruguay River, which forms the border with Argentina. It lies 378 kilometres (235 mi) northwest of Montevideo via Route 1 and Route 3, on the junction of the latter with Route 90. As of the census of 2011 it was the fourth-most populated city of the country.

A small distance north of the city is the General Artigas Bridge that links Uruguay with the Entre Ríos Province of Argentina, south of the city Colón.

=== Climate ===
Paysandú has a humid subtropical climate, described by the Köppen climate classification as Cfa. Summers are warm to hot and winters are cool, with the occurrence of frosts and fog. The precipitation is evenly distributed throughout the year, although winters are slightly drier, with an average of 1,181 mm (46.5 in), and the annual average temperature is around 19 °C (66 °F). On 20 January 1943, Paysandú recorded a temperature of 44.0 °C (111.2 °F), which is the joint highest (along with Florida) temperature to have ever been recorded in Uruguay. The lowest temperature to have ever been recorded in Paysandú is −7.4 °C (18.7 °F) in June.

Climate data for Paysandú, Uruguay (1991–2020, extremes 1937–2020)
Month	Jan	Feb	Mar	Apr	May	Jun	Jul	Aug	Sep	Oct	Nov	Dec	Year
Record high °C (°F)	44.0 (111.2)	42.4 (108.3)	39.4 (102.9)	36.0 (96.8)	33.0 (91.4)	29.8 (85.6)	30.6 (87.1)	33.8 (92.8)	36.4 (97.5)	38.0 (100.4)	41.5 (106.7)	42.0 (107.6)	44.0 (111.2)
Mean daily maximum °C (°F)	31.7 (89.1)	30.1 (86.2)	28.5 (83.3)	24.6 (76.3)	20.4 (68.7)	17.6 (63.7)	17.0 (62.6)	19.6 (67.3)	21.2 (70.2)	24.1 (75.4)	27.7 (81.9)	30.2 (86.4)	24.4 (75.9)
Daily mean °C (°F)	25.1 (77.2)	23.9 (75.0)	22.4 (72.3)	18.9 (66.0)	15.4 (59.7)	12.6 (54.7)	12.0 (53.6)	13.9 (57.0)	15.4 (59.7)	18.4 (65.1)	21.3 (70.3)	23.7 (74.7)	18.6 (65.5)
Mean daily minimum °C (°F)	18.5 (65.3)	17.8 (64.0)	16.3 (61.3)	13.3 (55.9)	10.4 (50.7)	7.7 (45.9)	7.0 (44.6)	8.2 (46.8)	9.7 (49.5)	12.6 (54.7)	14.8 (58.6)	17.1 (62.8)	12.8 (55.0)
Record low °C (°F)	7.8 (46.0)	3.2 (37.8)	3.2 (37.8)	0.0 (32.0)	−2.6 (27.3)	−7.4 (18.7)	−6.6 (20.1)	−4.0 (24.8)	−3.4 (25.9)	0.0 (32.0)	2.3 (36.1)	4.8 (40.6)	−7.4 (18.7)
Average precipitation mm (inches)	141.0 (5.55)	136.1 (5.36)	111.5 (4.39)	154.4 (6.08)	108.7 (4.28)	72.4 (2.85)	55.2 (2.17)	74.6 (2.94)	78.9 (3.11)	121.3 (4.78)	105.2 (4.14)	132.4 (5.21)	1,291.7 (50.85)
Average precipitation days (≥ 1.0 mm)	7	7	6	7	6	5	5	5	6	8	6	7	75
Average relative humidity (%)	62	67	70	75	77	78	74	72	71	70	67	63	71
Mean monthly sunshine hours	285.2	226.0	232.5	198.0	186.0	153.0	173.6	192.2	201.0	229.4	255.0	279.0	2,610.9
Mean daily sunshine hours	9.2	8.0	7.5	6.6	6.0	5.1	5.6	6.2	6.7	7.4	8.5	9.0	7.2
Source 1: Instituto Uruguayo de Metereología
Source 2: NOAA (precipitation 1991–2020), Instituto Nacional de Investigación Agropecuaria (humidity and sun 1980–2009)

== Economy ==
The main industries in the city are Norteña brewery, Azucarlito (sugar), Paylana (which is a producer of world-class woolen fabrics), and Paycuero (leather). Paysandú is also the centre of plantation forest industry in Uruguay, with many companies involved in the planting and harvesting of Eucalyptus plantations.

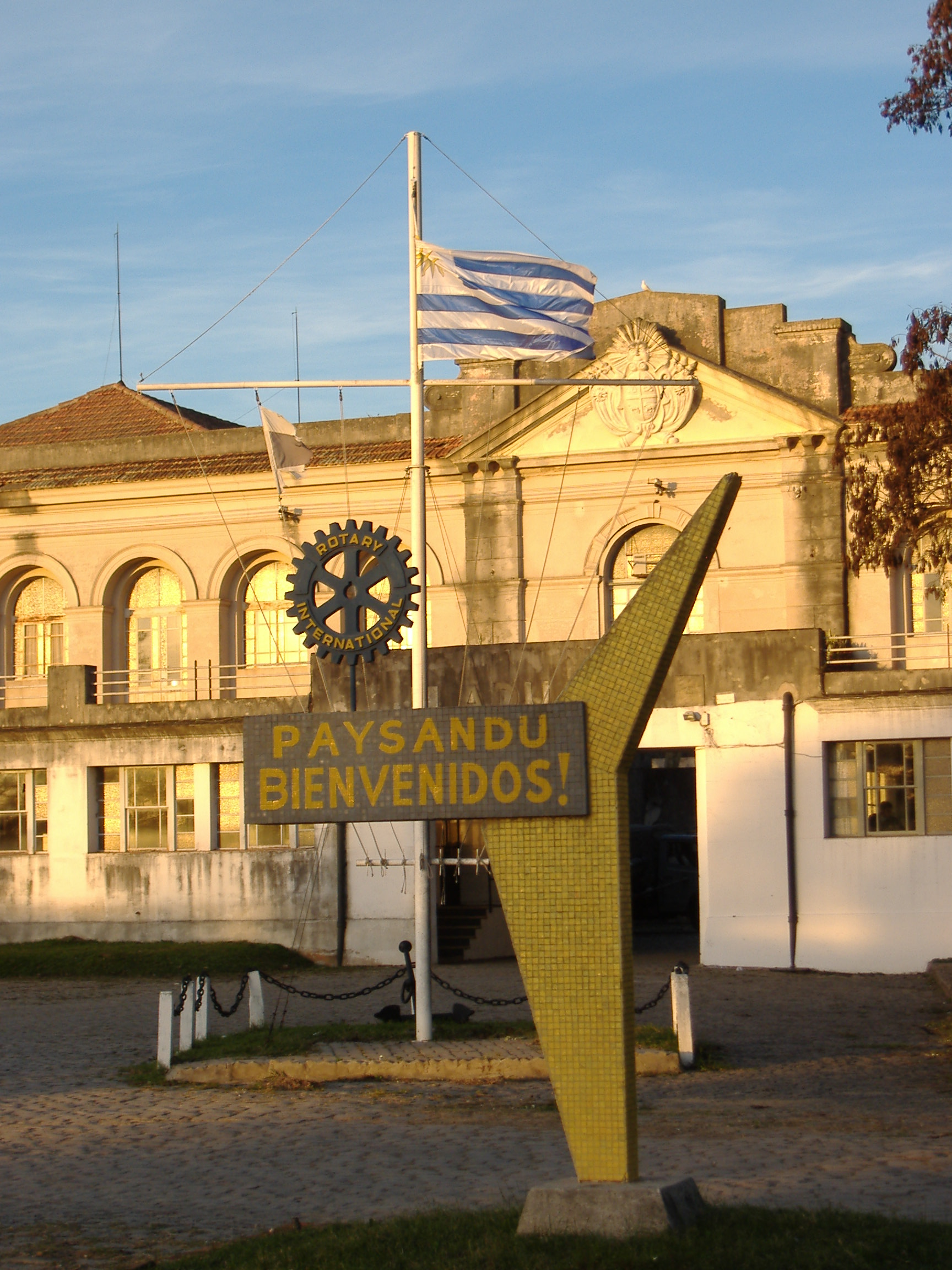
A welcome sign in the old port of Paysandú

== Transportation ==
The city is served by Tydeo Larre Borges International Airport.

== Recreation ==
Paysandú has some fine recreational beaches on the Uruguay River which have lifeguards during the summer. It is also home to many sporting clubs, including a rowing club, yacht club, and numerous others for football, rugby, hockey, tennis and polo.

== Education ==
Previously the area had a German school, Deutsche Schule Paysandú.

Also the city has a Center of the University of the Republic (Centro Universitario de Paysandú).

== Places of worship ==
- Parish Church of Our Lady of the Rosary and St. Benedict of Palermo (Roman Catholic)
- St. Raymond and St. John Bosco Parish Church (Roman Catholic, Salesians of Don Bosco)
- Sacred Heart of Jesus Parish Church (Roman Catholic)
- St. Joseph the Worker Parish Church (Roman Catholic)

== Notable people ==
=== Politicians ===
- Reinaldo Gargano (FA), Foreign Minister of Uruguay (2005–2008) †
- Jorge Larrañaga (PN), Senator (1956-2021) †
- Raúl Sendic Rodríguez (FA), Vice-President of Uruguay 2015–2017

=== Football players ===
- Sebastián Soria, Qatari football player
- Walter Gargano, football player of Peñarol
- Nicolás Lodeiro, football player of Seattle Sounders FC
- Bosco Frontán, retired footballer who played mostly in Uruguay and Mexico
- Egidio Arévalo Rios, the 10th most capped player for Uruguay with 91, currently with Correcaminos UAT
- Maxi Gómez, football player of Trabzonspor
- Marcelo Saracchi, football player of Levante
- Miguel Merentiel, football player of Boca Juniors

=== Musicians ===
- Los Iracundos
- Alfredo Eusebio Gobbi, tango musician

=== Other ===
- Clotilde Luisi (1882–1969), first woman to study law at the University of the Republic
- Ricardo Armentano, professor and researcher of international repute
- Hiber Conteris (1933-2020), literary critic and playwright
- Cecilia Comunales (born 1988), world champion boxer

== Twinned cities ==
- Hellín, Spain
- Muscatine, Iowa, United States
- Smara, Western Sahara

== See also ==
- List of diplomatic missions in Uruguay#Consulate in Paysandú
