= Siege of Paysandú =

1864 siege in South America

- Part of the Uruguayan War
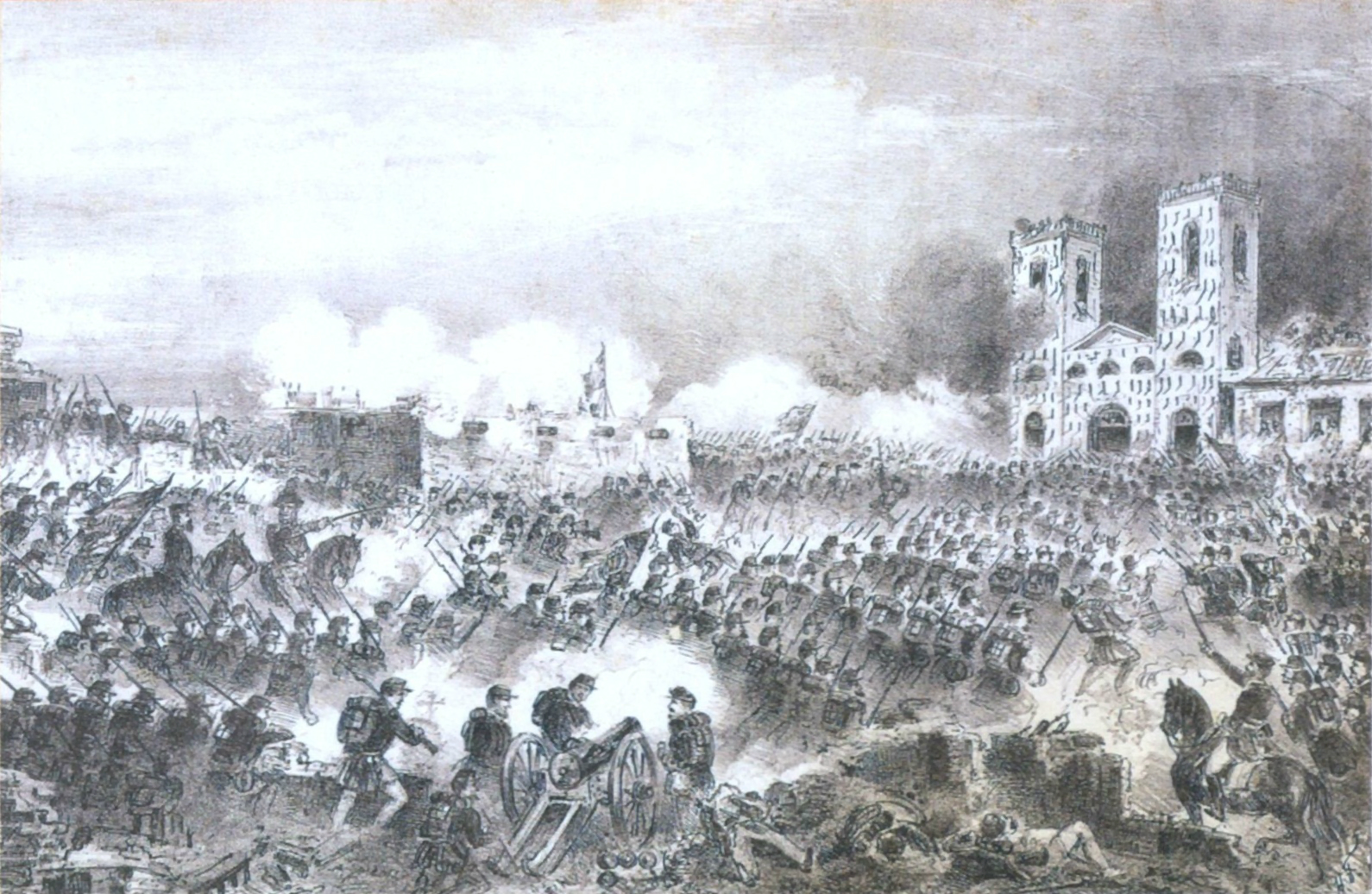
- Brazilians and Colorados storm the town of Paysandú
Date	3 December 1864 – 2 January 1865
Location	Paysandú, Uruguay
Result	Brazilian–Colorado victory

Belligerents
Empire of Brazil; Colorados	Uruguay

Commanders and leaders
(Empire of Brazil) Joaquim M. Lisboa; Venancio Flores	(Uruguay) Leandro Gómez (executed); (Uruguay) Lucas Píriz †; (Uruguay) Tristão Azambuja

Strength
Brazil: 2,210; 30 cannons Colorados: 800; 7 cannons	1,254; 15 cannons

Casualties and losses
Brazil: 90 dead 207 wounded Colorados: Unknown	400 dead and wounded

The Siege of Paysandú began on 3 December 1864, during the Uruguayan War, when Brazilian forces (under the Marquis of Tamandaré) and Colorado forces (under Venancio Flores) attempted to capture the city of Paysandú in Uruguay from its Uruguayan Army defenders. The siege ended on 2 January 1865, when the Brazilian and Colorado forces conquered the town.

== Siege ==
By 3 December 1864 the Brazilian navy enforced a blockade of Paysandú with one corvette and four gunboats. The besieged garrison had 1,254 men and 15 cannons, under the command of Colonel Leandro Gómez. The Brazilians had 1,695 infantrymen, 195 artillerymen, 320 navy personnel (for a total of 2,210 men) and 30 cannons. The Colorados deploying 800 infantrymen and 7 cannons (3 of which were rifled). Colonel Gómez declined an offer to surrender. From 6 December until 8 December, the Brazilians and Colorados made attempts to storm the town, advancing through the streets, but were unable to take it. Tamandaré and Flores decided to await Brazil's Army of the South.

Meanwhile, Uruguay sent General Juan Saá with 3,000 men and 4 cannons to relieve the besieged town. The Brazilians and Colorados briefly lift their siege while dealing with this new threat. Saá abandoned his advance before encountering the enemy force, and fled north of the Río Negro. On 29 December, Field Marshal João Propício Mena Barreto's Army of the South reached Paysandú, with two infantry brigades and one artillery regiment under Lieutenant Colonel Émile Mallet; while Brazilian cavalry established camp a few kilometers away. Meanwhile, in Paysandú commander Gómez beheaded forty Colorados and fifteen Brazilian prisoners and "hung their still-dripping heads above his trenches in full view of their compatriots".

On 31 December, Brazilians and Colorados recommenced their attack, and after a bitter struggle overran the city's defenses on 2 January 1865.

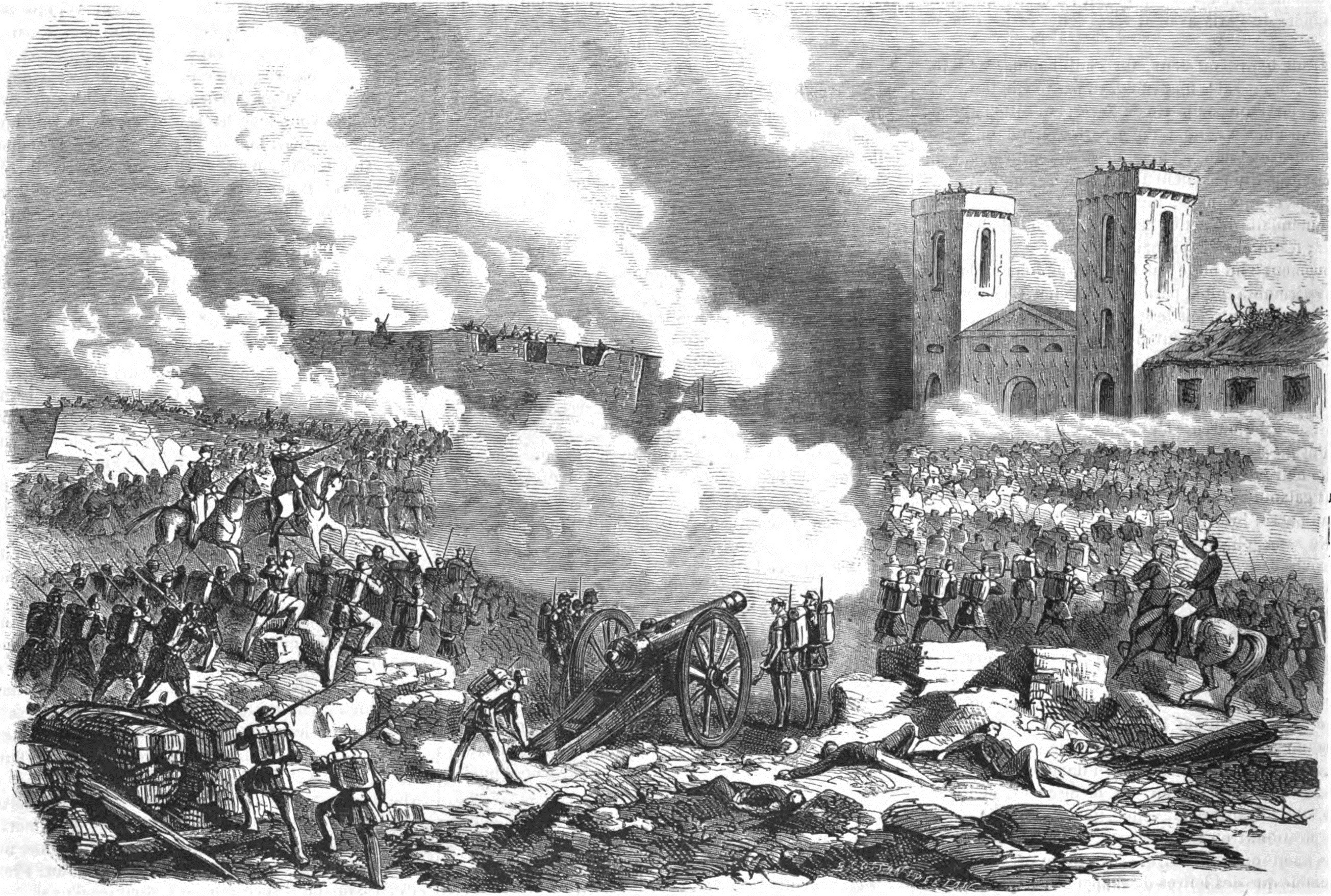
Siege of Paysandú (L'Illustration, Vol. XLV, No. 1.151, 1865)

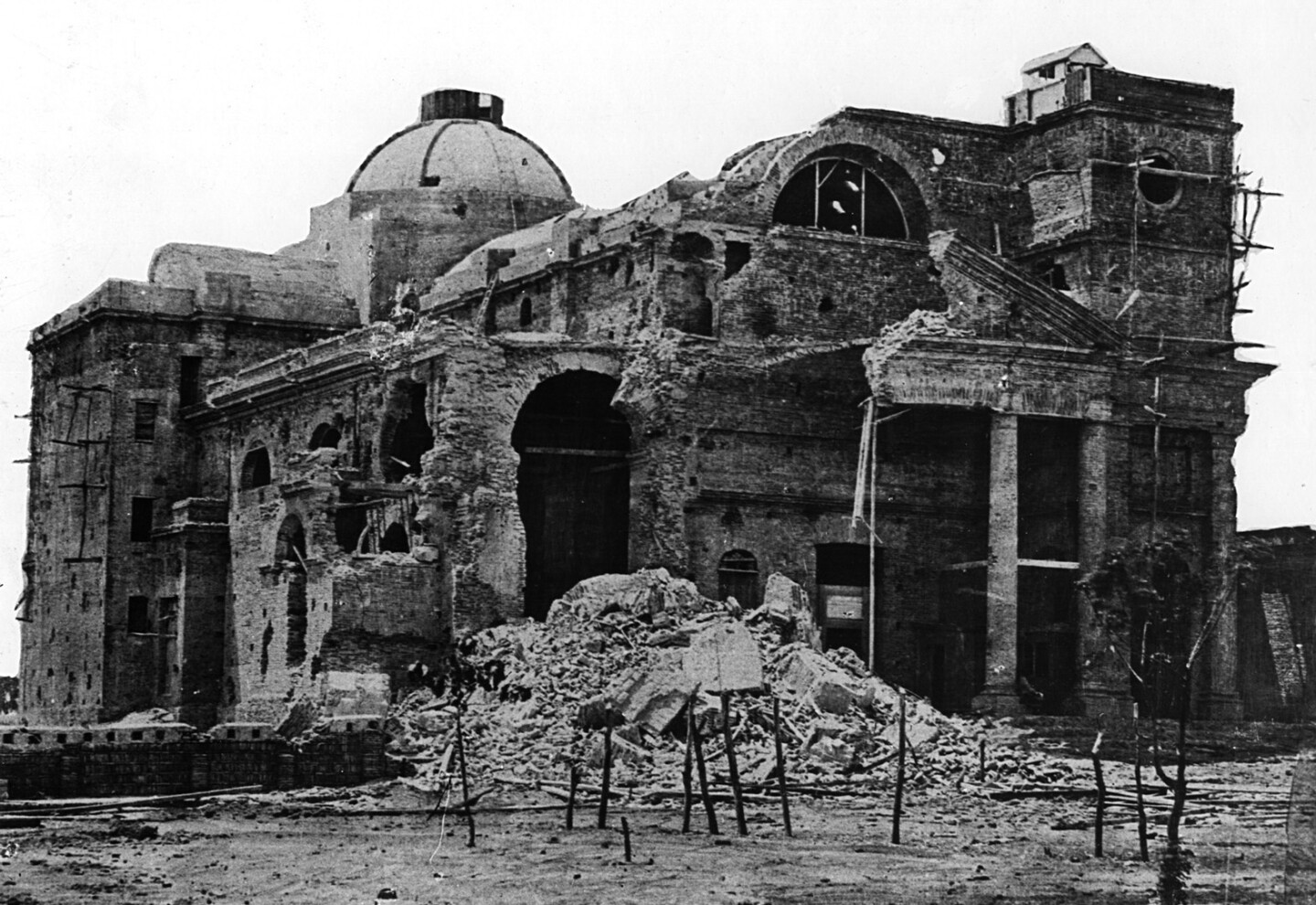
Church of Paysandú at the end of the siege

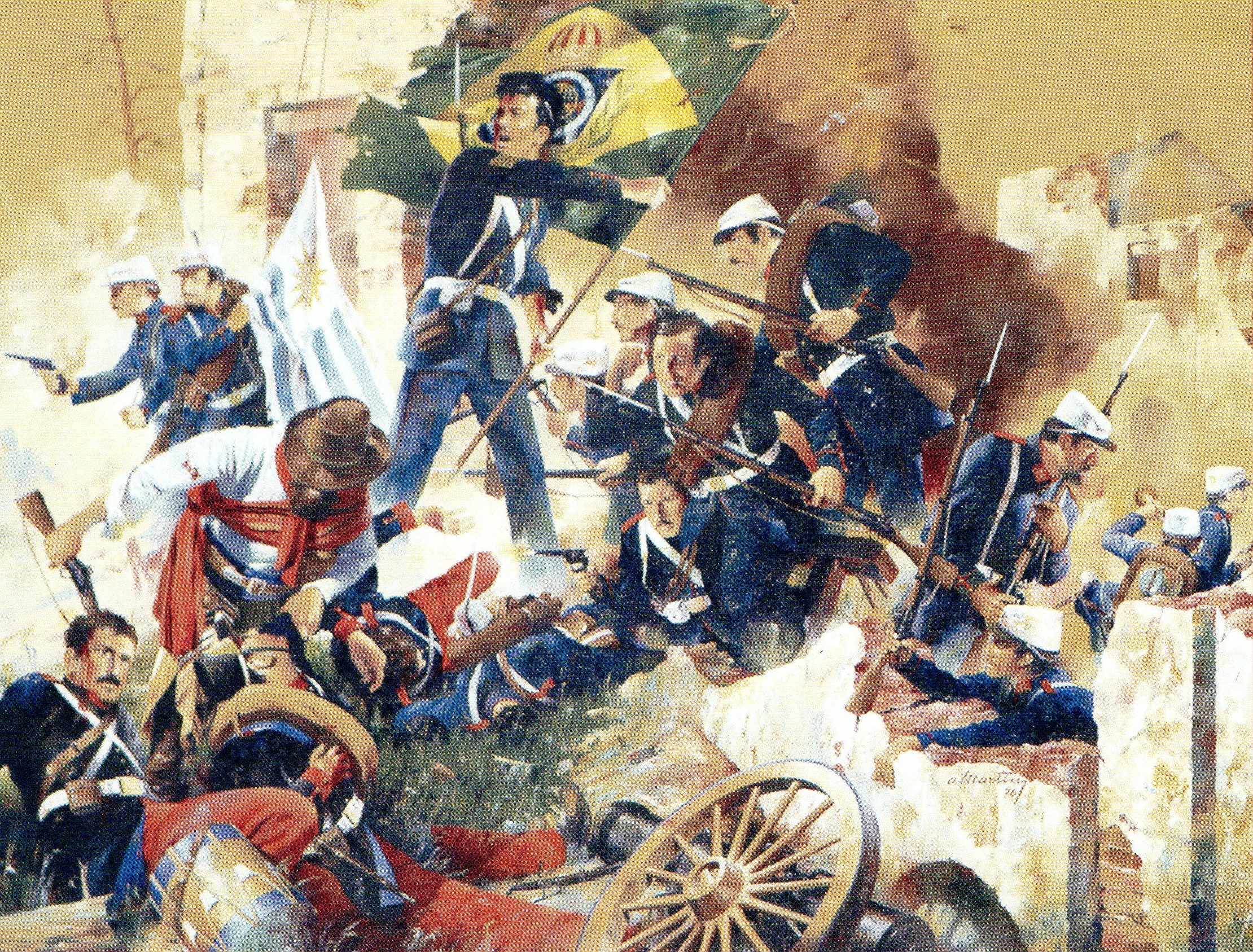
1976 painting of the Brazilian assault on Fort Sebastopol during the battle by Álvaro Martins

== Aftermath ==
The Brazilians captured Gómez and handed him over to the Colorados. Colonel Gregorio "Goyo" Suárez shot Gómez and three of his officers. "Suárez's actions were not really unexpected, as several members of his immediate family had fallen victim to Gómez's wrath against the Colorados."

The Church of Paysandú was severely damaged at the end of the siege.

== Bibliography ==
- Barroso, Gustavo (1935). História Militar do Brasil (in Portuguese). São Paulo: Companhia Editora Nacional.
- Bethell, Leslie (1985). The Cambridge History of Latin America. Vol. 3. Cambridge: Cambridge University Press. ISBN 0-521-23224-4.
- Bormann, José Bernardino (1907). A Campanha do Uruguay (1864–65) (in Portuguese). Rio de Janeiro: Imprensa Nacional.
- Carvalho, José Murilo de (2007). D. Pedro II: Ser ou Não Ser (in Portuguese). São Paulo: Companhia das Letras. ISBN 978-85-359-0969-2.
- Costa, Wilma Peres (1996). A Espada de Dâmocles: o Exército, a Guerra do Paraguai e a Crise do Império (in Portuguese). São Paulo: HUCITEC. ISBN 85-271-0245-5.
- Golin, Tau (2004). A Fronteira (in Portuguese). Vol. 2. Porto Alegre: L&PM. ISBN 978-85-254-1438-0.
- Graham, Robert Bontine Cunninghame (1933). Portrait of a Dictator. London: William Heinemann.
- Hooker, Terry D. (2008). The Paraguayan War. Nottingham: Foundry Books. ISBN 978-1-901543-15-5.
- Kraay, Hendrik; Whigham, Thomas L. (2004). I Die with My Country: Perspectives on the Paraguayan War, 1864–1870. Dexter, Michigan: Thomson-Shore. ISBN 978-0-8032-2762-0.
- Leuchars, Chris (2002). To the Bitter End: Paraguay and the War of the Triple Alliance. Westport, Connecticut: Greenwood Press. ISBN 0-313-32365-8.
- Maia, Prado (1975). A Marinha de Guerra do Brasil na Colônia e no Império (in Portuguese) (2 ed.). Rio de Janeiro: Cátedra.
- Munro, Dana Gardner (1960). The Latin American Republics: A History (3 ed.). New York: Appleton-Century-Crofts.
- Needell, Jeffrey D. (2006). The Party of Order: the Conservatives, the State, and Slavery in the Brazilian Monarchy, 1831–1871. Stanford, California: Stanford University Press. ISBN 978-0-8047-5369-2.
- Osório, Joaquim Luís; Osório, Fernando Luís (1915). História do General Osório (in Portuguese). Vol. 1. Pelotas: Tipografia do Diário Popular.
- Raine, Philip (1956). Paraguay. New Brunswick, New Jersey: Scarecrow Press.
- Schneider, Louis (2009). A Guerra da Tríplice Aliança Contra o Paraguai (in Portuguese). Porto Alegre: Pradense. ISBN 978-85-89072-13-7.
- Silva, Alfredo Pretextato Maciel da (1906b). Os Generais do Exército Brasileiro de 1822 a 1889: Traços Biográficos (in Portuguese). Vol. 2. Rio de Janeiro: M. Orosco & C.
- Tasso Fragoso, Augusto (2009). História da Guerra entre a Tríplice Aliança e o Paraguai (in Portuguese). Vol. 1 (3 ed.). Rio de Janeiro: Biblioteca do Exército.
- Williams, Mary Wilhelmine (1937). Dom Pedro the Magnanimous, Second Emperor of Brazil. Chapel Hill, North Carolina: University of North Carolina Press.
- Whigham, Thomas L. (2002). The Paraguayan War: Causes and Early Conduct. Vol. 1. Lincoln, Nebraska: University of Nebraska Press. ISBN 978-0-8032-4786-4.
- Alves, J. V. Portella Ferreira. Mallet, o Patrono da Artilharia. Rio de Janeiro: Biblioteca do Exército, 1979. (in Portuguese)
- Maia, João do Prado. A Marinha de Guerra do Brasil na Colônia e no Império. 2 ed. Rio de Janeiro: Livraria Editora Cátedra, 1975. (in Portuguese)
