= Memory of Fire =

Book trilogy by Eduardo Galeano

- Title page for Memoria del fuego (1982)
- Author: Eduardo Galeano
- Original title: Memoria del fuego
- Translator: Cedric Belfrage
- Language: Spanish
- Subject: History of Latin America
- Publisher: Nation Books
- Publication date: 1982
- Publication place: Uruguay
- English publication date: 1982 (1st edition); 2010
- Media type: Print
- Pages: xv, 336 p.
- ISBN: 978-1-56858-444-7

Memory of Fire (Spanish: Memoria del fuego) is a trilogy written by Uruguayan writer Eduardo Galeano.

Published between 1982 and 1986, it consists of the titles Genesis (1982), Faces and Masks (1984) and The Century of the Wind (1986). It is a rewritten history of the Americas since the days of creation myths to the 21st century.

== Content ==
The trilogy covers the history of the Americas from creation myths to 1982. Galeano stated the work was written while he lived in Spain during the military dictatorships in Uruguay and Argentina. In 1983, he expressed concern that his previous work, Open Veins, focused on economics rather than a broader range of human experiences. The trilogy includes accounts of natural resource extraction and the aspirations of people in the Western Hemisphere.

The volumes of the trilogy are arranged chronologically:

- Genesis: from the creation of the world to the 17th century.
- Faces and Masks: 18th and 19th centuries.
- Century of the Wind: 20th century.

The text is composed of a series of short stories, each less than a page long. The stories are written in prose, some of them in poetic prose:

"Before, the winds blew incessantly over Vancouver Island. There was no such thing as good weather or low tide. Men decided to kill the winds."

— Eduardo Galeano, Genesis
