= Carlos Quijano =

Uruguayan lawyer, politician, essayist, and journalist

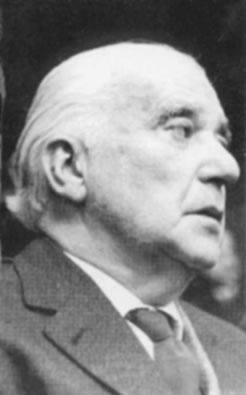

Carlos Quijano (Montevideo, 21 March 1900 - Mexico, 10 June 1984) was a Uruguayan lawyer, politician, essayist and journalist.

He is especially remembered as the founder of the weekly newspaper Marcha.
