= Ricardo Armentano =

Uruguayan professor and researcher (born 1957)

Ricardo Luis Armentano Feijoo (born 3 August 1957) is an Uruguayan professor and researcher who has worked in biomedical engineering and cardiovascular systems. He is the director of the GIBIO research group at the National Technological University — Buenos Aires Regional Faculty (Argentina). He is also the director of the Department of Biological Engineering, University of the Republic (Uruguay). He has two doctoral degrees, two post-doctoral degrees, and has authored more than 300 research articles and 20 books/book chapters.

Armentano has worked in the field of Engineering in Biology and Medicine from its theoretical fundamentals to its application in clinical practice.

== Academic career ==
In December 2004, he was selected as researcher class 1 by the Ministry of Education, Culture and Technology of the República Argentina. In October 2005 he was designated Director of the PhD program on signal processing of the National Technological University of Buenos Aires. In 2008 he has been honored with a senior fellowship of the Ville de Paris for French post doctoral researchers in Paris city laboratories supervised by Prof. Alain Simon. Professor Armentano is a visiting professor at Institut Jean le Rond d'Alembert Université Pierre et Marie Curie, Paris France and at the Politechnic University, Madrid Spain. He has been elected Co-Chair Global of the Citizen Safety and Security working group of the International Federation for Medical and Biological Engineering (IFMBE).

== IEEE Society career ==
Armentano is a member of the Engineering in Medicine and Biology Society of the Institute of Electrical and Electronics Engineers (IEEE) since 1985. In 2001 he was elected as a Senior Member of the IEEE and In December 2004 he was appointed chair of the Argentinean Chapter of the EMBS, IEEE. He was the conference chair of the 32nd International Conference EMBS/IEEE Buenos Aires 2010. He was a member of the International Program Committee in the 31st Annual International Conference of IEEE Engineering in Medicine and Biology Society, member of the International Program Committee for the 34 IEEE Engineering in Medicine and Biology Conference (EMBC'12) and member of the Conference Organization Advisory Board of the 33rd IEEE Engineering in Medicine and Biology Conference. He served at IEEE Corporate - Awards as a member in the 2015 IEEE Healthcare Technology Medal Committee and in 2015 IEEE Biomedical Engineering Award Committee. He was served as the AdCom 2015 EMBS IEEE Latin America Officer.

He has been President of the Argentine Society of Bioengineering and Argentine delegate in the Latin American Regional Council on Biomedical Engineering (CORAL), an organization co-sponsored by IEEE/EMBS and IFMBE. He chaired the XII Argentine Congress of Bioengineering SABI/EMBS Chapter in Buenos Aires city. He is a member of the IEEE Society on Social Implications of Technology since 2010.

Armentano is the Vice President of the Argentine Chapter of IEEE Society of Social Implications of Technology (SSIT) (2017). He is a member of EMBS IEEE Technical Committee on Cardiopulmonary Systems (2017). Currently he is a distinguished lecturer of the IEEE-EMBS.
