= Uruguay–European Union relations =

- European Union: Uruguay

Uruguay and the European Union have close historical, cultural, economic and political ties.

The EU and Uruguay signed the Framework Cooperation Agreement in 1992 to promote bilateral relations with the aim of increasing cooperation with regard to trade, finance and technology, among other things.

The EU is Uruguay's third-biggest trade partner; flows of capital and direct investment from Europe to Uruguay have been growing. Companies such as UPM (cellulose), Montes del Plata (cellulose), Katoen Natie (logistics/port operations), Glencore (agriculture), Sofitel (tourism), Bayer (pharmaceuticals), Banco Santander, BBVA (banking) and Movistar (telecommunications), among others, are active participants in Uruguay's economy.

== Uruguay's foreign relations with EU member states ==
- Austria
- Belgium
- Bulgaria
- Croatia
- Cyprus
- Czech Republic
- Denmark
- Estonia
- Finland
- France
- Germany
- Greece
- Hungary
- (Republic of Ireland) Ireland
- Italy
- Latvia
- Lithuania
- Luxembourg
- Malta
- Netherlands
- Poland
- Portugal
- Romania
- Slovakia
- Slovenia
- Spain
- Sweden

== See also ==
- Foreign relations of the European Union
- Foreign relations of Uruguay
