= Foreign relations of Uruguay =

This article deals with the diplomatic affairs, foreign policy and international relations of Uruguay. At the political level, these matters are officially handled by the Ministry of Foreign Relations, also known as Cancillería, which answers to the President.

== Overview ==
Uruguay traditionally has had strong political and cultural links with its neighbours and Europe. British diplomat Alfred Mitchell-Innes was Minister to Uruguay throughout the crucial years of World War I (1913–1919).

With globalization and regional economic problems, its links to North America have strengthened. Uruguay is a strong advocate of constitutional democracy, political pluralism, and individual liberties. Its international relations historically have been guided by the principles of nonintervention, multilateralism, respect for national sovereignty, and reliance on the rule of law to settle disputes. Uruguay's international relations also reflect its drive to seek export markets and foreign investment. It is a founding member of MERCOSUR. In June 1991, MERCOSUR and the United States signed the Rose Garden Agreement (also known as the "Four Plus One" Agreement). The agreement was non-operational until June 2001 when MERCOSUR invited the U.S. to discuss the feasibility of market access negotiations. The first U.S.-MERCOSUR meeting was held on September 24, 2001, and resulted in the creation of four working groups on industrial trade, e-commerce, agriculture, and investment.

Uruguay was a member of the Rio Group, an association of Latin American states that deals with multilateral security issues (under the Inter-American Treaty of Reciprocal Assistance), prior to the group's dissolution in 2011. Uruguay's location between Argentina and Brazil makes close relations with these two larger neighbors and MERCOSUR associate members Chile and Bolivia particularly important. An early proponent of the Enterprise for the Americas Initiative, Uruguay has actively participated in the follow-up process to the periodic Summits of the Americas, especially the Free Trade Area of the Americas (FTAA). Often considered a neutral country and blessed with a professional diplomatic corps, Uruguay is often called on to preside international bodies. Most recently, Uruguay was selected to chair the FTAA and WTO agricultural committees and a Uruguayan presides over the WTO General Assembly. Uruguay also is a member of the Latin American Integration Association (ALADI), a trade association based in Montevideo that includes 10 South American countries plus Mexico and Cuba.

In 2020, the new right-wing president of Uruguay, Luis Lacalle Pou, announced that he will implement radical changes in Uruguay's foreign policy, taking a harder attitude against disputed President Nicolas Maduro's regime in Venezuela and improving relations with the U.S. The previous left-wing government of Uruguay had recognized Maduro as Venezuela's president. President Luis Lacalle Pou also declared the presidents of Venezuela and Cuba to be "dictators."

Disputes - international: Uncontested disputes with Brazil over tiny Isla Brasilera at the mouth of the Quarai/Cuareim River near the Argentina tripoint, and, 225 kilometers upriver, over the 235 km^{2}. Invernada River region, as to which tributary is the legitimate source of the Quarai/Cuareim River.

In the 1960s, the US Office of Public Safety helped in training Uruguayan police officers. Dan Mitrione taught torture methods used against the civilian population and the Tupamaros.

== Diplomatic relations ==
List of countries which Uruguay maintains diplomatic relations with:

#	Country	Date
1	Argentina	29 September 1829
2	Brazil	29 September 1829
3	Mexico	22 February 1831
4	United Kingdom	21 February 1833
5	France	8 April 1836
6	Denmark	28 February 1842
7	Bolivia	1 November 1843
8	Chile	1 November 1843
9	Paraguay	1 January 1846
10	Portugal	14 February 1846
11	Belgium	30 April 1853
12	Russia	10 December 1857
13	Peru	16 May 1862
14	Italy	13 August 1862
15	United States	2 October 1867
16	Spain	19 July 1870
—	Holy See	31 December 1877
17	Ecuador	15 December 1887
18	Colombia	25 August 1888
19	Venezuela	27 May 1891
20	Switzerland	8 April 1892
21	Netherlands	15 April 1896
22	Cuba	1 September 1902
23	Serbia	19 February 1904
24	Panama	28 October 1904
25	Norway	3 April 1906
26	Sweden	6 August 1906
27	Guatemala	16 March 1907
28	Greece	19 April 1920
29	Austria	30 June 1920
30	Poland	22 July 1920
31	Czech Republic	16 August 1921
32	Japan	24 September 1921
33	Dominican Republic	27 November 1925
34	El Salvador	11 January 1929
35	Honduras	11 January 1929
36	Nicaragua	11 January 1929
37	Costa Rica	16 January 1930
38	Egypt	25 February 1932
39	Albania	23 April 1932
40	Turkey	8 December 1933
41	Luxembourg	6 January 1934
42	Finland	21 March 1935
43	Romania	24 July 1935
44	Haiti	5 September 1945
45	Lebanon	25 October 1945
46	Syria	11 October 1946
47	Canada	11 March 1948
48	Israel	19 May 1948
49	India	5 November 1948
50	Australia	15 December 1948
51	Germany	9 January 1952
52	Hungary	14 June 1956
53	Bulgaria	6 August 1958
54	New Zealand	27 September 1962
55	Morocco	20 December 1962
56	Algeria	21 August 1964
57	South Korea	7 October 1964
58	Pakistan	1964
59	Nigeria	20 February 1965
—	Sovereign Military Order of Malta	1 July 1965
60	Tunisia	16 September 1965
61	Trinidad and Tobago	22 November 1965
62	Cyprus	24 November 1965
63	Indonesia	9 June 1966
64	Barbados	6 December 1967
65	South Africa	22 April 1968
66	Saudi Arabia	9 July 1974
67	Malta	13 October 1975
68	Iran	25 November 1975
69	Philippines	29 December 1975
70	Thailand	15 June 1976
71	Senegal	8 May 1978
72	Suriname	9 March 1979
73	United Arab Emirates	8 April 1980
74	Kuwait	1980
75	Equatorial Guinea	7 September 1981
76	Iraq	13 October 1981
77	Ghana	24 May 1982
78	Gabon	14 June 1982
79	Kenya	20 July 1982
80	Bahamas	25 November 1982
81	Democratic Republic of the Congo	31 March 1984
82	Ivory Coast	1 September 1984
83	Jamaica	23 May 1985
84	Guyana	3 June 1985
85	Saint Vincent and the Grenadines	13 June 1985
86	Grenada	20 September 1985
87	Jordan	14 January 1987
88	Angola	6 March 1987
89	Qatar	16 March 1987
90	Tanzania	1 April 1987
91	Oman	6 April 1987
92	Antigua and Barbuda	27 April 1987
94	Bangladesh	15 July 1987
94	Saint Kitts and Nevis	15 July 1987
95	Singapore	15 September 1987
96	Republic of the Congo	22 September 1987
97	Belize	28 September 1987
98	Malaysia	5 January 1988
99	China	3 February 1988
100	Papua New Guinea	20 October 1988
101	Central African Republic	14 March 1989
102	Mauritania	23 March 1989
103	Saint Lucia	1 September 1989
104	São Tomé and Príncipe	26 September 1990
105	Afghanistan	4 October 1990
106	Iceland	18 June 1991
107	Libya	4 October 1991
108	Ukraine	18 May 1992
109	Armenia	27 May 1992
110	Latvia	6 July 1992
111	Belarus	7 July 1992
112	Estonia	30 September 1992
113	Slovakia	1 January 1993
114	Lithuania	8 March 1993
115	Slovenia	26 April 1993
116	Croatia	4 May 1993
117	Kazakhstan	30 July 1993
118	Vietnam	11 August 1993
119	Kyrgyzstan	13 August 1993
120	Liechtenstein	24 September 1993
121	Mozambique	1 October 1993
122	Georgia	11 May 1994
123	Namibia	13 September 1994
124	Brunei	19 September 1994
125	Cambodia	29 September 1994
126	Azerbaijan	11 January 1995
127	Bahrain	25 May 1995
128	Bosnia and Herzegovina	28 September 1995
129	Ireland	16 February 1996
130	Moldova	14 May 1996
131	Turkmenistan	16 July 1996
132	Fiji	17 September 1996
133	Andorra	27 November 1996
134	Mongolia	7 October 1997
135	Uzbekistan	25 May 1998
136	Lesotho	26 May 1998
137	Tajikistan	1 October 1998
138	Zimbabwe	9 April 1999
139	Sri Lanka	21 July 1999
140	San Marino	22 September 1999
141	Myanmar	22 February 2001
142	Monaco	10 April 2001
143	North Macedonia	17 May 2002
—	Sahrawi Arab Democratic Republic	26 December 2005
144	Botswana	4 May 2007
145	Liberia	1 June 2007
146	Guinea	19 June 2007
147	Burkina Faso	28 August 2007
148	Madagascar	29 August 2007
149	Gambia	25 September 2007
150	Togo	28 September 2007
151	Djibouti	12 February 2008
152	Benin	14 February 2008
153	Timor-Leste	23 September 2008
154	Seychelles	12 November 2008
155	Maldives	24 February 2009
156	Montenegro	25 February 2009
157	Comoros	14 May 2009
158	Rwanda	16 June 2009
159	Vanuatu	6 August 2009
160	Marshall Islands	2 December 2009
161	Guinea-Bissau	26 March 2010
162	Sierra Leone	22 September 2010
163	Solomon Islands	4 February 2011
164	Dominica	25 February 2011
165	Nauru	14 March 2011
166	Ethiopia	23 March 2011
—	State of Palestine	29 March 2011
167	Tuvalu	9 September 2011
168	Nepal	18 April 2012
169	Niger	6 March 2013
170	Samoa	21 March 2013
171	Federated States of Micronesia	5 September 2013
172	Cape Verde	10 September 2013
173	Cameroon	18 December 2017
174	Mauritius	15 May 2019
175	Tonga	14 March 2024
176	Laos	19 September 2024
177	Burundi	15 May 2026
178	Uganda	26 May 2026
179	Zambia	21 September 2026
180	Malawi	25 September 2026
181	Mali	Unknown

== Bilateral relations ==
=== Africa ===
Country	Formal Relations Began	Notes
Angola		See Angola–Uruguay relations
Democratic Republic of the Congo	31 March 1984	See Democratic Republic of the Congo–Uruguay relations In December 2021, President Luis Lacalle Pou paid a visit to Bukavu and Goma and visited with Uruguayan soldiers stationed there as part of MONUSCO in Eastern DR Congo.: DR Congo is accredited to Uruguay from its embassy in Buenos Aires, Argentina.
Egypt		See Egypt–Uruguay relations: Egypt has an embassy in Montevideo.; Uruguay has an embassy in Cairo and an honorary consulate in Alexandria.
South Africa		See South Africa–Uruguay relations: South Africa is accredited to Uruguay from its embassy in Buenos Aires, Argentina.; Uruguay has an embassy in Pretoria.

=== Americas ===
Country	Formal Relations Began	Notes
Argentina	20 July 1811	See Argentina–Uruguay relations
Bolivia		See Bolivia–Uruguay relations
Brazil		See Brazil–Uruguay relations: Brazil and Uruguay are neighboring countries that share close historical, cultural and geographical ties. The singularity of the bilateral relationship between the two countries originates from the strong historical connection - marked by important events, such as the establishment of the Colônia do Sacramento in 1680, the annexation by Brazil and the subsequent creation of the Província Cisplatina in 1815, and Uruguay's independence from Brazil in 1828.
Canada	1953	See Canada–Uruguay relations: Canada has an embassy in Montevideo.; Uruguay has an embassy in Ottawa, two consulates general in Montreal and Toronto, and an honorary consulate in Vancouver.; Total bilateral merchandise trade between Canada and Uruguay reached $202 million, with Uruguay maintaining a $9.8 million trade surplus. Canadian exports to Uruguay totaled $91.6 million
Chile		See Chile–Uruguay relations: Chile has an embassy in Montevideo.; Uruguay has an embassy in Santiago, Chile; In 2024, bilateral trade between Uruguay and Chile favored Uruguay, which recorded a $52.8 million trade surplus with $217 million in exports, led by wheat ($27.2M) and $164 million in imports, primarily consisting of fish fillets ($10.8M).
Colombia		See Colombia–Uruguay relations: Colombia has an embassy in Montevideo.; Uruguay has an embassy in Bogota; Total bilateral trade between Colombia and Uruguay reached $130.1 million, with Uruguay maintaining a $58.5 million trade surplus. Uruguayan exports to Colombia totaled $94.3 million.
Costa Rica		See Costa Rica–Uruguay relations
Cuba		See Cuba–Uruguay relations
Dominican Republic		See Dominican Republic–Uruguay relations
Ecuador		See Ecuador–Uruguay relations
El Salvador		See El Salvador–Uruguay relations
Guatemala		See Guatemala–Uruguay relations
Honduras		See Honduras–Uruguay relations
Mexico	22 February 1831	See Mexico–Uruguay relations: Mexico has an embassy in Montevideo.; Uruguay has an embassy in Mexico City.; On July 15, 2004, both nations signed a Free Trade Agreement with each other.; In 2024, bilateral trade between Mexico and Uruguay totaled US$449 million, with Mexico exporting $221 million (led by delivery trucks at $36.5 million and cars at $35.5 million) and importing $228 million (led by sulfate chemical woodpulp at $57.5 million and rice at $33.8 million), resulting in a $7.19 million trade deficit for Mexico; in May 2026, monthly trade saw Mexico export $12.2 million and import $37.6 million from Uruguay.
Nicaragua		See Nicaragua–Uruguay relations
Panama		See Panama–Uruguay relations
Paraguay		See Paraguay–Uruguay relations
Peru		See Peru–Uruguay relations: Peru has an embassy in Montevideo.; Uruguay has an embassy in Lima.
United States		See United States–Uruguay relations
Venezuela		See Uruguay–Venezuela relations

=== Asia ===
Country	Formal Relations Began	Notes
Armenia	27 May 1992	See Armenia–Uruguay relations: In May 2022, the two countries agreed to open embassies in each other's countries; Yerevan and Montevideo.
Azerbaijan	11 January 1995	See Azerbaijan–Uruguay relations: Azerbajian is concurrently accredited to Uruguay from its embassy in Buenos Aires
Bangladesh	1972	See Bangladesh–Uruguay relations
China	1988	See China–Uruguay relations
India		See India–Uruguay relations: India is concurrently accredited to Uruguay from its embassy in Buenos Aires, alongside an honorary consulate in Montevideo.; Uruguay maintains an embassy in New Delhi and an honorary consulate in Mumbai.; Bilateral commercial ties operate under the India–MERCOSUR Preferential Trade Agreement.
Iran		See Iran–Uruguay relations
Israel		See Israel–Uruguay relations: Israel has an embassy in Montevideo.; Uruguay has an embassy in Tel Aviv and two honorary consulates in Ashdod and Haifa.; Uruguay was one of the first nations to recognize Israel as independent.
Japan	September 1921	See Japan–Uruguay relations: Japan has an embassy in Montevideo.
Lebanon	25 October 1945	See Lebanon–Uruguay relations: Lebanon has an embassy in Montevideo.; Uruguay has an embassy in Beirut.; Uruguay is home to a significant Lebanese diaspora of between 53,000 and 70,000 people.
Malaysia		See Malaysia–Uruguay relations
Pakistan		In 2006 a commercial agreement was celebrated between Pakistan and Mercosur (a trade bloc of which Uruguay is part). There is a Pakistan-Uruguay Chamber of Commerce. *When war broke out in East Pakistan in 1971, Uruguay initially hesistated to take sides. However, on August 24, 1971, Uruguay recognized Bangladesh (hithero East Pakistan) as an independent state.; In 2007 Montevideo hosted the first 'International Kashmir Conference'. The Prime Minister of Azad Jammu and Kashmir Sardar Attique Ahmed Khan took part in the event, which was co-organized by the Catholic University of Uruguay. Khan met with a number of Uruguayan senators during his stay.
Palestine		See Palestine–Uruguay relations: Palestine has an embassy in Montevideo.; Uruguay has an embassy in Ramallah.; Uruguay officially recognized the State of Palestine on 15 March 2011.
South Korea	7 October 1964	See South Korea–Uruguay relations: South Korea has an embassy in Montevideo.; Uruguay has an embassy in Seoul .; A bilateral investment treaty between Uruguay and South Korea was signed on October 1, 2009, in Montevideo and approved by Uruguay under Law No. 18.825 of October 21, 2011, establishes mutual investment promotion and protection standards which includingnational and most-favored-nation treatment, fair and equitable treatment, compensation for expropriation or losses, free transfer of funds, and investor–state arbitration mechanisms.; In 2024, bilateral trade between Uruguay and South Korea resulted in a $26.3 million trade surplus for Uruguay. During this period, Uruguayan exports to South Korea reached $186 million, while imports from South Korea totaled $160 million.
Turkey	1929	See Turkey–Uruguay relations: Turkey has an embassy in Montevideo.; Uruguay has an embassy in Ankara and a consulate-general in Istanbul.; Trade volume between the two countries was US$341.4 million in 2019 (Uruguay's exports/imports: 298.6/42.8 million USD).
United Arab Emirates	8 April 1980	Uruguay maintains a resident embassy in Abu Dhabi.; The United Arab Emirates is accredited to Uruguay through its embassy in Buenos Aires, Argentina.; In 2024, bilateral trade between the United Arab Emirates and Uruguay resulted in a $13 million trade surplus for the United Arab Emirates. During this period, Emirati exports to Uruguay reached $34.8 million, while imports from Uruguay totaled $21.8 million.; In January 2026, UAE Minister of State for International Cooperation Reem Al Hashimy visited Uruguay, accompanied by Non-Resident Ambassador Saeed Abdullah Al Qamzi, in which they met with President Yamandú Orsi, Vice President Carolina Cosse, Foreign Minister Mario Lubetkin, and Livestock Minister Alfredo Fratti to discuss the UAE–MERCOSUR Comprehensive Economic Partnership Agreement (CEPA).
Vietnam	11 August 1993	See Uruguay–Vietnam relations: Uruguay maintains a resident embassy in Hanoi opened in 2012.; Vietnam is concurrently accredited to Uruguay through its embassy in Buenos Aires, Argentina.

=== Europe ===
Country	Formal Relations Began	Notes
Austria		See Austria–Uruguay relations
Belgium		See Belgium–Uruguay relations
Croatia		See Croatia–Uruguay relations
Czech Republic		See Czech Republic–Uruguay relations: Czech Republic is accredited to Uruguay from its embassy in Buenos Aires, Argentina.; Uruguay is accredited to the Czech Republic from its embassy in Vienna, Austria.
Finland	21 March 1935	See Finland–Uruguay relations
France	1825	See France–Uruguay relations: France has an embassy in Montevideo.
Germany	1850	See Germany–Uruguay relations
Greece		See Greece–Uruguay relations
Holy See		See Holy See–Uruguay relations
Hungary		See Hungary–Uruguay relations
Italy	1861	See Italy–Uruguay relations: Italy has an embassy in Montevideo and four honorary consulates (in Colonia, Maldonado, Melo and Paysandú).
Netherlands		See Netherlands–Uruguay relations
Poland		See Poland–Uruguay relations
Portugal		See Portugal–Uruguay relations
Romania		See Romania–Uruguay relations
Russia		See Russia–Uruguay relations
Serbia	1950	Both countries have established diplomatic relations in September 1950. A number of bilateral agreements in various fields have been concluded and are in force between both countries.
Spain	19 July 1870	See Spain–Uruguay relations: Spain has an embassy in Montevideo.; Uruguay has an embassy in Madrid and four consulates general (in Barcelona, Las Palmas de Gran Canaria, Santiago de Compostela and Valencia) and seven honorary consulates (in Bilbao, Palma de Majorca, Pamplona, Salamanca, Santa Cruz de Tenerife, Seville and Vigo).
Sweden		See Sweden–Uruguay relations
Switzerland	1828	See Switzerland–Uruguay relations Both countries share a long history of mutual economic relations, and they established diplomatic relations in 1828. In the twentieth century, Uruguay has looked to Switzerland as a model for government, historical and cultural ties go back to at least the nineteenth century. There are 956 people with Swiss passports residing in Uruguay in 2009. Uruguay was described as the "Switzerland of the Americas" in a 1951 New York Times article for its popularity as a haven for capital fleeing Europe at the time and its adoption of Swiss-inspired banking laws. Thomas J. Knight also wrote that "Uruguay has for most of its history been the 'Switzerland' of South America."
Ukraine		See Ukraine–Uruguay relations: Ukraine is accredited to Uruguay from its embassy in Buenos Aires (Argentina).; Uruguay is accredited to Ukraine from its embassy in Bucharest (Romania) and through an honorary consulate in Kyiv.
United Kingdom	1833	See United Kingdom–Uruguay relations British Prime Minister Boris Johnson with Uruguayan President Luis Lacalle Pou in 10 Downing Street, May 2022. Uruguay established diplomatic relations with the United Kingdom in 1833.: Uruguay maintains an embassy in London.; The United Kingdom is accredited to Uruguay through its embassy in Montevideo.; Both countries share common membership of the Atlantic Co-operation Pact, the International Criminal Court, the United Nations, the World Health Organization, and the World Trade Organization. Bilaterally the two countries have an Investment Agreement.

=== Oceania ===
Country	Formal Relations Began	Notes
Australia		See Australia–Uruguay relations

== See also ==
- List of diplomatic missions in Uruguay
- List of diplomatic missions of Uruguay
- Embassy of Uruguay in Washington
