= Holy See–Uruguay relations =

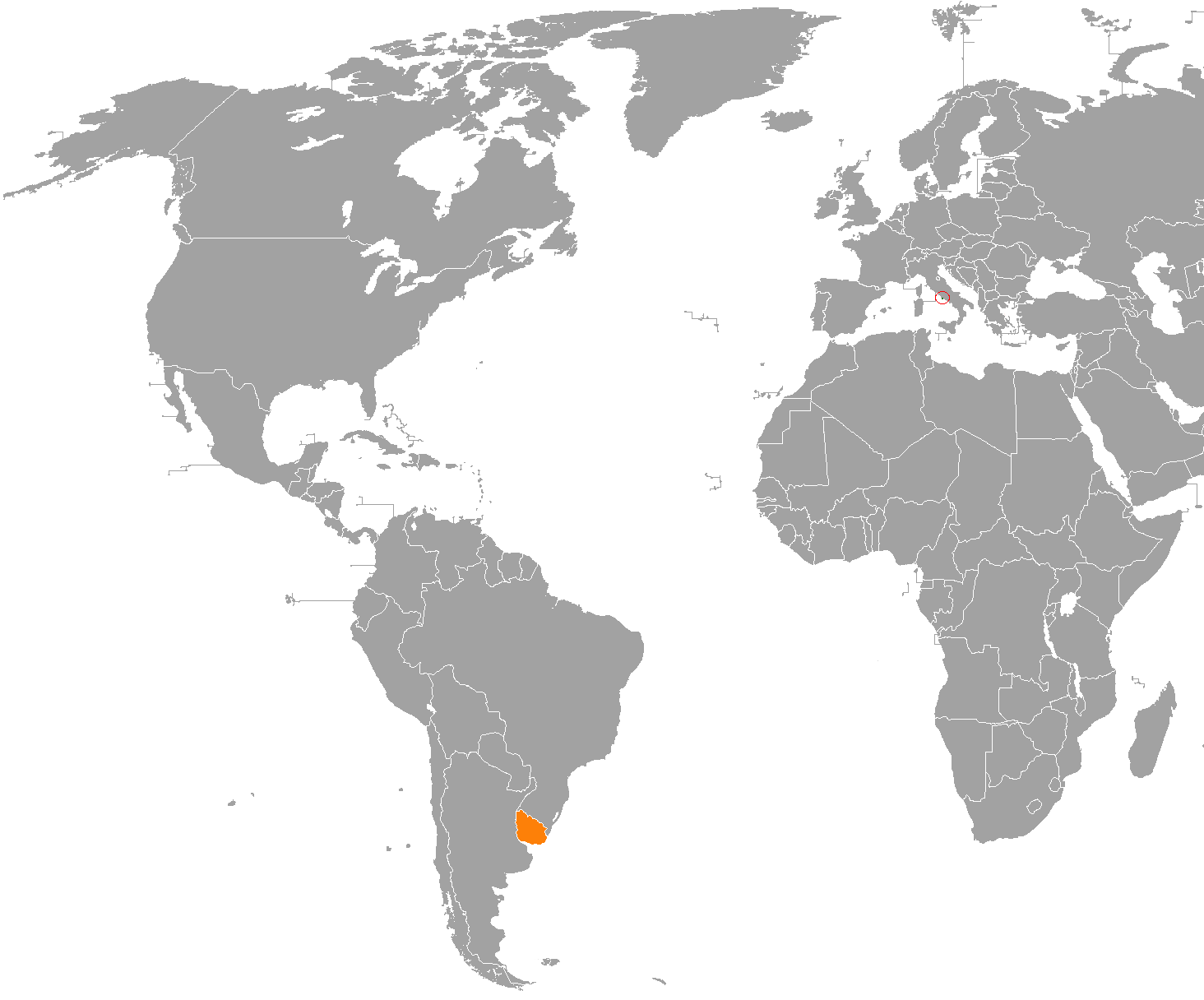
- Holy See: Uruguay

Holy See–Uruguay relations are foreign relations between the Holy See and Uruguay.

== History ==
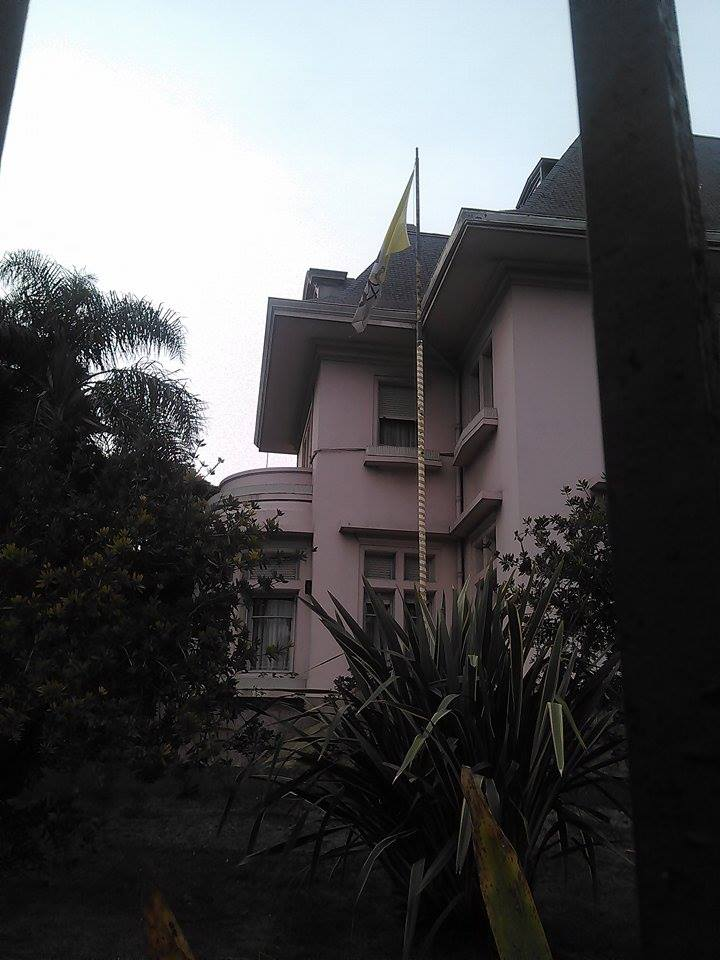
Apostolic Nunciature in Montevideo

Uruguay established diplomatic relations with the Holy See in 1856. Uruguay has an embassy to the Holy See. The Holy See has an embassy in Montevideo. The first Apostolic Delegate was Vincenzo Massoni.

Pope John Paul II made two pastoral visits. The first was in 1987 and the second in 1988.

The current Uruguayan ambassador to the Holy See is the theologian Daniel Ramada. The current Apostolic Nuncio to Uruguay is the archbishop Anselmo Guido Pecorari.

In June 2013, the Uruguayan President José Mujica made an official visit to Pope Francis. In October 2025, President Yamandú Orsi paid an official visit to Pope Leo XIV.

== See also ==
- Roman Catholicism in Uruguay

== Bibliography ==
- Berrutti, Sergio (2026). El papa en el “reino laico”. De las históricas visitas de Juan Pablo II en los años 80, a la de León XIV. Montevideo: Ediciones de la Plaza.
