= Uruguay–Vietnam relations =

Uruguay-Vietnam relations
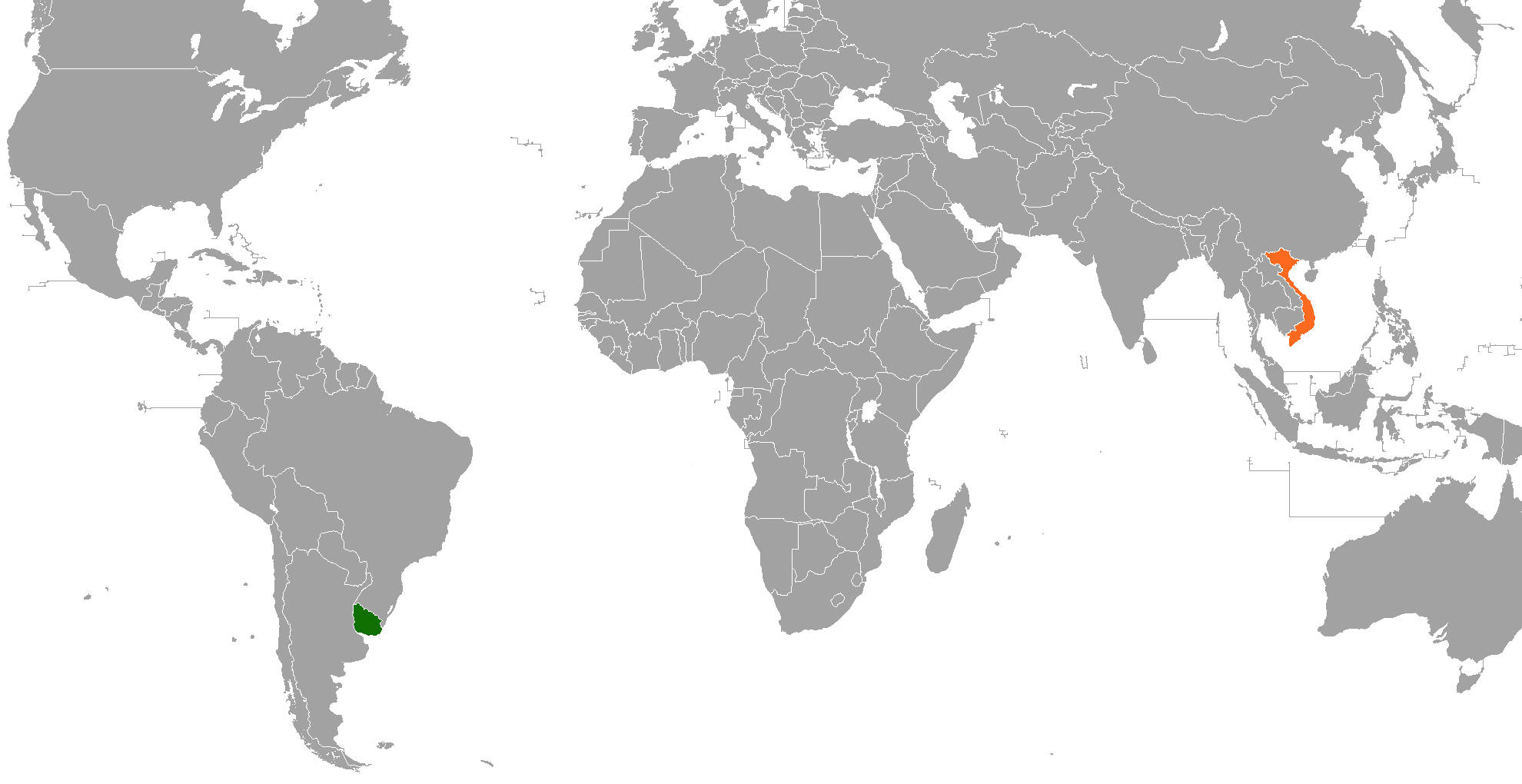
- Uruguay: Vietnam

Vietnam has an embassy in Buenos Aires, Argentina, the ambassador being concurrent to Uruguay. Uruguay has an embassy in Hanoi.

Both countries are members of the Group of 77.

== History ==
Both countries established diplomatic relations on 11 August 1993. In 2011, Uruguay opened its embassy in Hanoi.

The two countries maintain regular diplomatic engagement through high- and mid-level meetings. In July 2025, Uruguayan President Yamandú Orsi and Vietnamese Prime Minister Phạm Minh Chính met on the sidelines of the BRICS Summit in Rio de Janeiro, Brazil. In October 2026, Vietnamese Ambassador Ngô Minh Nguyệt met in Montevideo with political and legislative figures, including Broad Front (Frente Amplio) president Fernando Pereira and Senator Sebastián Da Silva of the Uruguay–Vietnam Parliamentary Friendship Group, to strengthen inter-party and inter-parliamentary relations.

== Economic relations ==
Bilateral trade is being intensely promoted. Uruguay is selling beef, historically its main export commodity, to Vietnam. In 2012, Uruguay took part in the Vietnam-Latin America Forum.In bilateral trade between Uruguay and Vietnam, Vietnam recorded a trade surplus of $58.1 million. During this period, Vietnamese exports to Uruguay reached $108 million, while imports from Uruguay totaled $50.2 million.

In 2024, bilateral trade between Vietnam and Uruguay resulted in a trade surplus of $58.1 million in favor of Vietnam, with Vietnamese exports reaching $108 million compared to $50.2 million in Uruguayan exports. Vietnam's primary exports to Uruguay consisted mainly of electronics and footwear, led by telephones ($46.3 million), textile footwear ($11.4 million), and leather footwear ($5.36 million), having grown at an annualized rate of 15.4% since 2019. Conversely, Uruguay's exports to Vietnam were dominated by forestry and livestock products, including sawn wood ($17.5 million), tanned equine and bovine hides ($10.6 million), and rough wood ($9.57 million), which expanded at an annualized rate of 4.59% over the same five-year period.

- Uruguay has an embassy in Hanoi.
- Vietnam is accredited to Uruguay from its embassy in Buenos Aires, Argentina.

== See also ==
- Foreign relations of Uruguay
- Foreign relations of Vietnam
