= Malaysia–Uruguay relations =

- Malaysia: Uruguay

Malaysia–Uruguay relations are foreign relations between Malaysia and Uruguay. Malaysia has an embassy in Buenos Aires, Argentina (with the ambassador being concurrent to Uruguay), while Uruguay has an embassy in Kuala Lumpur. Both countries are full members of the Cairns Group and of the Group of 77.

== History ==
Both countries established diplomatic relations on 5 January, 1988.

== Economic relations ==
Both countries have subscribed a bilateral trade agreement. Trade between both countries is being promoted. In 2007, the Malaysian Deputy Minister of International Trade and Industry Ng Lip Yong visited Uruguay. The same year, Uruguayan President Tabaré Vázquez made a visit to Kuala Lumpur to announce their intention to increase economic ties. An agreement of promotion and protection of investments have been signed between the two countries. Uruguay buys natural rubber from Malaysia and sells commodities, especially maize to the latter.

== Incident ==
=== Missing Malaysian jet fighter engines ===
In May 2008, two J85-GE-21 engines that power the Northrop F-5E Tiger II fighter jets belonging to the Royal Malaysian Air Force (RMAF) were reported missing. The jet engines belonged to the 12th Squadron (Scorpion) based in Butterworth. Further investigation led to the arrest of two RMAF personnel and a civilian contractor were charged in connection with the theft and disposal of both engines on 6 January 2010. On 5 February 2010, Attorney General of Malaysia revealed that the two missing engines had been found in Uruguay with the help of the Government of Uruguay and the Malaysian government is proceeding with the necessary measures to secure their return. Investigations showed that the engines were taken out of the RMAF base between 20 December 2007 to 1 January 2008 before being sent to a warehouse in Subang Jaya to be shipped out of Malaysia to South America.

== Resident diplomatic missions ==
- Malaysia is accredited to Uruguay from its embassy in Buenos Aires, Argentina.
- Uruguay has an embassy in Kuala Lumpur.

== See also ==
- Foreign relations of Malaysia
- Foreign relations of Uruguay
