= Iran–Uruguay relations =

- Iran: Uruguay

Diplomatic relations between Iran and Uruguay were established in 1983. Iran has an embassy in Montevideo. Uruguay has an embassy in Tehran.

Iran is an important trading partner for Uruguay, with important sales of rice, wool, and soybeans. The current Uruguayan government is increasing its relationship with Iran; in early 2011, Ivonne Passada, Speaker of the Chamber of Deputies of Uruguay, made an official visit to Iran, followed afterwards by Foreign Minister Luis Almagro. In early 2012, Ali Asghar Khaji, Iranian Vicechancellor for Latin America, made himself an official visit to Uruguay.

Both countries are members of the Group of 77.

== Resident diplomatic missions ==
- Iran has an embassy in Montevideo.
- Uruguay has an embassy in Tehran.

== See also ==
- Foreign relations of Iran
- Foreign relations of Uruguay
