= South Africa–Uruguay relations =

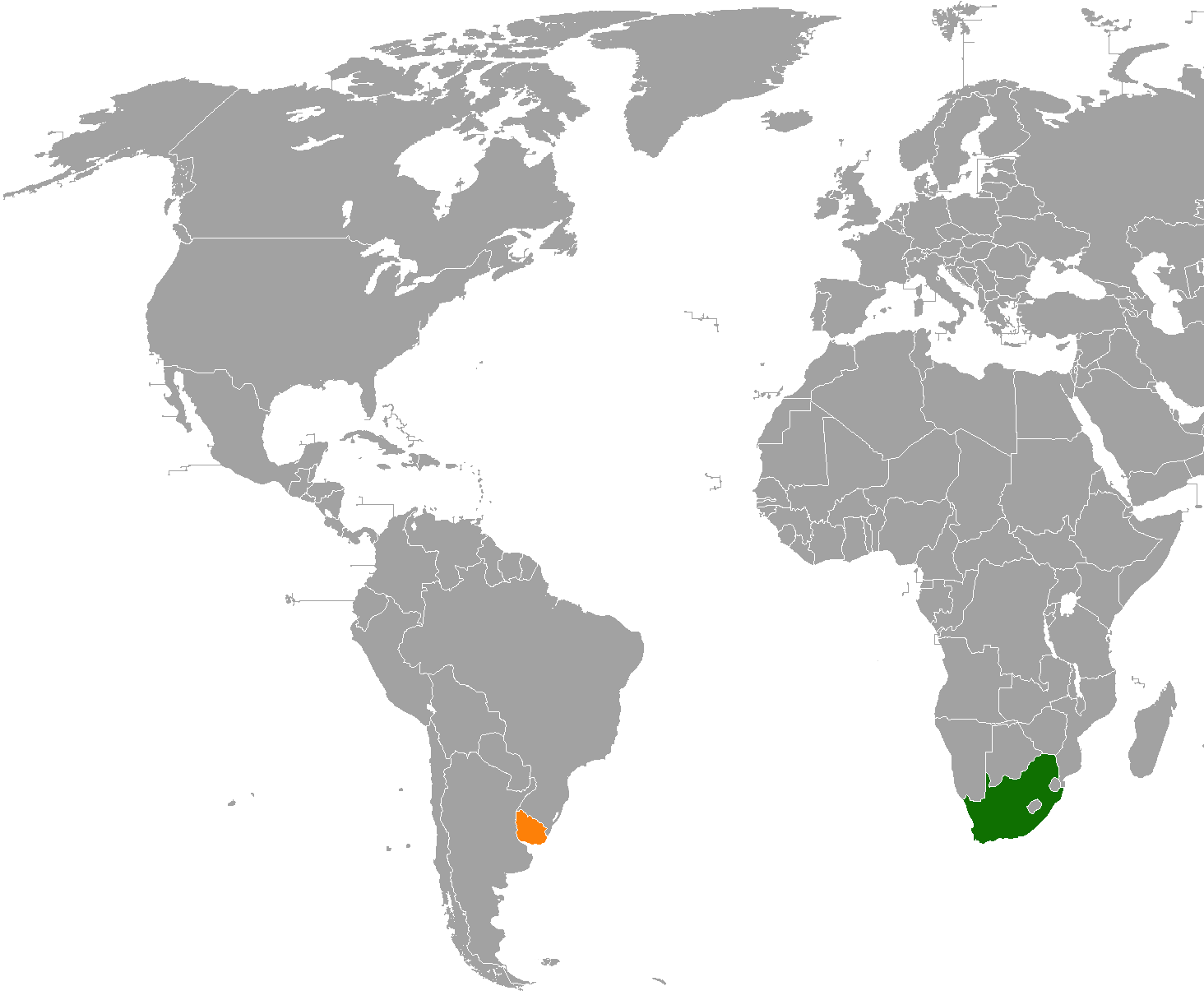
- South Africa: Uruguay

South Africa is accredited to Uruguay from its embassy in Buenos Aires, Argentina. Uruguay has an embassy in Pretoria.

Trade between both countries is very important, with Uruguay selling commodities and agroindustrial products. There is a Uruguayan-African Chamber of Commerce, covering trade between Uruguay and different African countries.

Both countries are full members of the Cairns Group and of the Group of 77.

== Resident diplomatic missions ==
- South Africa is accredited to Uruguay from its embassy in Buenos Aires, Argentina.
- Uruguay has an embassy in Pretoria.

== See also ==
- Foreign relations of South Africa
- Foreign relations of Uruguay
