= Turkey–Uruguay relations =

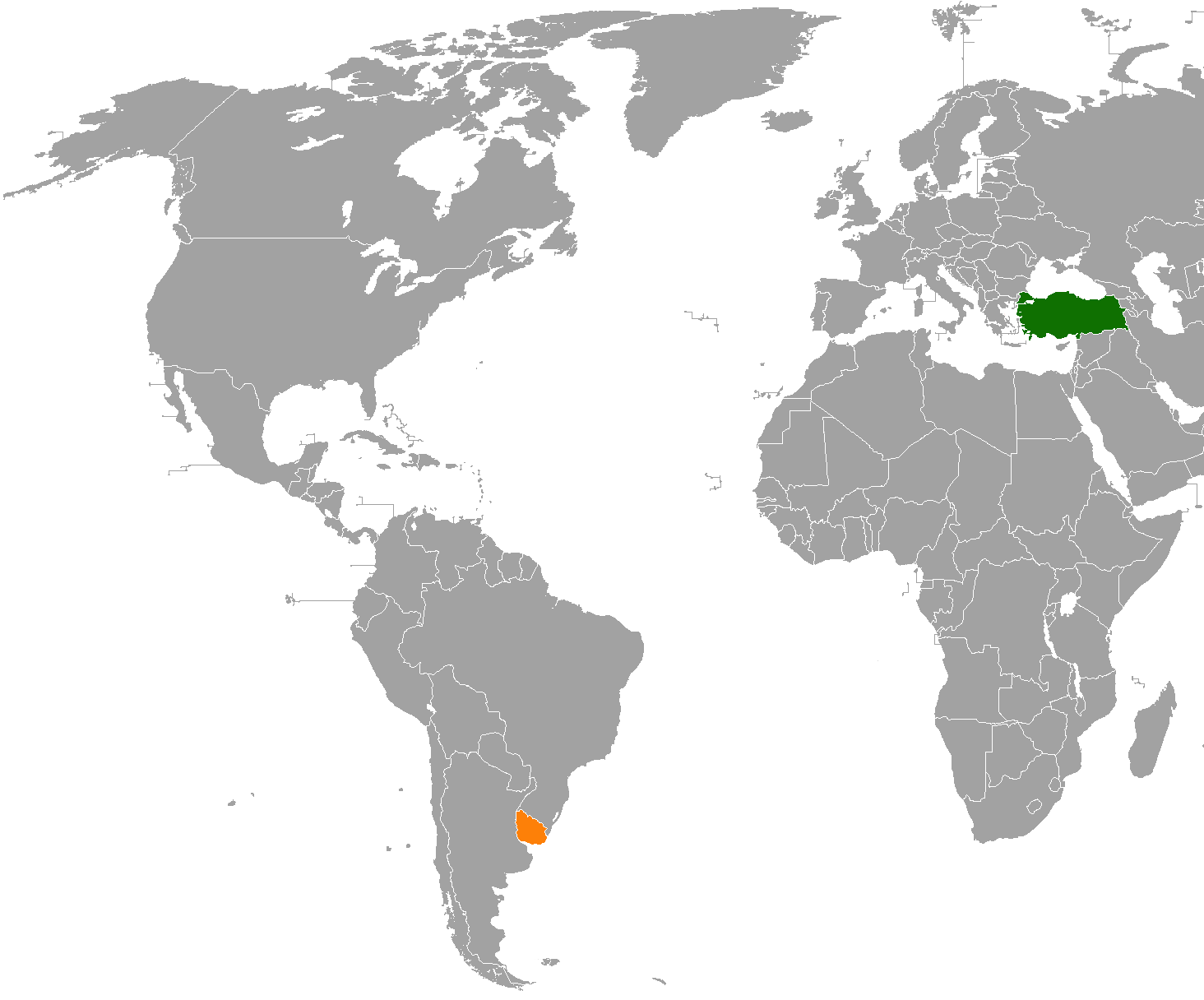
- Uruguay: Turkey

Diplomatic mission
- Embassy of Uruguay, Ankara: Embassy of Turkey, Montevideo

Turkey–Uruguay relations are the diplomatic relations between Turkey and Uruguay. Turkey has an embassy in Montevideo. Uruguay has an embassy in Ankara and a consulate-general in Istanbul. Diplomatic relations between Uruguay and Turkey were established by the Friendship Agreement, which was signed in 1929. They maintain a good relationship, but the relations have been stagnant due to geographical locations.

== Economic relations ==
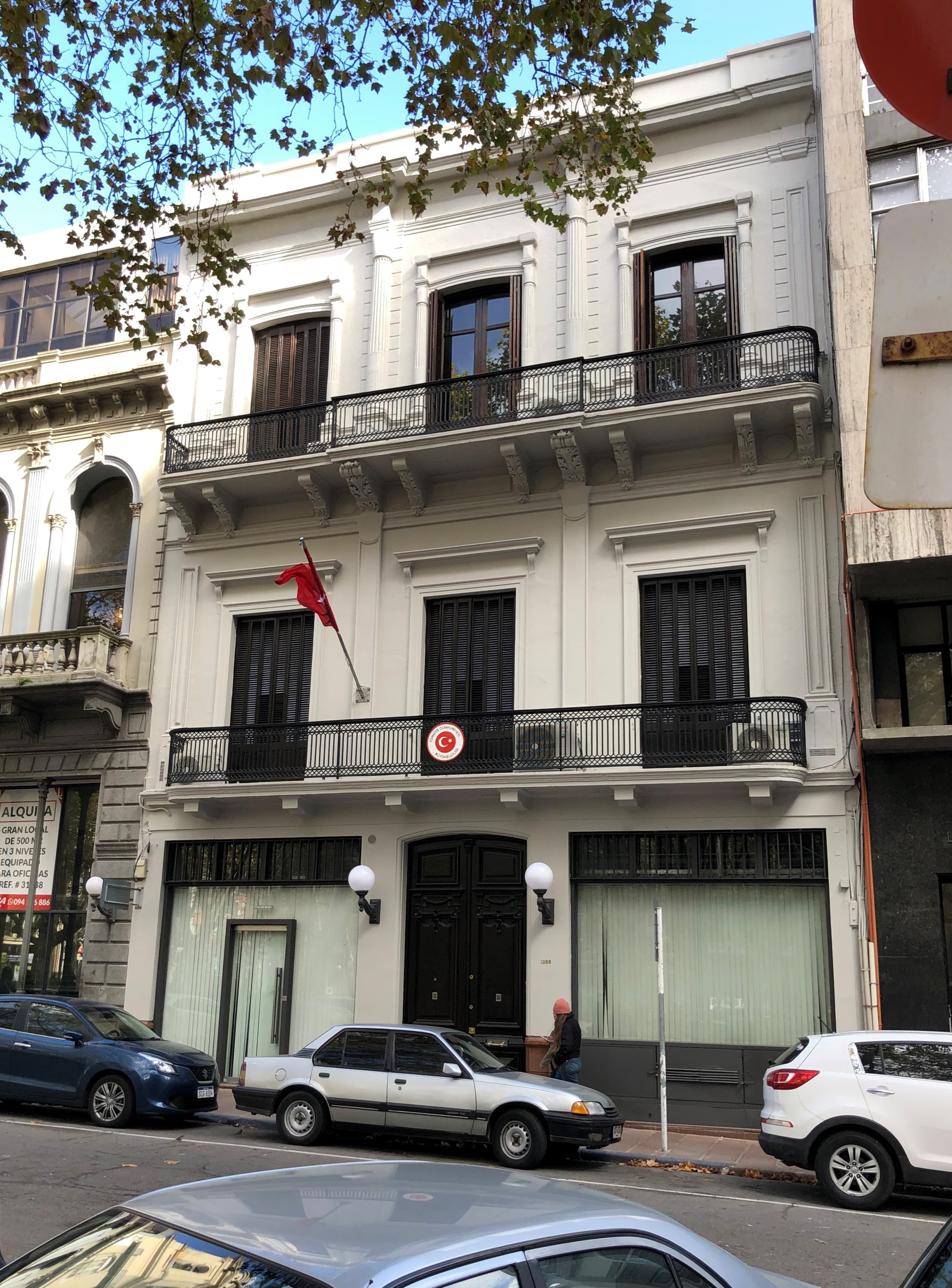
Embassy of Turkey in Montevideo

Trade volume between the two countries was US$341.4 million in 2019 (Turkish exports/imports: 42.8/298.6 million USD).

== See also ==
- Foreign relations of Uruguay
- Foreign relations of Turkey
