= List of diplomatic missions in Uruguay =

This is a list of diplomatic missions in Uruguay. There are currently 44 embassies in Montevideo. Several countries have non-resident embassies.

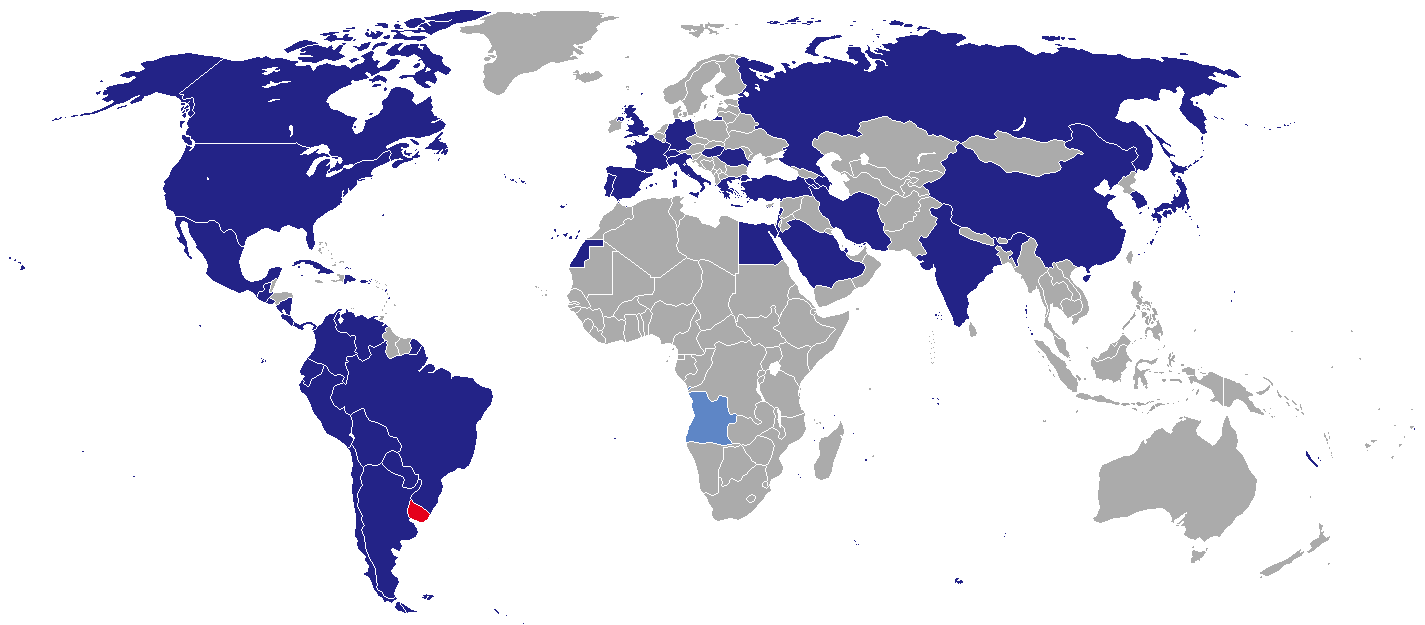
Map of diplomatic missions in Uruguay

== Diplomatic missions in Montevideo ==
=== Embassies ===
1. Argentina
2. Armenia
3. Bolivia
4. Brazil
5. Canada
6. Chile
7. China
8. Colombia
9. Costa Rica
10. Cuba
11. Dominican Republic
12. Ecuador
13. Egypt
14. El Salvador
15. France
16. Germany
17. Greece
18. Guatemala
19. Holy See
20. India
21. Iran
22. Israel
23. Italy
24. Japan
25. Lebanon
26. Mexico
27. Nicaragua
28. Palestine
29. Panama
30. Paraguay
31. Peru
32. Portugal
33. Qatar
34. Romania
35. Russia
36. Sovereign Military Order of Malta
37. Sahrawi Republic
38. Saudi Arabia
39. South Korea
40. Spain
41. Switzerland
42. Turkey
43. United Kingdom
44. United States

=== Other posts ===
1. Azerbaijan (Embassy office) (Note: Subordinate to the embassy in Buenos Aires, Argentina)
2. European Union (Delegation)
3. Hungary (Embassy office)

=== Gallery of embassies ===
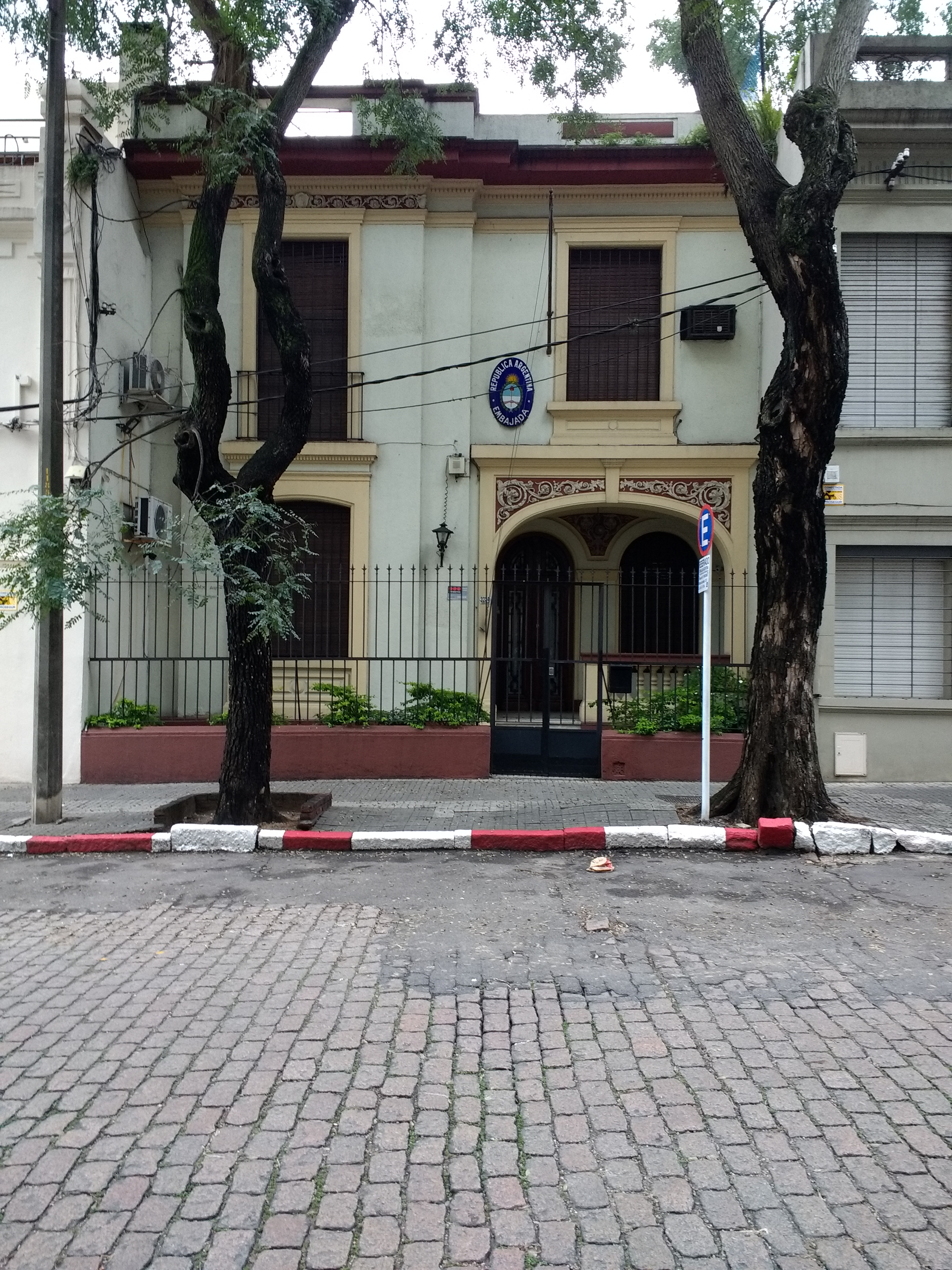
Embassy of Argentina

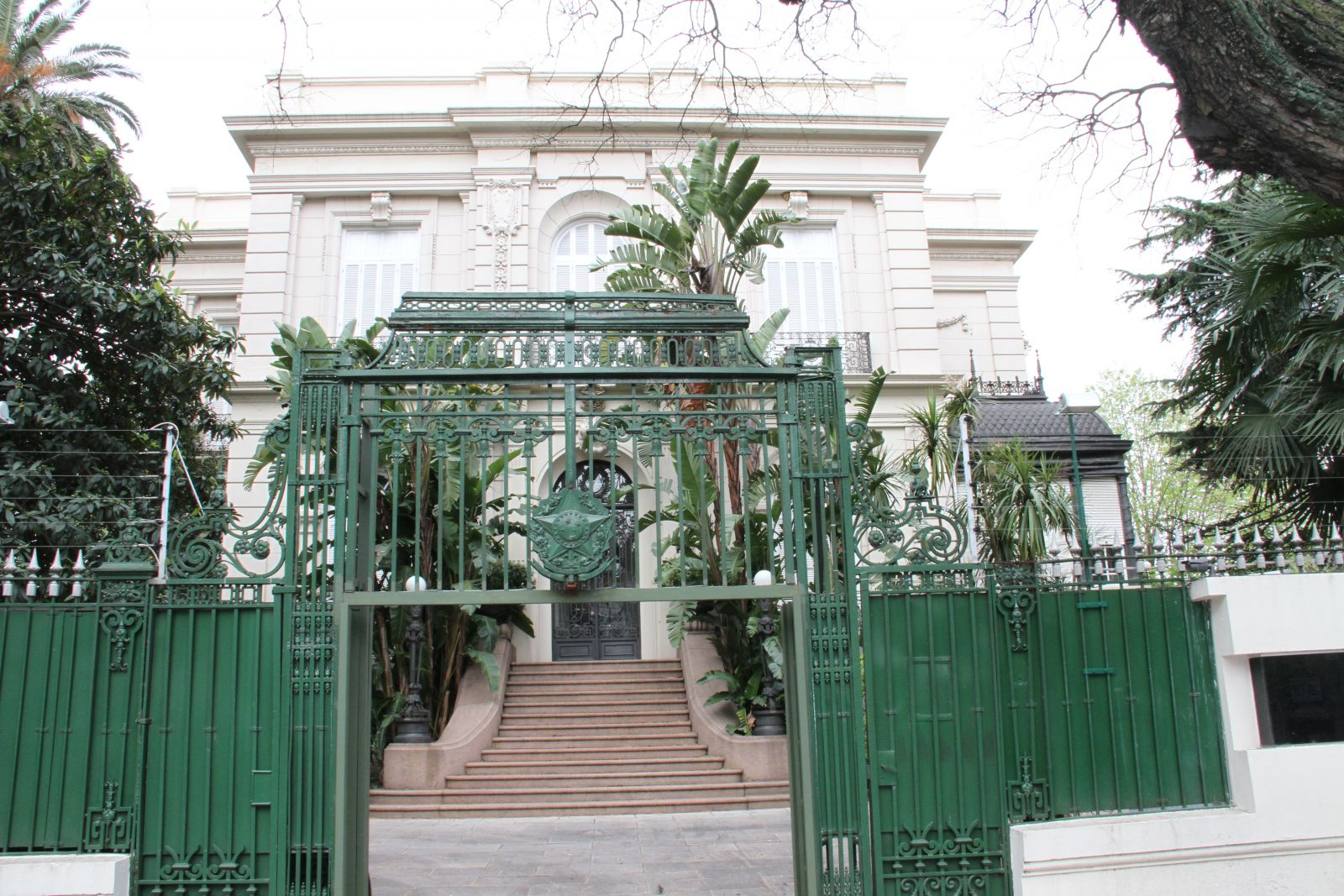
Embassy of Brazil

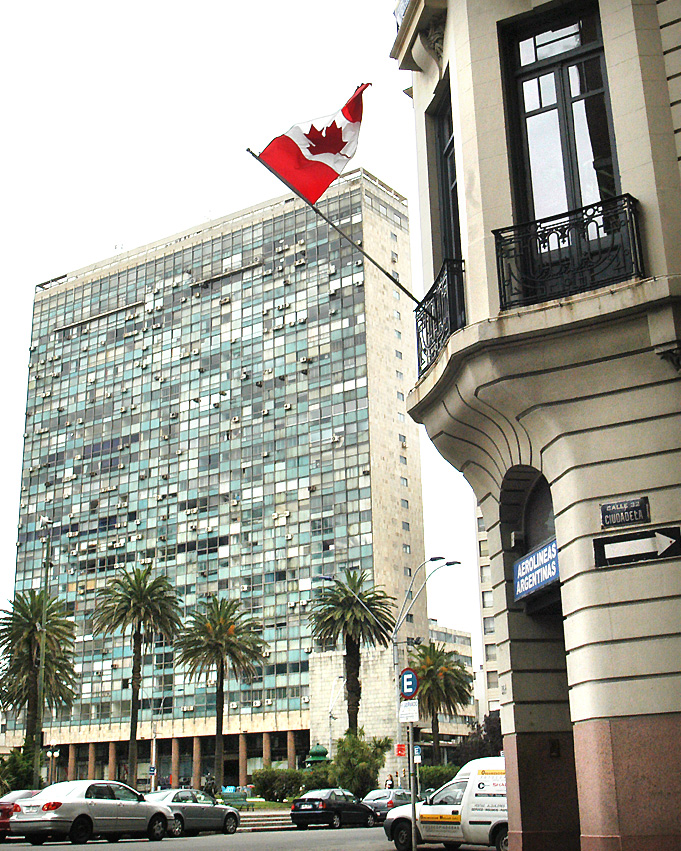
Embassy of Canada

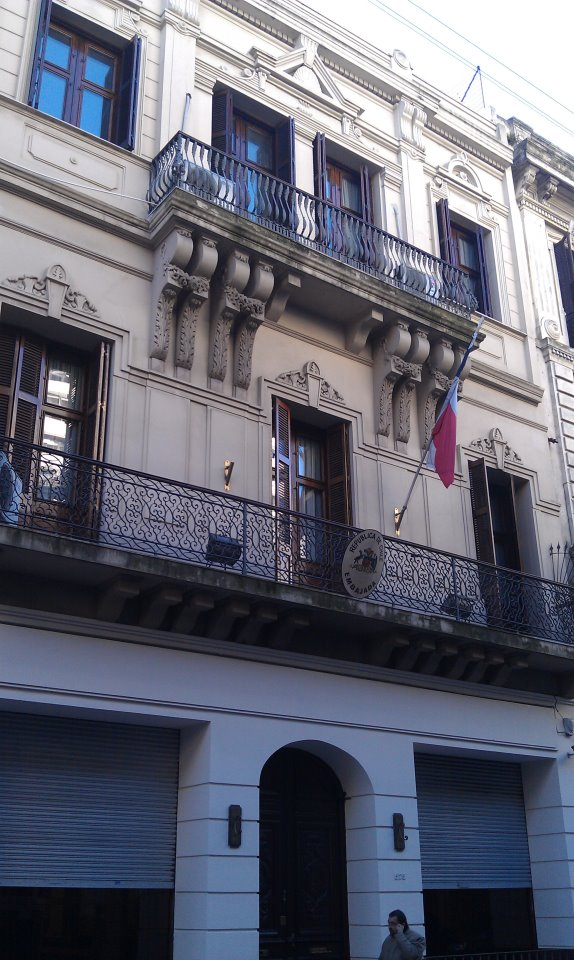
Embassy of Chile

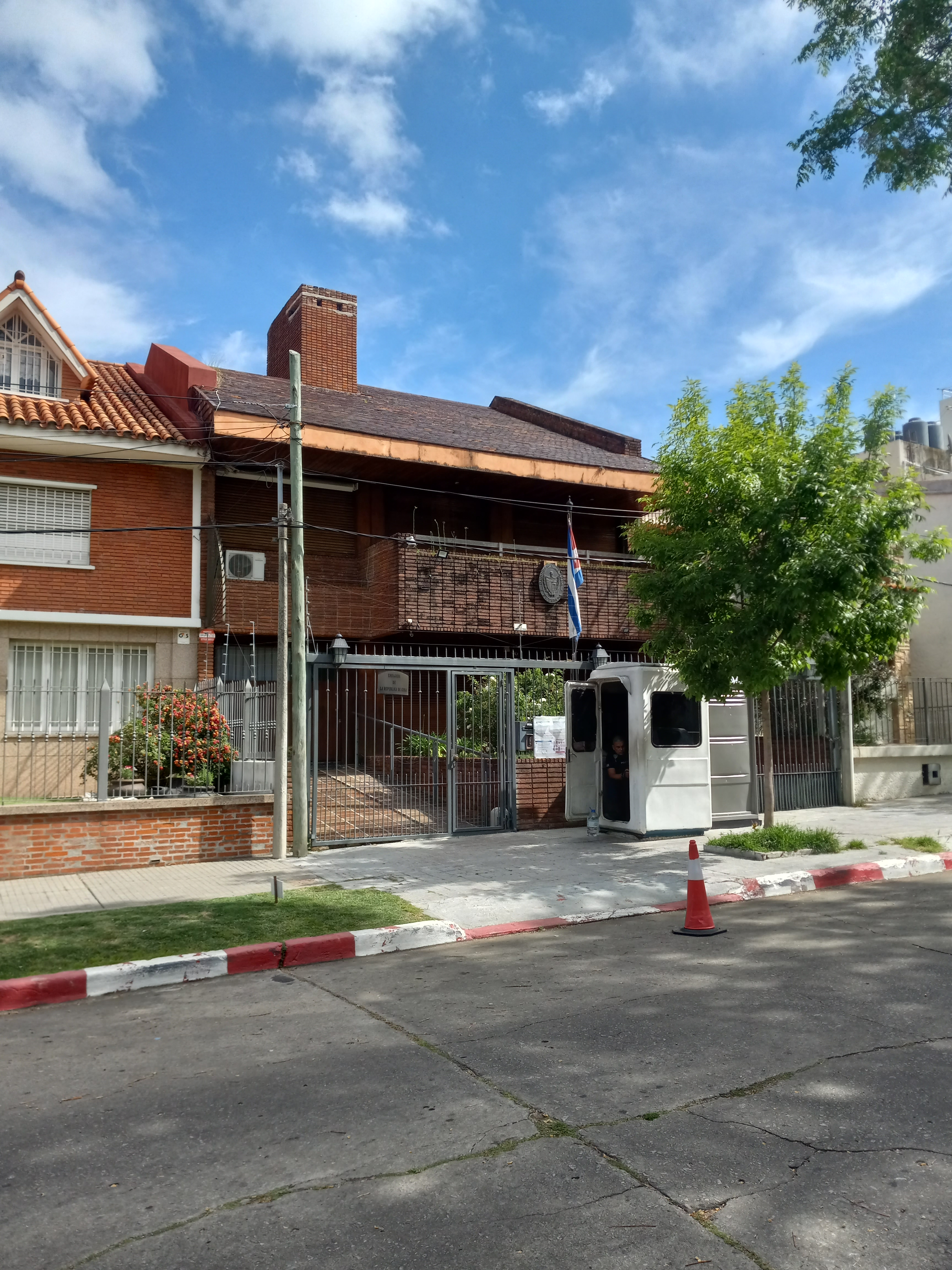
Embassy of Cuba

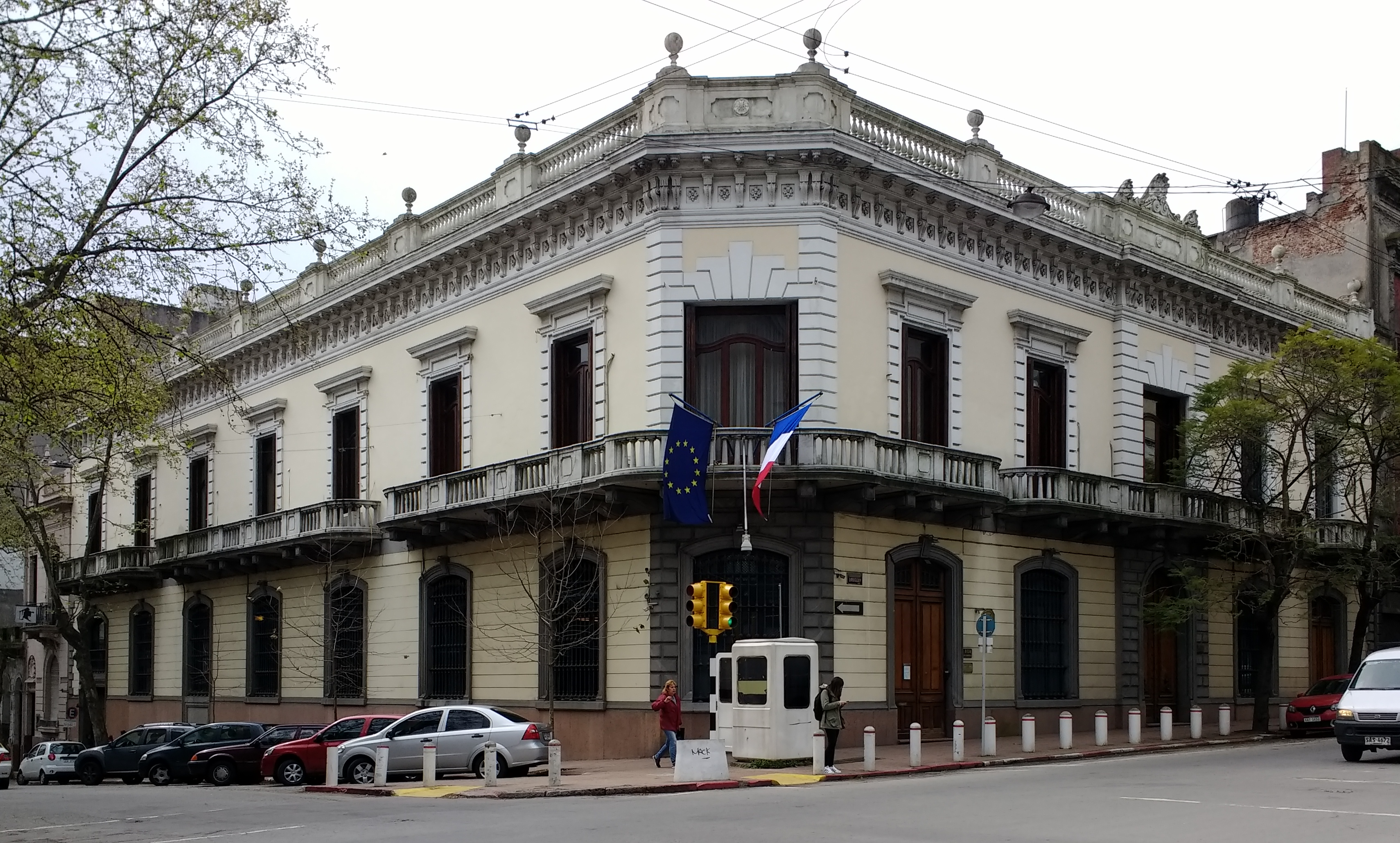
Embassy of France

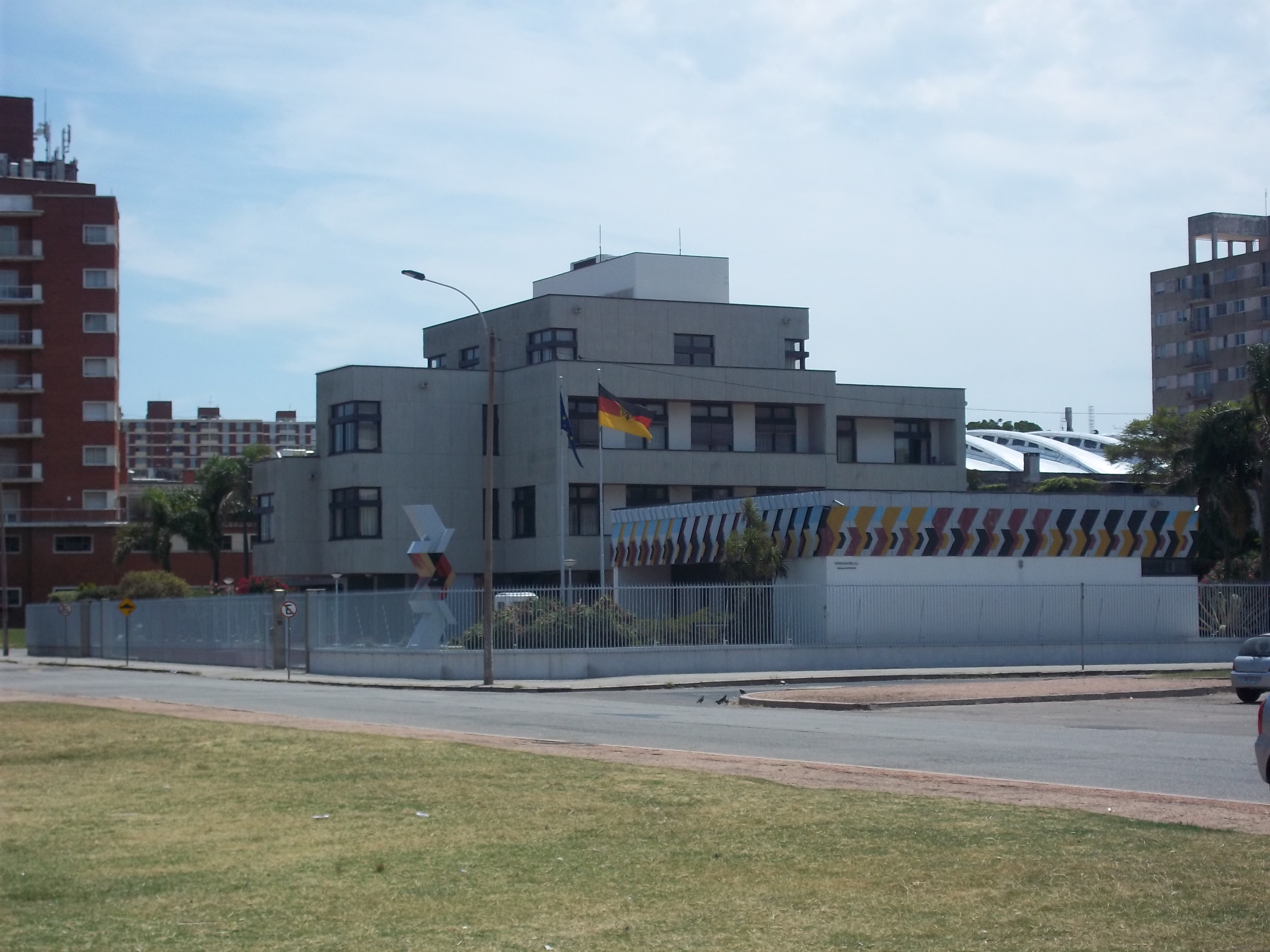
Embassy of Germany

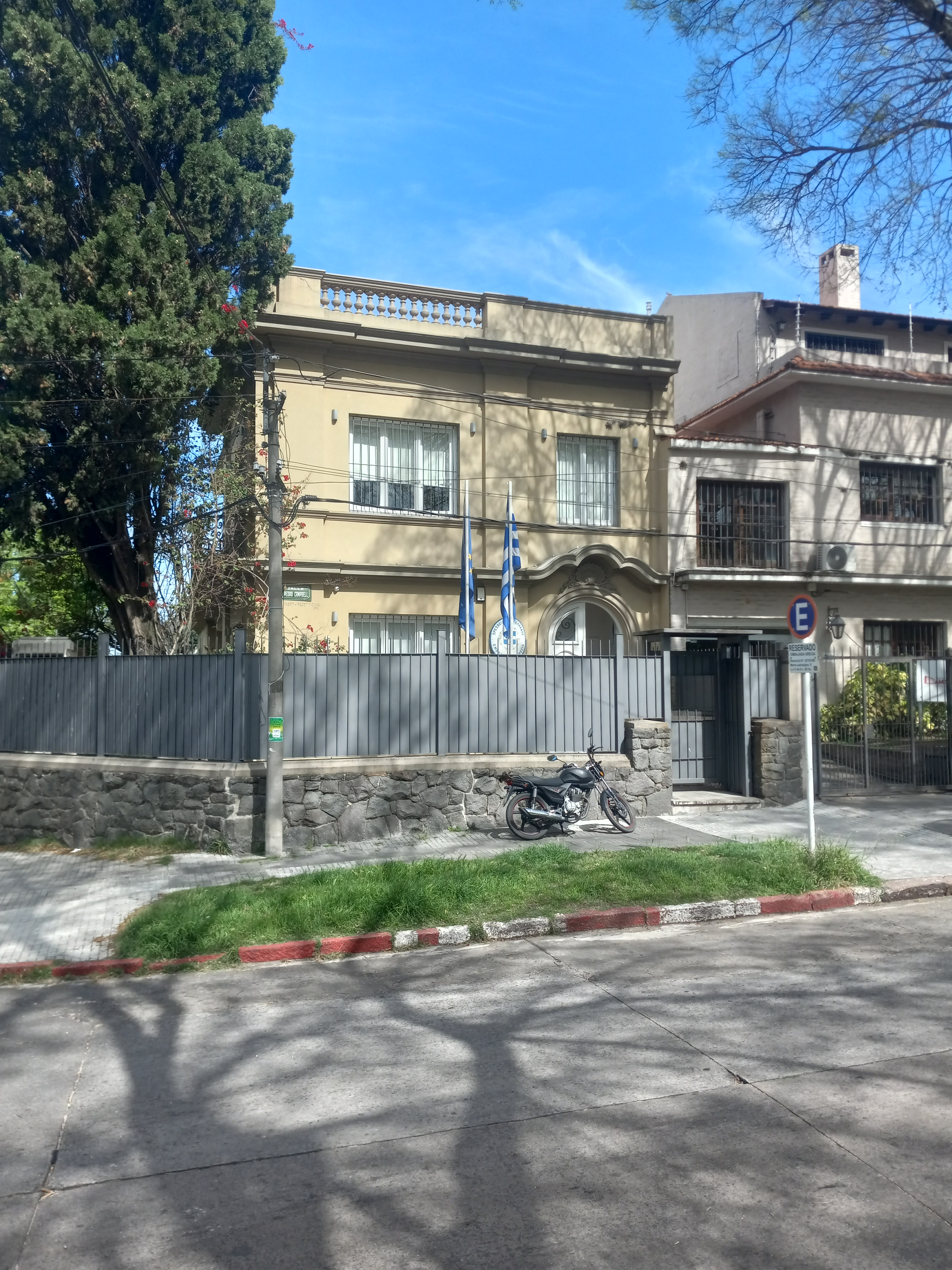
Embassy of Greece

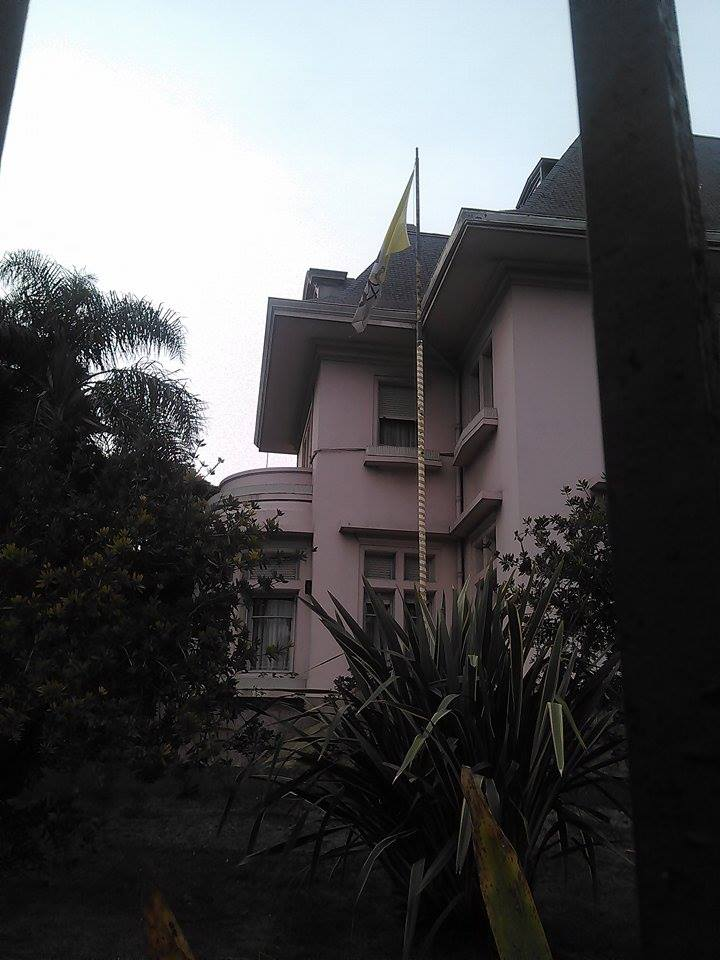
Apostolic Nunciature of the Holy See

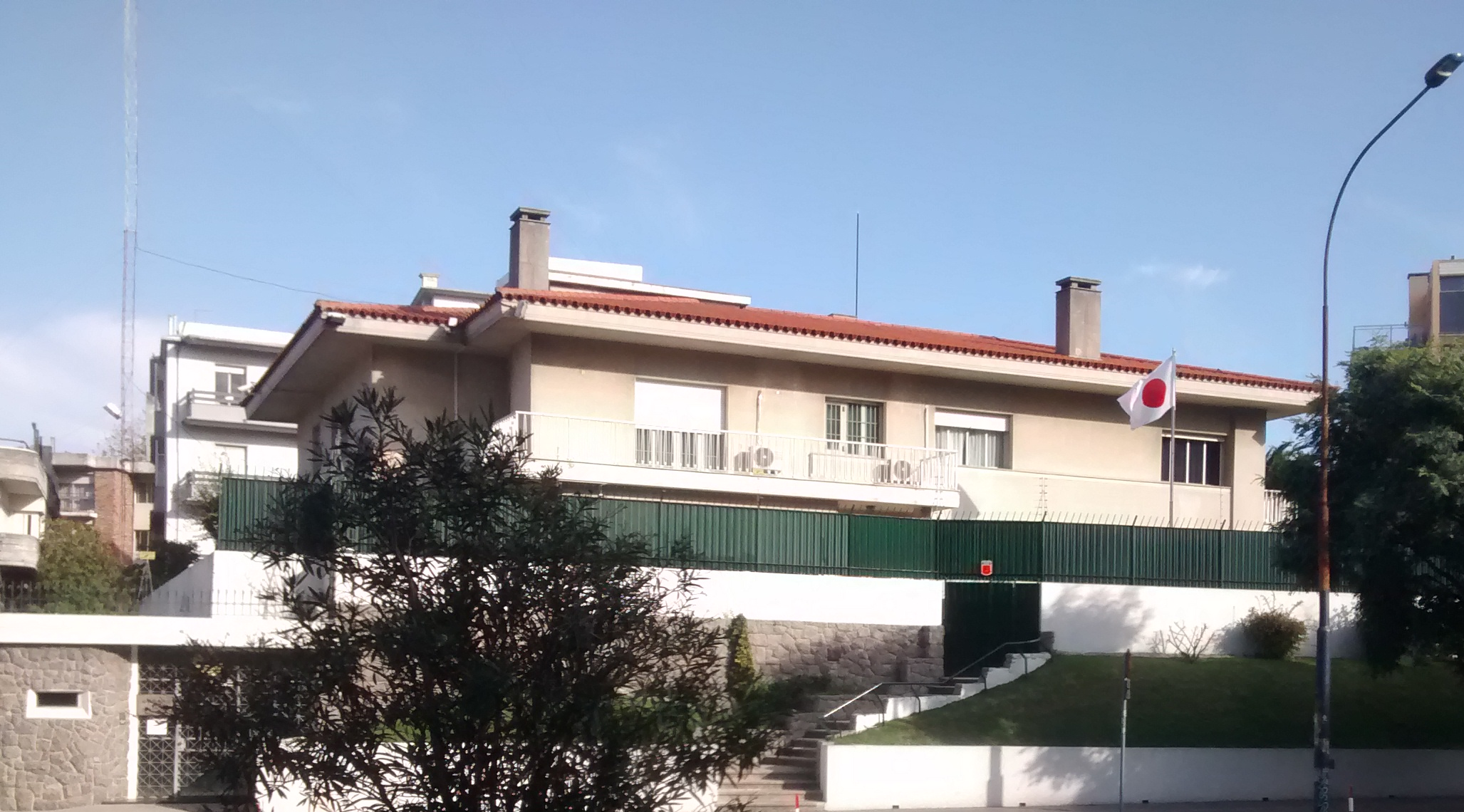
Embassy of Japan

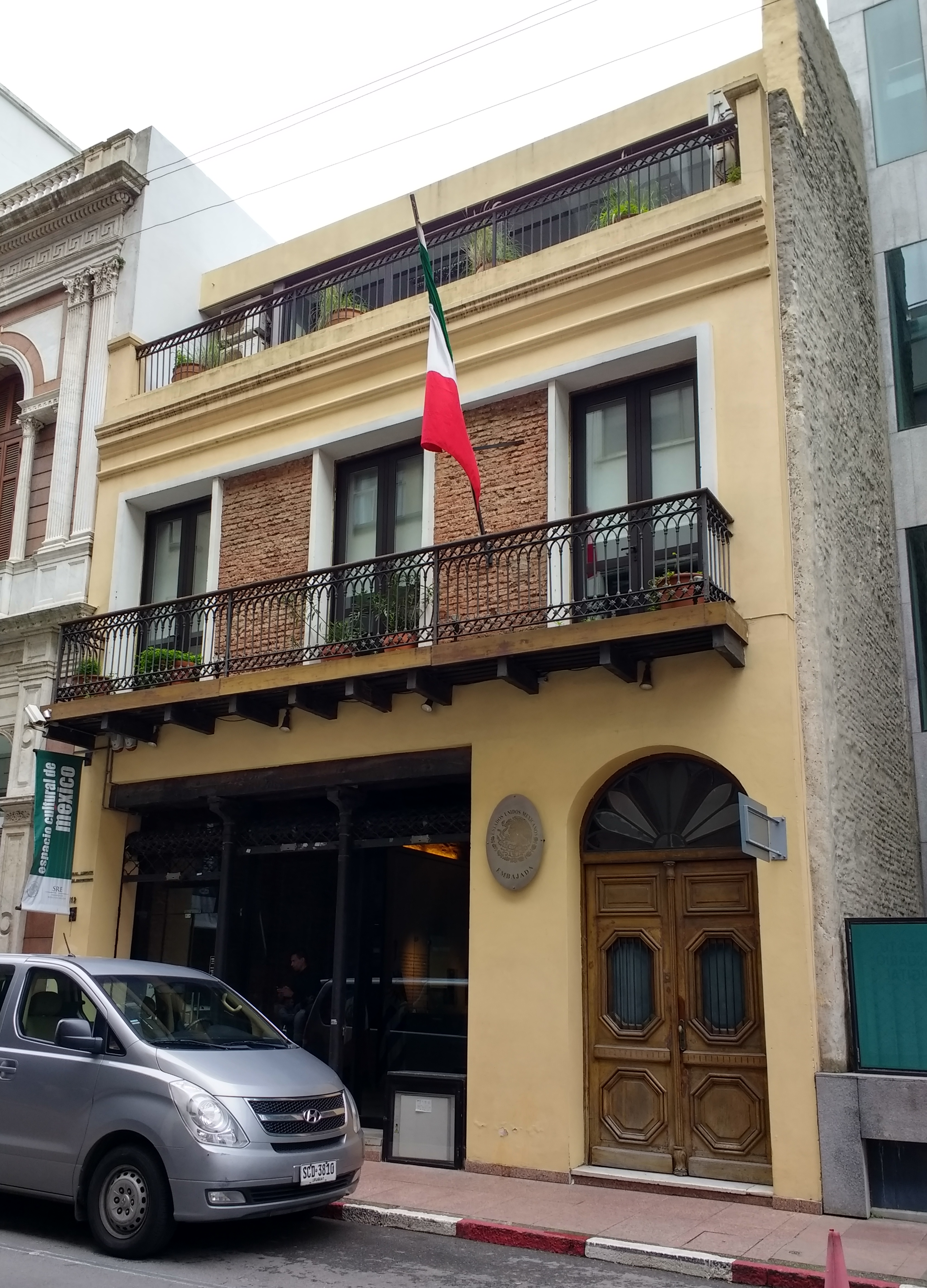
Embassy of Mexico

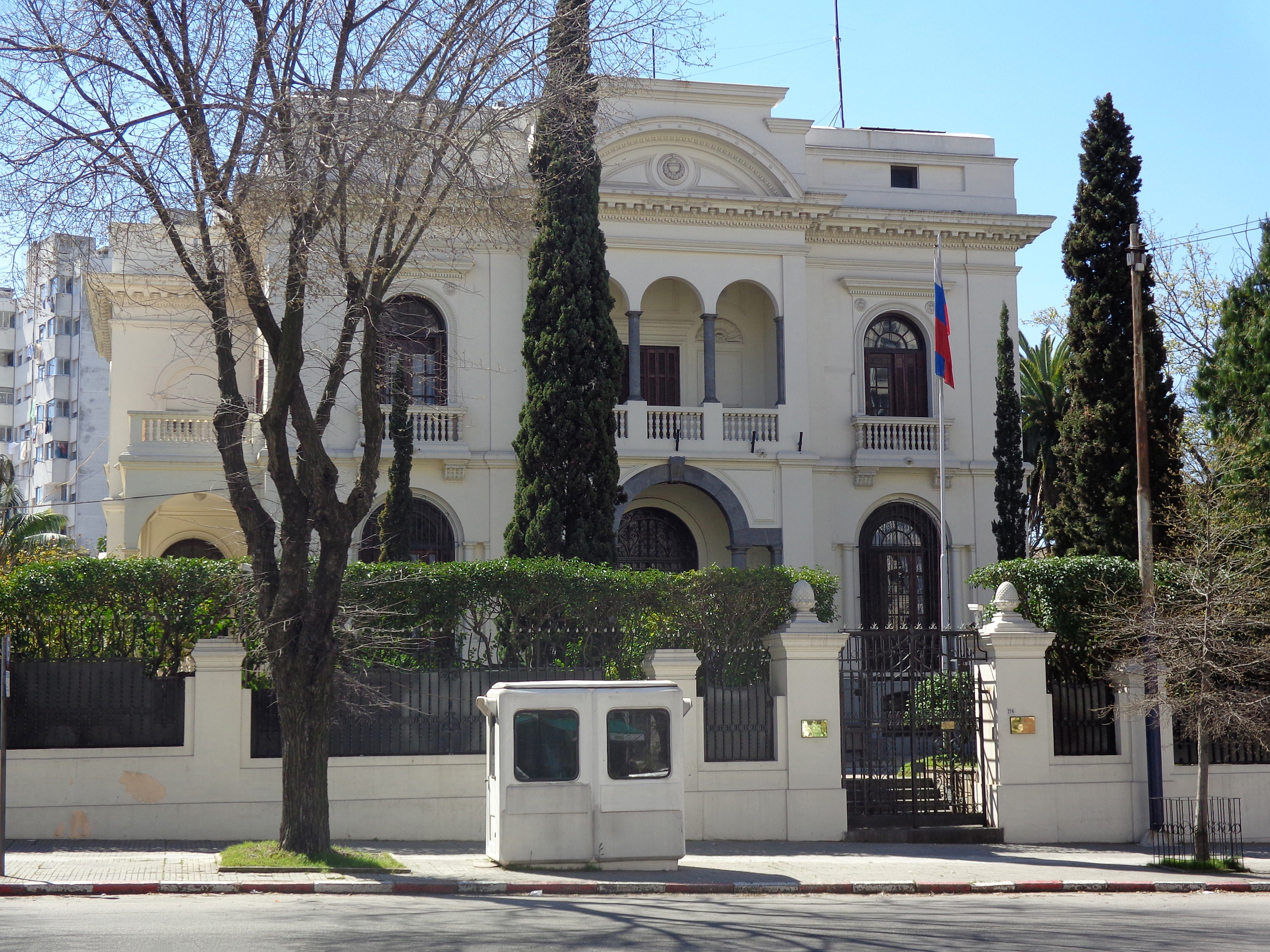
Embassy of Russia

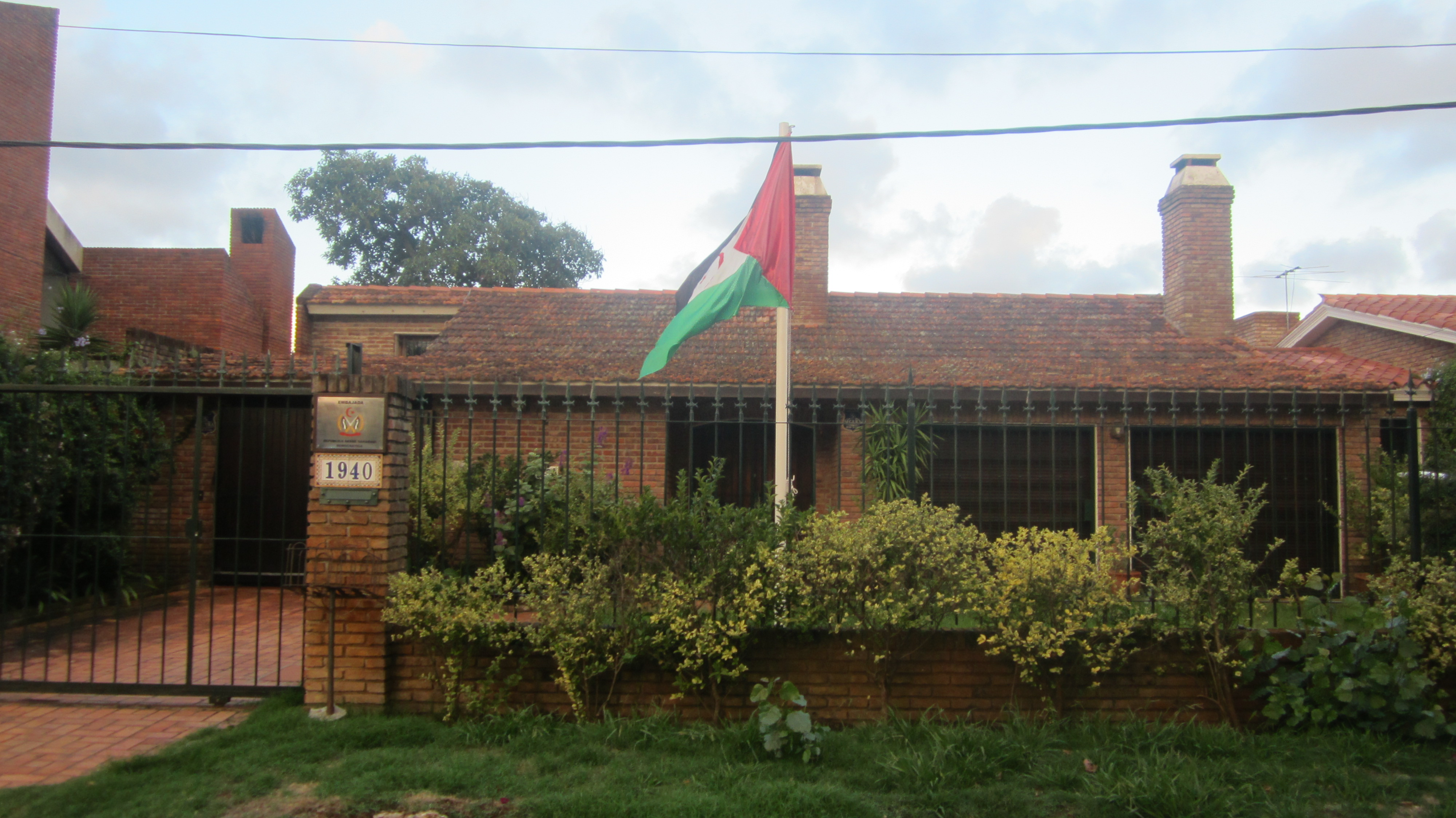
Embassy of the Sahrawi Republic

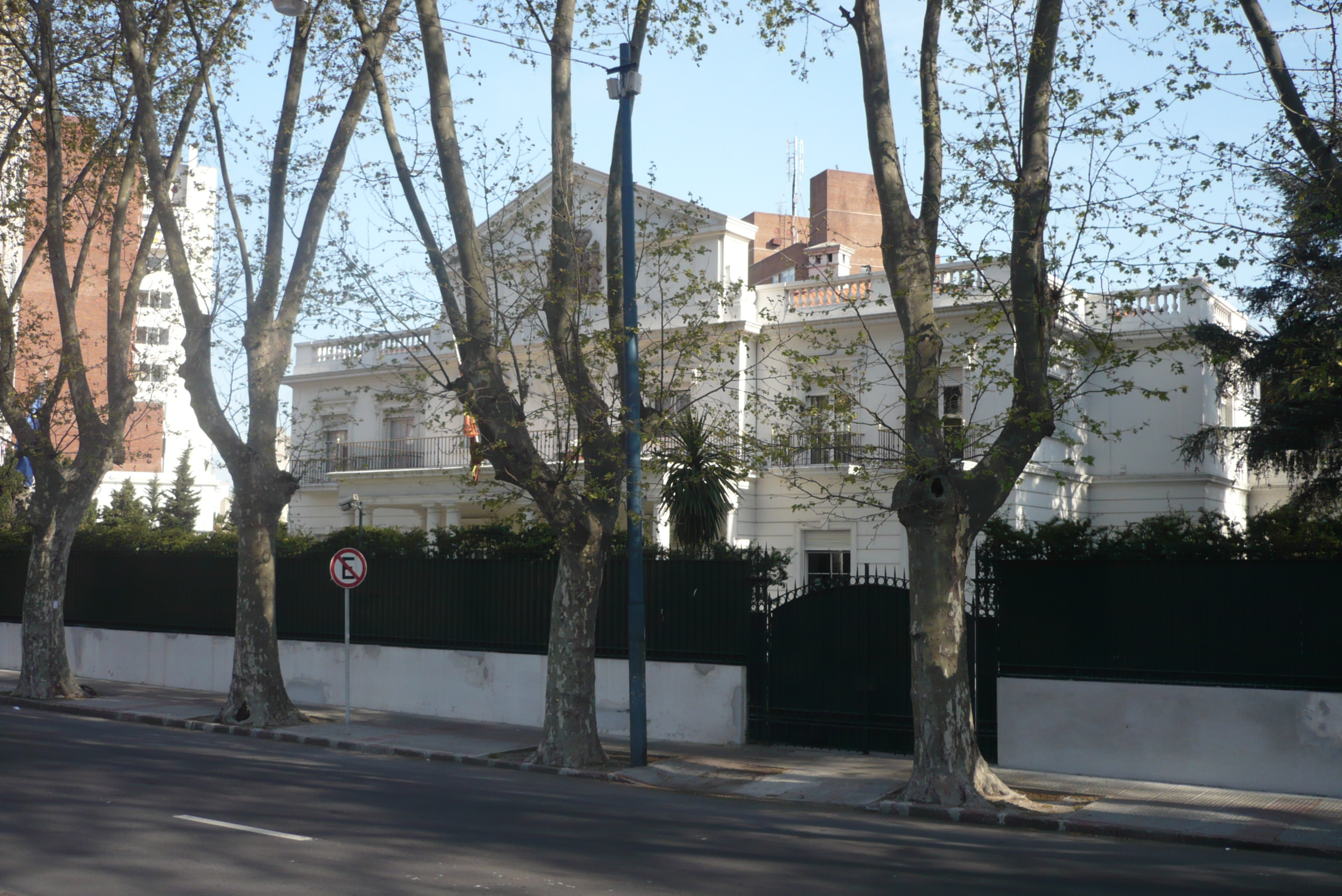
Embassy of Spain

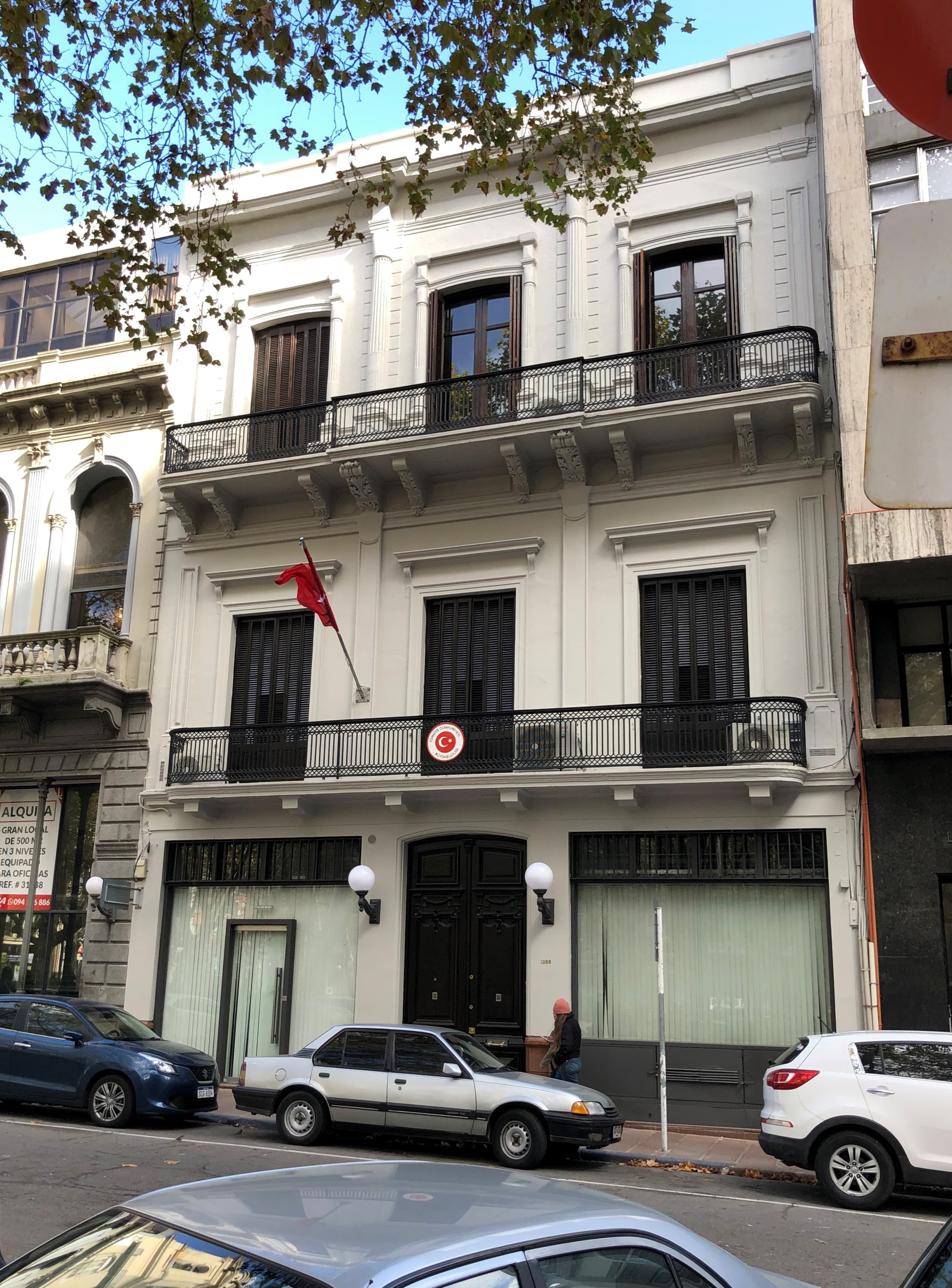
Embassy of Turkey

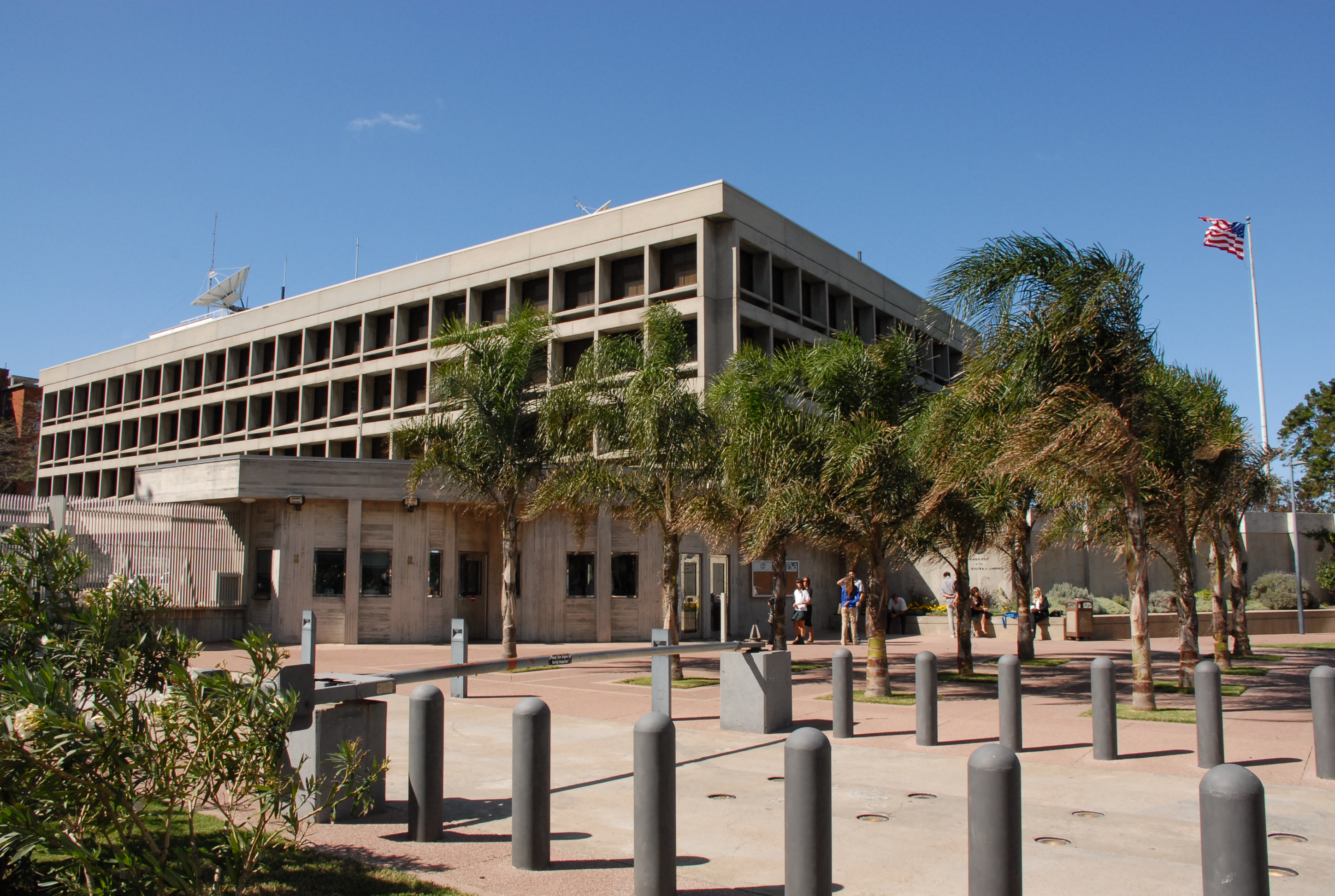
Embassy of the United States

== Consular missions ==
=== Montevideo ===
- Angola (Consulate-General)
- Venezuela (Consular section)

=== Artigas ===
- Brazil (Vice-Consulate)

=== Chuy ===
- Brazil (Consulate)

=== Colonia del Sacramento ===
- Argentina (Consulate)

=== Fray Bentos ===
- Argentina (Consulate)

=== Maldonado ===
- Argentina (Consulate)

=== Paysandú ===
- Argentina (Consulate)

=== Río Branco ===
- Brazil (Vice-Consulate)

=== Rivera ===
- Brazil (Consulate General)

=== Salto ===
- Argentina (Consulate)

== Non-resident embassies ==
=== Resident in Brasília, Brazil ===
1. Albania
2. Angola
3. Bangladesh
4. Barbados
5. Belarus
6. Benin
7. Botswana
8. Burkina Faso
9. Cambodia
10. Cameroon
11. Cyprus
12. Denmark
13. Equatorial Guinea
14. Ethiopia
15. Gabon
16. Ghana
17. Guinea
18. Guinea-Bissau
19. Guyana
20. Ivory Coast
21. Kenya
22. Malawi
23. Mauritania
24. Mozambique
25. Namibia
26. Oman
27. Senegal
28. Suriname
29. Sri Lanka
30. Trinidad and Tobago
31. Zimbabwe

=== Resident in Buenos Aires, Argentina ===
1. Algeria
2. Australia
3. Austria
4. Azerbaijan
5. Belgium
6. Bulgaria
7. Congo-Kinshasa
8. Croatia
9. Czechia
10. Finland
11. Georgia
12. Haiti
13. Honduras
14. Hungary
15. Indonesia
16. Ireland
17. Kuwait
18. Libya
19. Malaysia
20. Morocco
21. Montenegro
22. Netherlands
23. Nigeria
24. Norway
25. New Zealand
26. Philippines
27. Pakistan
28. Poland
29. Serbia
30. Slovakia
31. Slovenia
32. South Africa
33. Sweden
34. Syria
35. Thailand
36. Tunisia
37. United Arab Emirates
38. Ukraine
39. Vietnam

=== Resident in Washington, D.C., United States ===
1. Afghanistan
2. Iceland
3. Madagascar
4. Malta

=== Resident elsewhere ===
1. Grenada (Caracas)
2. Jordan (Santiago de Chile)
3. Mongolia (Havana)
4. San Marino (Rome)

== Closed missions ==
Host city	Sending country	Mission level	Year closed	Ref.
Montevideo	Bulgaria	Embassy	1998	
Montevideo	Czechia	Embassy	2008	
Montevideo	East Germany	Embassy	1990 (Note: Existed as a commercial mission from 1954 to 1973, when it opened as an embassy.)	
Montevideo	Netherlands	Embassy	2012	
Montevideo	Poland	Embassy	2008	
Montevideo	South Africa	Embassy	2016	
Montevideo	Sweden	Embassy	1993	
Montevideo	Venezuela	Embassy	2024	

== See also ==
- Foreign relations of Uruguay
- List of diplomatic missions of Uruguay
- Visa policy of Uruguay
