= Belgium–Uruguay relations =

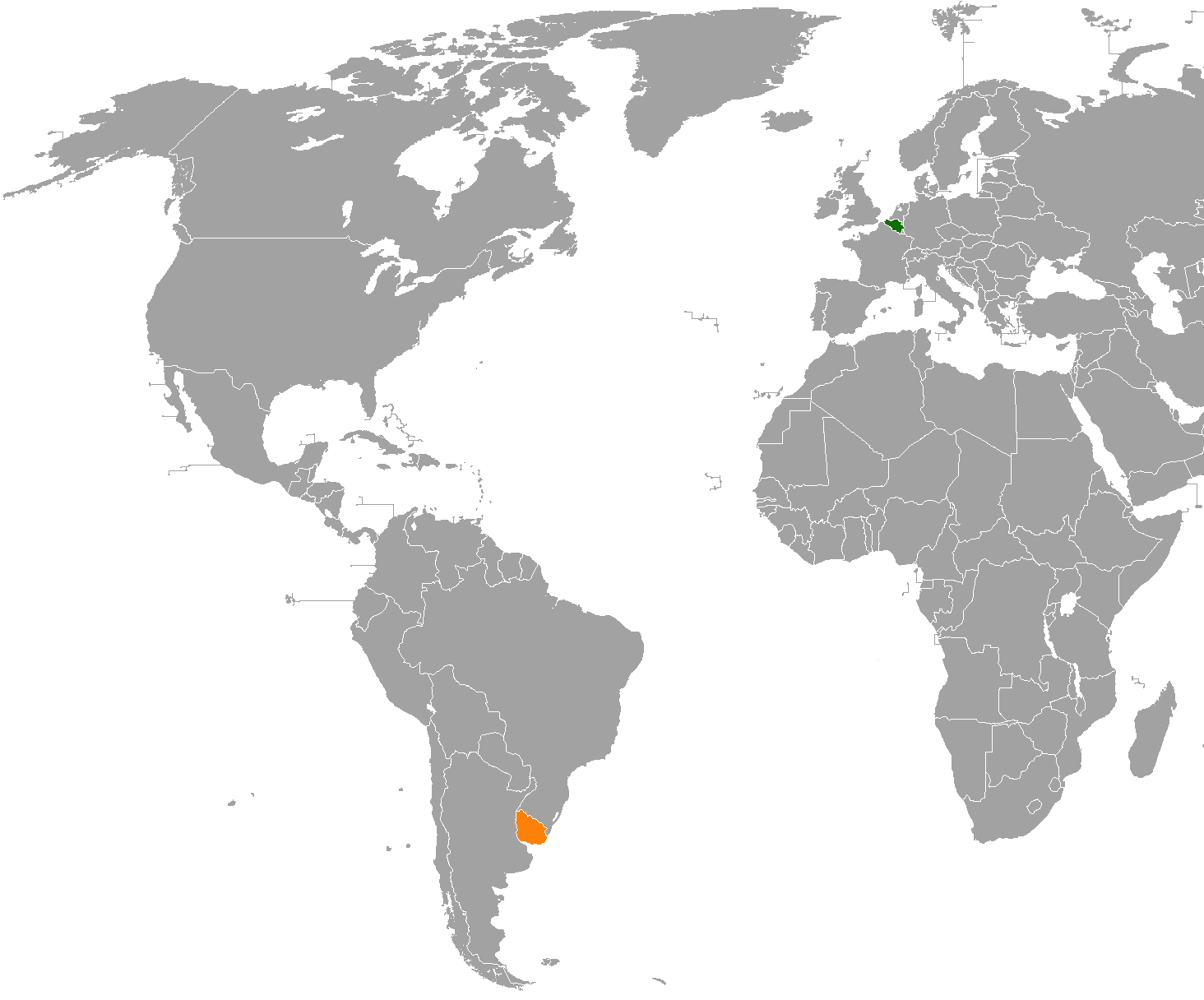
- Belgium: Uruguay

Belgium–Uruguay relations refer to the bilateral relations between Belgium and Uruguay. Belgium has an honorary consulate in Montevideo, under the jurisdiction of the Belgian embassy in Buenos Aires. Uruguay has an embassy in Brussels (the ambassador being also concurrent to Luxembourg).

== Trade and investment ==
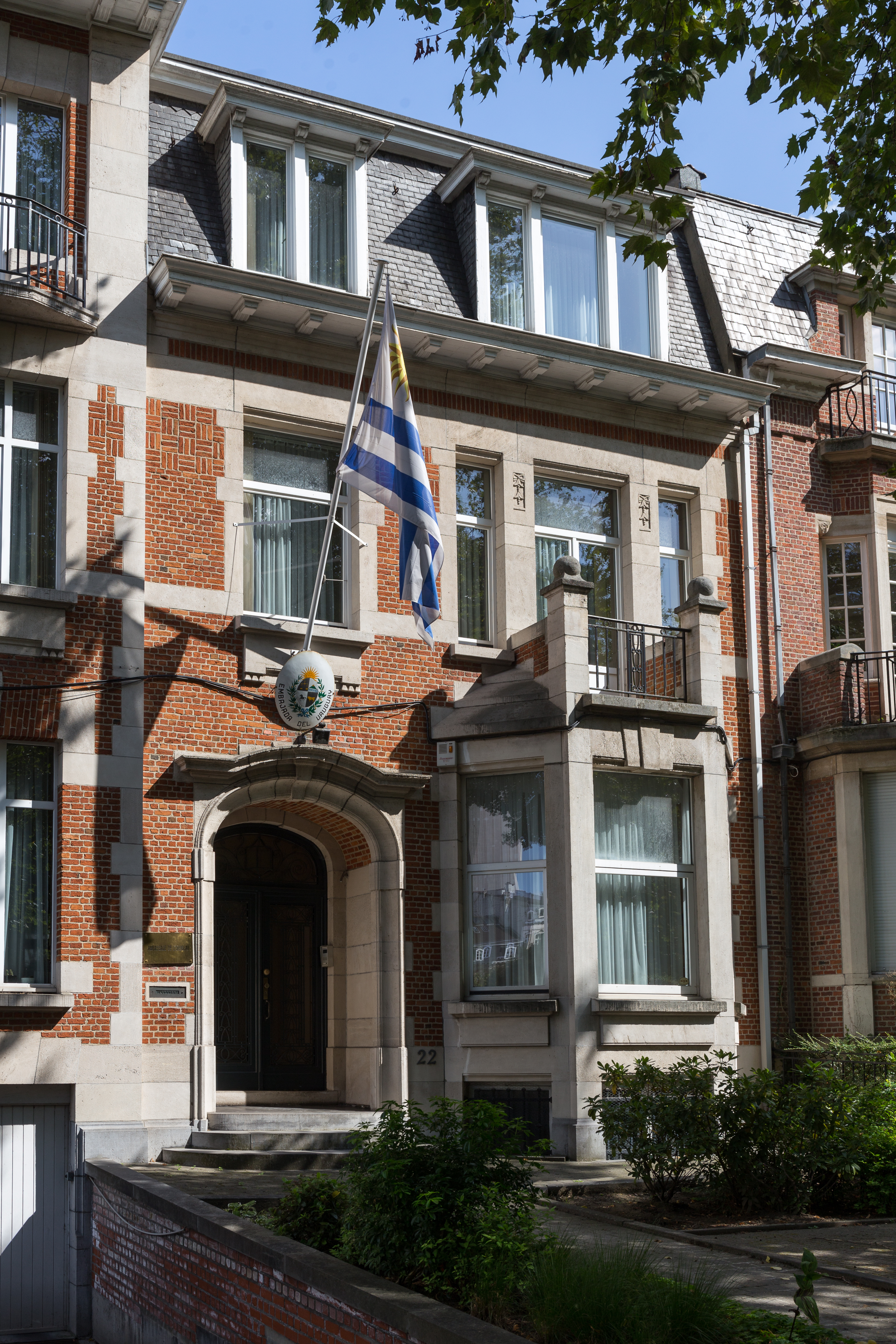
Embassy of Uruguay in Brussels

There are 2 bilateral agreements linking both countries:

- Investment promotion and protection agreement (1991)
- Social security agreement (2006)

The Belgian company Katoen Natie has an important container handling facility in the Port of Montevideo.

Belgium is becoming a significant trading partner of Uruguay.

== Official visits ==
In 2008, the then Prince Philippe of Belgium visited Uruguay, together with many Belgian entrepreneurs interested in strengthening mutual trade relationships.

In October 2011, Uruguayan President José Mujica paid an official visit to Belgium.

In June 2018, Princess Astrid visited Montevideo.

== Resident diplomatic missions ==
- Belgium is accredited to Uruguay from its embassy in Buenos Aires, Argentina.
- Uruguay has an embassy in Brussels.

== See also ==
- Foreign relations of Belgium
- Foreign relations of Uruguay
