= India–Uruguay relations =

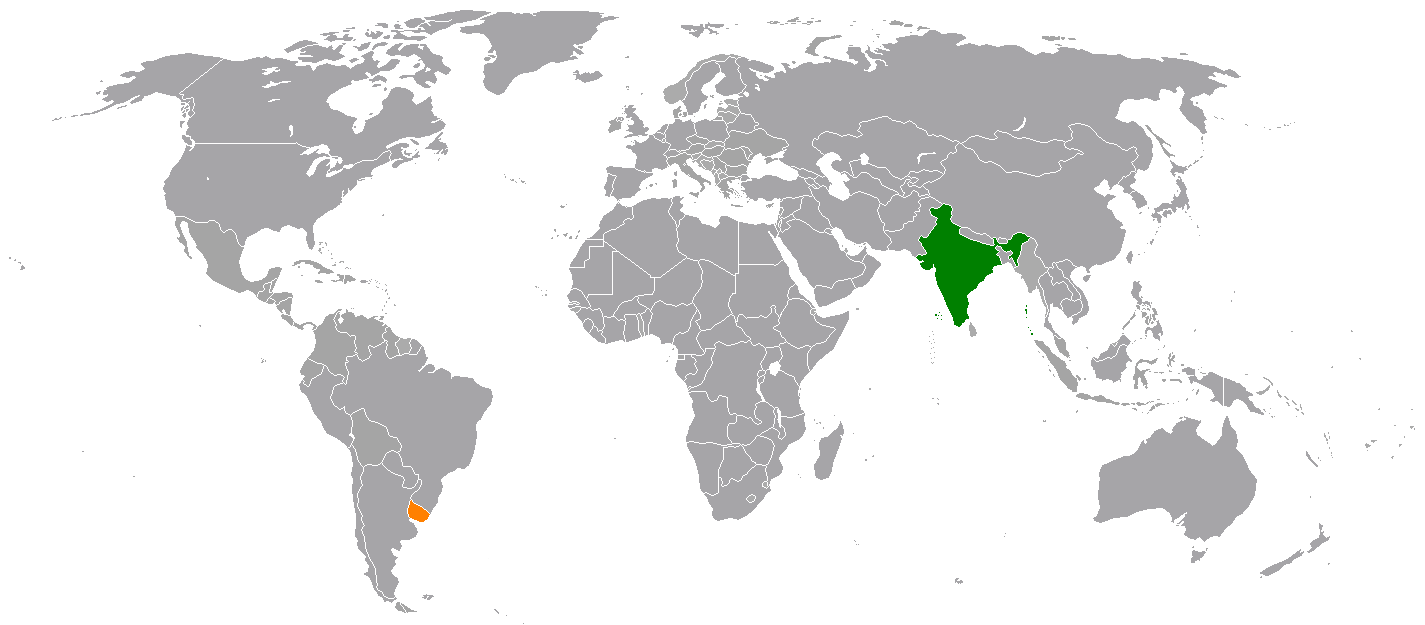
- India: Uruguay

Diplomatic mission
- Consulate General of India in Montevideo: Embassy of Uruguay in New Delhi

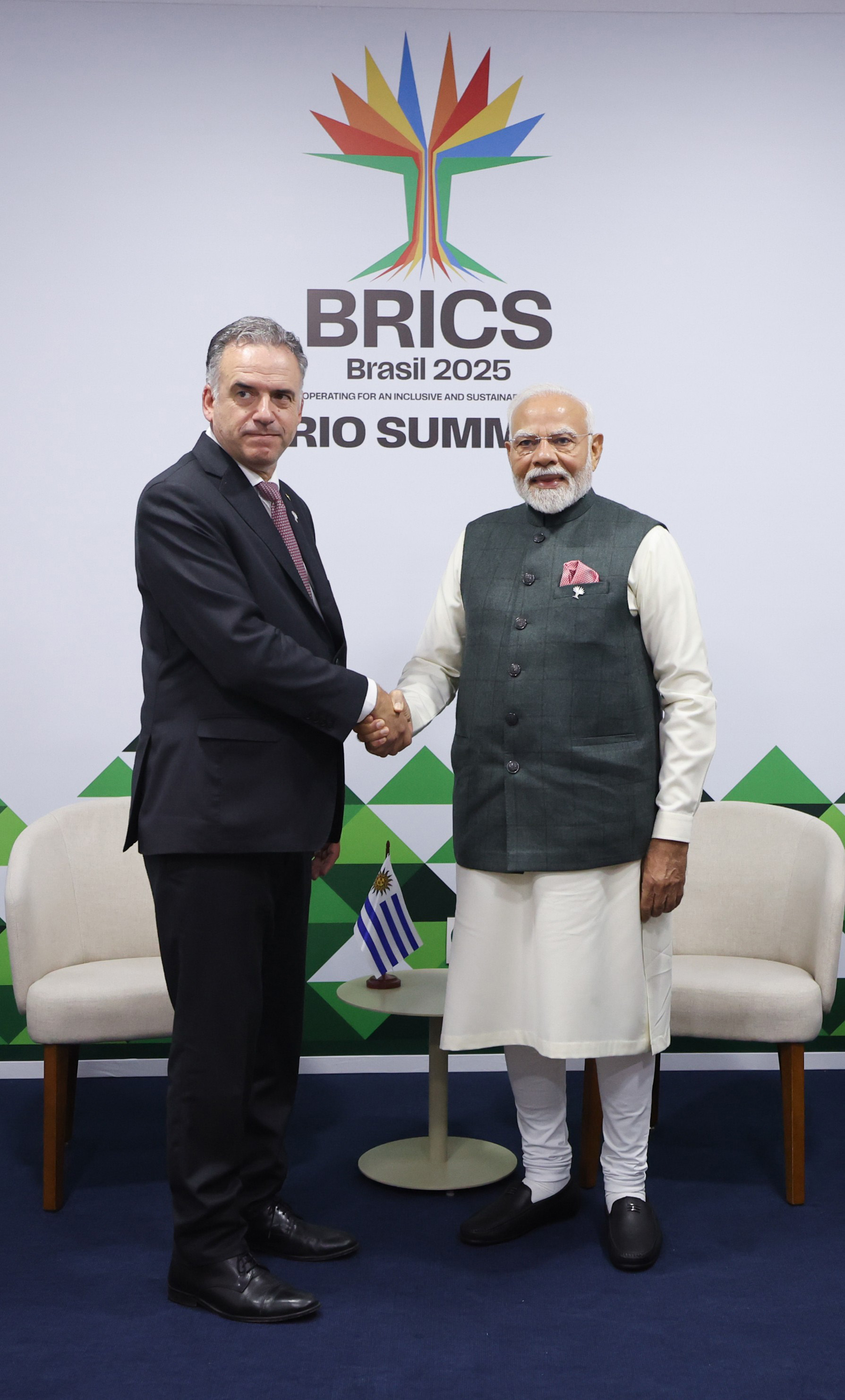
Prime Minister Shri Narendra Modi with the President of Uruguay Mr. Yamandu Orsi at BRICS Summit in July, 2025.

India is represented in Uruguay through its embassy in Buenos Aires in Argentina; it also has a consulate general in Montevideo. Uruguay has an embassy in New Delhi and a consulate in Mumbai. Diplomatic relations were established in 1948. The Uruguayan embassy in New Delhi was first opened in 1960 and operated until 1975. It was re-opened in 1998. In August 2026, India opened a resident embassy in Montevideo.

== High level visits ==
In 1968, Indira Gandhi became the first Indian Prime Minister to visit Uruguay. Several ministerial visits between the two countries have taken place. Uruguayan Vice-President Hugo Fernandez Faingold visited India in 1999, and is the highest ranking Uruguayan official to visit the country.

== Bilateral agreements ==
The two countries have signed several bilateral agreements. In 1999, the two sides signed an MoU on holding foreign office consultations, an agreement under which Uruguayan diplomats can attend training course in the Foreign Service Institute of India, and an agreement to issue long-term visas to businessmen. An MoU on establishing a Joint Commission to promote bilateral relations was signed in January 2007. In September 2011, India and Uruguay signed agreements for the avoidance of double taxation and on co-operation in renewable energy. In January 2017, India's Union Cabinet approved the ratification of a customs agreement with Uruguay which provides a legal framework for information and intelligence sharing between customs authorities.

The two countries have regularly supported each other at international fora. Uruguay supported India's bid for election to the UN Human Rights Council for the term 2015–17.

Both countries are members of the Group of 77.

== Economic relations ==
Bilateral trade between India and Uruguay totaled US$218.4 million in 2015, registering a growth of 28.1% over the previous year. India exported $204.3 million worth of goods to and imported $14.1 million worth of goods from Uruguay. The main commodities exported from India to Uruguay are chemicals, garments, vehicles, sound and image devices, pharmaceuticals, iron and steel, synthetic yarn, equipment and machinery. India's main imports from Uruguay are wool, leather and timber. India and Uruguay signed a Bilateral Investment Promotion and Protection Agreement (BIPPA) in February 2008. India and Uruguay signed a Bilateral Investment Promotion and Protection Agreement (BIPPA) in February 2008. Uruguay is a member of MERCOSUR and is part of the Mercosur-India preferential trade agreement which came into effect on 1 June 2009.

Indian firm Tata Consultancy Services opened a Global Delivery Centre at Zonamerica in Montevideo in 2002. This was the company's first office in Latin America. India is becoming a significant trading partner of Uruguay; opportunities lying ahead are enormous. Another Indian IT firm Geodesic Ltd acquired a Uruguayan software company in Montevideo in May 2009.

Arcelor Mittal acquired CINTER S.A, a Uruguayan stainless steel tube producer, in December 2007. Several firms owned by NRIs also operate in Uruguay. Tata Motors began operating in Uruguay in May 2015.

Citizens of Uruguay are eligible for scholarships under the Indian Technical and Economic Cooperation Programme. Many Uruguayan diplomats have received training in the Foreign Service Institute of India.

== Cultural relations ==
In February 2011, the Uruguayan postal department issued a stamp honouring the 150th birth anniversary of Rabindranath Tagore.

== Indians in Uruguay ==
As of January 2016, about 83 Indians hold permanent residency in Uruguay. A further 733 Indians reside in the country on long-term visas, most of whom are employed by Tata Consultancy Services in Montevideo. A small number of Indians from the Gujarati and Sindhi communities work as importers and run retail outlets of Indian textiles and handicrafts in Uruguay.
