= Romania–Uruguay relations =

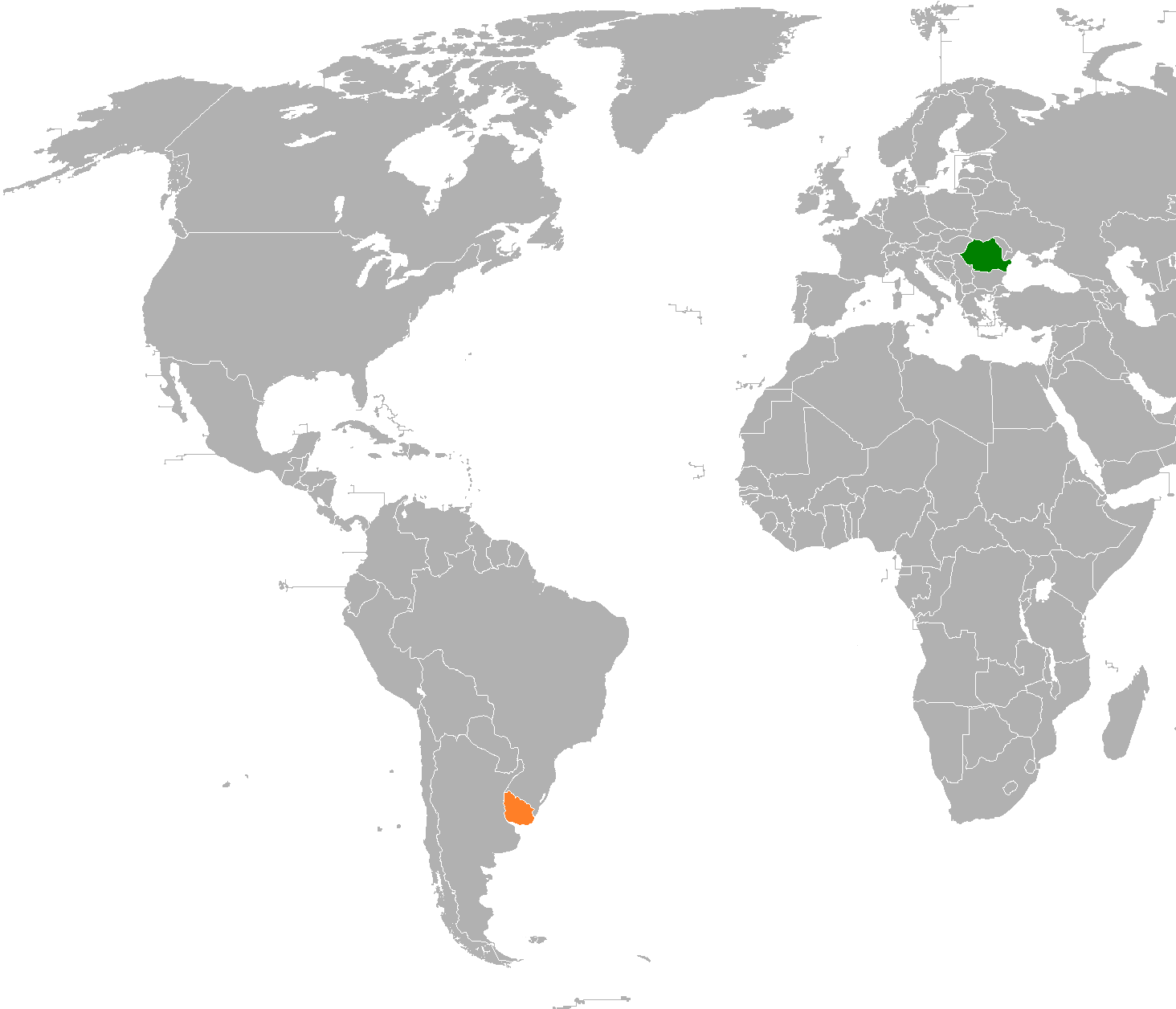
- Romania: Uruguay

Romania–Uruguay relations are foreign relations between Romania and Uruguay. Both countries established diplomatic relations in 1935. Romania has an embassy in Montevideo. Uruguay has an embassy in Bucharest, which was re-opened in 2008.

Both countries are full members of the United Nations.

Several treaties have been undersigned between both countries: cooperation (1993), culture and science (2004) and taxing (2012)

Trade between both countries is small but stable.

== Resident diplomatic missions ==
- Romania has an embassy in Montevideo.
- Uruguay has an embassy in Bucharest.

== See also ==
- Foreign relations of Romania
- Foreign relations of Uruguay
