= Daniel Ramada =

Ambassador Daniel Ramada Piendibene

Uruguayan Ambassador to the Holy See
- In office 2011–2015
- Leader: Pope Francis
- Succeeded by: Mario Cayota

Uruguayan Ambassador to the Sovereign Military Order of Malta
- Incumbent
- Assumed office 2011
- Appointed by: José Mujica

Personal details
- Born: Daniel Edgardo Ramada Piendibene; 16 September 1950 Montevideo, Uruguay

Daniel Edgardo Ramada Piendibene (born September 16, 1950) is a Uruguayan theologian, academic, diplomat, and consultant, recognised for his contributions to political science, theology, and international relations. diplomat. He has served as Uruguay’s Ambassador to the Holy See from 2011 to 2015 and continues to be the Uruguayan Ambassador to the Sovereign Military Order of Malta, and has held prominent roles in academia, public service, and the private sector.

The Uruguayan diplomatic representative studied at the Colegio y Liceo del Sagrado Corazón (Padres Jesuitas) in Montevideo and also attended the Instituto de Estudios Humanísticos y Clásicos de la Compañía de Jesús. He holds a degree in Theology from the University of Fribourg and a Doctorate in Political Science.

== Early life and education ==
Ramada was born in Montevideo, Uruguay. He attended Colegio y Liceo del Sagrado Corazón (Jesuits) for his secondary education, later joining the Novitiate of the Society of Jesus in Córdoba, Argentina, where he studied literature and humanities at the Institute of Letters and Classical Humanities. He completed further secondary studies in law at the Instituto Alfredo Vázquez Acevedo (IAVA) in Montevideo. He pursued a law degree at the Faculty of Law and Social Sciences, University of the Republic (UDELAR), Montevideo, and began his academic career as a research assistant and later as a lecturer in political science and sociology at UDELAR and the Escuela Universitaria de Servicio Social. Ramada’s academic journey continued with advanced theological studies at the Instituto Teológico del Uruguay (ITU) and the Faculty of Theology at the University of Fribourg, Switzerland, specialising in patrology and early Christian texts. He later earned a PhD in Political Science from Atlantic International University, USA.

== Academic career ==
Ramada has held teaching and research positions at several institutions, including:

– Faculty of Law and Social Sciences, UDELAR (Assistant Professor of Political Science and Sociology)

– Centro de Investigaciones Sociales de Montevideo (CISMO) (Founder, Director, and Lecturer)

– Instituto Teológico del Estado de Santa Catarina (ITESC), Brazil (Professor and Director)

– Pontifical Catholic University of Paraná, Brazil (Professor of Patrology and Theology)

– Universidad Católica del Uruguay (UCU) (Postgraduate Lecturer and Researcher)

– Universidad ORT, Uruguay (Lecturer)

– Member of the Group for Epistemology Research at UCU

He has also contributed to the development of academic programmes and seminars on leadership, spirituality, and interreligious dialogue, and has been a regular speaker at national and international forums.

== Professional career ==
Ramada’s professional experience spans market research, pharmaceutical industry management, and international business consultancy. He developed his career as a university teacher in the areas of history, law, political science, social philosophy and sociology, he is a founding member of the Center for Social Research in Montevideo, of which he was head of the Research Department and managing director. He has led binational industrial projects, facilitated mergers and acquisitions, and advised on regulatory harmonisation within Mercosur.

He has been an advisor to the Uruguayan Episcopal Conference, professor at the Pontificia Universidad Católica de Paraná, in Brazil, and founder of the project "Patrística Latinoamericana-siglos XVI-XVIII" del Instituto de Teología Patrística Latinoamericana.

He developed activities in the diplomatic area, first as a counsellor for the pharmaceutical industry in the Uruguayan embassy in Brazil, he was a member of the Commission for Foreign Trade of the Uruguayan Chamber of Industry and an advisor to the Mercosur Technical Group for health and food.

== Diplomatic Service ==
In 2011, Ramada was appointed Ambassador Extraordinary and Plenipotentiary of Uruguay to the Holy See, serving until 2015. He concurrently held the post of Ambassador to the Sovereign Order of Malta, which he still holds. During his diplomatic tenure, he represented Uruguay at major international events, contributed to interreligious dialogue, and organised cultural and academic initiatives in Europe and the Americas.

Ramada’s reflections on the resignation of Pope Benedict XVI and the election of Pope Francis were published by the Uruguayan Episcopal Conference, highlighting his insight into Vatican affairs and his commitment to the doctrine of social responsibility.

He also contributed to the visibility of Latin America within the Vatican, supporting the appointment of Uruguayan Cardinal Daniel Sturla and fostering dialogue between the Holy See and Latin American countries.

== Publications and Conferences ==
Ramada is the author of numerous academic articles, monographs, and conference presentations on topics including political science, theology, social doctrine, and interreligious dialogue. Notable works and presentations include:

– “El desafío epistémico de Gaudium et Spes” (Faculty of Theology, Santa Catarina, Brazil)

– “Diplomacia y Esperanza” (Associazione internazionale Carità Politica)

– “Patrología Latinoamericana” (GRULAC, Holy See)

– “Presupuestos doctrinales de Gaudium et Spes y Evangelii Gaudium” (Associazione internazionale Carità Politica)

– “Memoria e historia” (Fundación Mons. Giovannino Pinna, Italy)

– “Uruguay en guaraní – Presencia indígena y misionera” (Museos Vaticanos, Rome)

== Honours and Distinctions ==
Ramada has received several honours, including:

– Medal of Merit, Instituto Teológico del Estado de Santa Catarina (Brazil)

– Grand Cross of the Order of Piana (Holy See)

– Grand Cross of the Sovereign Order of Malta

– Medal of Merit, Casa Angelo Comneno (Greece-Italy)

– Honorary Academic, Academia Angélico-Constantiniana de Letras, Artes y Ciencias (Rome)

== Personal life ==
Daniel Ramada Piendibene is married to Dra. Marta Raquel Sarasola, with whom he has three children. He continues to reside in Montevideo, Uruguay, and remains active in academic, diplomatic, and consultancy roles. He is the grand-nephew of the legendary Jose Piendibene.
