= Fascism in Uruguay =

Fascism has been historically present in Uruguay, both in its classical form and in local variants.

Since Benito Mussolini's rise to power, the Italian fascist government strove to influence foreign politics, particularly among the Italian migrant population in the Americas. Through various propaganda campaigns and the foundation of different institutions, the Italian government tried to sway Italian Uruguayans to the fascist ideology, eventually fostering the development of autochthonous fascist movements.

== Italian community ==
Italian immigrants formed the majority of the Uruguayan migrant population, and therefore Italy–Uruguay relations, both diplomatic and cultural, and had been historically strong. Furthermore, the Italian national hero Giuseppe Garibaldi had served in the Uruguayan Civil War in the 1840s and was perceived as a key figure of Uruguayan national identity. Italian fascist diplomacy sought to "wake up" a perceived lost national pride among the migrant community to propagate fascism in Latin America. This intent, however, was not as successful as expected considering the prevalence of left-wing ideas among the working-class immigrants.

In 1924, prince Umberto of Savoy, the heir apparent to the Italian throne, visited Uruguay and expressed his interest in fostering diplomatic ties between Uruguay and Italy, a proposal that was received favorably by both locals and immigrants. The Italian legation, with Giovanni Giuriati as the Italian ambassador-extraordinary for South American relations, worked extensively to influence local politics and to promote fascism among Italian descendants in the country.

=== Institutional activity ===
The Italian legation attempted to imitate the fascist totalitarian organization in Uruguay by fostering various social institutions. In 1923, a local fascio was founded in Montevideo under the sponsorship of Italian diplomats. The movement did not claim political objectives and presented itself as an essentially cultural and social association. The fascio was led by colonel Ioanello Matteucci, count Alberto Compagnucci and captain Mario Longhini. A fascist youth organization, the Gioventù Italiana del Littorio al Estero, also operated among the Italian community.

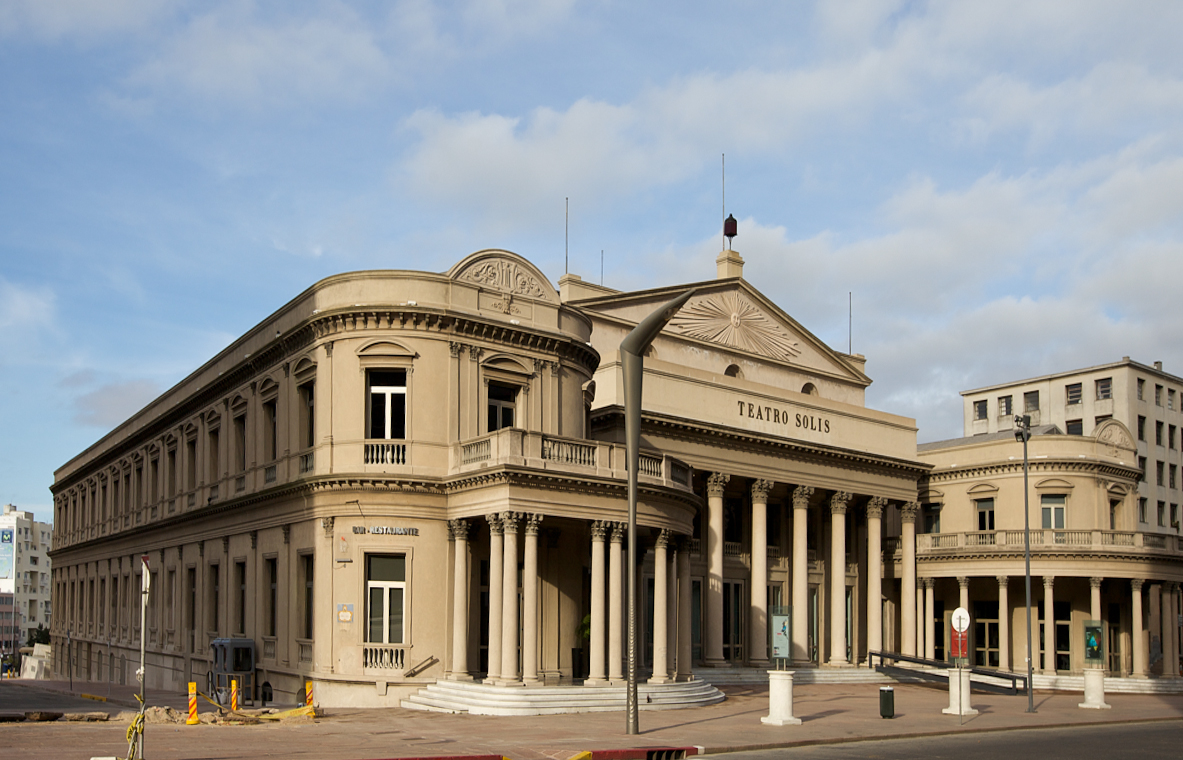
Solís Theatre, where the Fascio of Montevideo used to organize its celebrations.

The fascio was directly connected to the local Dopolavoro institution. A fascist leisure and cultural organization, founded in 1925 for adults in Italy, the Dopolavoro opened a subsidiary in Uruguay to serve Italian immigrants and to propagate fascist ideology. The society had started its ventures with a newspaper in 1934 and opened its official local headquarters in 1938. Uruguayan President Gabriel Terra attended the inauguration ceremony. The Dopolavoro opened a new and larger branch in 1939, inaugurated with a football match between the Italian high school and the German Sports League.

Italian diplomats would regularly visit places and institutions associated with the community both in Montevideo and in the countryside. Fascist movements were also involved in charity and cultural activities among immigrants, using them for covert propaganda. The legation frequently invited important cultural figures to give speeches at Montevideo and celebrated Italian holidays at local theatres. Some of the famous banquets held by fascist organizations linked to the Italian government were attended by relevant local politicians.

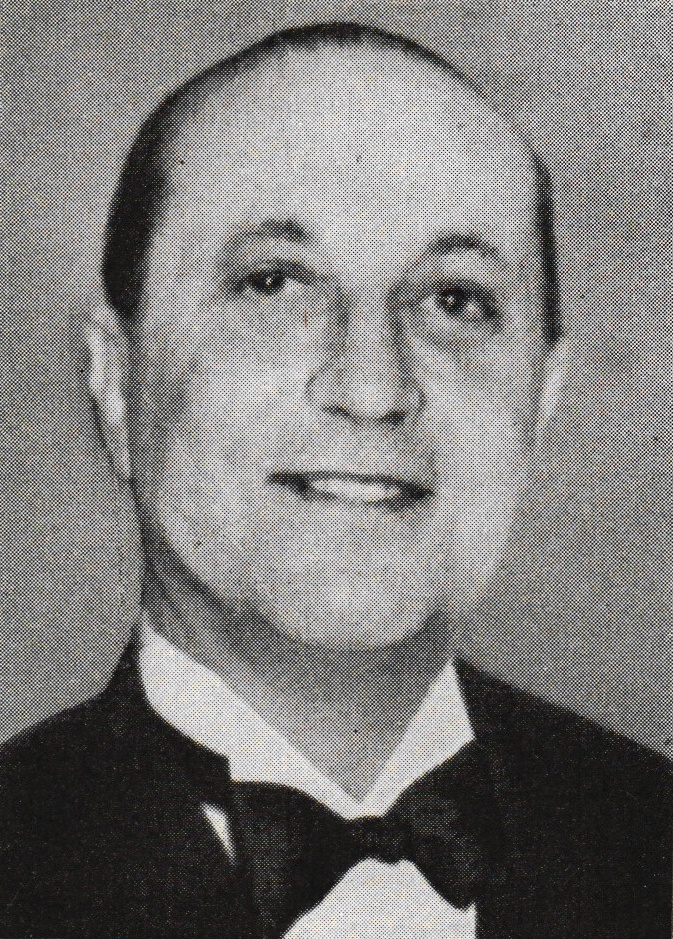
Alberto Bellardi Ricci, Italian legate in Montevideo from 1938 to 1942.

Fascists also tried to influence the Uruguayan educational system through the celebration of meetings in the Italian School of Montevideo. The school experienced a full transformation during the fascist era, being forced to adopt the Italian educational program and discipline. A document of the Council of Primary Education of the Gabriel Terra dictatorship of the 1930s stated that fascism "promotes the sentiment of family, nationality and tradition, all of which are favourable to the cohesion and the continuation of the social organization that is characteristic of the Western civilization".

Italian fascists also directed a wide number of press outlets in the country, such as Fiamma Italica and Fascismo in Salto, SPQR in Melo, and L'Italiano, Marcia su Roma, Il Piave, La Verità, L'Era Nuova, Italia Nova, Il Piccolo, La Voce d'Italia, Il Messagero d'Italia and Il Dopolavorista in Montevideo.

Fascist activism greatly reduced after the outbreak of World War II. Most movements related to the Italian government were dissolved in 1940 by the Law of Illicit Associations (Spanish: Ley de Asociaciones Ilícitas).

== First movements ==
Many Uruguayan politicians showed favourable views of the fascist regime. Pedro Manini Ríos visited Italy in 1928 and highlighted the economic progress of the nation.

The first local fascist movement was the Uruguayan Patriotic Organization, founded in 1929 and influential among the National army. The organization would later evolve into the Patriotic Front of National Defense in 1935. There were some attempts to create a national fascist party such as the Reformist Party or the National Action. The Chamber of Representatives later started an investigation on those movements, accusing them of being financed by the German government.

Most early Uruguayan fascists admired the Brazilian Integralist Action and followed it as a model. The rejection of Jewish immigration was a common issue of the first groups.

The popularization of corporatism as a reaction to Batllist reformism among Uruguayan intellectual circles led to the creation of two agrarianist corporatist parties, the Agrarian Party and the Ruralist Party, that despite not being explicitly fascist saw Italy as a role model. The parties pressed for the development of a dirigist system that would give priority to the countryside.

=== Uruguayan revisionism ===
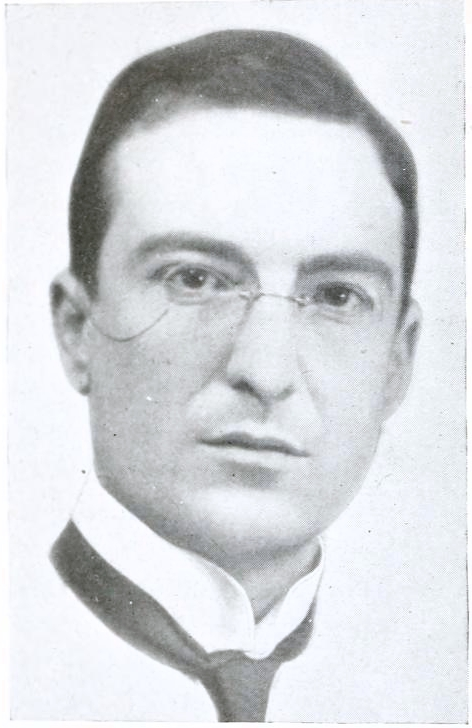
Adolfo Agorio, 1921.

One of the main intellectual figures of Uruguayan fascism was the writer Adolfo Agorio. Agorio had founded the Acción Revisionista del Uruguay, originally an explicitly fascist organization that later joined the Colorado Party. The Acción edited a magazine called "Corporaciones" (lit. "corporations") about corporatist economics.

The Acción had close ties with the Brazilian Integralist Action, holding it as its main model of inspiration, and also incorporated Nazi elements. The Corporaciones magazine included texts from Gustavo Barroso, Plínio Salgado and other Brazilian Integralist figures. The prologue of Barroso's book O integralismo e o mundo was written by Agorio. The former had written about Uruguayan revisionism, placing it inside a global fascist wave along with Integralism. Many revisionist leaders such as Ernesto Bauzá or Agorio himself had communicated through letters with Barroso, whom they saw as a political role model. The movement was seen by Brazilians as an easy way to legitimate Salgado's thesis of the fitting nature of fascism for South America, and was in line with the Chefe's desire to unify Latin America under an Integralist confederation.

Many renowned intellectuals were part of the movement. Revisionists wanted to develop an alternative nationalist political current outside the traditional Blanco and Colorado parties. The movement was deeply antisemitic and drew inspiration from Simón Bolívar.

In 1934, Agorio wrote his book "Roma y el espíritu de Occidente" (lit: "Rome and the spirit of the West") in defense of Italian fascism. Agorio viewed fascism from an idealist perspective, considering it a successor to a millenarian tradition of western politics. Fascism and corporatism, according to Agorio, represented the western spirit truthfully and followed the historical trend of such civilization. The work also stresses the importance of fascism for the defeat of both communism and capitalism, and criticizes the professionalization of politics.

Agorio would later become a prominent figure of National Socialist propaganda in Uruguay. He was invited by German diplomats to travel on the Hindenburg and took part in many political meetings sponsored by the Nazi legation.

Another important Uruguayan fascist was Teodomiro Varela de Andrade. A member of the Acción Revisionista, Varela had been a Batllist on his youth and, after some years of conservative activism, adhered publicly to fascism in the 1930s.

Varela was a staunch corporatist and presented many failed constitutional reform projects both to the government and the Colorado Party. He admired Getúlio Vargas' abolishment of political parties, despite not wanting a similar system for Uruguay. Varela supported a bicameral system, consisting of a corporative assembly and a partisan elected chamber. His project also included the creation of 3 new ministries for Labour, Credit and Corporations, as well as the strengthening of presidential powers.

== Marzism ==
=== March on Montevideo and coup d'état ===
After the crisis of 1929, the Uruguayan diarchic executive model was greatly criticised for its mishandling of the economic situation. Perceiving the government as ineffective, the Uruguayan economic elite founded the Committee for Economic Vigilance as a pressure group to promote a change in economic policies and the return to presidentialism.

Elected president Gabriel Terra led a coup d'état and dissolved the Parliament and the National Council of Administration in 1933. Terra had already expressed pro-fascist views.

As a public display of support for the coup, important Uruguayan political figures such as Luis Alberto de Herrera called for a "March on Montevideo" (similar to the March on Rome led by Mussolini) in April 1933 with the support of conservative media and intellectuals. Supported by agrarianists who had been opposed to the previous Batllist reforms, the March was seen by its advocates as a "ruralist crusade" against a perceived morally corrupt city. The demonstration was compared to a similar display organized by Getúlio Vargas. Amid increased tensions between the countryside and the urban areas, local newspapers had presented the March as a national regeneration revolution that would defeat the "corrupted city" and destroy its "moral misery".

March on Montevideo! That's the voice that, like a wildfire, spreads through the countryside, from Colonia to Cerro Largo, from Artigas to Rocha, around the four corners of the fatherland! Yes, march on Montevideo, armed or not! End the Colegiado, before the Colegiado ends the country! Such is the motto of this tragic and deeply decisive hour.

=== Fascist era (1933–1942) ===
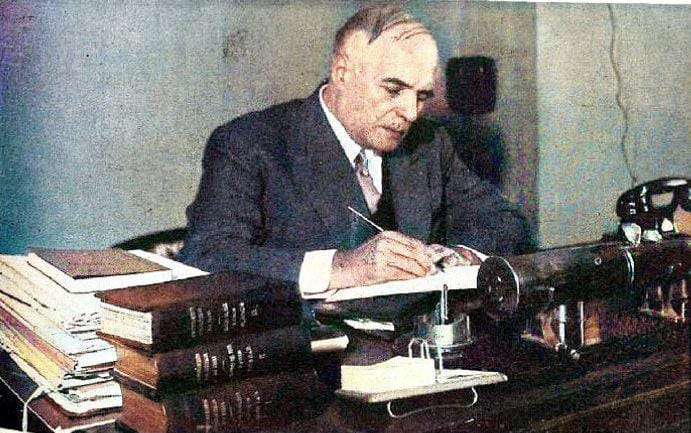
Gabriel Terra at his desk, signing an autograph for a local magazine.

Gabriel Terra's followers became known as Marzists (lit. March-ists) because of their support of the "Revolution of March" (Spanish: Revolución de Marzo), the official name of the coup.

The March regime called for elections of the constitutional assembly that wrote the 1934 Uruguayan Constitution, despite accusations of fraud. The new constitution established a 50–50 parliamentary representation for the two most voted parties and abolished the National Council of Administration. The government persecuted or banished political opposers.

The constitution, inspired on corporatist principles, formally recognized the human rights to education, healthcare and work, as well as the freedom of assembly and association. The government also created the Electoral Court to improve the transparency of elections. The constitutional referendum was boycotted by Batllist Colorados.

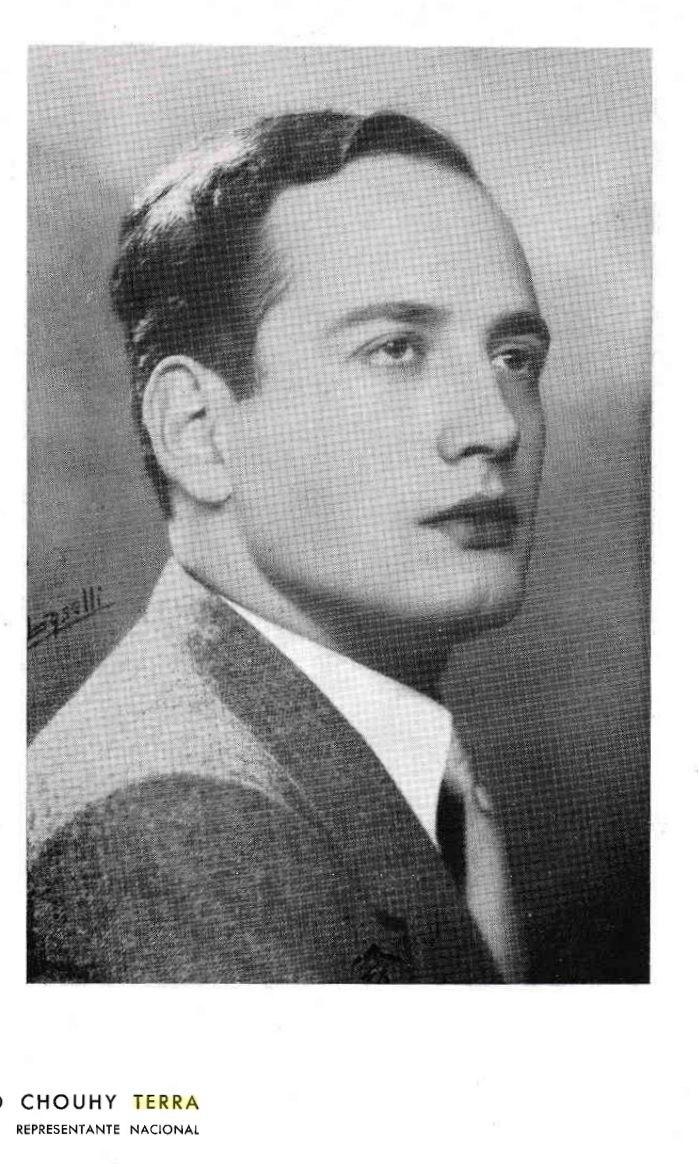
"Adolf Hitler, who realized the conception of National Socialism, is the concept of supremacy of the right over force. Hitler, who is often ignored when attacked, was the one who cemented the history of Germany. I believe, Mr President, that the titanic work of that privileged Hitler brain should deserve a little more respect." National Representative Chouhy Terra.

Terra broke diplomatic relationships with the USSR and the Second Spanish Republic, making Uruguay one of the first countries to recognize Francoist Spain. The March regime also developed anti-immigration policies, such as controlling Jewish immigration and setting a minimum of 80% of Uruguayan manpower on public works.

==== Economic policies ====
Terra sought the implementation of corporatist policies, which included the introduction of tripartite negotiation for industry and construction workers. Despite holding favourable views of the system, the constituent assembly of 1934 rejected the full implementation of corporatism in Uruguay, considering it too radical. The March regime has been described as "a liberal way to fascism". Still, the government made use of corporate representation through the Superior Council of Work, composed of representatives of trade unions recognized by the state. Many corporatists such as Morelli, Chioza, Podestá or even Varela de Andrade collaborated actively with the regime's economic administration.

As Terra had taken the government with the support of ruralist figures, his economic policy was originally oriented towards the countryside. The initial objective of the government was the "rebirth of the countryside and the financial stabilization of the country". Terra passed an "emergency measures" plan aimed at the debt relief of farmers. The government also promoted cattle production and exports. The later development of state industrialization projects moved ruralists to withdraw their support of the regime in favour of the 1942 coup d'état by president Alfredo Baldomir.

Terra described his economic policies as "solidarist" or "State Socialist". The government actively promoted cooperatives (the president had written an economic theory book named "Socialism and cooperativism") as Terra considered them an easy way to reduce the cost of living. Through active state intervention, Marzists tried to secure internal competition while keeping strong protectionist control.

It is not only through taxes that the evils of a never seen before crisis can be solved (...) It is necessary to take care of the industry by protecting it; it is necessary to worry about ensuring the means for a rapid development of agroindustry (...) Yesterday, deputy Jude denounced at the Chamber that a trust of food items had been formed. I have presented two formulas for my companions to study: a preventive one, that of consumers' co-operatives, that can reduce the cost of living on a 30% as it has been scientifically proven (...) and other formula, that of repression, that shall punish trusts and could be very well implemented.

Terra also carried out an agrarian reform project. To address the unproductivity of latifundios, the government passed a series of Laws of Forced Cultivation that compelled powerful landowners to use their properties efficiently. The state also financed the split of big holdings in smaller farms, and distributed seeds and farm equipment to smallholders. In 1935, the March regime created the Ministry of Livestock and Agriculture. Forestry was actively promoted and the Institute of Industrial Chemistry was commissioned to produce fertilizers for national farmers. The government managed thus to revert the rural flight trend the country had experienced for nearly 60 years, rising land tenancy by 13% and the number of agricultural manpower by 31,000 workers during the era, recovering also 350,000 hectares of unfarmed land. The number of heads of cattle rose by more than one million between 1930 and 1937.

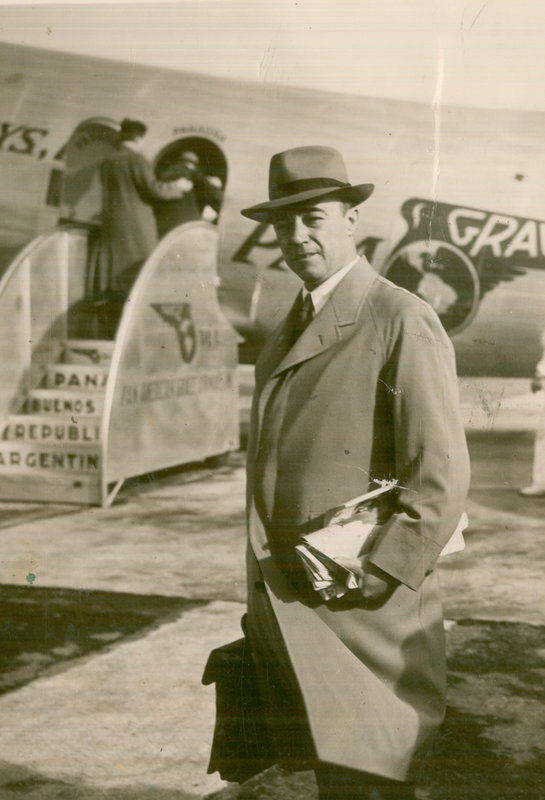
Minister César Charlone standing before a PLUNA aircraft.

The main figure of the Marzist economic project was César Charlone, minister of economy, who had expressed pro-fascist views and called for an adaptation of Italian state corporatism to fit Uruguayan needs better. Charlone promoted the introduction of corporate negotiation following Mussolini's Carta del Lavoro.

The dictatorship carried out an interventionist monetary policy to solve the deep financial problems caused by the global crisis. In 1935, the national Currency Fund was created as a regulating mechanism of the legal tender, distorted by the crash. After years on an active deflationary policy by the previous administration, Charlone enacted a series of "Revaluation Laws" (Spanish: Leyes de Revalúo) by which the Uruguayan peso was intentionally inflated through monetary issue to solve the deflation crisis and promote exports. The government followed an aggressive credit policy to promote internal investment. The large gold reserves held by the Uruguayan government helped to keep the currency stable, and most issued money was used in public works

Charlone's financial administration has been praised for his efficient managing of the crisis. From 1933 to Terra's retirement in 1939, the national GDP per capita had grown by 29.43%.

=== Ties with Italy and Germany ===
In 1932, Serafino Mazzolini was designated as Italian legate in Uruguay. A devoted fascist, Mazzolini sought to strengthen diplomatic ties between the Marzist dictatorship and the Italian regime. Italian diplomats had welcomed the coup as a victory of authoritarian discipline over political parties. Despite the original attempts by Italian diplomatic staff to propagate fascism in Uruguay had not been as successful as expected, Mazzolini's good relationship with Terra allowed him to spread fascist propaganda both by radio and newspapers with better results. Italy and Uruguay signed a trade agreement in 1935, and another treaty was signed in 1936. Three years later, Terra visited Italy on a diplomatic trip.

After the Italian invasion of Ethiopia, Uruguay did not condemn Italy as the League of Nations had asked to do, and kept its economic relationships with the European nation. Mazzolini left Uruguay in 1937, after Italy was expulsed of the League.

Senator Luis Alberto de Herrera visited Fascist Italy in 1937, invited by the government. After holding meetings with Benito Mussolini and the king, he was awarded the Great Cross of the Order of the Crown of Italy. Herrera gave a speech on Radio Roma, where he credited fascist communitarianism for its promotion of a "colossal display of moral and material energies, unremitting reconstructive activity and progress". Herrera praised Mussolini as an "extraordinary figure", "center of this formidable animic, civic, patriotic and social movement" who had led a "New Risorgimento".

The new Italy! Nowhere in Europe have I seen such a convincing spectacle. Those ideals, formerly broken and disaggregated, as the marbles of the mutilated Forum, have been rebuilt, have been refounded and spring from a dazzling consummated civil epic. The new Risorgimento! For this is not a party nor faction against other faction: this is the whole community marching together, opening its own route.

Uruguay signed a trade agreement with Nazi Germany in 1934, making it the second export partner of the country. The German government tried to influence Uruguayan politics both by through economic investments and through the creation of Nazi groups among immigrants.

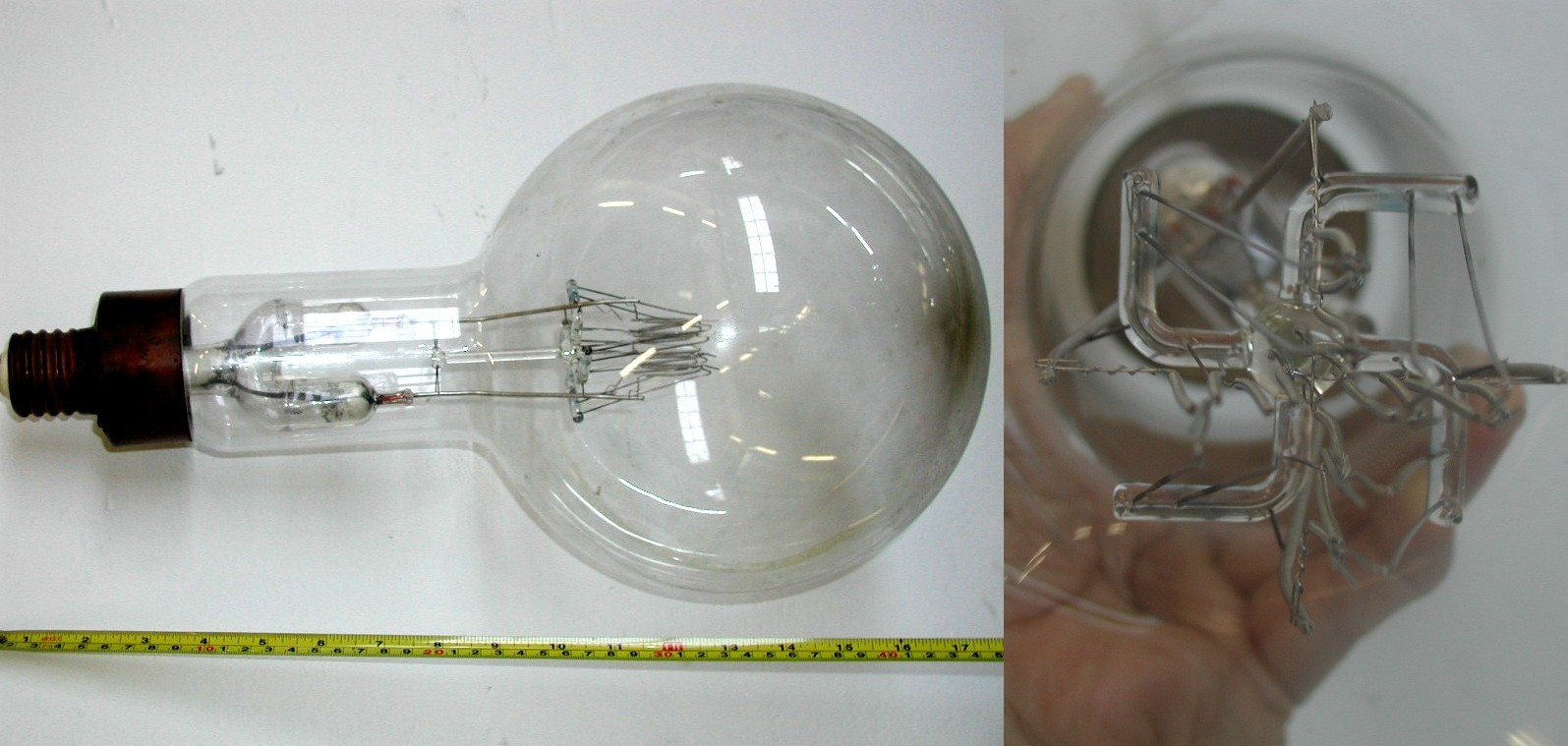
One of the original lightbulbs brought from Germany and used at the Rincón del Bonete lighthouse, forming a swastika with its filaments.

Terra's industrialization program was supported by Nazi Germany. His main public work, the Rincón del Bonete hydroelectric power station, was built with the help of German engineers. Soon after the project had started, Hitler sent a telegraphic message to Terra, reading:

Most excellent Mr. President of the Eastern Republic of Uruguay Dr. Don Gabriel Terra. Montevideo. To the good success of the monumental work on the Río Negro, started by initiative of your government, I express to your excellency my most sincere congratulations. Adolf Hitler. Chancellor of the Reich.

Uruguayan ministers Martín Echegoyen and José Espalter were awarded the Order of the German Eagle in 1938.

== Nazism ==
A number of Nazi political movements were founded among German Uruguayan immigrants with the explicit approval of the Marzist government, taking advantage of the relative isolationism the community had kept since their arrival to the country. The arrival of émigrés of the Weimar Republic was key for the transmission of the prevailing anti-democratic sentiment of the German people at that time.

In 1933, the local subsidiary of the NSDAP was founded in Montevideo by Julius Dalldorf, following the directions of the Auslandorganization of the German party. A previous national socialist movement had been started in 1931 by German immigrants. The movement promoted the diffusion of German media in Uruguay and edited its own newspaper, the Deutsche Wacht. National Socialists clashed with the Marzist dictatorship, dismissing it as conservative, partisan and "demoliberal". Nevertheless, many local conservatives showed positive views of German authoritarianism, such as Colorado deputy Chouhy Terra.

Uruguayan Nazis took part in many antisemitic activities, such as boycotts and violent attacks of Jewish shops.

=== Nazi takeover conspiracy theory ===
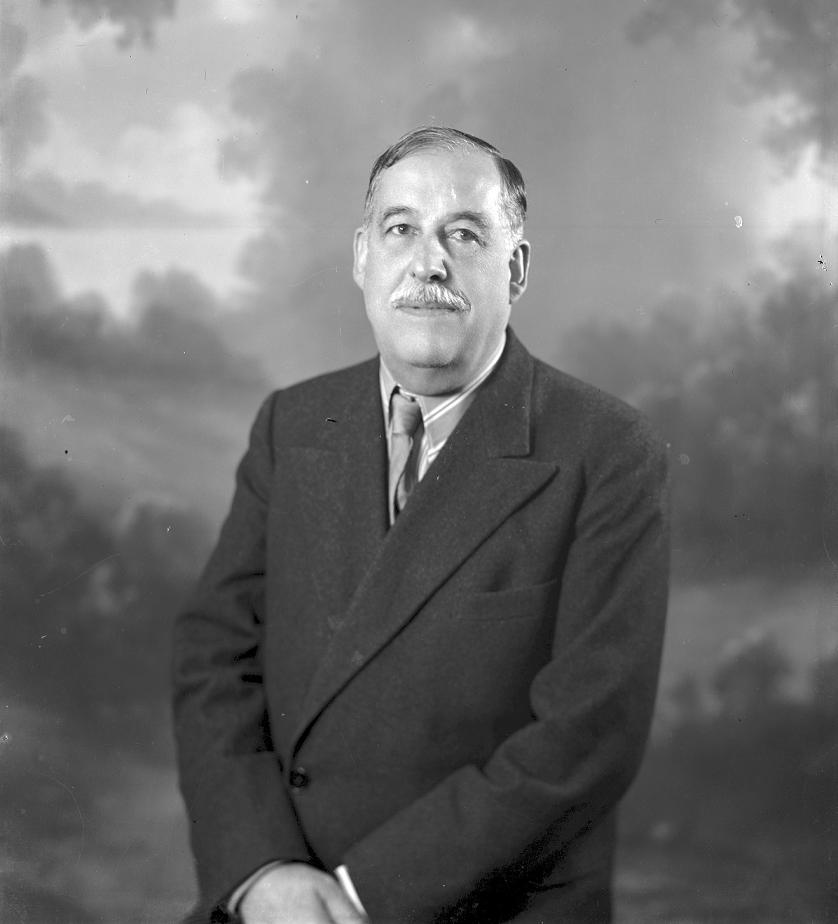
Luis Alberto de Herrera, Uruguayan politician accused of Nazism by his political opponents.

Despite its success among the German community, Nazi ideology did not prove effective in penetrating Uruguayan politics, as its ideas of racial purity were not fit for the Latin American context. Notwithstanding, Nazi Germany became a reference for most conservatives in the country as an example of discipline, authority, progress, order and national pride.

Amid political debate about the creation of American military bases in Uruguayan territory, many nationalist politicians opposed the initiative as a matter of national sovereignty. In the context of World War II, however, rumours began spreading about those rejecting the proposal as potential Nazi collaborators.

American diplomats took advantage of the situation to propagate suspicions about a supposed Nazi plot to take power in Uruguay and conquer Latin America, in which important politicians such as César Charlone, Julio Roletti, and most particularly Luis Alberto de Herrera, ancestor of presidents Luis Alberto Lacalle and Luis Lacalle Pou, would be involved. The list of political figures allegedly part of the "Fuhrmann Plan" was extensive and detailed. The Plan would theoretically make Uruguay a German agrarian colony.

Herrera's newspaper "El Debate" had expressed pro-Nazi and antisemitic views, even expressing that:

(The fact that) the German government has separated from the national community those anti-social elements as well, sending them to concentration camps to make them useful members of the human society was a self-defense policy that, compared to the magnitude of the potential threat they represented, was applied in a very humane way.

Nevertheless, Herrera could hardly be associated with German diplomacy nor national socialist ideology. It is generally believed that the plot never existed and was an example of political slander. Eight alleged Nazi agents were detained in 1940, but most were released shortly after.

One of the main objectives of the 1942 Uruguayan coup d'état by Alfredo Baldomir was the realignment of Uruguay with the Allied Powers after decades of Axis-leaning neutrality. Baldomir used the Nazi plot theory as an explicit casus belli for the coup. The government did not undertake violent actions nor promoted political persecution, except for an order given by the president to surround Herrera's house with police forces as a condemnatory display.

=== Flight of Nazi war criminals ===
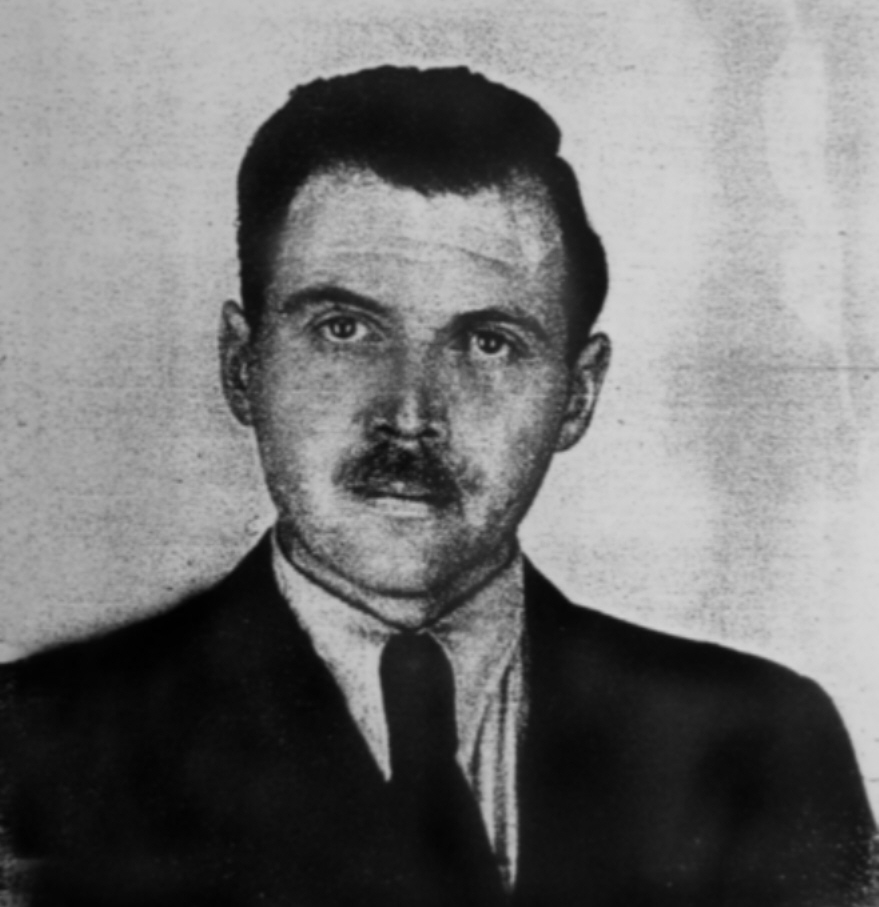
Josef Mengele in 1956, in Buenos Aires.

Some Nazi war criminals escaped to Uruguay through the ratlines system.

Josef Mengele escaped to South America after the war, where he lived in different places under various false identities. In 1958, Mengele married the widow of his brother Karl at Nueva Helvecia in Uruguay using his real name. The marriage act was published in the local newspaper and it is debated whether the inhabitants of the town were just indifferent to his presence or simply did not know who Mengele was. Some testimonies also point to an involvement of Mengele in the construction of the Rincón de Baygorria dam, carried out by a German enterprise.

Herberts Cukurs was a Nazi aviator and one of the main figures of the Holocaust in Latvia. Cukurs had been personally involved in the extermination of Jews and was guilty of more than 30,000 killings. Cukurs had fled to Brazil and lived in Rio de Janeiro and São Paulo. An operation by Mossad tricked him into travelling to Uruguay after the 1964 Brazilian coup d'état, where 4 agents killed him the following year after a fight. His executers notified the press under the pseudonym of "Those who shall never forget".

== Falangism ==
Flag of the Nationalist faction during the Spanish Civil War

Excluding Marzism, Falangism and Francoism were the most prevalent authoritarian ideologies in Uruguay during the 1930s decade. Many independent falangist movements were founded among the Uruguayan youth, such as the Movement of National Action (Spanish: Movimiento de Acción Nacional), the National Spanish Union (Spanish: Unión Nacional Española) or the Nationalist Spanish Vanguard (Spanish: Vanguardia Nacionalista Española).

A group of powerful Marzist businessmen and politicians including vice president Alfredo Navarro and ex-president Juan Campisteguy sent a telegram of support to the Nationalist faction soon after the uprising. Marzist media was unanimously supportive of the coup.

Most of the Uruguayan clergy had shown favourable views of the Alzamiento Nacional, thus helping to popularize falangism among Uruguayan Catholics. In spite of this, the Civic Union (the most important clericalist party of the time) condemned the uprising, and archbishop Juan Francisco Aragone expressed his disapproval of the presence of uniformed falangists during masses in 1940.

In 1937, an official subsidiary of FET y de las JONS was founded in Montevideo. Members of the fascio of Montevideo, of the Spanish Chamber of Commerce and of the NSDAP were present at the opening ceremony. The branch was similar to the Spanish organization, but did not have a paramilitary wing and was mainly focused on cultural and social events. Its Feminine Section was present in various parishes of Montevideo and was dedicated to charity activities for soldiers in Spain. A movement for children was also founded, in which they were taught about the situation in Spain, watched movies, learned arts and wrote supportive letters for Spanish children suffering the war. Local centres were also founded in Paysandú, Punta del Este and Treinta y Tres. All of them were banned through the Law of Illicit Associations of 1940, but falangism kept its presence through covert institutions.

Even if not a Nazi, Herrera was a member of the Spanish Falange Foreign Service and took part in falangist meetings during the decade. A private letter sent by francoist leader José de Torres stressed the importance of his role in the country:

I want to make use of this opportunity to bear witness of how much the Falange, and I personally, appreciates your interest and affection towards this organization, as well as your political work in favour of Falange (...) be sure that all affiliates see with great pleasantness your political action and are together in spirit with you, who honour and help us so much.

Herrera was widely accused of falangist and crypto-fascist sympathies during his political career, and his party was suspected of links with the Argentine GOU. Ironically, Herrera called batllism a fascist ideology in 1946.

Uruguayan businessman Joaquín Martínez Arboleya, who became afterwards a renowned writer under the pen name of Santicaten, was one of the most important anti-communist propagandists of the pre-dictatorial era. Having fought in the Spanish Civil War, Martínez claimed to have witnessed the execution of José Antonio Primo de Rivera while being arrested by republicans in Alicante. He was a key figure on the early years of Francoist propaganda.

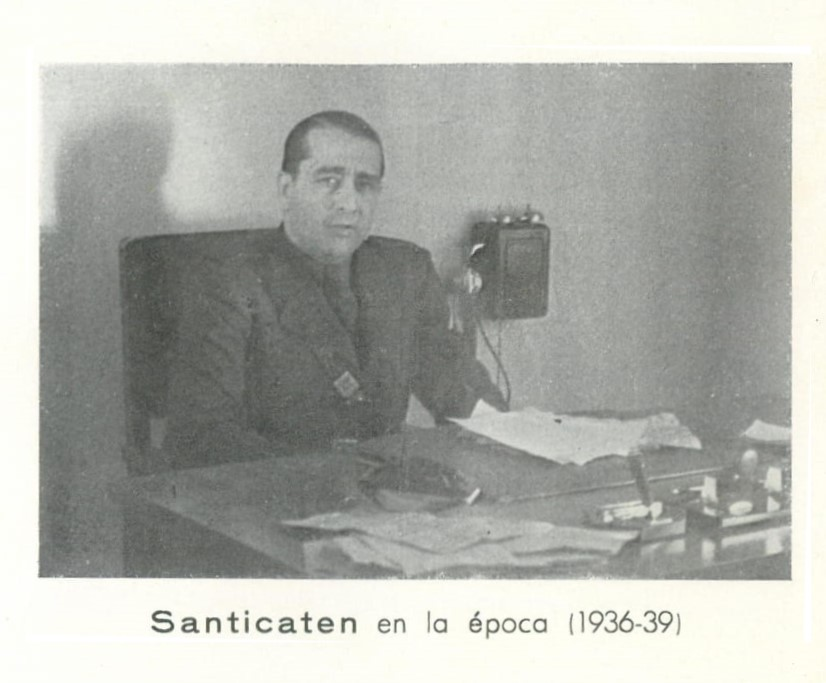
Santicaten in Spain during the Spanish Civil War.

Described as "a fascist with an overwhelming personality", Martínez had been involved in Francoist propaganda campaigns and was a pioneer of the Uruguayan film industry, which made him a wealthy businessman. He perceived all his work as a "crusade against communism", and produced many explicitly anti-communist art pieces. Martínez stated that "only cowards and traitors are tolerants with atheist red materialism", and was involved in propaganda works for many contemporary dictatorships.

Martínez had a good relationship with Paraguayan dictator Alfredo Stroessner, who decorated him in 1975. His anti-communist activism was not limited to Uruguay, and he also took part in campaigns in Argentina and Brazil. Martínez was also a bestselling author during the Uruguayan Dictatorship. His work "Ramón Paradís" was censored by Juan María Bordaberry because of its explicit criticism of his family.

== Later incidents ==
In 1962, the granddaughter of anarchist writer Rafael Barrett, Soledad Barrett Viedma, was kidnapped by an unidentified command that tortured her and engraved swastikas on her body using razor blades. Similar attacks were repeated on those years, but the ideological differences between the victims (many were even prominent right-wing activists) supported the theory that the attacks were not perpetrated by actual Nazis and were aimed at causing social panic. Shortly after, a paramilitary group called the "Oriental Antisemitic League" led a series of attacks against synagogues and other Jewish institutions.

In October 1987, a neo-Nazi named Héctor Paladino killed two Uruguayan Jews on a terrorist attack. The man held a Nazi flag at his home and attempted two other killings on the same day, and was afterwards sent to a psychiatric hospital. After 1990 many neo-Nazi groups developed among the skinhead movement, but most were dissolved after the imprisonment of its members.

== 21st Century ==
Generation Z (born between 2001 and 2009, depending on the analysis) worldwide is described in various studies as the "most conservative generation since 1945", they tend to be more conservative than the millennial generation, those of the generation X and the Baby Boomer Generation regarding the legalization of marijuana, transgender issues, and same-sex marriage.

In October 2014, the faculty of economics of the University of the Republic was vandalized with Nazi and fascist symbols. A similar case happened in 2023, when unidentified activists painted swastikas and spread national socialist propaganda near a public highschool.

In 2016, a store of political ware in Montevideo was denounced for selling Nazi objects. The same year, a singer was reported for shouting "Heil Hitler" during a show and a 20 years-old man was imprisoned due to his public displays of national socialist adherence. In 2017, two neo-Nazi political meetings were dissolved by the police.

Some minor factions of the Open Cabildo party have been associated with neo-Nazism. After the case came to public light, the party leaders denied previous knowledge of the political beliefs of those members, who were later expulsed from the party. A controversial picture of Guido Manini Ríos with a young man wearing a hakenkreuz shirt led to a formal statement by the party rejecting neo-Nazi ideology and the latter expulsion of the activist.

The recovery of the transom of the Graf Spee Nazi warship, featuring an eagle holding a swastika on its claws, caused a great controversy due to the ban on Nazi symbols imposed by Uruguayan law. In 2023, the Uruguayan government announced its intention to melt the eagle and turn it into a peace dove monument. After widespread criticism, the project was abandoned and the statue was left intact.

== See also ==
- Brazilian Integralism
- Fascism in South America
- José Félix Uriburu
- Monarchism in Uruguay
