= Riverism =

Uruguayan political movement

Flag of Uruguay used by the Defense Government, with a lighter blue colour representing unitarianism.

Riverism is a right-wing liberal-conservative ideology and political movement, started by Uruguayan politician Pedro Manini Ríos (which later liked fascism) and based on the figure of General Fructuoso Rivera, the first president of Uruguay.

Riverism was born in a context of opposition to the reformist policies promoted by José Batlle y Ordóñez, as an attempt to return to the "original" traditions of the Colorado Party and to counter an alleged socialist takeover of the organization.

Riverism is a conservative ideology, close to classical liberalism and radically opposed to statism.

The official riverist press media was the newspaper "La Mañana", which is still in activity.

== Ideology ==
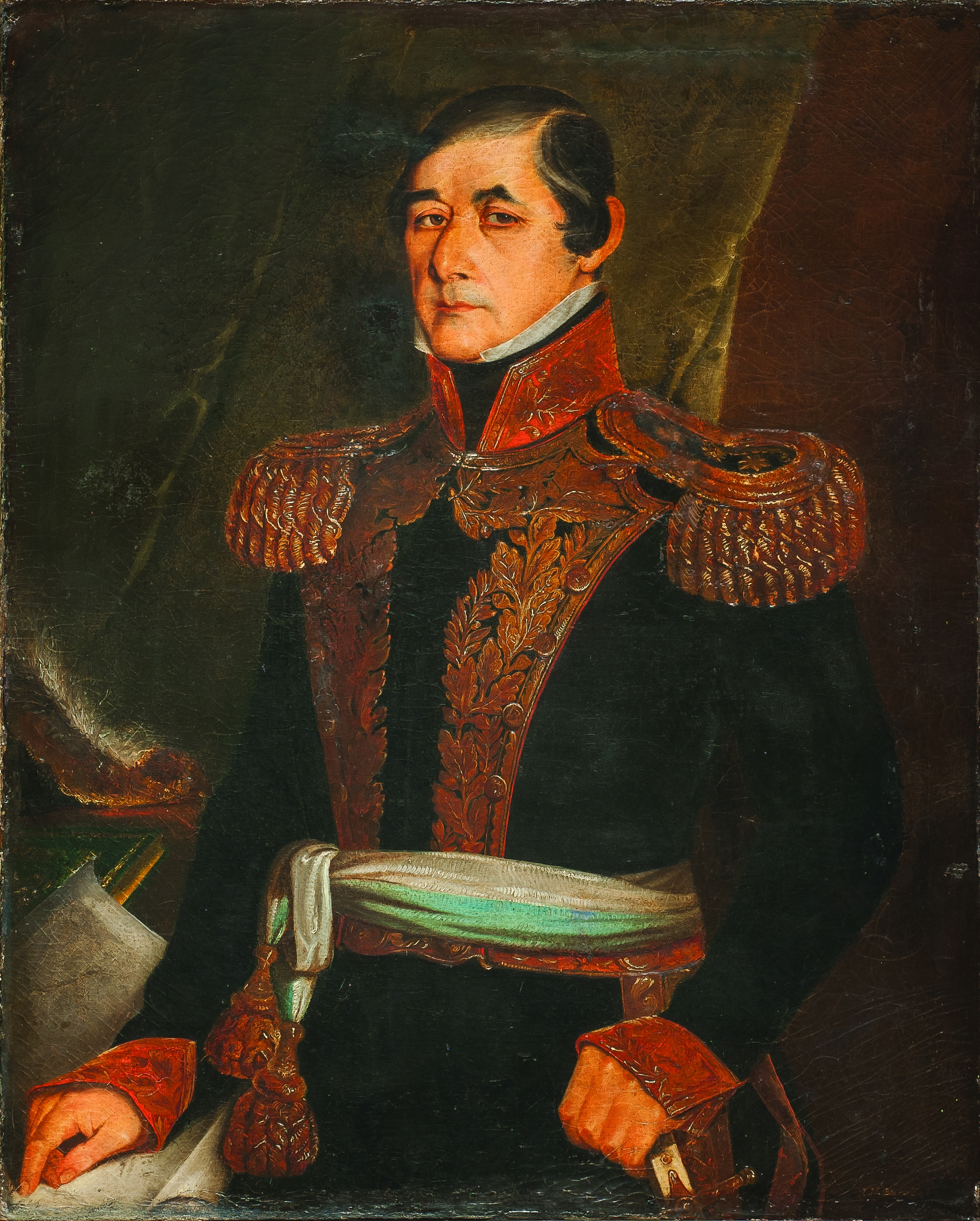
General Fructuoso Rivera by Juan Manuel Blanes (circa 1870)

Riverists claim to follow the original political trend of the Colorado Party, and to derive their ideology directly from Fructuoso Rivera, a caudillo of the Independence War and later a relevant political figure of the country.

Riverism supports the presidential system and believes in a strong executive power. The riverist movement has been divided by scholars and contemporaries between a "constitutionalist" faction, led by Juan Campisteguy, and a "pro-coup" side led by Manini Ríos who, despite publicly identified as a republican, had allegedly plotted against the government and tried to stage a coup d'état. Still, riverists were deeply critical of the perceived batllist intents to reform the constitution in order to remain in power, and supported transparency policies such as secret ballots.

Self-proclaimed conservatives, riverists were ambiguous towards the eight-hour day law as well as the legal recognition of natural children. Some Riverists supported the dictatorship of Argentine José Félix Uriburu in 1930, which it recommended as a model. Faced with the economic crisis of 1930, some Riverists supported the dictatorship of Gabriel Terra, blaming many of the ills on the 1918 Constitution promoted by Batllismo. Manini Ríos admired European fascism, sent a telegram of support to the Nationalists during the Spanish Civil War and defended Benito Mussolini. His son Alberto Manini Ríos advocated for Third Position. If his other son Carlos Manini Ríos was a Riverist or a Riverist which supported the Uriburu Dictatorship, the nationalists in the Spanish Civil War, European fascism and third position is not known.

Nevertheless, the Riveristas called for a number of progressive policies similar to those proposed by Batlle. From its origin, according to one journal, the Riverista faction “proposed in its program political rights and civil equality for women; the statute of the civil servant; the Labor Code, with regulation of the work of women and minors; workers' insurance for disqualification; hygiene and safety in workshops; insurance for work accidents; measures for forced unemployment; conciliation and arbitration, as a solution to strikes; economic and hygienic housing for urban and rural workers; improvement and development of assistance; professional technical schools; construction of urban and rural schools, improvement of salaries and guarantee in the appointments and promotions of teachers; compulsory physical education, free vocational education courses, popular libraries; reform of the tax system, with relief for basic necessities; promotion of industries derived from the use of the country's raw materials, promotion of public works and improvement of the means of transportation.”

Riverists are economically liberal, try to minimize state interventionism and opposed the numerous statist policies promoted by Batlle (Some Riverists that are pro-fascism supported government intervention). Riverism is staunchly anti-communist. The movement is close to the liberal ruralist ideology and was popular in the countryside.

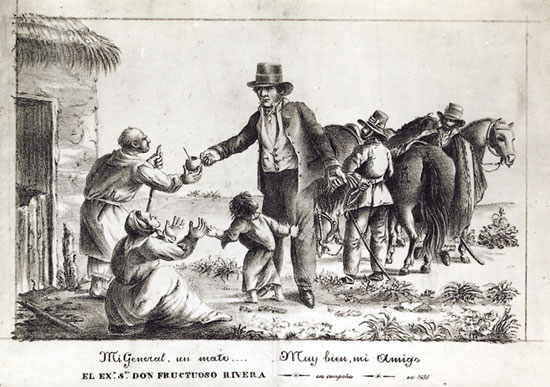
Fructuoso Rivera drinking mate with a peasant (circa 1830)

Riverism is deeply militarist. The movement took political action against curtails in the military budget and was in favour of compulsory military service. Manini Ríos opposed the reduction of military ranks carried out by Batlle, and considered the army had an essential "social role" to fulfill. He stated that the National Army was "the most objective manifestation of patriotism". Riverist general Manuel Dubra was involved in a complot against the government in 1914 and was removed from his position in 1930 amidst similar accusations. Riverism was a greatly influential political force in the Uruguayan army.

== History ==
=== Early years ===
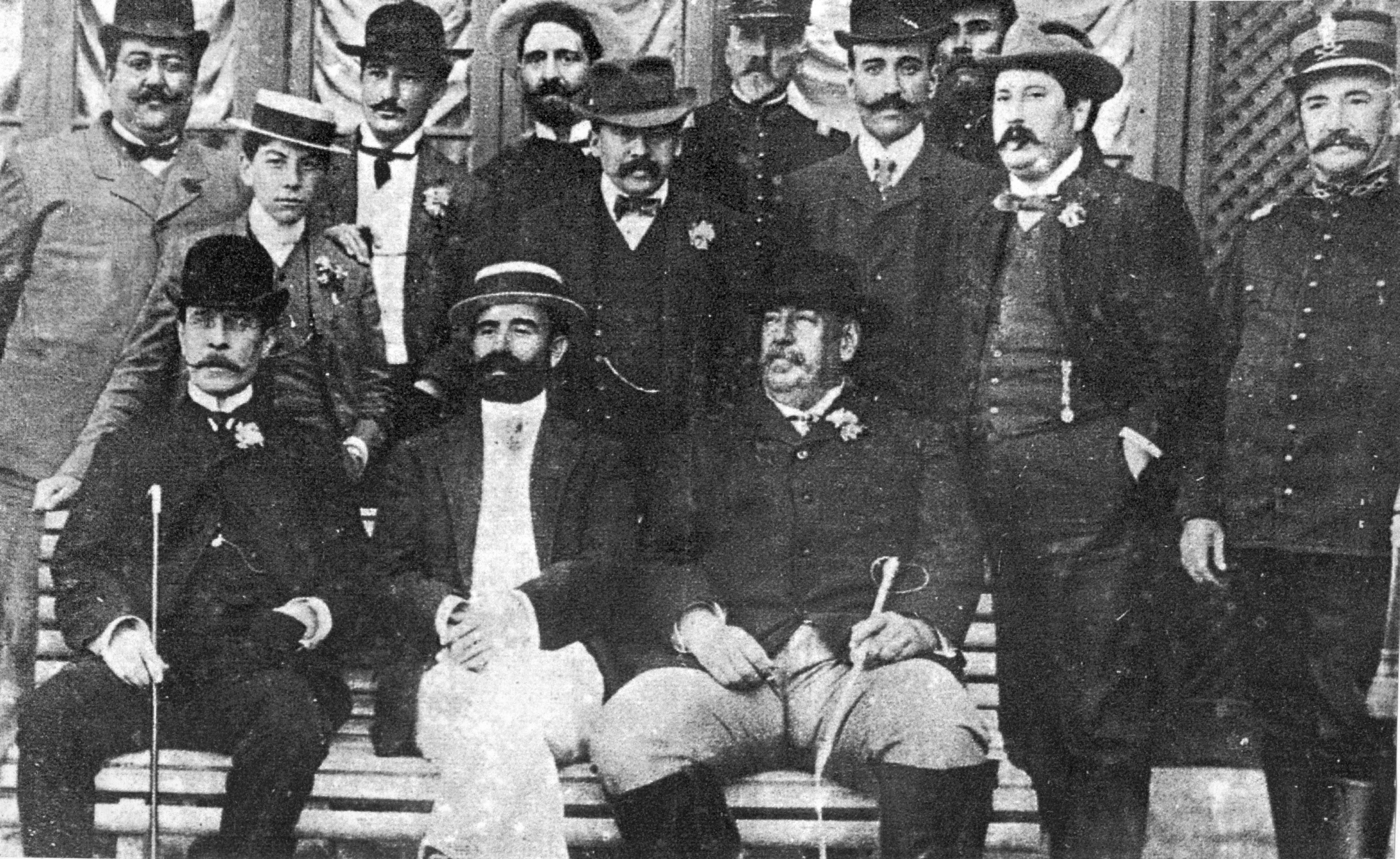
Pedro Manini Ríos along with other Colorado politicians (1911)

Riverism was born in 1913, amid the Colorado faction that wanted to keep the presidential system and rejected Batlle's initiative of a directorial republic. The movement, however, quickly went beyond its original claims and became a full-scale liberal-conservative movement that opposed reformist ideology and wanted a return of the traditional Uruguayan social, governmental and economic order.

The movement was led by Pedro Manini Ríos, a young deputy from the Flores Department and ruralist leader. Most ruralist Colorados adhered to riverism after its foundation, due to their shared rejection of batllist reformism. Therefore, riverism was close to agrarian interests and had a good relationship with the rural population.

Riverism was one of the movements that sprung from traditional batllism after the radicalization of reformist policies along with Sosism and Vierism. Manini Ríos opposed batllism and considered it "an amorphous plan of attack to traditions and aggression to all interests".

=== First political candidacies ===
Riverists took part in the parliamentary elections of 1913 as a separate faction of the Colorado Party and failed to obtain any deputies. Nevertheless, the movement was fairly successful in the 1916 elections and won many seats at the Constituent Assembly, what allowed them to vote against directorialist ideas and put an end to the project.

Riverism formed a coalition with nationalists, civics and ruralists for the 1917 parliamentary elections. The later failure of the project due to an alliance between batllists and nationalist factions caused a conflict between the movement and the National Party that lasted for years, despite both trends had had good relations in the past.

Manini Ríos was appointed minister of the Interior during Baltasar Brum's presidency, and chancellor during José Serrato's.

Riverist Juan Campisteguy became president of Uruguay for the 1927–1931 term. The batllist faction consistently tried to avoid a presidential candidacy by Manini Ríos.

==== The "hándicap" ====
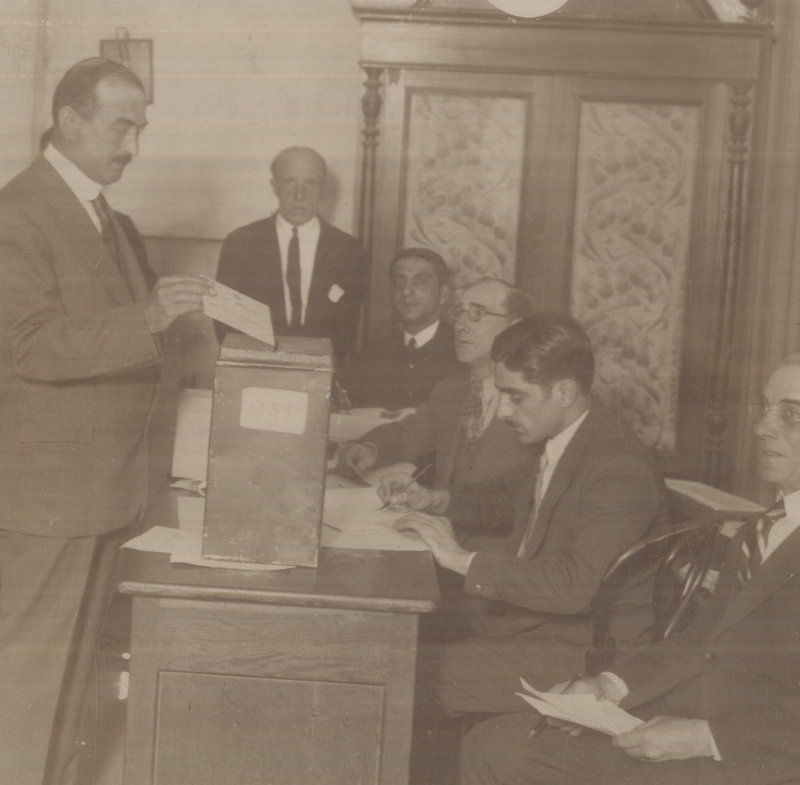
Pedro Manini Ríos voting (1928)

After the death of José Batlle y Ordóñez in 1929, Manini Ríos tried to attempt a presidential candidacy for the Colorado Party. His proposal was rejected by batllists, who saw him as a conservative and reactionary figure, but fearing a possible division of the Colorado Party, they accepted his candidacy and pacted that he would become president if he managed to obtain the 17.5% of the Colorado votes.

This pact was carried out due to the electoral reforms implemented at the Constitution of 1918, that allowed different factions (sometimes of completely different ideologies) to compete under the same party. Despite Manini would not be the most voted candidate, the Colorado Party made a concession by which he would be anyway invested president as a way of preserving partisan unity. The pact was called "the hándicap".

Manini Ríos got 17.3% of the votes, and was therefore unable to reach the presidency.

=== Marzism ===
Manini Ríos was a leading figure of the Rural Federation and supported the creation of the Economic Vigilance Committee, an organization aimed at countering reformist policies that would later sponsor the 1933 Uruguayan coup d'état.

Riverists backed the Marzist dictatorship not only by taking part in the government, but also by actively defending the regime from their official media. Manini Ríos was a member of the government junta and served as minister of finance, diplomat and senator.

In 1934, riverism ran for its last formal election. After the 1942 Uruguayan coup d'état, Manini Ríos resigned as minister of the Interior. His resignation from the senate in 1943 marked the end of his political career and the formal dissolution of the faction.

=== Later development ===
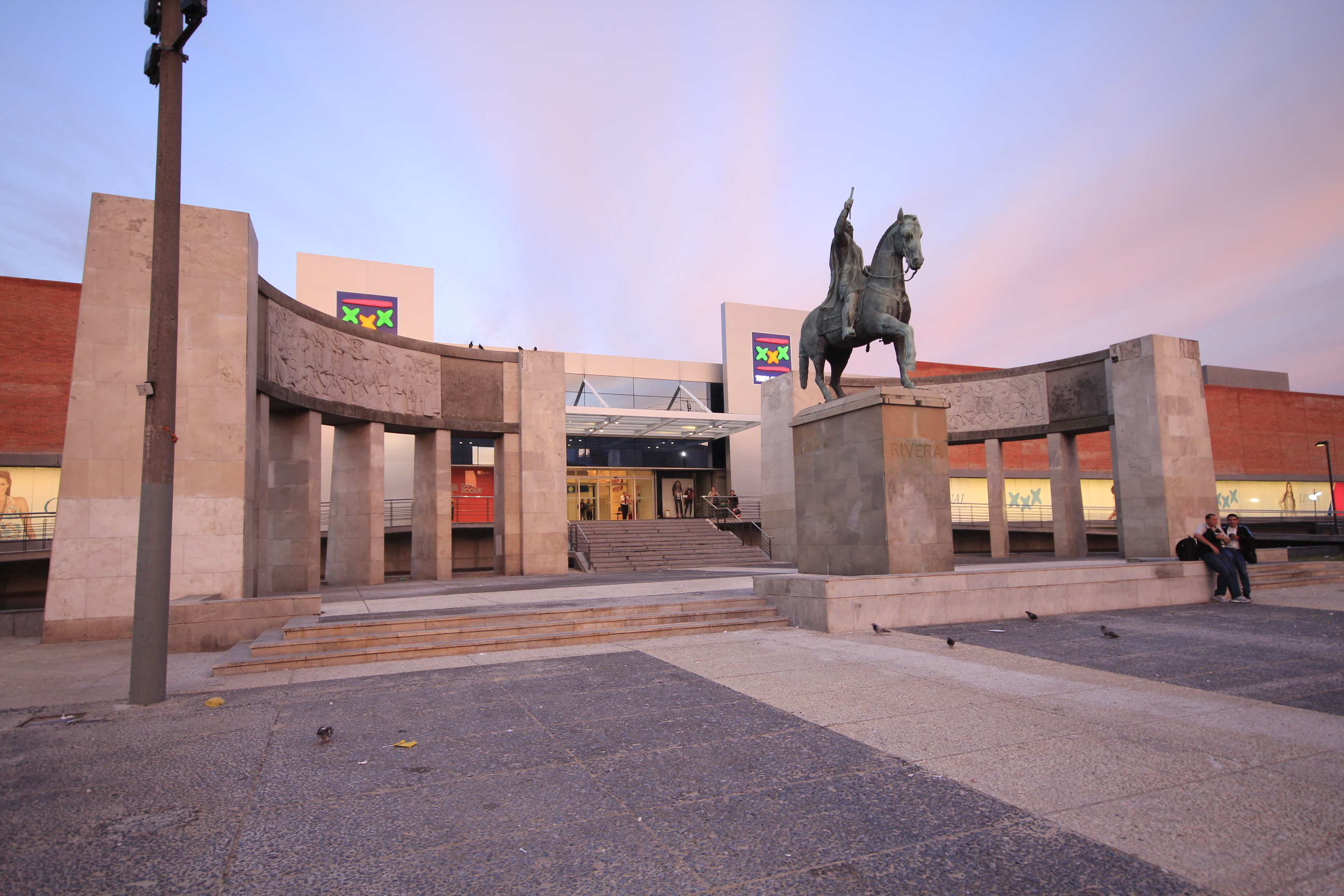
Monument to Fructuoso Rivera at Tres Cruces, built during the Uruguayan Dictatorship.

Carlos, son of Pedro Manini Ríos, held many political positions in later governments such as the Uruguayan Dictatorship or the constitutional presidencies of Jorge Pacheco Areco and Julio María Sanguinetti. His nephew would be a member of the Juventud Uruguaya de Pie, an organization with close ties with the riverist movement.

"La Mañana" was relaunched as a newspaper in 2019, soon before the general elections, after years of inactivity.

Some politicians and analysts have pointed that the riverist trend is still present among Colorado politicians, despite not identifying as such anymore. The main figure of this faction would supposedly be Pedro Bordaberry.

== See also ==
- Fascism in Uruguay
- Herrerism
- National liberalism
- Paleolibertarianism
