= Sosism =

Corporatist political movement in Uruguay

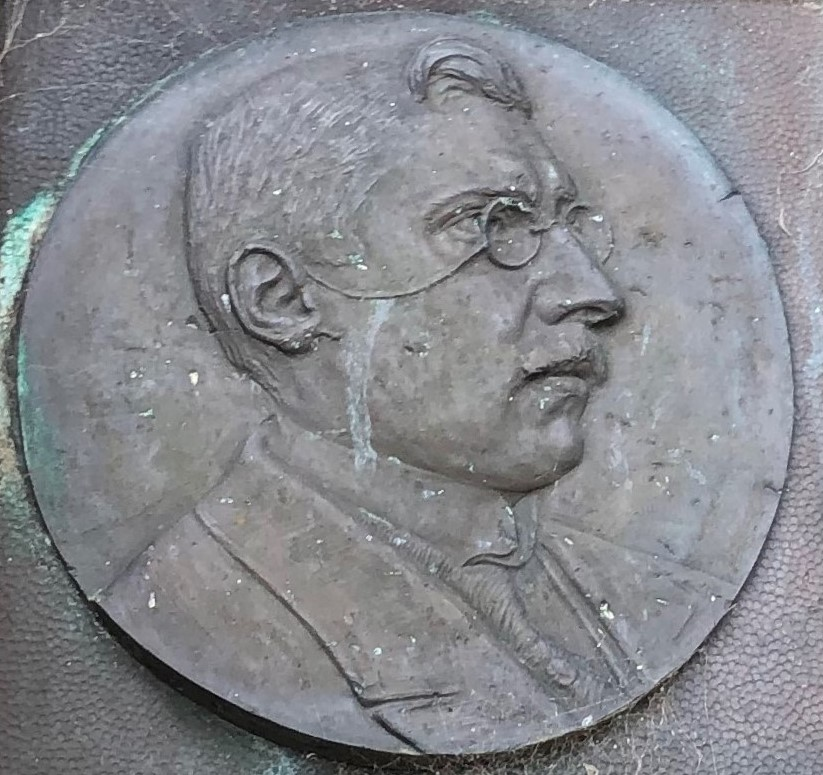
Julio María Sosa, Uruguayan Colorado politician and main figure of sosism, depicted on a medallion.

Sosism (Spanish: Sosismo) was a short-lived corporatist political movement in Uruguay, led by Julio María Sosa.

The movement was one of the three Colorado factions that opposed José Batlle y Ordóñez and tried to realign the party to the right-wing position along with Riverism and Vierism.

Sosists ran for the elections under the name of "Colorado Party for Tradition" (Spanish: Partido Colorado por la Tradición"). They directed the "La Razón" newspaper in Montevideo and "La Cruzada" in Treinta y Tres. The movement was also known as "Traditionalism" (Spanish: Tradicionalismo).

== Ideology ==
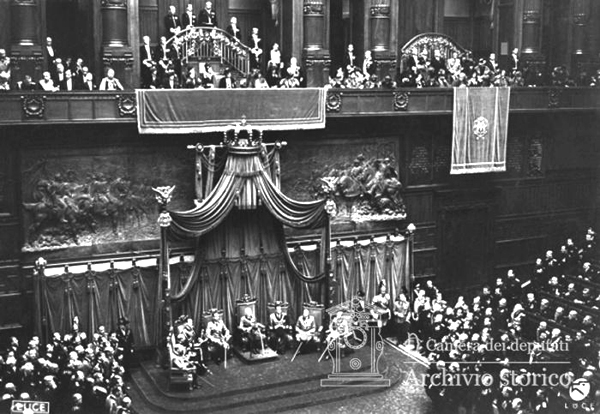
Victor Emmanuel III at the Chamber of Fasces and Corporations.

Sosism was deeply influenced by classical fascism, as Sosa was an outspoken supporter of the Italian corporate state.

Sosists were favourable to labour rights and criticised political opposers as reactionaries or conservatives. Despite their authoritarian positions, sosists saw themselves as defenders of "progress".

Sosa was in favour of a state corporatist regime, as well as of the abolition of the presidency and its replacement by a directorial system.

The sosist newspaper "La Razón" stated in 1928:

The general conviction is beginning to spread that Parliaments are only instruments of purely electoral interests, of bureaucratic designations, conducive to greed and the predominance of mediocrity (…) The system of government must be transformed. It is necessary to consider the country's main interests (...) The livestock industry, the agricultural industry, the manufacturing industries, the intellectual classes must have their own representation in the positions of authority. The Parliament must be an organ of useful energies and not of adventitious conveniences. All modern politics is economic policy. Economic factors dominate the world, in international relations and in relationships within every country.

Sosism vindicated the Defense Government and the historical actions of Colorado caudillos such as Joaquín Suárez or Venancio Flores. Nevertheless, the movement was deeply critical of the Catholic Church and of the upper class. Sosism also had a belligerent rhetoric towards riverists and blancos.

== History ==
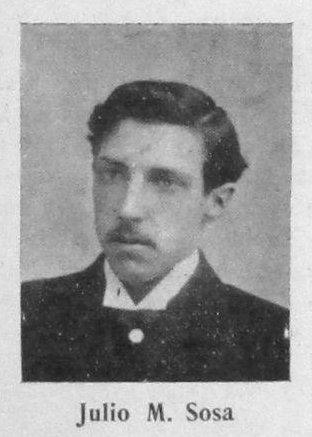
Julio María Sosa as a young man.

Julio María Sosa had originally been a radical batllist. His service at the National Council of Administration, however, got him close to entrepreneurial figures and landowners who influenced his political beliefs. Sosa initially drifted towards classical liberalism during the 1920s decade, similarly to riverist opposers to Batlle y Ordóñez, and founded his own faction (the Colorado Party for Tradition) as a way to distance himself from reformism. After coming into contact with authoritarian ideas, Sosa became a supporter of Italian fascism.

This corporatist shift of originally liberal-conservative politicians has been seen as a consequence of the economic crisis the country was suffering, as well as the rampant political corruption and inefficiency in the country.

Due to his widespread prestige, many batllists supported Sosa's presidential candidacy, but the rejection of the project by Batlle y Ordóñez definitively vetoed the project. This led Sosa to separate completely from batllism and the Colorado Party in order to run for the presidential elections by himself, but failed and was not elected.

The movement split from batllism in 1926 and published a manifesto in 1927. Sosists added a project for a corporatist constitutional reform to their party platform in 1928.

Julio María Sosa died in 1931, and the leadership of the faction was assumed by deputy Alberto Mañé Algorta. Mañé supported Gabriel Terra's candidacy and served as minister during his government. Later sosists would afterwards support the 1933 coup d'état and the subsequent Marzist regime.

== See also ==
- Fascism in Uruguay
- Reactionary modernism
