= Italy–Uruguay relations =

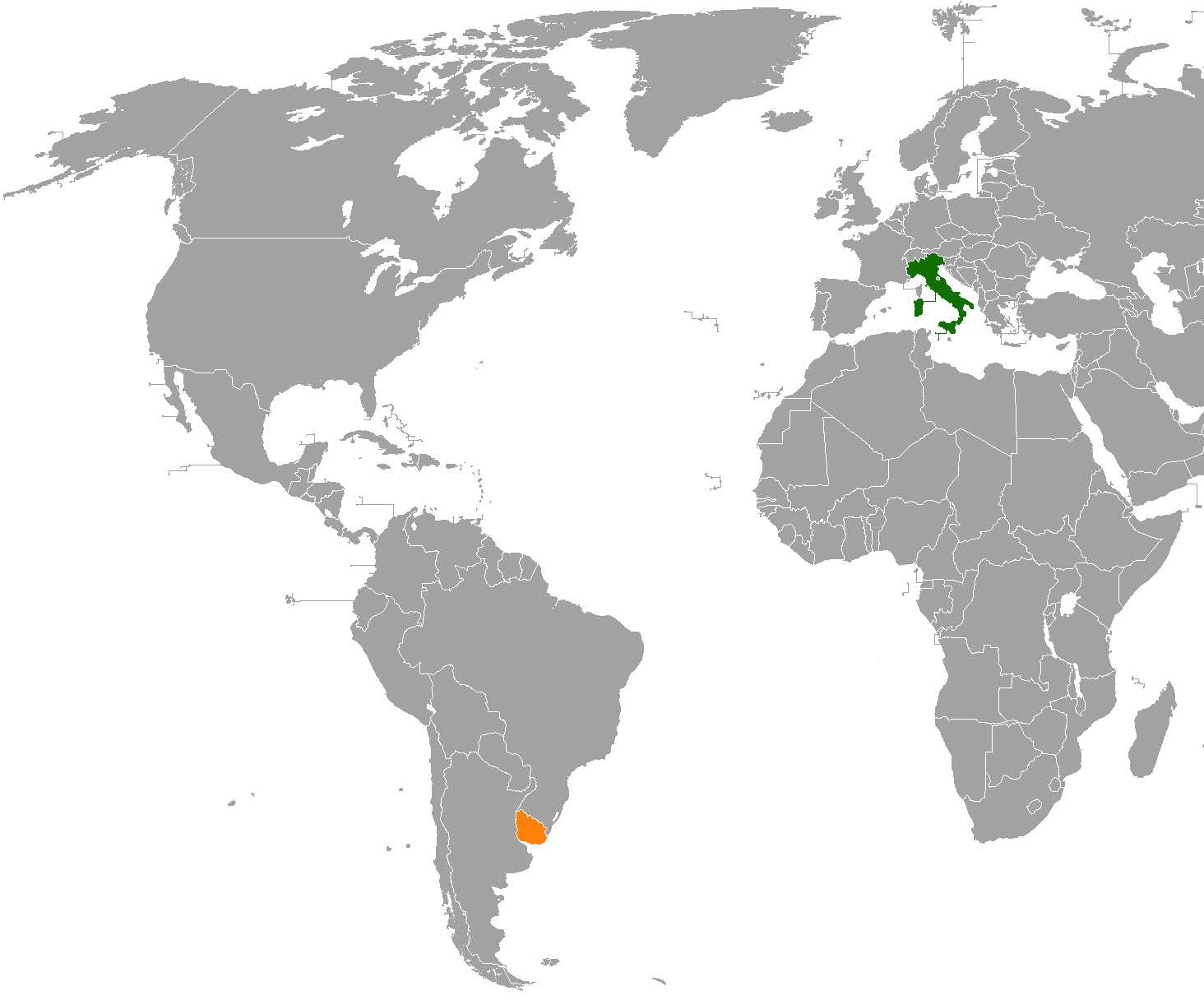
- Italy: Uruguay

Diplomatic mission
- Embassy of Italy, Montevideo: Embassy of Uruguay, Rome

Envoy
- Ambassador Fabrizio Petri (Note: As of 2026): Ambassador Alfredo Guillermo Bogliaccini Llambí (Note: As of 2026)

Italy and Uruguay have maintained historical and current relations and enjoy warm and friendly relations, the importance of which centers on the history of Italian migration to Uruguay. Since 40% of the Uruguayan population is of Italian descent, relations between both nations have remained close, both politically and culturally.

== History ==
In 1834, the Kingdom of Sardinia opened a consular agency in Montevideo and was followed by the Grand Duchy of Tuscany and the Papal States. Italian General Giuseppe Garibaldi—a key figure in the Italian unification (Risorgimento) and the creation of the Kingdom of Italy—played a prominent role in the Uruguayan Civil War, fighting in support of the Gobierno de la Defensa.

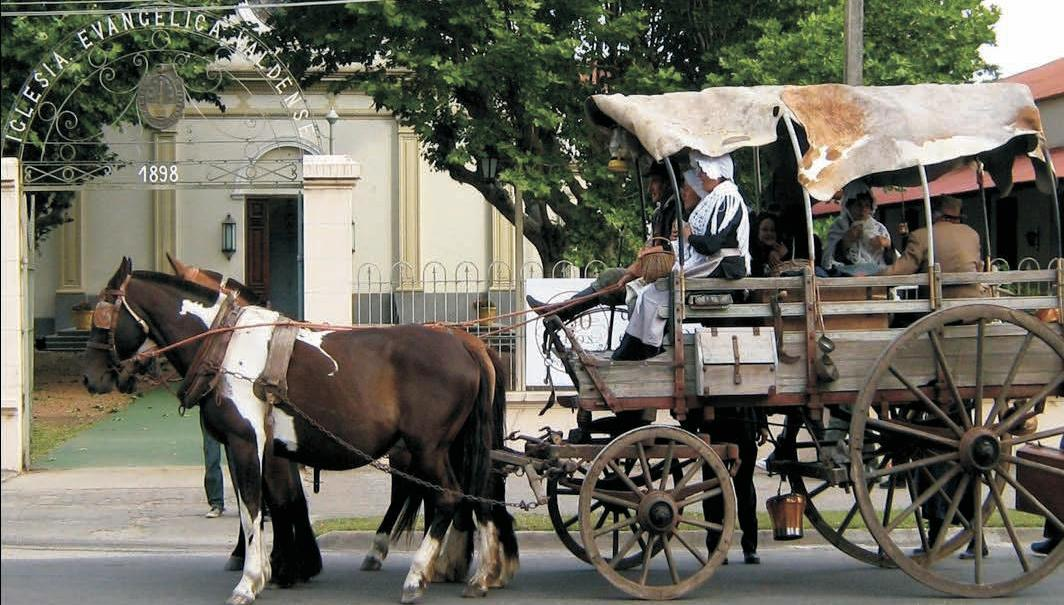
Celebration of the 150th anniversary of the founding of Colonia Valdense, a town established by Piedmontese settlers who were followers of the Waldensian movement.

In the 1850s, a significant wave of Italian immigration began in Uruguay, becoming the backbone of Uruguayan culture. The Italian-Uruguayan community became the largest among immigrant groups, and by 1908, 34.3% of all foreign residents in Uruguay were of Italian origin. In 1920, there were twenty-six Italian associations in Montevideo, including the Italian Hospital Umberto I, the Italian Bank of Uruguay, as well as various educational institutions.

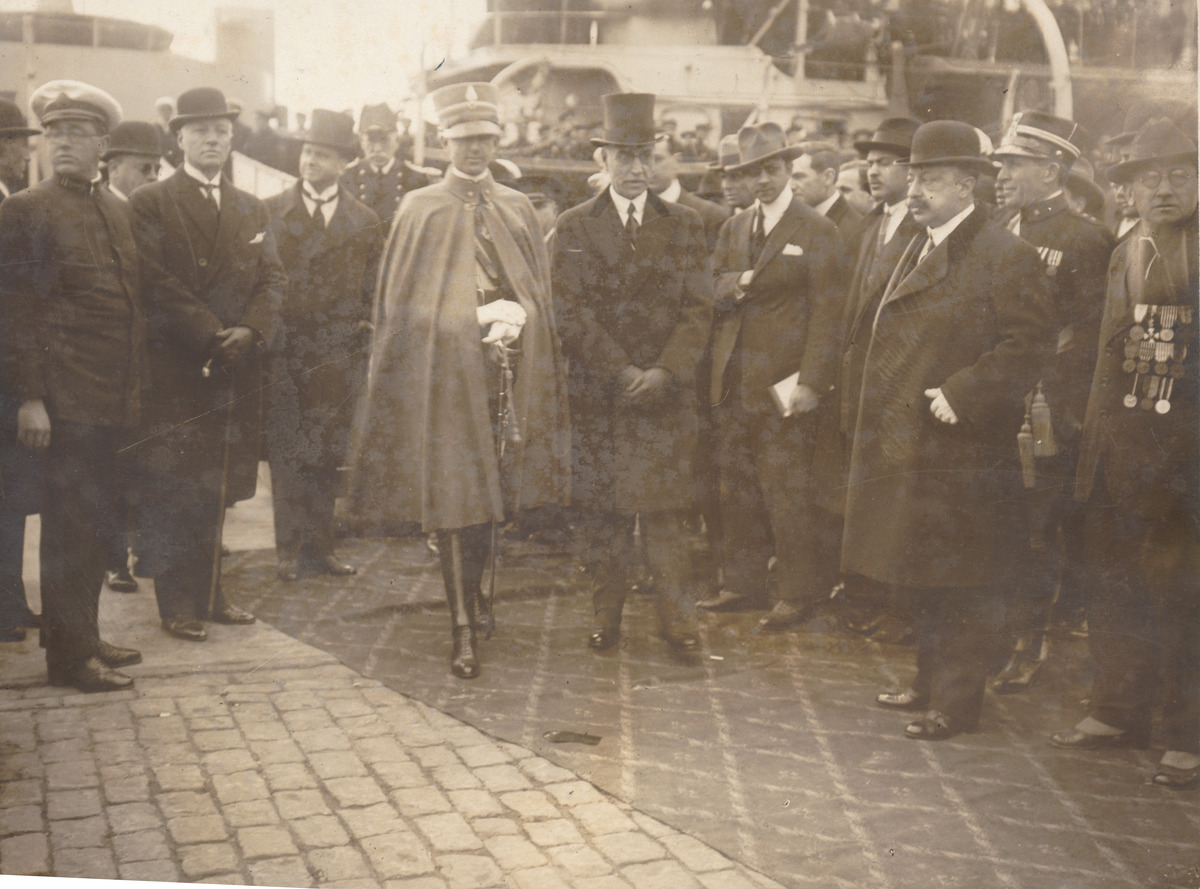
President José Serrato welcoming Crown Prince Umberto of Savoy during his visit to Uruguay, 1924.

In 1924, Umberto of Savoy —then Prince of Piedmont and future King Umberto II— visited Uruguay as part of a political strategy promoted by Fascist Italy under Benito Mussolini, aimed at strengthening ties between Italian emigrants and their homeland. The Italian legation in Montevideo undertook efforts to influence local politics and promote fascism among descendants of Italians in the country, primarily through the establishment of social and cultural associations. The Italian envoy to Uruguay, Serafino Mazzolini, stated that Mussolini regarded Uruguay as the most 'Italian' country in the Americas, owing to its significant population of Italian descent.

During Gabriel Terra’s rule (1931–1938), Uruguay developed closer ties with Fascist Italy, mainly driven by the traditionalist and corporatist elements of Terra’s Revolución Marzista (Spanish for 'March Revolution'). During the Second Italo-Ethiopian War, the Uruguayan government did not condemn Italy’s invasion, and a contingent of Uruguayan volunteers traveled to fight alongside Italian forces.

In January 1942, during World War II, Uruguay declared war on the Axis powers (which included Italy). In April 1946, both nations restored diplomatic relations, and in 1952 they signed an immigration agreement aimed at “increasing and regulating” migration, taking into account Uruguay’s demand for workers and the labor supply available in Italy.

There have been several high-level visits between leaders of both nations. In October 2005, Uruguayan President Tabaré Vázquez paid a visit to Italy. In March 2017, Italian President Sergio Mattarella paid a visit to Uruguay.

In 2019, 125,000 Uruguayans (approximately 3,5% of the country's total population) held Italian passports, many being dual Italian and Uruguayan citizens.

== Bilateral agreements ==
Both nations have signed several agreements such as a Treaty of Friendship, Commerce and Navigation (1843); Extradition Treaty (1881); Agreement on the Transportation of Cattle between both nations (1976); Agreement on Social Security (1985); Agreement on Technical Cooperation (1988); Agreement on the Promotion and Protection of Investments (1990); Agreement on Cinematographic Co-Production (2004); Agreement on Defense Cooperation (2017); Agreement in Judicial Matters (2019); Agreement to Eliminate Double Taxation in Relation to Income Taxes and Prevent Tax Evasion and Avoidance (2019) and an Agreement on Cultural and Scientific cooperation (2019).

== Resident diplomatic missions ==
- Italy has an embassy in Montevideo.
- Uruguay has an embassy in Rome and a consulate-general in Milan.

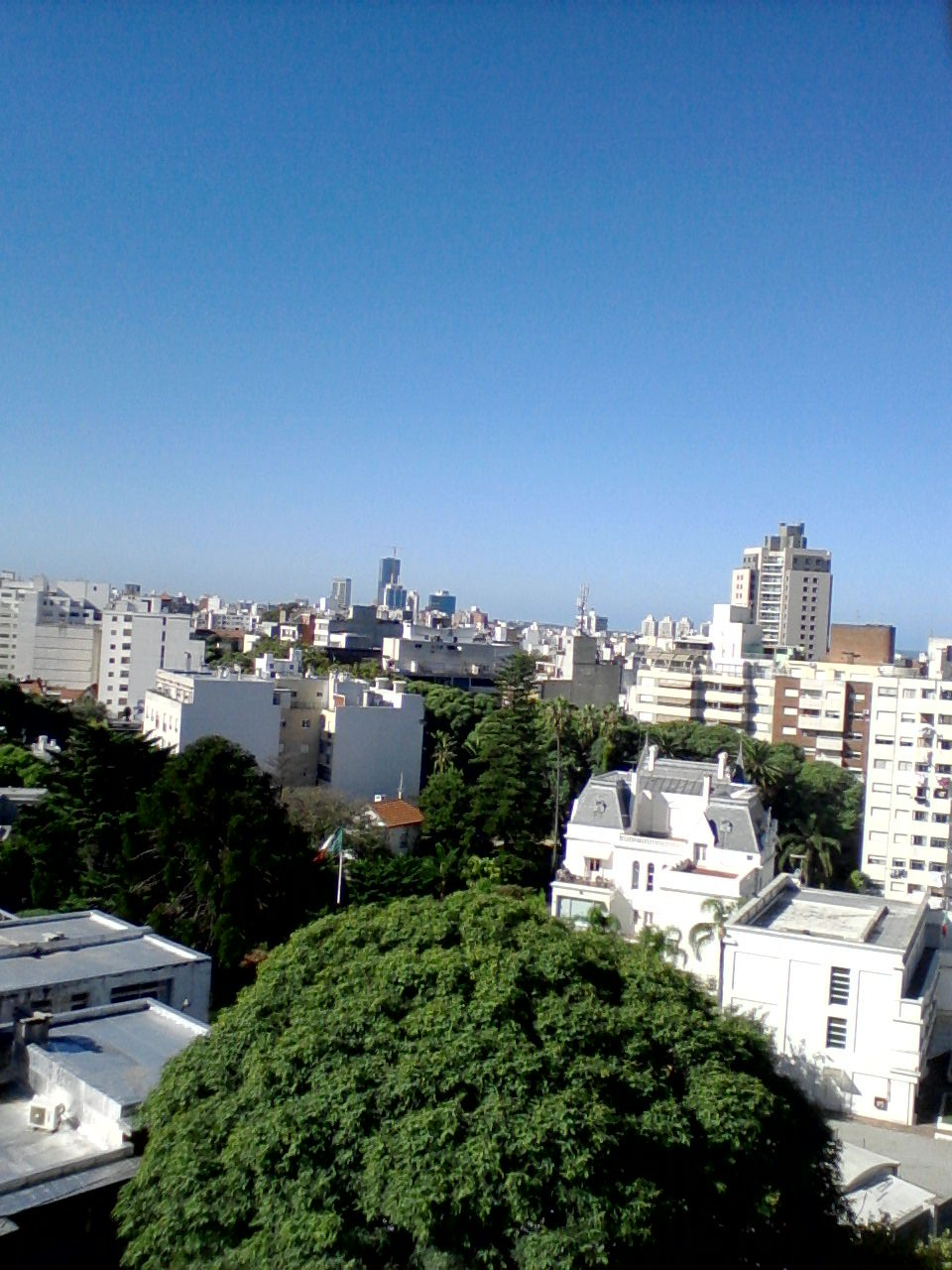
Embassy of Italy in Montevideo

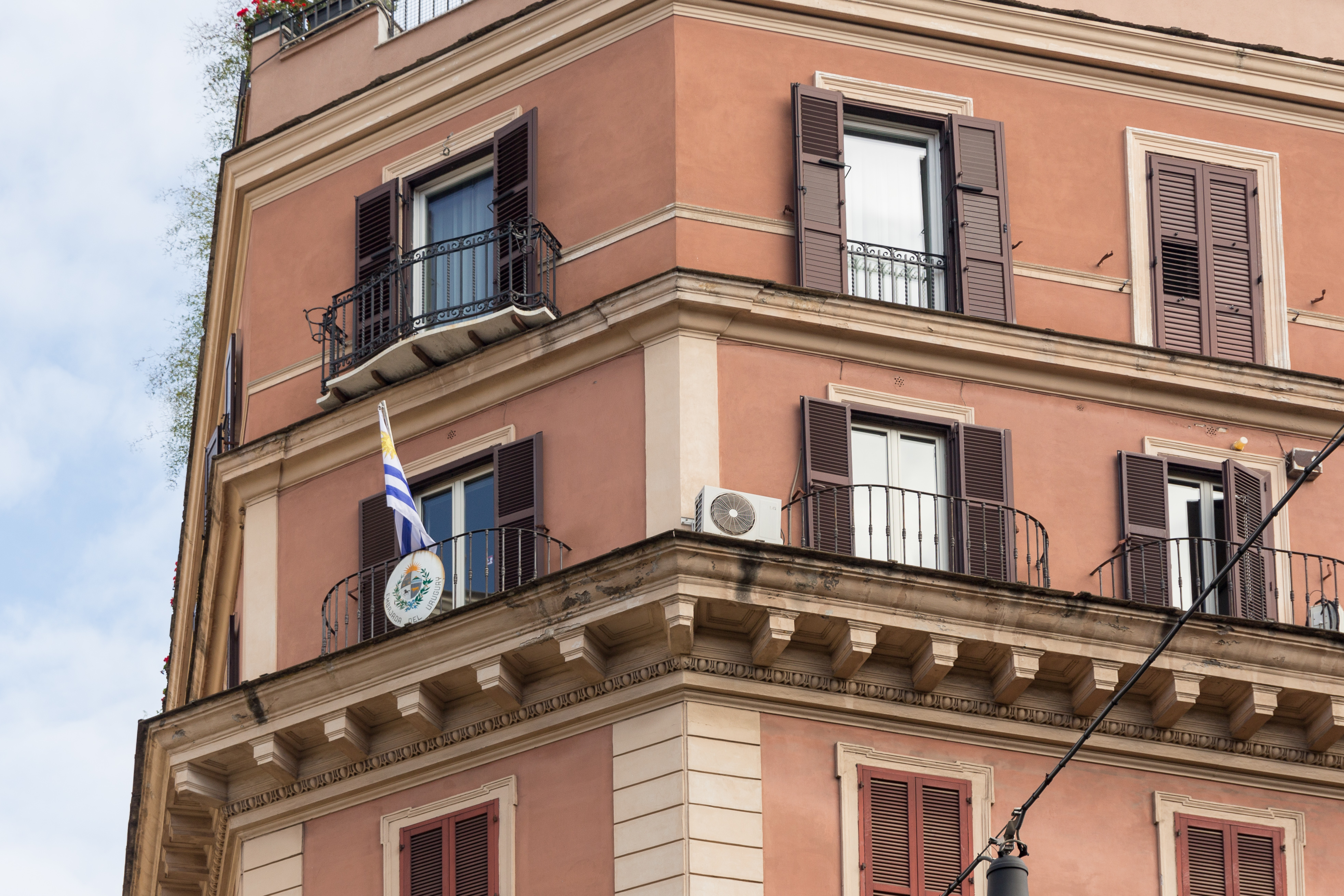
Embassy of Uruguay in Rome

== See also ==
- Foreign relations of Italy
- Foreign relations of Uruguay
- Italian Uruguayans
- Uruguayans in Italy
