= Uruguayans in Italy =

Total population
- 1304 (ISTAT: 2014)

Regions with significant populations
- Lombardy; Lazio; Piedmont

Languages
- Italian; Spanish

Religion
- Catholic Church

Uruguayans in Italy are people born in Uruguay who emigrated to Italy or Italian citizens of Uruguayan descent.

== Overview ==
No less than one-third of Uruguayans are of Italian descent; and thousands of Italian-Uruguayans hold Italian passports. These reasons help explain why so many Uruguayans immigrated to Italy in search of opportunities. An important group of Uruguayan footballers are playing or played in Italian teams. There are also some Italian-born people of Uruguayan descent.

Expatriate Uruguayans have their own associations in Italy, notably the Italy-Uruguay Cultural Association and two Consultative Councils.

== Notable people ==
- Michele Andreolo, footballer
- Nicolás Suárez Bremec, footballer

== See also ==
- Emigration from Uruguay
- Italy–Uruguay relations
- Italian Uruguayan
