= Adolfo Agorio =

Uruguayan essayist, theatre critic, professor, and journalist

Adolfo Agorio Etcheverry (15 September 1888 – 19 April 1965) was an Uruguayan essayist, theatre critic, professor, and journalist.

Agorio was main intellectual figures of Uruguayan fascism. He had founded the Acción Revisionista del Uruguay, originally an explicitly fascist organization that later joined the Colorado Party (Uruguay). The Acción edited a magazine called Corporaciones (lit. "corporations") about corporatist economics. The Acción had close ties with the Brazilian Integralist Action, holding it as its main model of inspiration and also integrated Nazi elements.

== Biography ==
He started his career in journalism with El Estudiante, the magazine of his University, where his articles earned the praise of José Enrique Rodó. They collaborated in Samuel Blixen's La Razon and in El Liberal under Belén de Sárraga.

His first articles were published in La Tribuna Popular.

In 1910, he founded a short-lived journal for the literature and politics of Uruguay called "El Oriental" in Buenos Aires.

In 1914 Batlle y Ordóñez invited Etcheverry to collaborate on the Uruguayan newspaper El Día, where he wrote under the pseudonym Jacob.

He was a contributer to the French newspaper L'Eclair in Paris, the Argentinian newspaper La Nación in Buenos Aires, and the Uruguayan newspaper La Mañana in Montevideo.

== Works ==
- La Fragua (apuntes de la guerra europea) (1915).
- Fuerza y Derecho. Aspectos morales de la gran guerra (1916).
- L´Amérique Latine et la France (1917).
- La sombra de Europa (1917).
- La rishi abura (1919).
- Ataraxia (1923).
- Bajo la mirada de Lenin (1925).
- Roma y el espíritu de occidente (1934).
- Introducción al humanismo (1941).
- Civilizadores. El drama de los gauchos éuskaros en el Río de la Plata (1947).
- Leoncio Lasso de la Vega y la sombra del diablo (1957).
