= Julio María Sosa =

Uruguayan lawyer (1879–1931)

Julio María Sosa Debrus
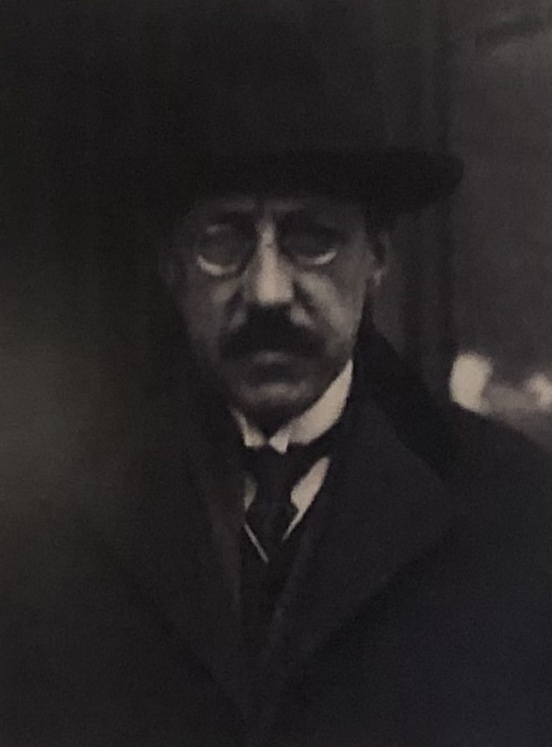

President of the National Council of Administration
- In office 1923–1925
- Preceded by: José Batlle y Ordóñez
- Succeeded by: Luis Alberto de Herrera

President of Club Atlético Peñarol
- In office 1921–1928
- Preceded by: Félix Polleri
- Succeeded by: Arturo Abella

Personal details
- Born: 8 September 1879 Montevideo, Uruguay
- Died: 27 January 1931 (aged 51)
- Party: Colorado Party
- Parent(s): Juan B. Sosa; Isabel Debrus
- Profession: Journalist, politician

Julio María Sosa Debrus (Montevideo, September 8, 1879 - January 27, 1931) was a Uruguayan journalist and politician. He was a member of the Colorado Party.

He founded and led the corporatist political movement of Sosism.

== Biography ==
He was born to Juan B. Sosa and Isabel Debrus on September 8th, 1879. Although he took tertiary-level courses, he never completed a university degree.

Known for his role as a football manager, he served as president of Club Atlético Peñarol during the 1921-1928 period.

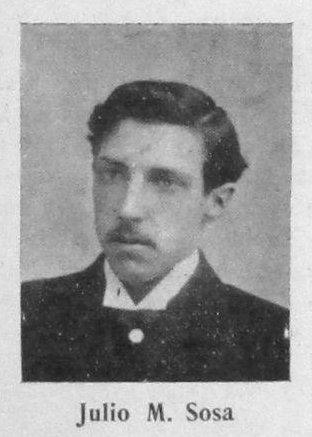
A young Sosa.

He died in 1931, receiving the honors of a Minister. He was buried in The British Cemetery Montevideo.

== Political activity ==
A member of the Colorado Party, he held various positions in the municipal administration of Montevideo.

Among his contributions was his decisive involvement in the construction of the former Allies Park, now José Batlle y Ordóñez Park.

He was a deputy between 1905 and 1914 and 1920 to 1923. He was later a senator between 1915 and 1920, and also a member of the Constituent Assembly from 1916 to 1917.

He then served as president of the National Council of Administration between 1923 and 1925 and was a candidate for the Presidency of the Republic.

== Journalism ==
He was director of the newspaper El Día and of Diario Nuevo. He wrote historical monographs such as Confraternidad americana (1900), Lavalleja y Oribe (1902), and Maestros y escuelas (1916).

== See also ==
- Sosism
- Batllism

| Preceded by José Batlle y Ordóñez | President of the National Council of Administration; 1923-1925 | Succeeded by Luis Alberto de Herrera |
| Preceded by Félix Polleri | President of Club Atlético Peñarol; 1921-1928 | Succeeded by Arturo Abella |
