= Belén de Sárraga =

Spanish-born Mexican journalist and feminist (1874–1951)

Belén de Sárraga Hernández (1874–1951) was a Spanish feminist of the Federal Republican Party. She was the daughter of a Liberal military from Puerto Rico. She carried out propaganda tours and she stayed in Ibero-America for long periods of time. In the twenties, she was an anticlerical activist together with Atala Apodaca, during the Mexican Revolution. She held conferences all over the country aided by revolutionary governments. She actively took part in the second Spanish Republic politics. She was exiled in México.

In 1904, she was arrested and convicted in Málaga, for two months and one day of major arrest, because of giving a speech against the Polavieja General at the entrance of the Hotel where she was staying. She criticised the General for the execution of the poet and the hero of the Philippine Independence, José Rizal.

== Biography ==
Belén de Sárraga Hernández was born in Valladolid in 1874, during the Sexenio Democrático. She was Vicente de Sárraga's first-born who was a republican and mason. She was coming from a bourgeois family and she was born two years after the civil marriage of her parents' in 1874. Her mother was Felisa Hernández Urgón, from Valladolid and from humble origins. In 1877, Vicente de Sárraga and Felisa celebrated a new marriage: canonical.

Belén and her parents moved to Puerto Rico in 1880 and advised by her grandfather Fernando Ascensión de Sárraga y Aguayo (previous Education Director from San Juan de Puerto Rico School) she studied a teaching degree. She received a cultivated education.

According to reliable sources, Belén's father was an arrogant gambler, as well as a conspirator. His personality brought him numerous exiles, accusations and trials. Due to this, Vicente de Sarraga and Felisa split up in 1888, after returning to Spain. One year later, in 1889, Belén's mother died, causing a wave of criticism and leaving Belén and his brother Rafael in the care of their maternal grandmother, Ana Urgón. This woman was described as being illiterate but strong enough to look after her grandchildren. In 1891, Belén's father abandoned them in order to begin a new sentimental relationship and get married again.

Belén fought for financial support to her and his brother's maintenance, thereby she introduced herself slowly in the Republican federal circles, where she met her peer Emilio Ferrero Balaguer, a Republican and mason trader. In 1890, she moved with Emilio and her brother Rafael to Barcelona, and in 1890 (1894 according to other sources), Emilio and Belén got married. Belén, following the traditions of the time, added her husband's family name to hers. They had three children: Libertad, Demófilo Dantón and Víctor Volney. Her children's names indicate her left-leaning idealism. Belén admitted that she had found a 'life companion' and doctrine companion, her soul mate and, also, a mentor with whom she could preach her ideas in conferences, meetings, speeches and other functions. Not long after, Belén began to gain recognition in the spheres of oratory and press, after writing numerous articles in Barcelona and Madrid magazines.

The fame and acts of Belén Sárraga de Ferrero —as she was known then—, made her rise quickly: She studied and graduated as a doctor at the University of Barcelona. In the university, Belén organized a protest against the removal of Odón de Buen from the professorship. She was also a contributor with the spiritual magazine La Luz del Porvenir de Barcelona. Belén was an enthusiastic reader of works of Pierre-Joseph Proudhon, Mikhail Bakunin and Piotr Kropotkin, and proclaimed herself a spiritual daughter of Pi y Margall, Eduardo Benot and Nicolás Estévanez, Olimpia Gouges, Madame de Stäel, George Sand y Louise Miche

The fame of Belén remained for fifteen years, but her marriage was in crisis, since the role of Emilio gradually became just "the husband of Belén Sárraga", which broke down the fraternal, secular and Republican ideal that was beginning to be maintained. It is believed that this generated troubles in the relationship and eventually they split up. In 1911, Belén changed her family name and chose "de Sárraga" again. Emilio, Demófilo Dantón and Víctor Volney moved to Dayton, Ohio; however, Emilio continued to travel extensively in South America. Demófilo Dantón later acted in films such as Verbena tragica which is housed in the Library of Congress National Film Registry.

=== Journalism and political and civic activity ===
In 1895, she founded the Federación de Grupos Femeninos in Valencia. One year later, in Barcelona, she founded the Asociación de Mujeres Librepensadoras, which was forbidden by the governor and that is why she was arrested. Another time in Valencia, she took part in some protests against the monarchy and in favour of Cuban Independence. She was arrested during an independence protest in August. At the end of that year, she became part of the masonic lodge 'Severidad'. Moreover, she also directed the newspaper La Conciencia Libre.

=== Death ===
She died of nephritis, old and with financial problems, on 10 September 1950 in Mexico. Her Spanish and Mexican friends kept watch over her body according to masonics rituals and she was later incinerated.

== Works ==
Belén de Sárraga wrote in prose and verse. Some of her libertarian publications are Adelante, El Amigo del Pueblo, El Despertar de los Trabajadores, El Obrero, El Porvenir del Obrero, La Protesta. Nevertheless, she has other works (books and brouchures) such as:

- Minucias (Poems) (Málaga, 1902)
- Congreso Universal de Librepensadores de Ginebra (Málaga, 1903)
- Conferencias sociológicas y de crítica religiosa, dadas en Santiago de Chile en enero y febrero de 1913 (Santiago, 1913)
- A través de un continente. El anticlericalismo en América (Lisbon, 1914)
- La evolución de los pueblos y las congregaciones religiosas. Conferencias (Mexico City, 1915)
- La iglesia en la política (Mexico City, 1923)
- Conference on Sunday, 4 May 1924 in Teatro Maxim in order to pay tribute to Felipe Carrillo Puerto. It was organised by Agrupación Socialista de La Habana (Mexico City, 1924)
- La cuestión religiosa, Federación anticlerical Mexicana (Mexico City, 1926)
- La papisa Juana. Testimonio histórico contra el origen divino del Papado (Asunción, 1931)
- El vicariato divino: síntesis de la vida pontificia en sus tres más importantes aspectos: político, moral y económico. (Asunción, 1931)

== Bibliography ==
- (2008) Ana Muiña, Rebeldes periféricas del siglo XIX, La Linterna Sorda Ediciones, 216 Páginas con 250 fotografías e ilustraciones de la época, ISBN 978-84-936562-0-1.
