= Monarchism in Uruguay =

Political movement in Uruguay

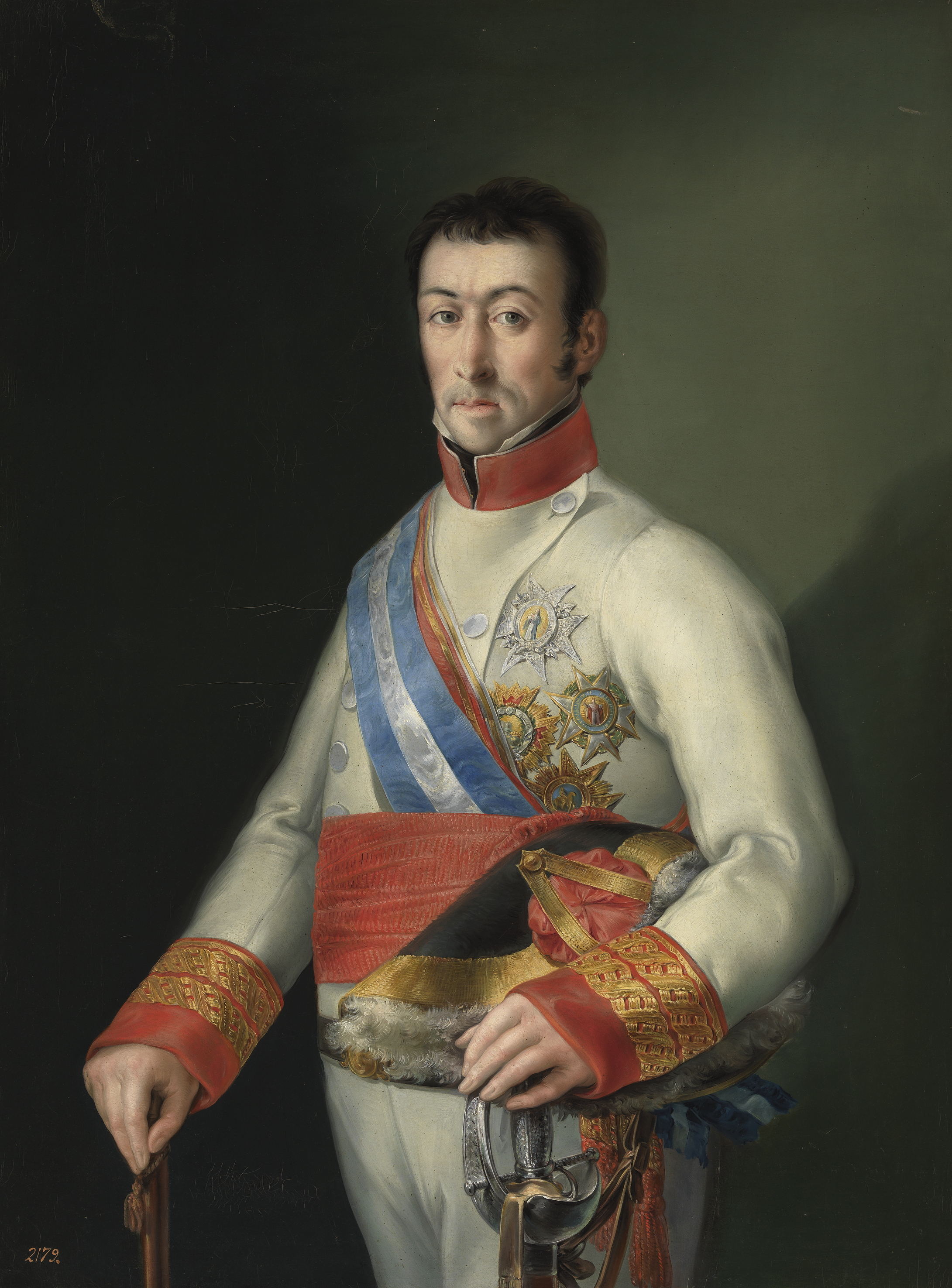
General Francisco Javier de Elío, self-proclaimed last viceroy of the Río de la Plata.

Monarchism in Uruguay is a loosely organized historical political movement advocating for the restoration, preservation or creation of a monarchical regime in Uruguay.

Uruguayan monarchism was born after the May Revolution, and has been historically defended by different ideologies and political trends such as reactionary royalism or liberal conservatism. Most of them focused on the preservation of order and the rejection of revolution or social unrest. Seeing the monarchy as a powerful institution to oppose "anarchy" and social upheaval, the movement was prevalent among both aristocratic and popular classes of early Uruguayan society.

== Loyalism ==
=== Spanish loyalism ===
Flag of the Spanish Empire from 1785 to 1931.

According to the Maddison Project, Uruguay was the wealthiest region of the Spanish Empire by 1800. This positive economic situation caused the Montevidean elite to be particularly supportive of the Spanish monarchy. The city promptly declared its loyalty to the crown and refused to join the May Revolution, which ended up in the declaration of Independence of Argentina.

Montevideo's governor Francisco Javier de Elío declared himself the last viceroy of the Río de la Plata, making the Uruguayan territory a realista stronghold until its capitulation to General Artigas' revolutionary militias after the Second Siege of Montevideo. Even after the fall of the city most Montevideans expected a Spanish restoration to happen sooner or later, and many worked actively for it. Elío, a staunch supporter of absolutism, would afterwards fly to Spain and be executed by liberals during the Trienio Liberal. The royal navy used Montevideo as a military base from where commanders Juan Ángel Michelena and Jacinto de Romarate led numerous attacks and raids on the Buenos Aires junta territory.

Royalist resistance in Montevideo was mainly led by sergeant major Diego Ponce de León. Through active propaganda he managed to secure royalist adherence in the city, and was made a member of the ruling junta that supported Elío's rule. Popular militias known as "empecinados" (lit. 'stubborn'), name taken from the guerrilla regiments who fought under Juan Martín Díez against the Napoleonic Empire in the Spanish War of Independence, were born for the defense of strict loyalism to Ferdinand VII and acquired widespread reputation. Deeply influential among the poor classes, empecinados used violent tactics to intimidate those sympathetic to the revolutionaries. The faction became rapidly a mass movement and had a great relevance among the defenders of the city, but it was quickly dissolved after the siege and the emigration of most royalists.

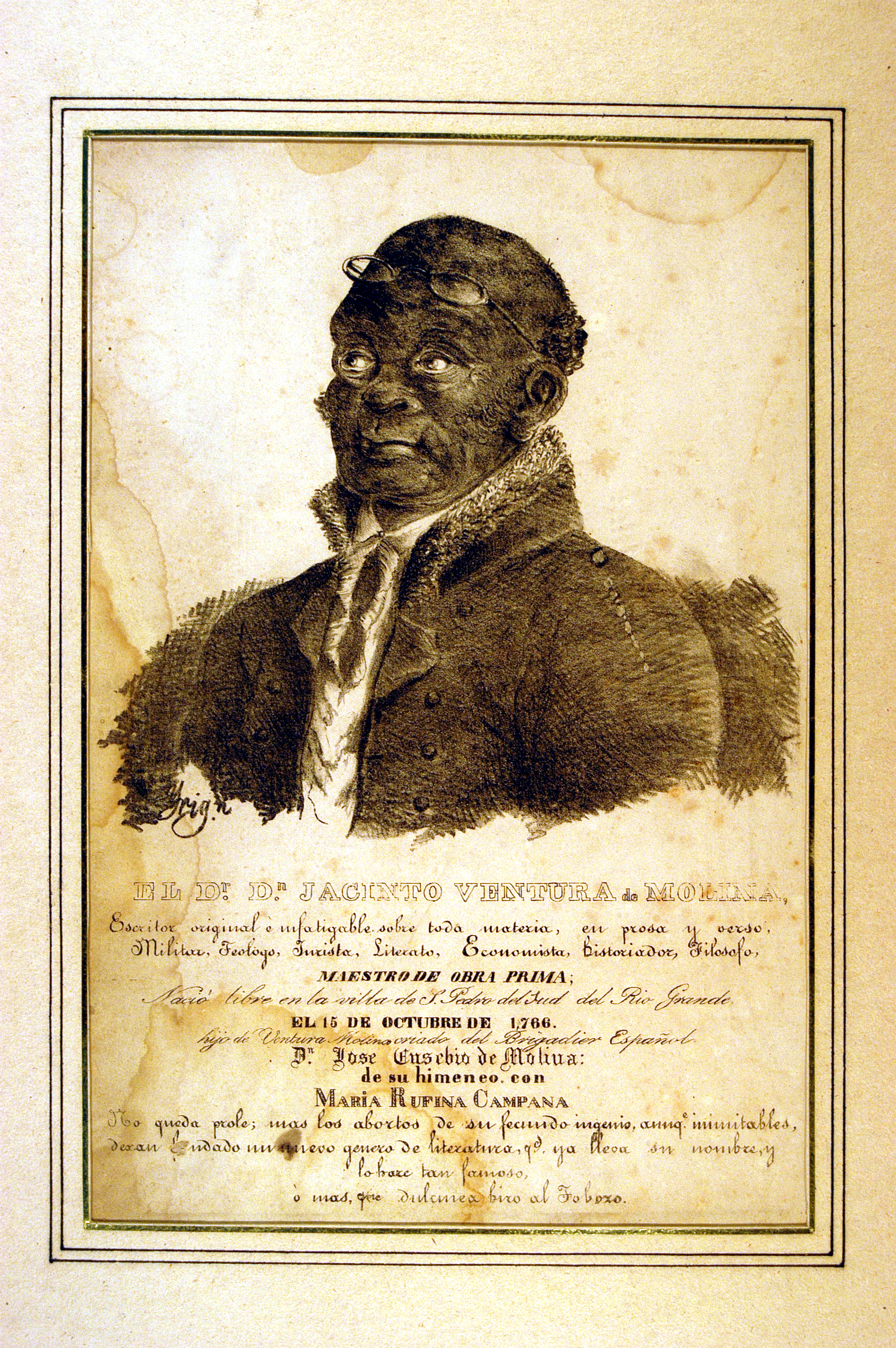
Jacinto Ventura de Molina, Uruguayan monarchist intellectual.

One of the most important Uruguayan monarchist thinkers was Afro-Uruguayan freedman Jacinto Ventura de Molina. A fervent Catholic and devotee of Saint Benedict the Moor, de Molina rejected democracy and was a defender of the divine right of kings. He defended absolute monarchy from a Counter-Enlightened perspective, advocating for the religious virtues of obedience and loyalty. De Molina considered Christianity as a pillar for social equality, as the possibility of redemption open to both black and white people should promote an equal respect between all races. De Molina promoted Catholic devotion to Saint Balthazar as a unifying figure for the black community that could be shared with white citizens.

De Molina criticized slavery from a Christian point of view, but didn't take part in the Uruguayan abolitionist movement due to its links with liberalism.

Despite originally expecting a Spanish restoration after the end of the Portuguese conquest of the Banda Oriental, de Molina accepted the occupation and carried out extensive intellectual work during the luso-Brazilian rule, becoming an important collaborator of the Viscount of Laguna. After the independence he worked as a lawyer, continued his political activism among the black population of Montevideo and tried to sponsor a school for black children.

Most Spanish loyalists did not collaborate with the occupation, and many were persecuted or banished from the province. A minority, however, expected the Portuguese to return the province to Spain after a process of "pacification" and supported the invasion eagerly.

=== Portuguese and Brazilian loyalism ===
Flag of the Oriental Cisplatine State.

After the Portuguese conquest of the Banda Oriental, most of the Uruguayan wealthy elites sided with the Portuguese Empire as an alleged restorer of a lost social order destroyed by the Independence War. After General Carlos Frederico Lecor's entry into Montevideo, the newly formed Cisplatine Congress by renowned Uruguayan citizens voted in favour of an annexation of the province to the Empire under the name of Cisplatina.

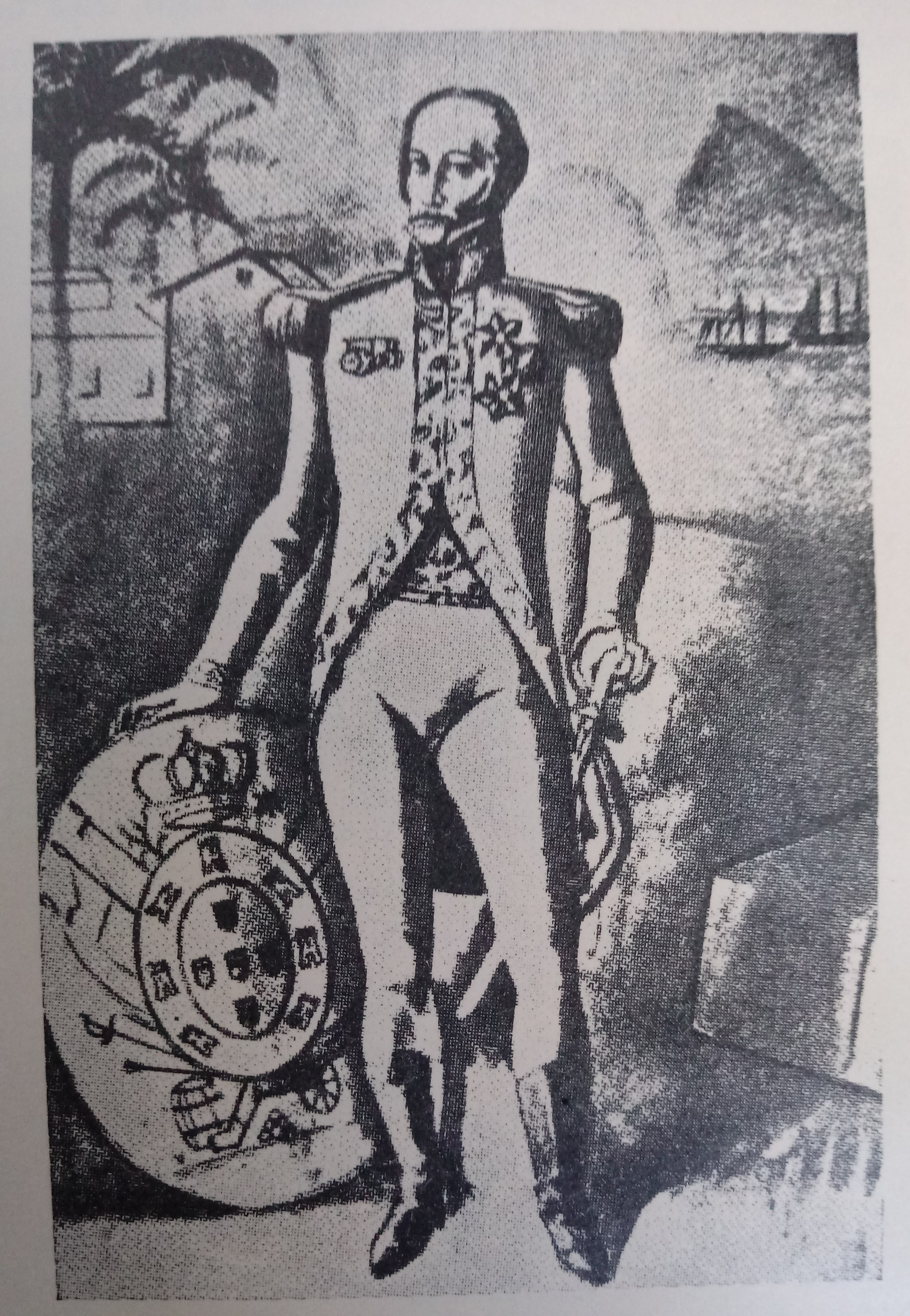
Carlos Frederico Lecor, Baron of Laguna, Portuguese General and governor of the Cisplatine Province.

Those supportive of the union were mainly organized in a political circle called the "Baron's Club", through which most intellectuals and aristocrats collaborated with the newly established regime.

The Cisplatine Congress was given the possibility to form an independent state or to join the empire, but chose the latter option. Nevertheless, the Congress set a number of conditions for the annexation of the province, which included the preservation of Spanish language, free trade with the rest of the Empire, political autonomy to designate civil and military authorities, exemption of new taxes, parliamentary representation at Rio de Janeiro and the preservation of all traditional "privileges, exemptions, fueros, practices, titles and rights" the province had had.

Lecor entered Montevideo without resistance and was welcomed by the local Cabildo thanks to his previous negotiations with local authorities. The baron promoted political marriages between Portuguese military commanders and Montevidean aristocratic women in order to improve relations with Uruguayan high society. Soon before the cry of Ipiranga and the independence of Brazil the Portuguese monarchy had considered the possibility of returning Cisplatina to Spain, but the refusal of Lecor sided him with Pedro I and the province became a part of the Brazilian Empire.

Despite their initial support, however, the ruling classes were soon disappointed by Lecor's policies, and most aristocrats sympathized with the Thirty-Three Orientals rebellion in 1825.

== Constitutional monarchism ==
Flag of Argentina used by members of the Unitarian Party exiled in Montevideo.

In 1831, one year after the first constitutional oath, Uruguayan liberal-conservative diplomat Nicolás Gregorio Herrera offered the Spanish monarchy to enthrone Infante Sebastián as "King of the Oriental State". His proposal was rejected by the King of Spain. A similar initiative had been suggested by John VI as a neutral solution to the Banda Oriental conflict.

Argentine unitarianism had historically been favourable to the creation of a liberal constitutional monarchy in the United Provinces of the Río de la Plata. This project, commonly known as Carlotism, was an influential political movement in the early days of Argentine Independence. Carlotist presence is documented among the Uruguayan elites since 1808, but was quickly overcome by Spanish loyalism. The project was revitalized in Uruguay after 1818 but was never implemented.

After the declaration of Independence of Uruguay and the outbreak of the Uruguayan Civil War, many Unitarian exiles sought refuge in the Defense Government of Montevideo against the political persecution started by dictator Juan Manuel de Rosas. Montevideo became a Unitarian bulwark under the rule of the Colorado Party, which was also close to the Brazilian Empire. Many members of the Baron's Club, such as José Longinos Ellauri or Nicolás Gregorio Herrera joined the Defense Government, which was closer to their constitutional and liberal ideas. Fructuoso Rivera, the president of such faction, had been a member of the Club and advocated for a "relative independence" from Brazil in contrast to an "absolute independence" that would make the country "fall into anarchy".

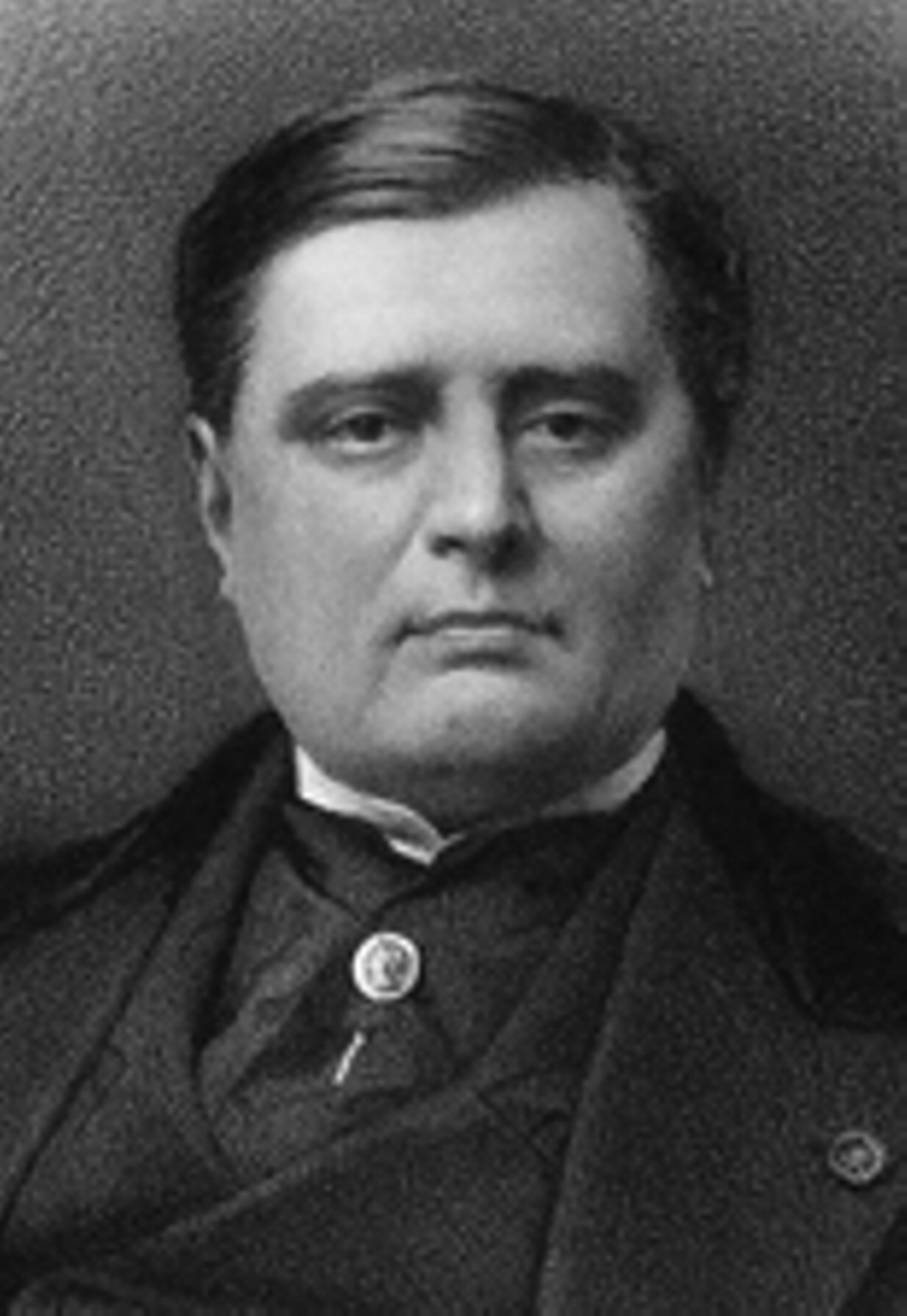
Alexandre Colonna-Walewski, French diplomat and natural son of emperor Napoleon. During his trip to Uruguay in 1847, he expressed positive views on an annexation of Uruguay by the July Monarchy.

In the context of the Uruguayan Civil War, some politicians of the Defense such as Francisco Muñoz, Florencio Varela or Francisco Vidal tried to diplomatically annex Uruguay to the British monarchy as a protectorate, while other members of the political elite wanted to make the country a French colony. Both empires sided with the Defense in the war and asserted a great influence on the government through their embassies in Montevideo, to the point many French diplomats were supportive of the initiative. These proposals were exploited by the Cerrito Government's propaganda to portrait their enemies as traitors and colonialists. The Cerrito newspaper El Defensor de la Independencia Americana stated that the defense government "stinked to aristocracy and monarchism".

Many Uruguayan liberals were fond of monarchical ideals, but wanted to preserve the republic as a matter of national identity. Chancellor Ellauri, admiring the stability of the European constitutional monarchies that he had visited on his trips, proposed Uruguayan presidents to serve for 10-years terms as a way to make the republican regime as similar to the monarchical as possible.

The weight of monarchist thought among platinean liberals was emphasized by Uruguayan intellectual Francisco Bauzá, who stated that up to his time, "the official history of the Revolution has been written by monarchists".

== Carlism ==
=== Early 19th century ===
Although the Cerrito Government was explicitly against monarchy and considered it an "anti-American" institution, Carlist émigrés to the River Plate after the First Carlist War became active supporters of the faction due to their shared anti-liberal positions.

Unlike liberals loyal to Rivera, Carlists rejected constitutionalism and sought the restoration of a traditional monarchy akin to the medieval Spanish kingdoms. An ultra-royalist and reactionary movement, Carlists had sided with Infante Carlos María Isidro against Spanish constitutionalists and led an uprising against Ferdinand VII's successor, queen Isabella II. The movement had had an immense influence on the Basque Country and Catalonia.

Since 1833, many defeated Carlists had arrived to Uruguay and Argentina. They had initially fought on both sides, but the clear identification of the Defense Government with liberal and constitutionalist ideals sided them finally with the Cerrito besiegers. In 1842, Carlist guerrilla fighter Gerónimo de Amilivia placed himself and his troops at the service of Manuel Oribe during the Great Siege of Montevideo. Nearly 40,000 Carlist émigrés arrived to Uruguay after the First War, of which 4,000 would take part in the so-called "Basque Battalion" that besieged Montevideo. All members of the Battalion kept their original Carlist ranks and refused to surrender their weapons to the government after the peace treaty, leaving them at the barracks as a sign of protest.

Amilivia and other Carlists would later renounce their Blanco adherence, defining themselves as "blancos of Cerrito" and regretting the liberal pathway the party had followed afterwards. A minor group of Carlists such as José Machín or Juan Pablo Goyeneche had fought with the Colorados. Both were made colonels of the Uruguayan army and held important political positions afterwards.

=== Late 19th century ===
Cross of Burgundy, naval flag used by Habsburg Spain and latter symbol of the Carlist movement.

A new wave of Basque migrants arrived to Uruguay after the Third Carlist War, as rebel Carlists were banished from the Spanish territory. In order to aid the large amount of impoverished immigrants, the Laurak Bat society was founded in Montevideo in 1877 as a mutual aid foundation. Its members rose to more than one thousand immigrants, but the society's Carlist ties were widely criticized. Carlists took part in the foundation of many mutual aid societies in Argentina and Uruguay, contributing to the popularization of the model in Latin America.

Carlos VII visited Uruguay on his trips to Latin America, and had meetings with some local Catholic figures such as bishop Inocencio María Yéregui and landowner Hipólito Gallinal.

=== 20th century ===
Carlist media was present in Uruguay during the early 20th century and the Spanish Civil war through the Central Commission of Carlist Propaganda in South America, that published a series of monarchist newspapers from Argentina. Most Carlist associations were dissolved or lost their Carlist identity at the early 20th century.

==== Juan María Bordaberry ====
Juan María Bordaberry was the constitutional president of Uruguay from 1972 to 1973, and a civilian dictator from the 1973 Uruguayan coup d'état to his ousting by the military hierarchy in 1976. After he assumed dictatorial powers with the support of the armed forces, Bordaberry's political ideas slowly shifted towards reactionary and monarchical positions.

Despite originally a neoliberal technocrat, Bordaberry's integralist Catholicism and distrust towards political parties gradually brought him closer to Spanish traditionalism and Integrist monarchism. Inspired by the Francoist regime, he proposed the creation of a corporatist authoritarian system to the military junta with the objective of definitively abolishing partisan politics and democracy. This new regime, called "organic democracy" by Francoists, would be supposedly based on the "Christian principles of political order". His idea was rejected in 1976 by the military elite and he was removed from the presidency.

The constitutional imperative to call an election in November 1976 forced us to realize that there was no other path but to consolidate institutionally the situation of peace and order the country was living. An in that situation there was authority, there were no political parties, no universal suffrage; there was freedom, but not freedom to propagate error and evil. Put simply, the liberal foundations of our political system was not valid anymore. I think the Uruguayan people was mature enough to accept this change. The military elite was not, however, and, infected by freemasonry, they rejected my proposal.

After his ousting from power, Bordaberry came out publicly as a Carlist. The ex-president wrote many articles for international Carlist media, becoming a revered figure of the movement. After his imprisonment, the Traditionalist Communion issued a statement asking for his release, praising Bordaberry as a ruler who "followed organicist principles, restored authority and fostered economic and social progress".

In 2004 he was visited while in prison by Spanish Carlist pretender, Sixtus Henry. In May 2006 he was made a knight of the Order of Prohibited Legitimacy by the Duke of Aranjuez.

==== Álvaro Pacheco Seré ====
Álvaro Pacheco Seré (1935-2006) was a Uruguayan lawyer and close friend of Bordaberry, designated by him as his personal secretary. Pacheco resigned his position after Bordaberry's removal and followed him in his Carlist affiliation. He joined the Buenos Aires Traditionalist Brotherhood Carlos VII and was a member of the Society of Traditionalist Studies Juan Vázquez de Mella. He served as an editor of the society's magazine and worked for the Institute for Genealogical studies of Uruguay.

== See also ==
- Monarchism in Brazil
- Panhispanism
- Tradition, Family, Property
