= Joaquín Martínez Arboleya =

Uruguayan writer and filmmaker

Joaquín Martínez Arboleya, also known by his pseudonym Santicaten (Montevideo, 30 December 1900 – 1984) was a Uruguayan film director and producer, businessman, novelist, essayist and writer. He was one of the most widely-read Uruguayan authors in the 1970s, having published more than 40 books.

== Filmography ==
=== Director ===
- Alma y nervio de España (1937)
- Primer noticiario especial para América (1937)
- La guerra por la paz (1937)
- España azul (1937)
- Segundo noticiario intercontinental (1938)
- Suspiros de España (1938)
- Voluntad - Falange en la Argentina (1938)
- Esta tierra es mía (1948)

=== Screenwriter ===
- Alma y nervio de España (1937)
- Esta tierra es mía (1948)

=== Producer ===
- Uruguayos campeones (1948)

== Selected literary works ==
- Trozos de vida (1927)
- Mujer (1929)
- Mujercitas (1929)
- Madame Drumm (1931)
- Por orden del sultán (1931)
- Juan Carlos Salazar (1932)
- Jenny, la mujer fatal de su vida (1935)
- Por qué luché contra los rojos (1961)
- Uruguay, año 2000 (1961)
- El error de Estados Unidos (1961)
- El país del miedo (1962)
- El loco del lago (1962)
- Campo de Mayo (1962)
- Luz mala (1963)
- Horizontes cerrados (1963)
- Trilogía histórica (1963)
- Proceso a Sodoma (1964)
- Océano Atlántico, esquina Río de la Plata (1964)
- Esta tierra es mía (1964)
- Aberración (1964)
- La cama:("trabajo" en 3 etapas) (1965)
- Las dos dimensiones (1965)
- El pantano (1966)
- ¡Oh deidad!... ¡Oh estiércol!... : ("comedia satírica" en tres actos) (1966)
- El camino (1967)
- Trilogía del crimen (1968)
- 1968: Novela verdad (1969)
- La maffia peroniana sobre el Río de la Plata (1969)
- Caos: Guerra Civil Española (1969)
- Versos de rompe y raja (1970)
- Nací en Montevideo (1971)
- Uruguay: al reencuentro de su destino: crónica de una revolución (1973)
- Charlas con el general Stroessner (1973)
- Ramón Pardías (1975)
- Versos con alma y vida (1976)
- Mundo podrido (1976)
- Arroz y cicuta (1977)
- Cuando el diablo no tiene qué hacer... con la cola espanta las moscas (1977)
- Rosa Rosa (1978)
- Por obra y gracia (1979)
- Elecciones sí, relajo no (1980)
- Una de 2...: Primer tiempo (1983)
