= List of diplomatic missions of Uruguay =

This is a list of diplomatic missions of Uruguay, excluding honorary consulates.

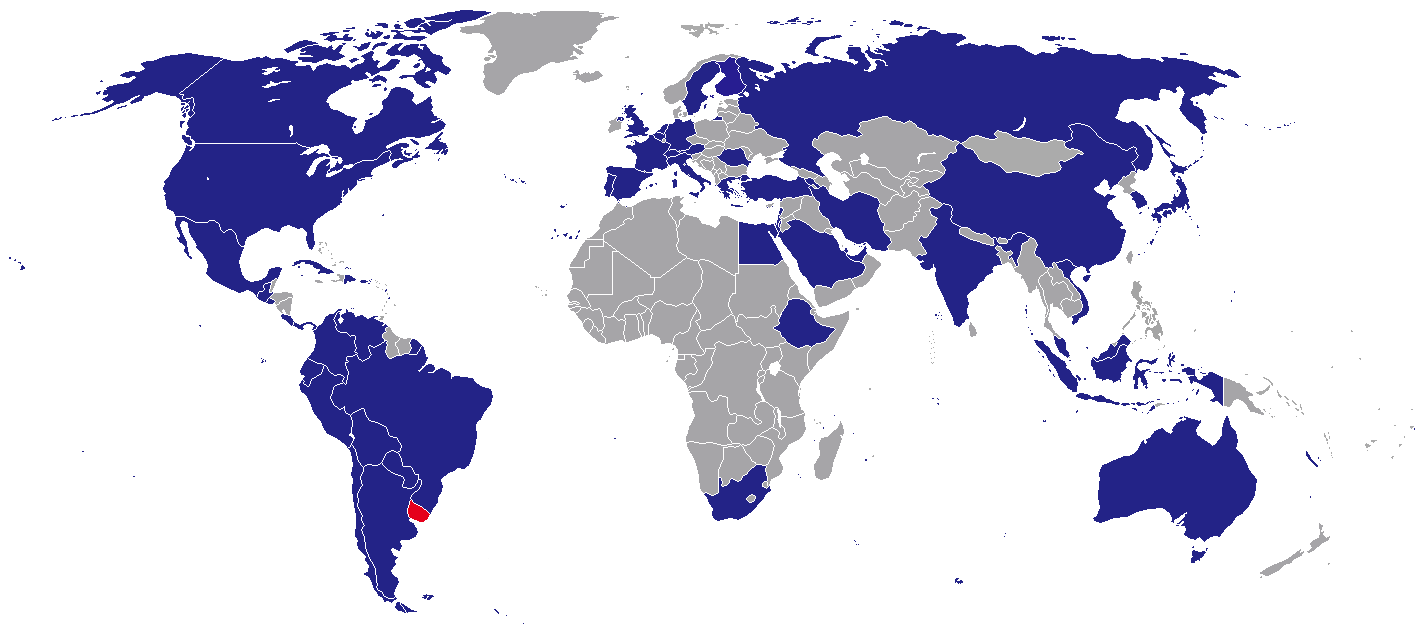
Map of countries with Uruguayan embassies and consulates-general

== Current missions ==
=== Africa ===
| Host country | Host city | Mission | Concurrent accreditation | Ref. |
|---|---|---|---|---|
| Egypt | Cairo | Embassy | Countries: Jordan; Libya; Tunisia; Consular jurisdiction only: (Note: The following countries are listed only under the consular jurisdiction of the Uruguayan embassy in Cairo; it is unknown whether the ambassador is accredited to any of them.); Benin; Burkina Faso; Cameroon; Cape Verde; Central African Republic; Chad; Djibouti; Eritrea; Gambia; Guinea; Guinea-Bissau; Ivory Coast; Liberia; Mali; Mauritania; Niger; Sahrawi Republic; São Tomé and Príncipe; Sierra Leone; Sudan; Togo | |
| Ethiopia | Addis Ababa | Embassy | Countries: Angola; Kenya; International Organizations: African Union (Note: Accredited as an observer mission.); United Nations Environment Programme | |
| South Africa | Pretoria | Embassy | Countries: Botswana; Congo-Kinshasa; Ghana; Mozambique; Namibia; Nigeria; Zimbabwe; Consular jurisdiction only: (Note: The following countries are listed only under the consular jurisdiction of the Uruguayan embassy in Pretoria; it is unknown whether the ambassador is accredited to any of them.); Burundi; Comoros; Equatorial Guinea; Eswatini; Gabon; Lesotho; Madagascar; Malawi; Mauritius; Rwanda; Seychelles; Somalia; Tanzania; Uganda; Zambia | |

=== Americas ===
| Host country | Host city | Mission | Concurrent accreditation | Ref. |
|---|---|---|---|---|
| Argentina | Buenos Aires | Embassy | | |
| Argentina | Buenos Aires | Consulate-General | | |
| Argentina | Córdoba | Consulate-General | | |
| Argentina | Rosario | Consulate-General | | |
| Argentina | Colón | Consulate | | |
| Argentina | Concordia | Consulate | | |
| Argentina | Gualeguaychú | Consulate | | |
| Bolivia | La Paz | Embassy | | |
| Bolivia | Santa Cruz de la Sierra | Consulate-General | | |
| Brazil | Brasília | Embassy | Countries: Guyana; Suriname | |
| Brazil | Florianópolis | Consulate-General | Countries: Guyana; Suriname | |
| Brazil | Porto Alegre | Consulate-General | Countries: Guyana; Suriname | |
| Brazil | Rio de Janeiro | Consulate-General | Countries: Guyana; Suriname | |
| Brazil | São Paulo | Consulate-General | Countries: Guyana; Suriname | |
| Brazil | Bagé | Consulate | Countries: Guyana; Suriname | |
| Brazil | Belo Horizonte | Consulate | Countries: Guyana; Suriname | |
| Brazil | Chuí | Consulate | Countries: Guyana; Suriname | |
| Brazil | Jaguarão | Consulate | Countries: Guyana; Suriname | |
| Brazil | Quaraí | Consulate | Countries: Guyana; Suriname | |
| Brazil | Santana do Livramento | Consulate | Countries: Guyana; Suriname | |
| Canada | Ottawa | Embassy | | |
| Canada | Montreal | Consulate-General | | |
| Canada | Toronto | Consulate-General | | |
| Chile | Santiago de Chile | Embassy | | |
| Colombia | Bogotá | Embassy | | |
| Costa Rica | San José | Embassy | | |
| Cuba | Havana | Embassy | Countries: Bahamas; Jamaica; Saint Kitts and Nevis | |
| Dominican Republic | Santo Domingo | Embassy | Countries: Barbados; Haiti | |
| Ecuador | Quito | Embassy | | |
| El Salvador | San Salvador | Embassy | | |
| Guatemala | Guatemala City | Embassy | Countries: Belize; Honduras; Nicaragua | |
| Mexico | Mexico City | Embassy | | |
| Mexico | Mexico City | Consulate-General | | |
| Panama | Panama City | Embassy | | |
| Paraguay | Asunción | Embassy | | |
| Peru | Lima | Embassy | | |
| United States | Washington, D.C. | Embassy | Countries: Dominica; Grenada; Saint Lucia; Saint Vincent and the Grenadines | |
| United States | Miami | Consulate-General | Countries: Dominica; Grenada; Saint Lucia; Saint Vincent and the Grenadines | |
| United States | New York City | Consulate-General | Countries: Dominica; Grenada; Saint Lucia; Saint Vincent and the Grenadines | |
| United States | San Francisco | Consulate-General | Countries: Dominica; Grenada; Saint Lucia; Saint Vincent and the Grenadines | |
| Venezuela | Caracas | Consular section | Countries: Trinidad and Tobago | |

=== Asia ===
| Host country | Host city | Mission | Concurrent accreditation | Ref. |
|---|---|---|---|---|
| Armenia | Yerevan | Embassy | | |
| China | Beijing | Embassy | Countries: Kyrgyzstan; Mongolia; Tajikistan | |
| China | Chongqing | Consulate-General | Countries: Kyrgyzstan; Mongolia; Tajikistan | |
| China | Guangzhou | Consulate-General | Countries: Kyrgyzstan; Mongolia; Tajikistan | |
| China | Hong Kong | Consulate-General | Countries: Kyrgyzstan; Mongolia; Tajikistan | |
| China | Shanghai | Consulate-General | Countries: Kyrgyzstan; Mongolia; Tajikistan | |
| India | New Delhi | Embassy | Countries: Bangladesh; Nepal; Sri Lanka; Consular jurisdiction only: (Note: The following countries are listed only under the consular jurisdiction of the Uruguayan embassy in New Delhi; it is unknown whether the ambassador is accredited to any of them.); Bhutan; Maldives | |
| Indonesia | Jakarta | Embassy | Countries: Philippines; International Organizations: Association of Southeast Asian Nations | |
| Iran | Tehran | Embassy | Countries: Afghanistan; Pakistan; Turkmenistan | |
| Israel | Tel Aviv | Embassy | | |
| Japan | Tokyo | Embassy | | |
| Lebanon | Beirut | Embassy | Countries: Cyprus; Syria | |
| Malaysia | Kuala Lumpur | Embassy | Countries: Brunei; Cambodia; Thailand | |
| Palestine | Ramallah | Embassy | | |
| Qatar | Doha | Embassy | | |
| Saudi Arabia | Riyadh | Embassy | Countries: Bahrain; Iraq; Kuwait; Oman; Yemen | |
| South Korea | Seoul | Embassy | | |
| Turkey | Ankara | Embassy | | |
| Turkey | Istanbul | Consulate-General | | |
| United Arab Emirates | Abu Dhabi | Embassy | International Organizations: International Renewable Energy Agency | |
| Vietnam | Hanoi | Embassy | Countries: Singapore; Consular jurisdiction only: (Note: The following countries are listed only under the consular jurisdiction of the Uruguayan embassy in Hanoi; it is unknown whether the ambassador is accredited to any of them.); Laos; Myanmar | |

=== Europe ===
| Host country | Host city | Mission | Concurrent accreditation | Ref. |
|---|---|---|---|---|
| Austria | Vienna | Embassy | Countries: Czechia; Hungary; Slovakia; International Organizations: United Nations; International Atomic Energy Agency; UNIDO; UNODC; UNCITRAL | |
| Belgium | Brussels | Embassy | Countries: Luxembourg; International Organizations: European Union | |
| Finland | Helsinki | Embassy | Countries: Estonia; Latvia; Lithuania; Poland | |
| France | Paris | Embassy | Countries: Algeria; Monaco; Senegal | |
| Germany | Berlin | Embassy | | |
| Germany | Hamburg | Consulate-General | | |
| Greece | Athens | Embassy | Countries: Bosnia and Herzegovina; Montenegro | |
| Holy See (Note: The Uruguayan Embassy to the Holy See is located outside Vatican territory in Rome.) | Rome | Embassy | Sovereign entity: Sovereign Military Order of Malta | |
| Italy | Rome | Embassy | Countries: Albania; Croatia; Malta; San Marino; Slovenia | |
| Italy | Milan | Consulate-General | Countries: Albania; Croatia; Malta; San Marino; Slovenia | |
| Netherlands | The Hague | Embassy | International Organizations: Organisation for the Prohibition of Chemical Weapons | |
| Portugal | Lisbon | Embassy | | |
| Romania | Bucharest | Embassy | Countries: Bulgaria; Georgia; Moldova; North Macedonia; Serbia; Ukraine | |
| Russia | Moscow | Embassy | Countries: Azerbaijan; Belarus; Kazakhstan; Uzbekistan | |
| Spain | Madrid | Embassy | Countries: Andorra; Morocco | |
| Spain | Madrid | Consulate-General | Countries: Andorra; Morocco | |
| Spain | Barcelona | Consulate-General | Countries: Andorra; Morocco | |
| Spain | Las Palmas | Consulate-General | Countries: Andorra; Morocco | |
| Spain | Santiago de Compostela | Consulate-General | Countries: Andorra; Morocco | |
| Spain | Valencia | Consulate-General | Countries: Andorra; Morocco | |
| Sweden | Stockholm | Embassy | Countries: Denmark; Iceland; Norway | |
| Switzerland | Bern | Embassy | Countries: Liechtenstein | |
| United Kingdom | London | Embassy | Countries: Ireland; International Organizations: International Maritime Organization; International Coffee Organization; International Sugar Organization; International Whaling Commission | |

=== Oceania ===
| Host country | Host city | Mission | Concurrent accreditation | Ref. |
|---|---|---|---|---|
| Australia | Canberra | Embassy | Countries: Fiji; New Zealand; Timor-Leste | |
| Australia | Sydney | Consulate-General | Countries: Consular jurisdiction only: (Note: The following countries are listed only under the consular jurisdiction of the Uruguayan consulate-general in Sydney; it is unknown whether the embassy in Canberra is accredited to any of them.); Cook Islands; Kiribati; Marshall Islands; Micronesia; Nauru; Niue; Palau; Papua New Guinea; Samoa; Solomon Islands; Tonga; Tuvalu; Vanuatu | |

=== Multilateral organizations ===
| Organization | Host country | Host city | Mission | Concurrent accreditation |
|---|---|---|---|---|
| Food and Agriculture Organization | Italy | Rome | Permanent Mission | International Organizations: International Fund for Agricultural Development; World Food Programme |
| Mercosur | Uruguay | Montevideo | Permanent Mission | International Organizations: Latin American Integration Association |
| Organization of American States | United States | Washington, D.C. | Permanent Mission | |
| UNESCO | France | Paris | Permanent Mission | |
| United Nations | United States | New York City | Permanent Mission | |
| United Nations | Switzerland | Geneva | Permanent Mission | International Organizations: World Trade Organization |

== Gallery ==
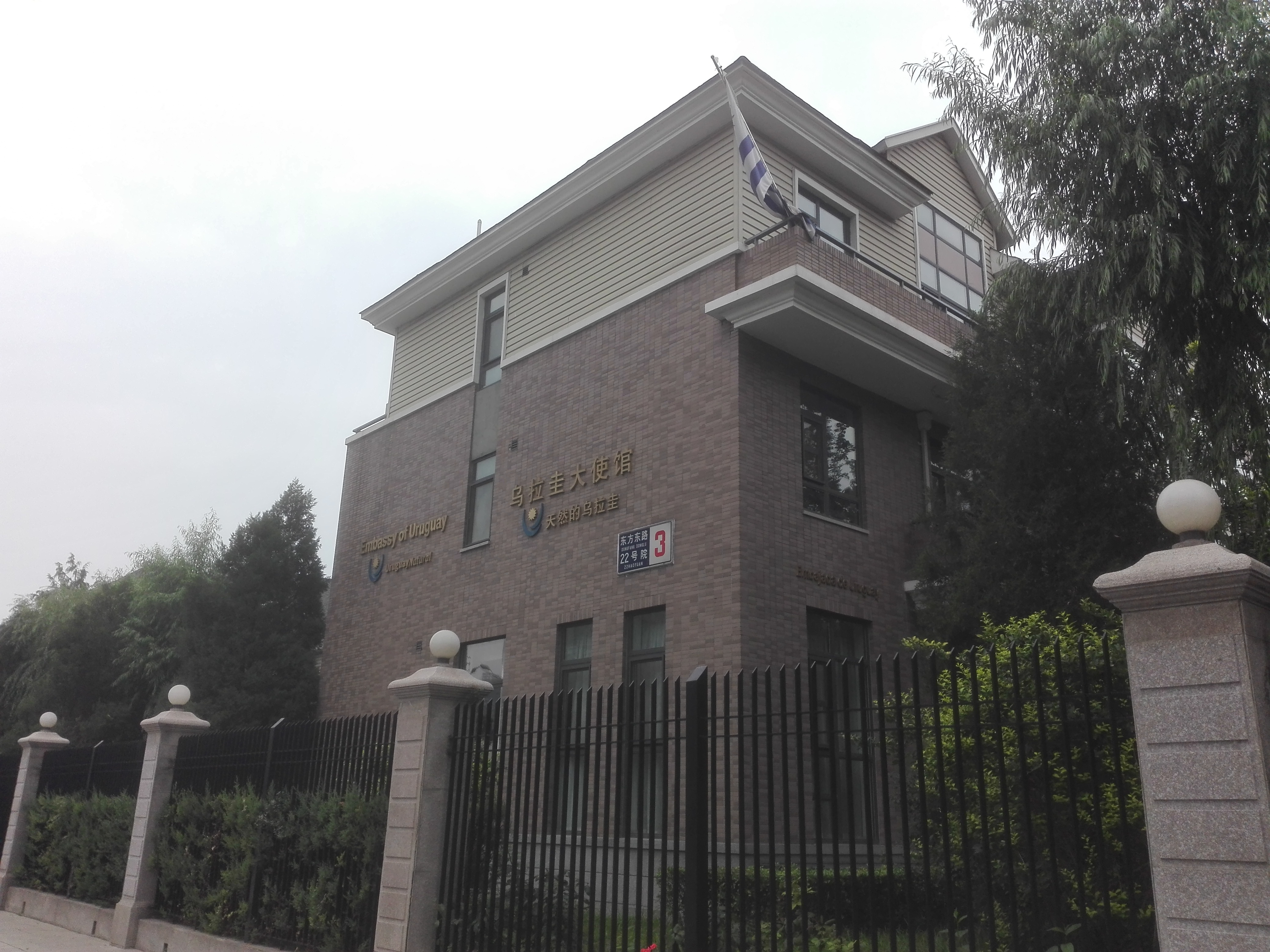
Embassy in Beijing

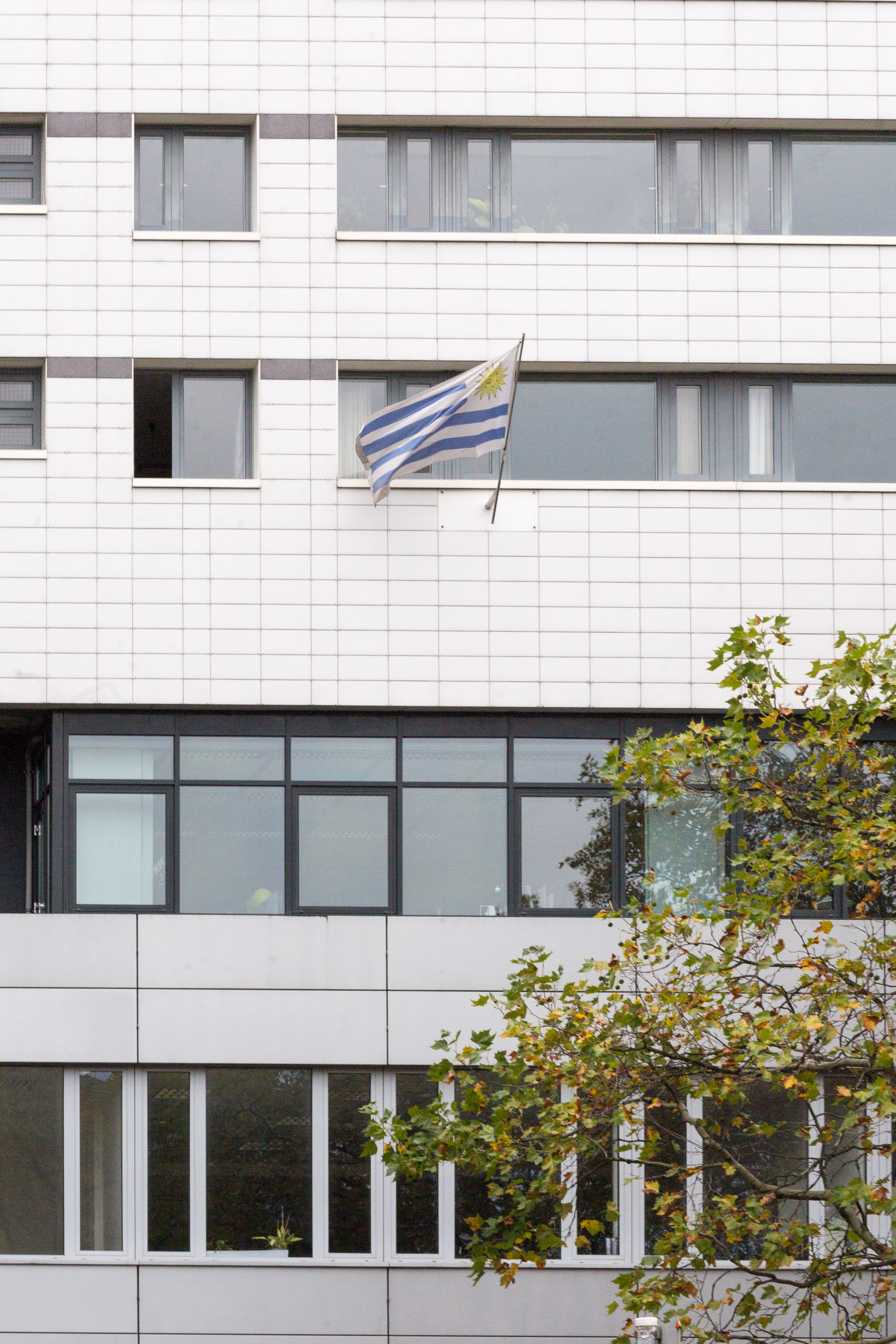
Embassy in Berlin

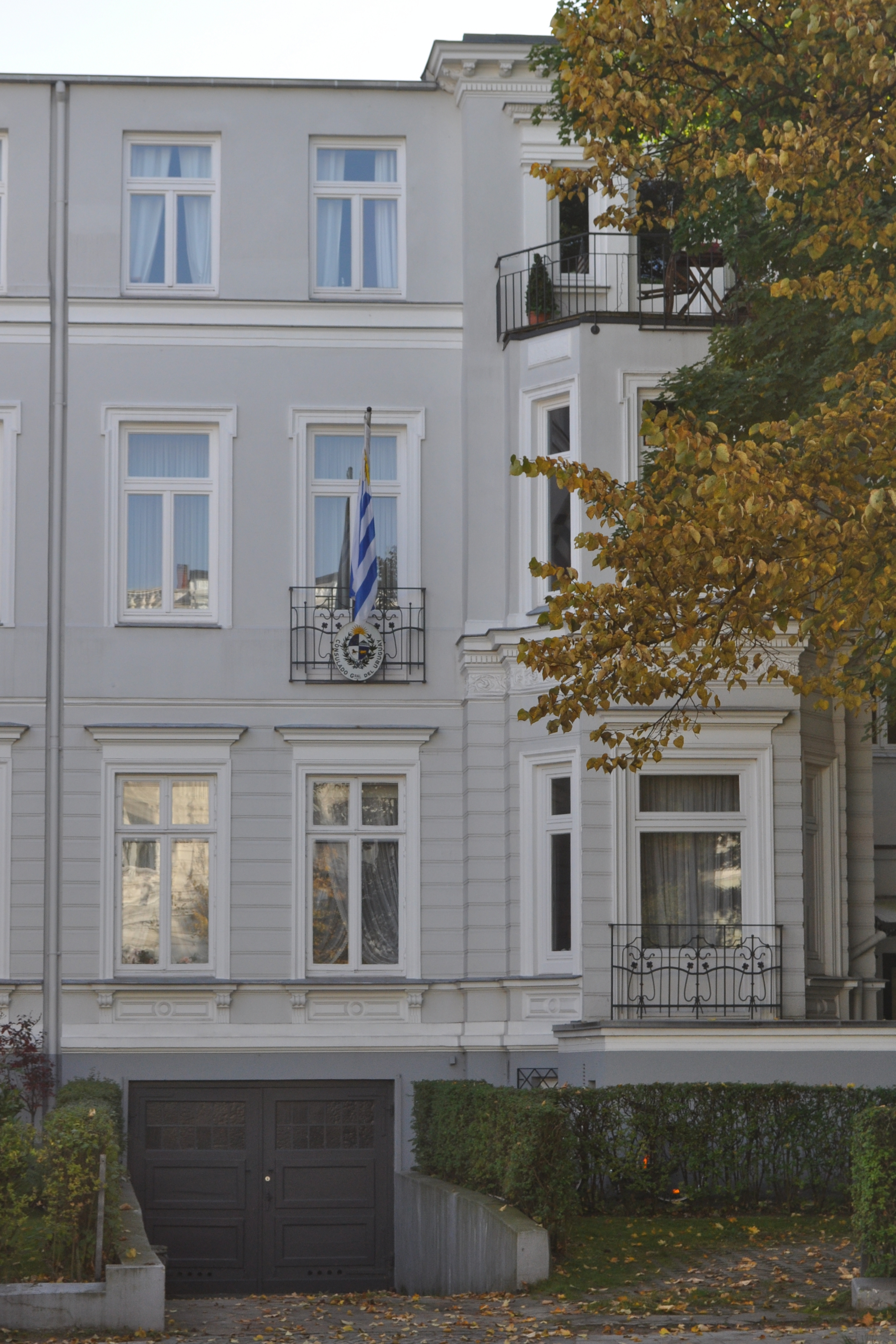
Consulate-General in Hamburg

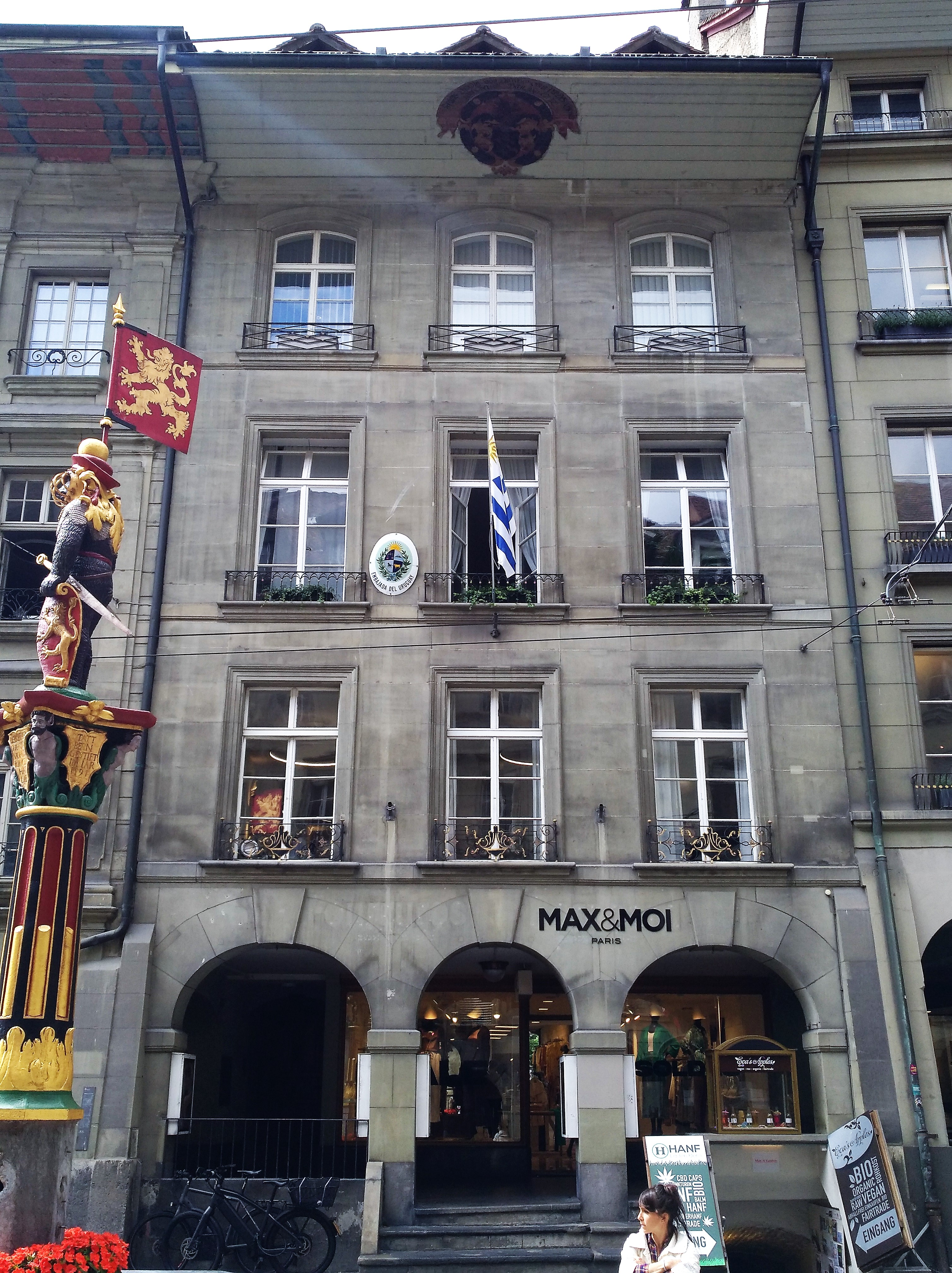
Embassy in Bern

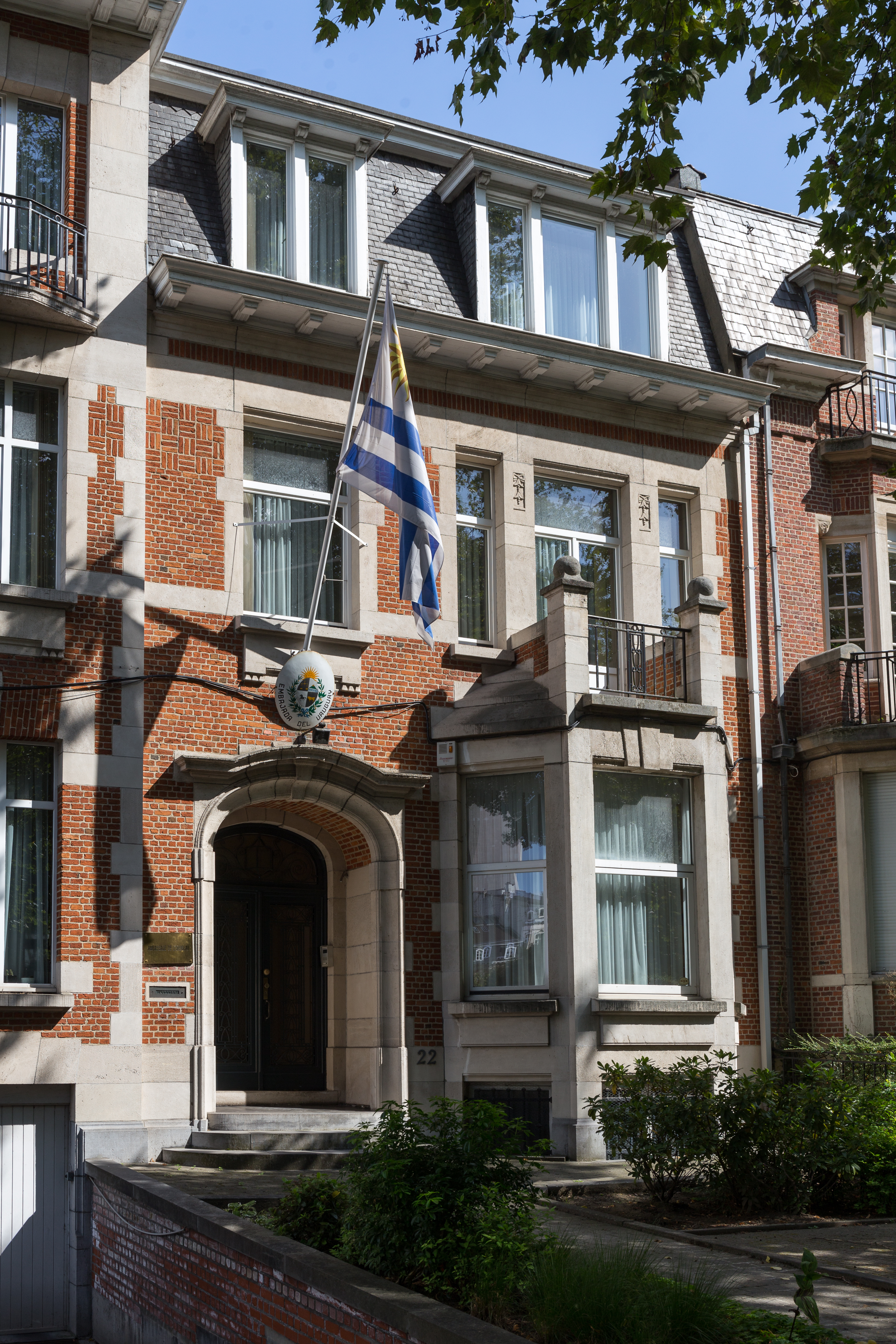
Embassy in Brussels

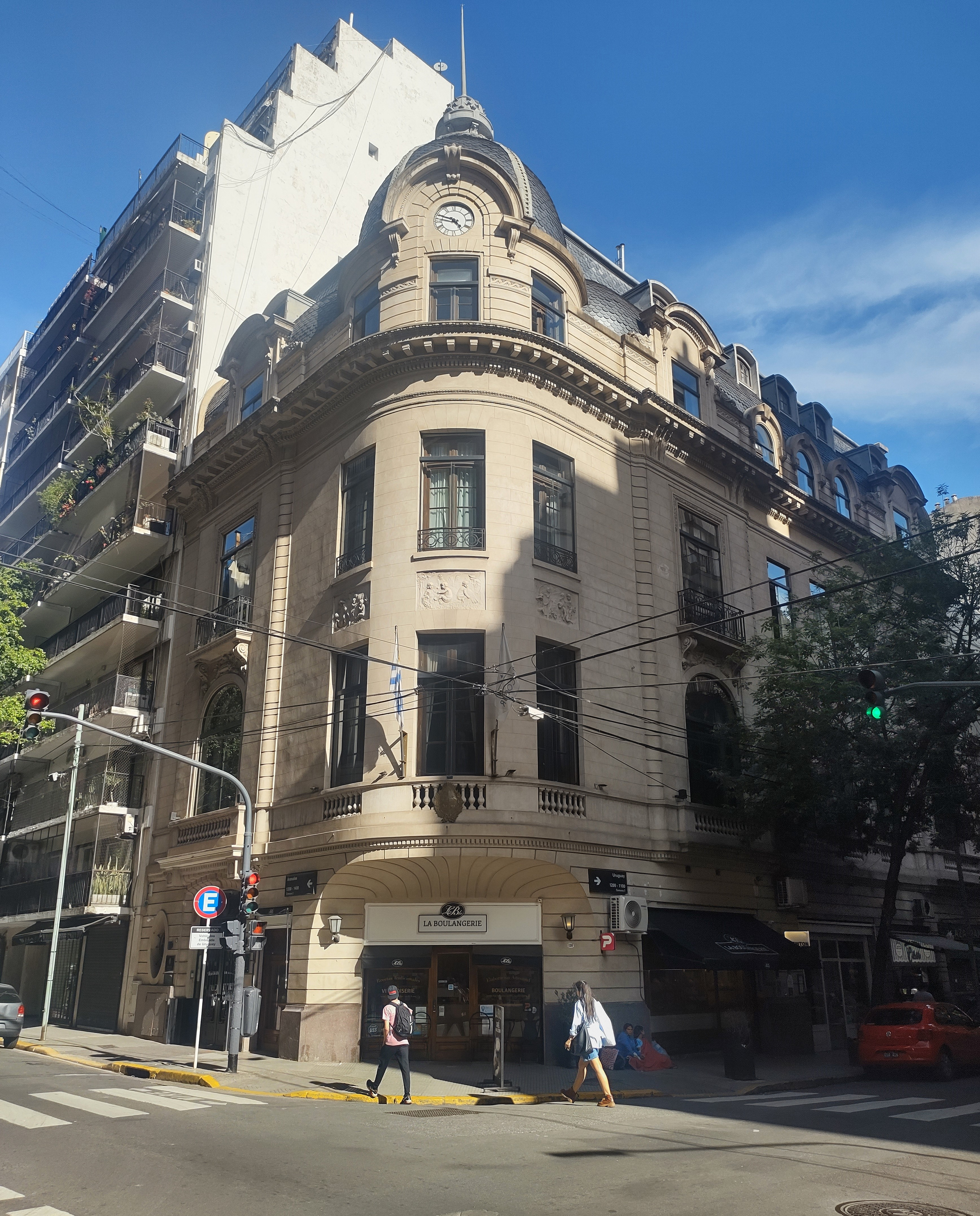
Embassy in Buenos Aires

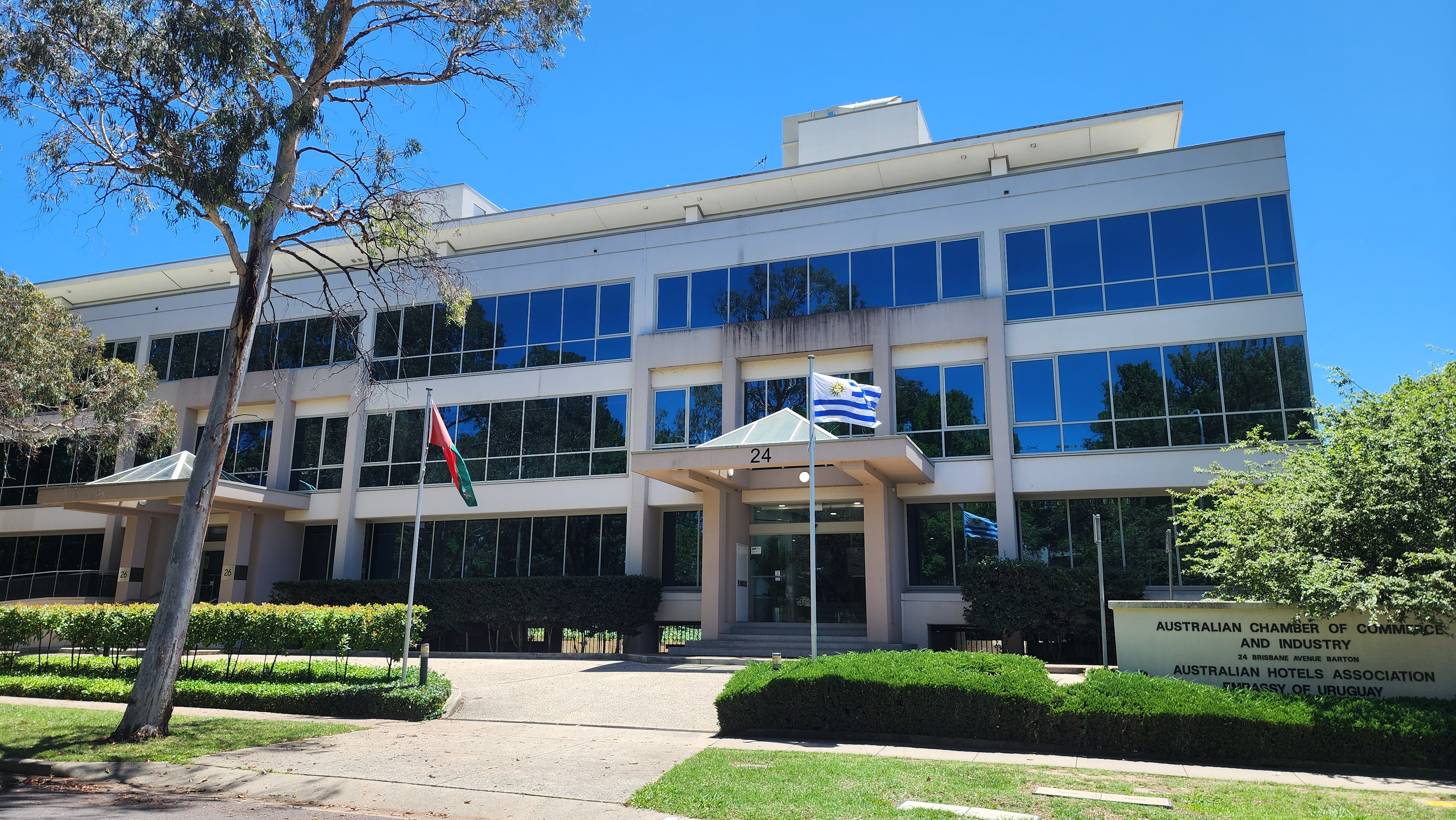
Building hosting the Embassy in Canberra

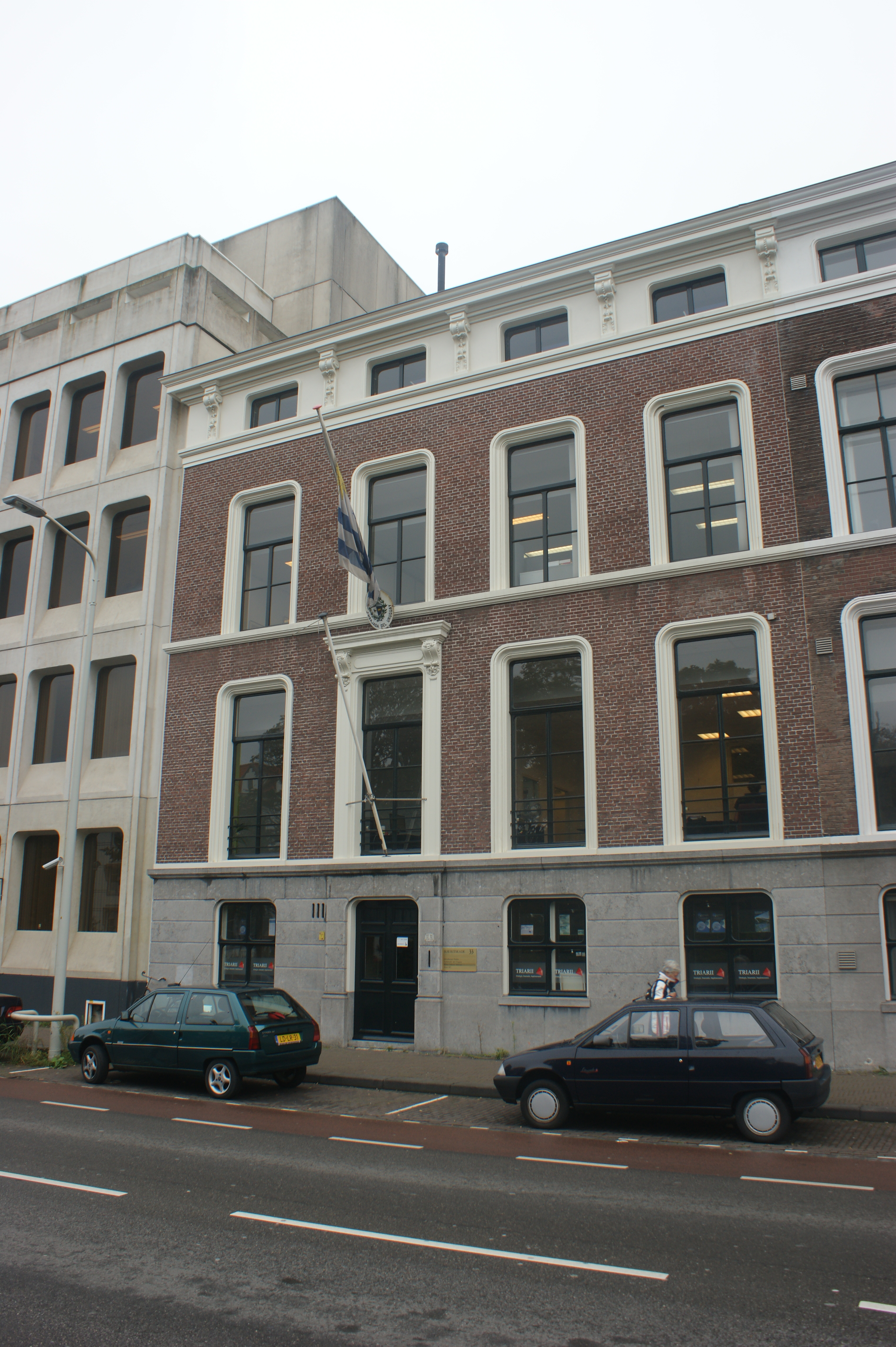
Embassy in The Hague

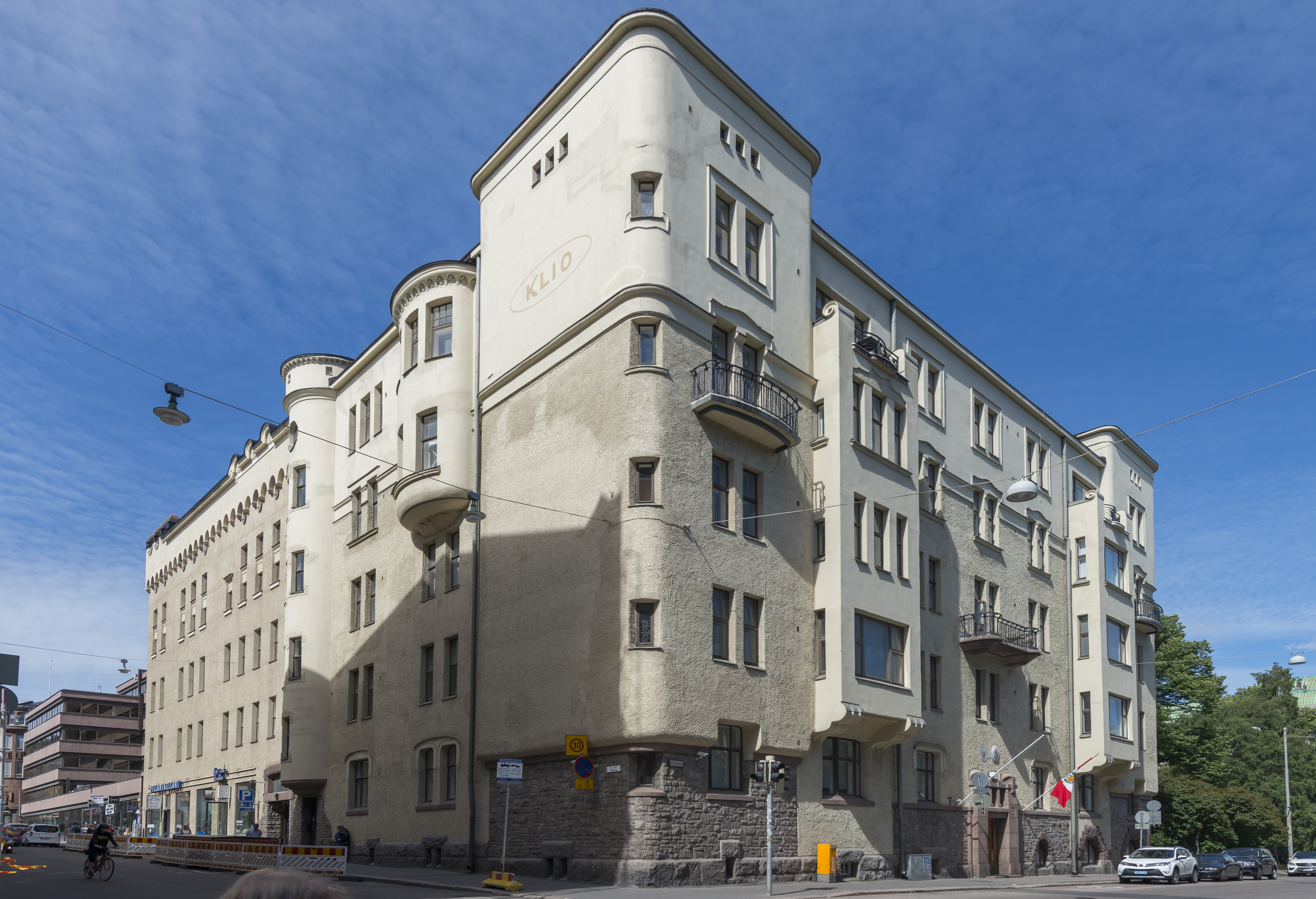
Building hosting the Embassy in Helsinki

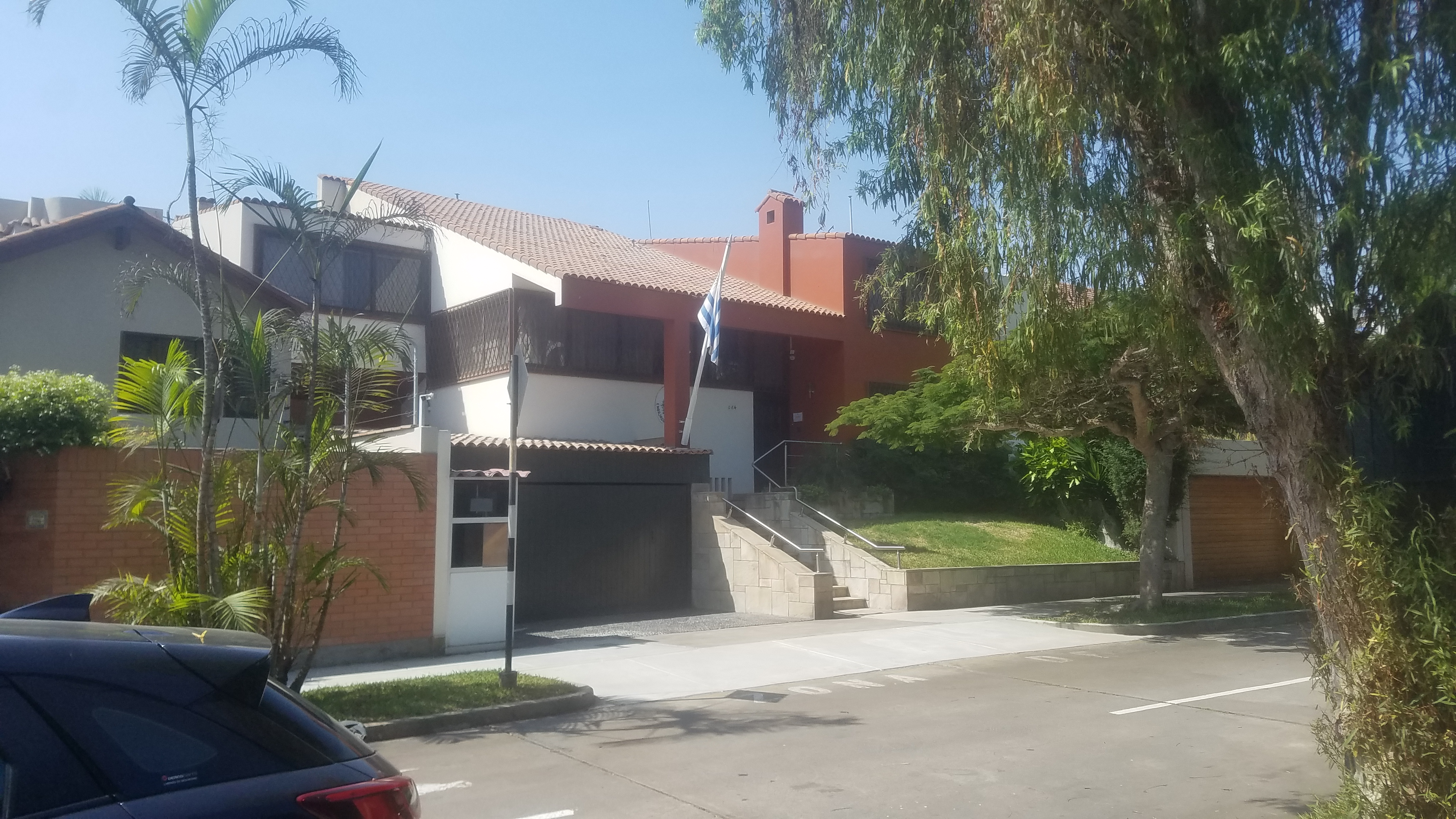
Embassy in Lima

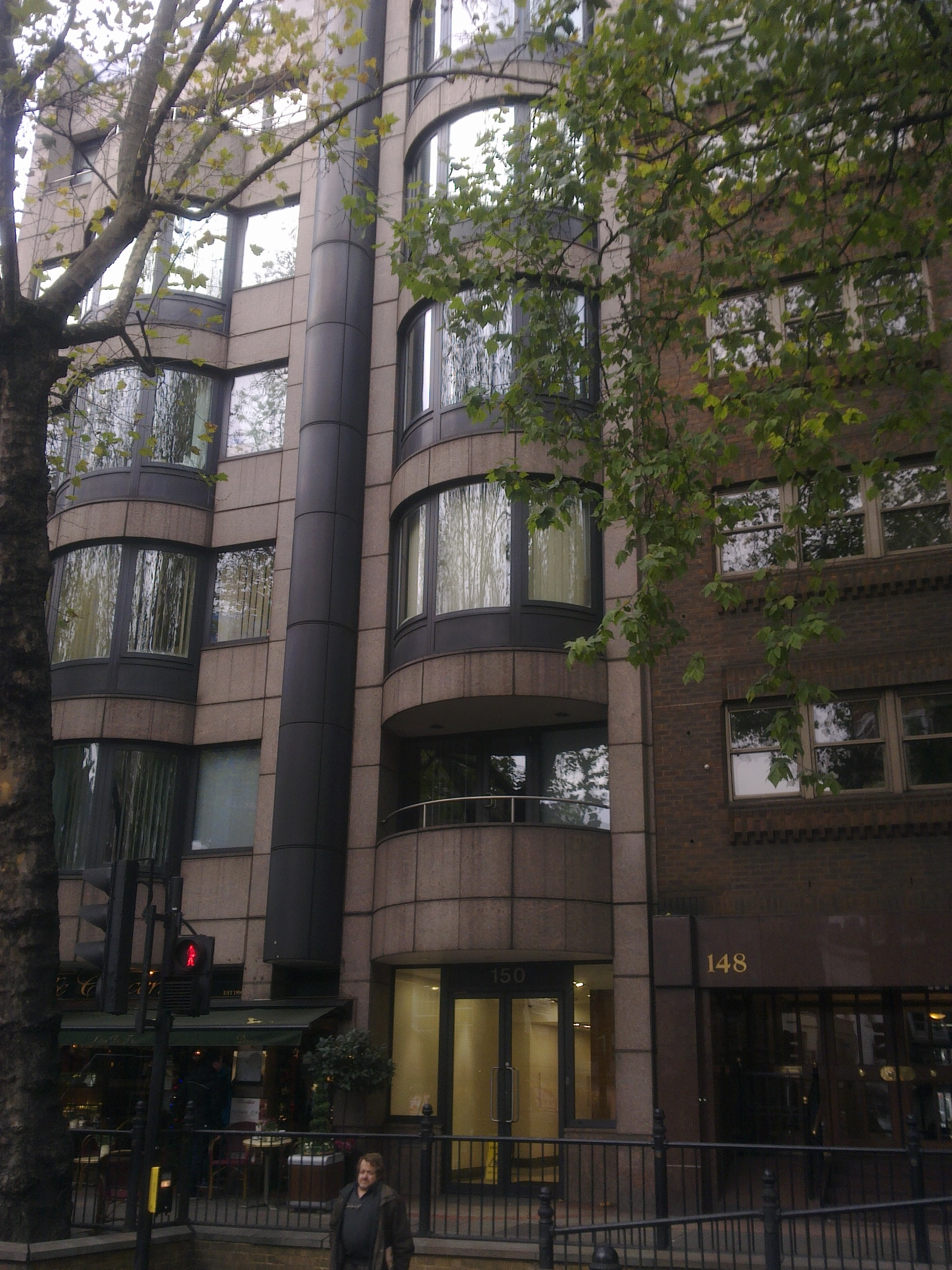
Embassy in London

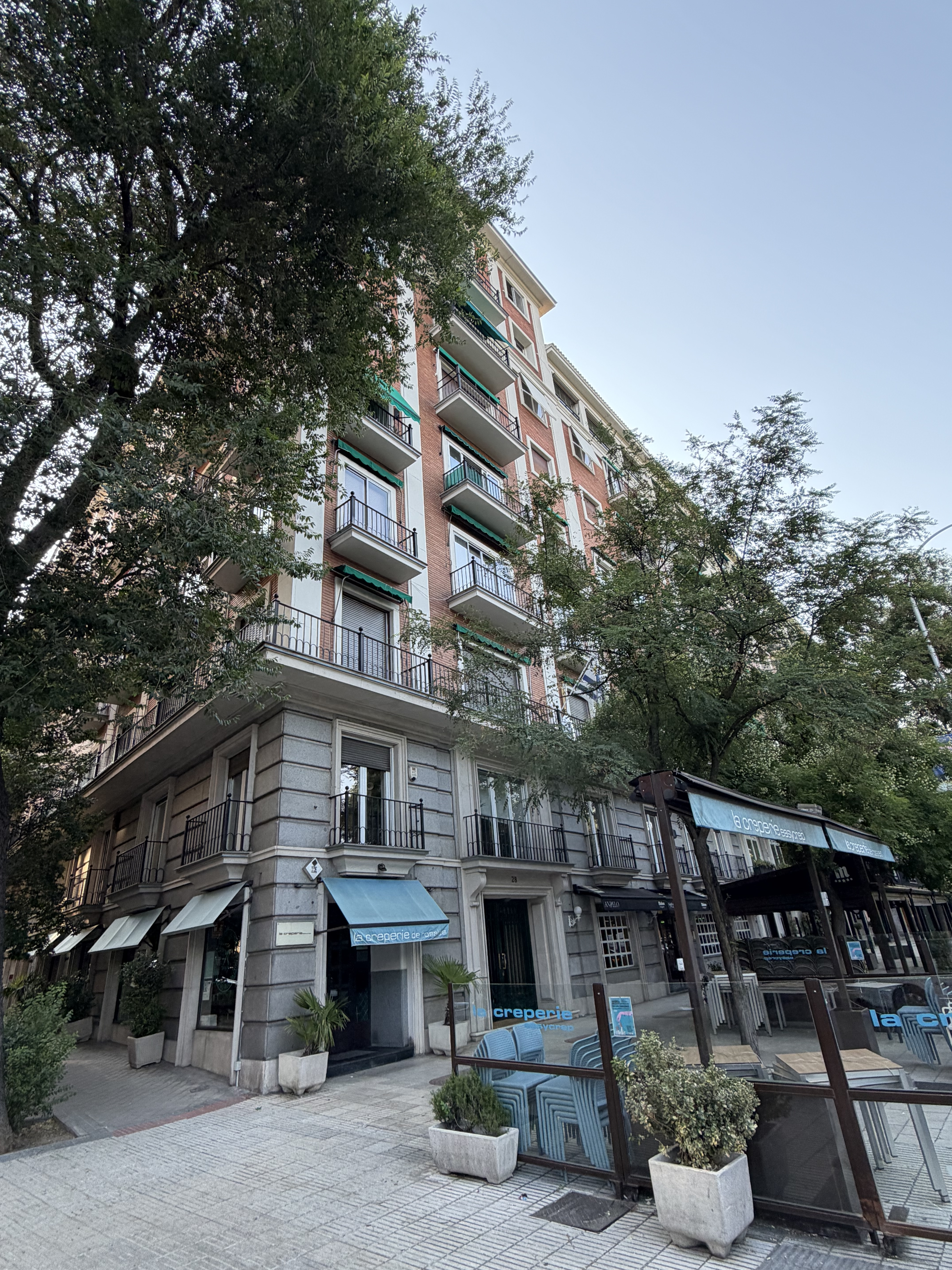
Building hosting the Embassy in Madrid

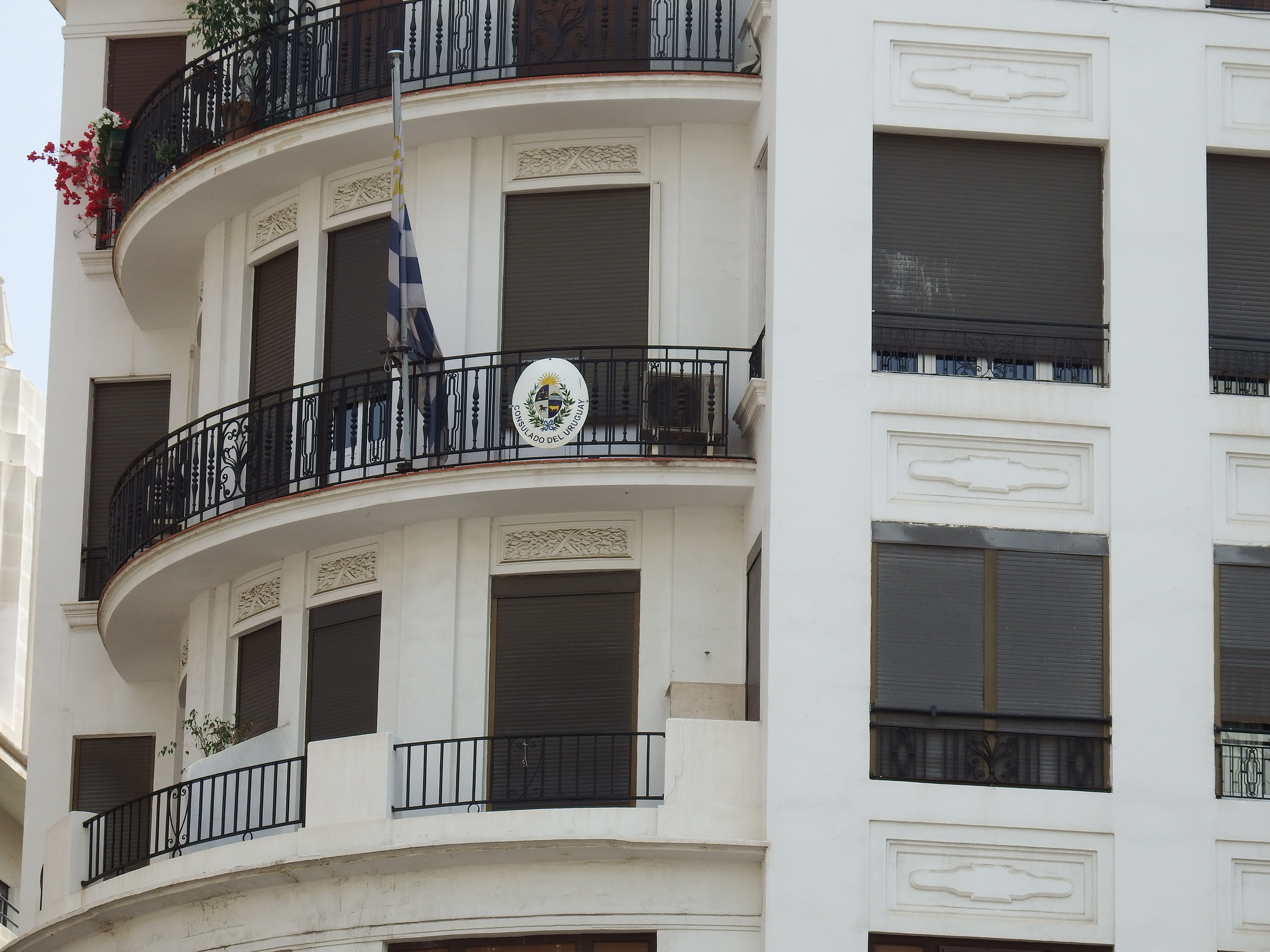
Building hosting the Consulate-General in Valencia

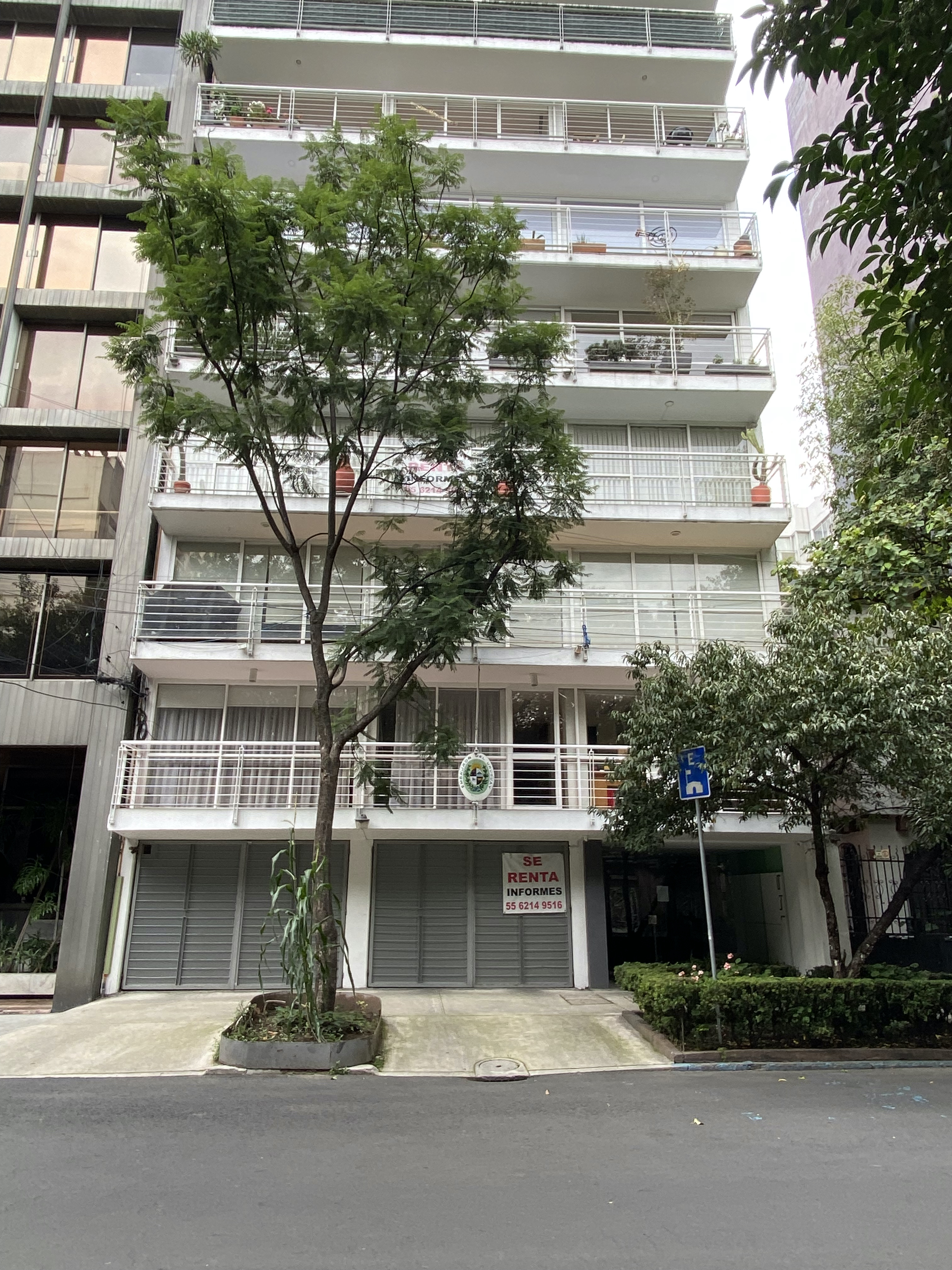
Building hosting the Embassy in Mexico City

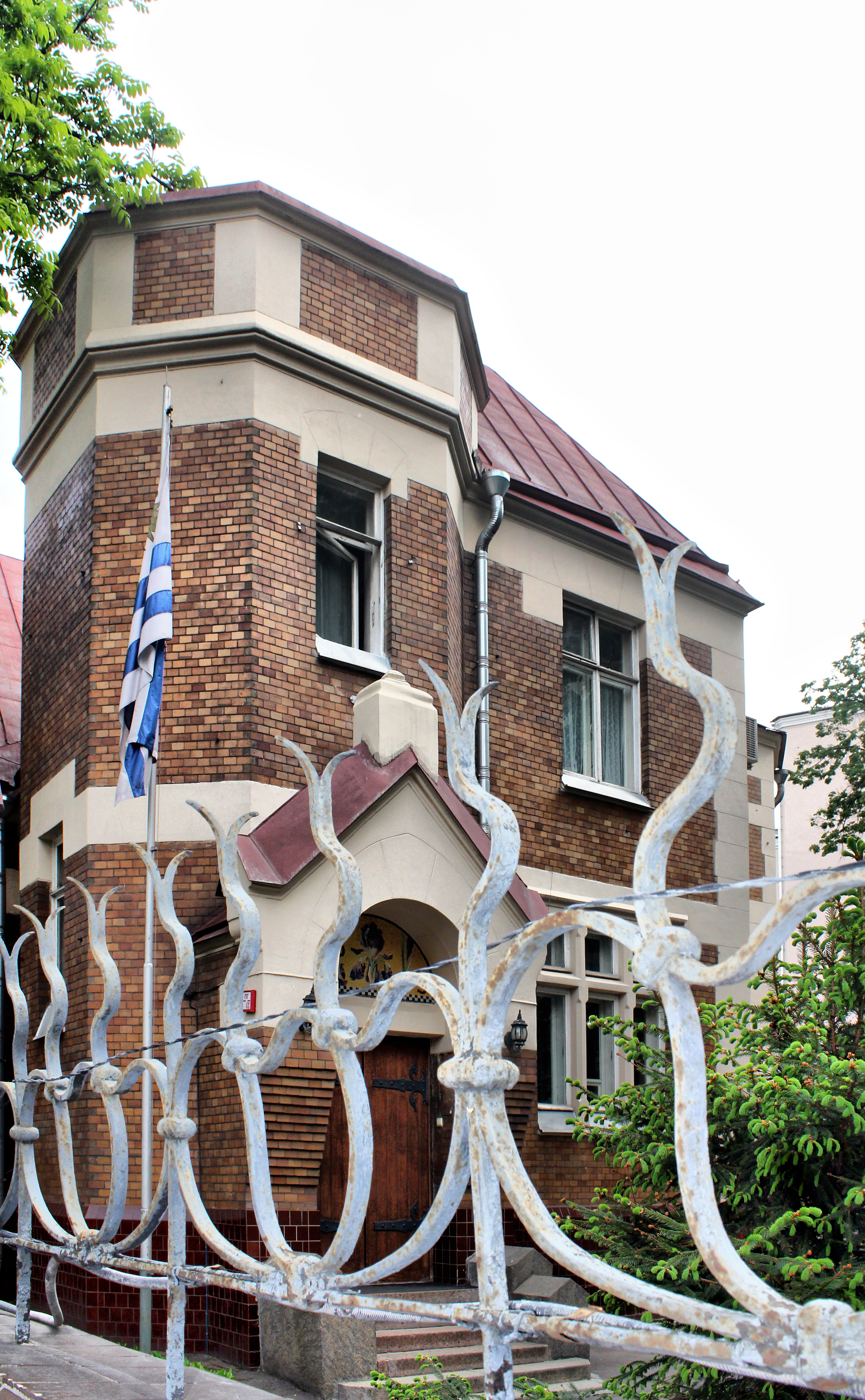
Embassy in Moscow

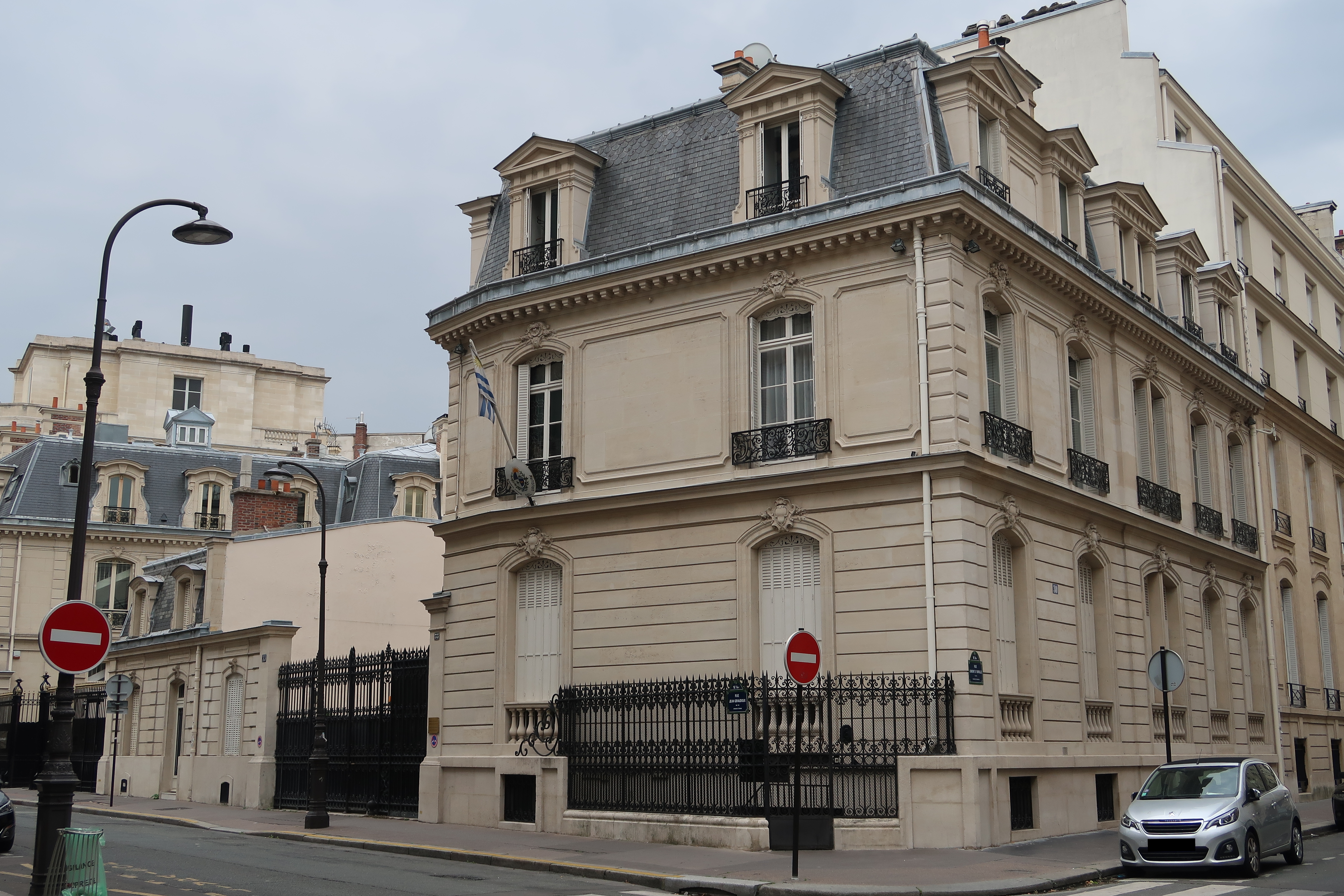
Embassy in Paris

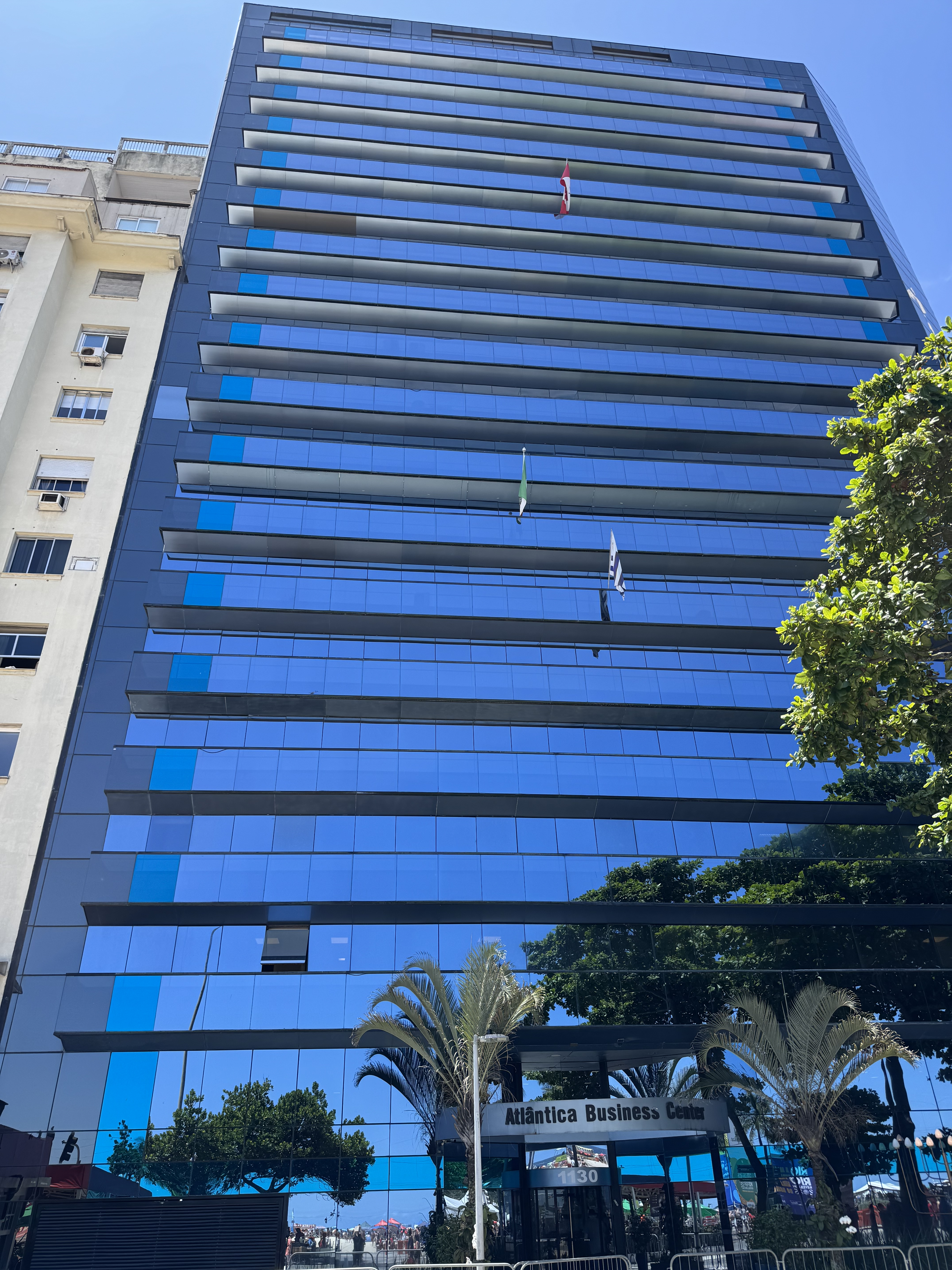
Building hosting the Consulate-General in Rio de Janeiro

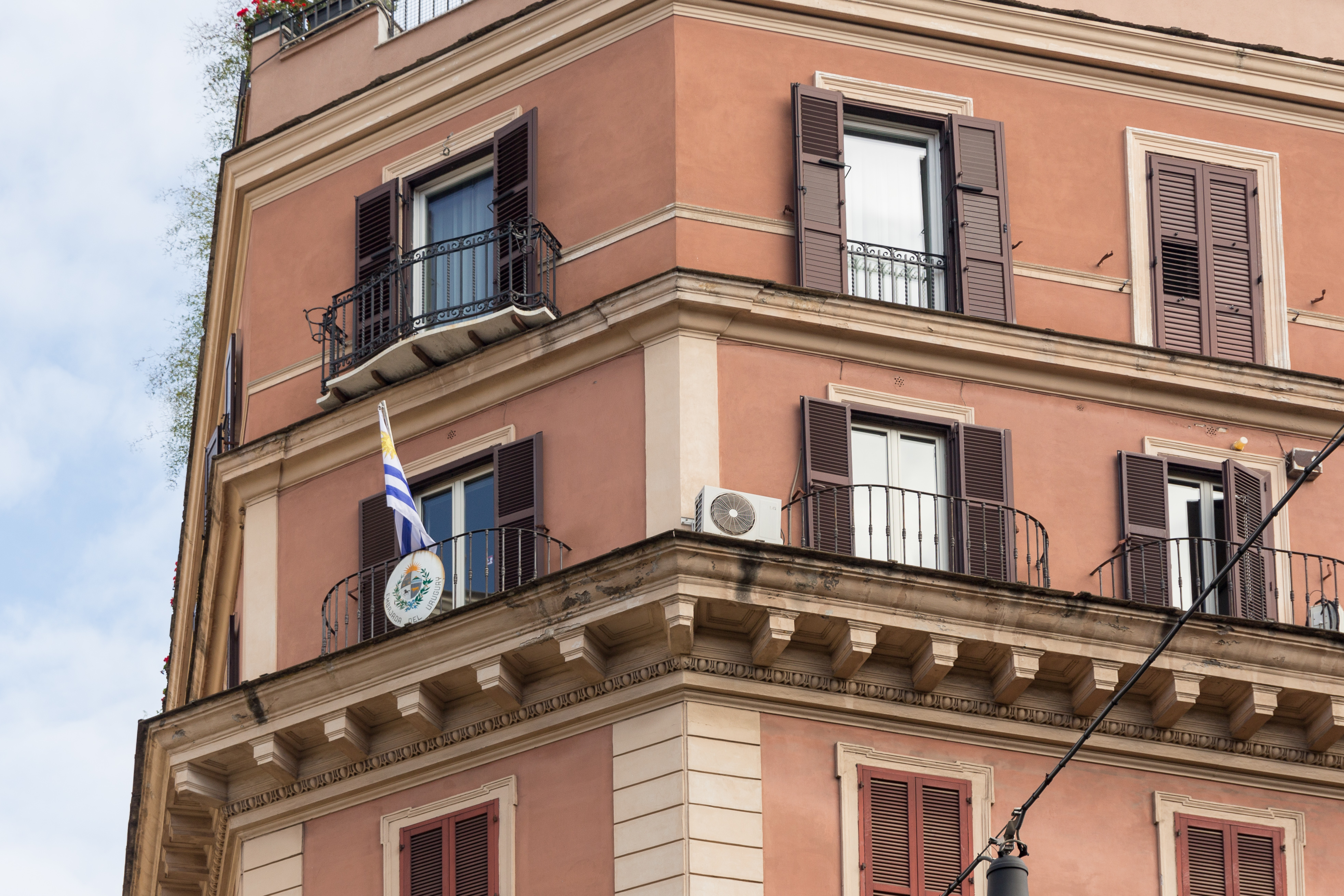
Embassy in Rome

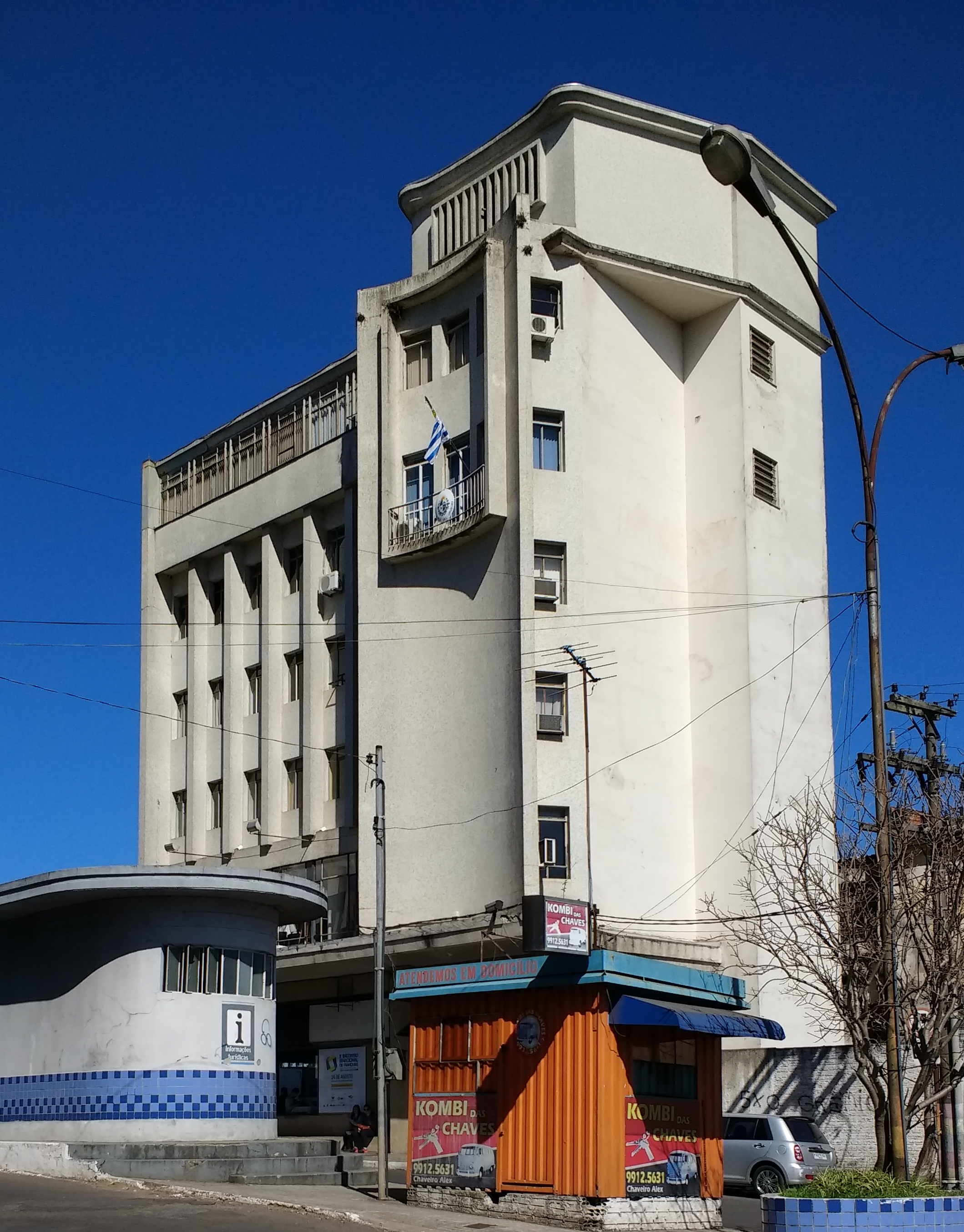
Building hosting the Consulate in Santana do Livramento

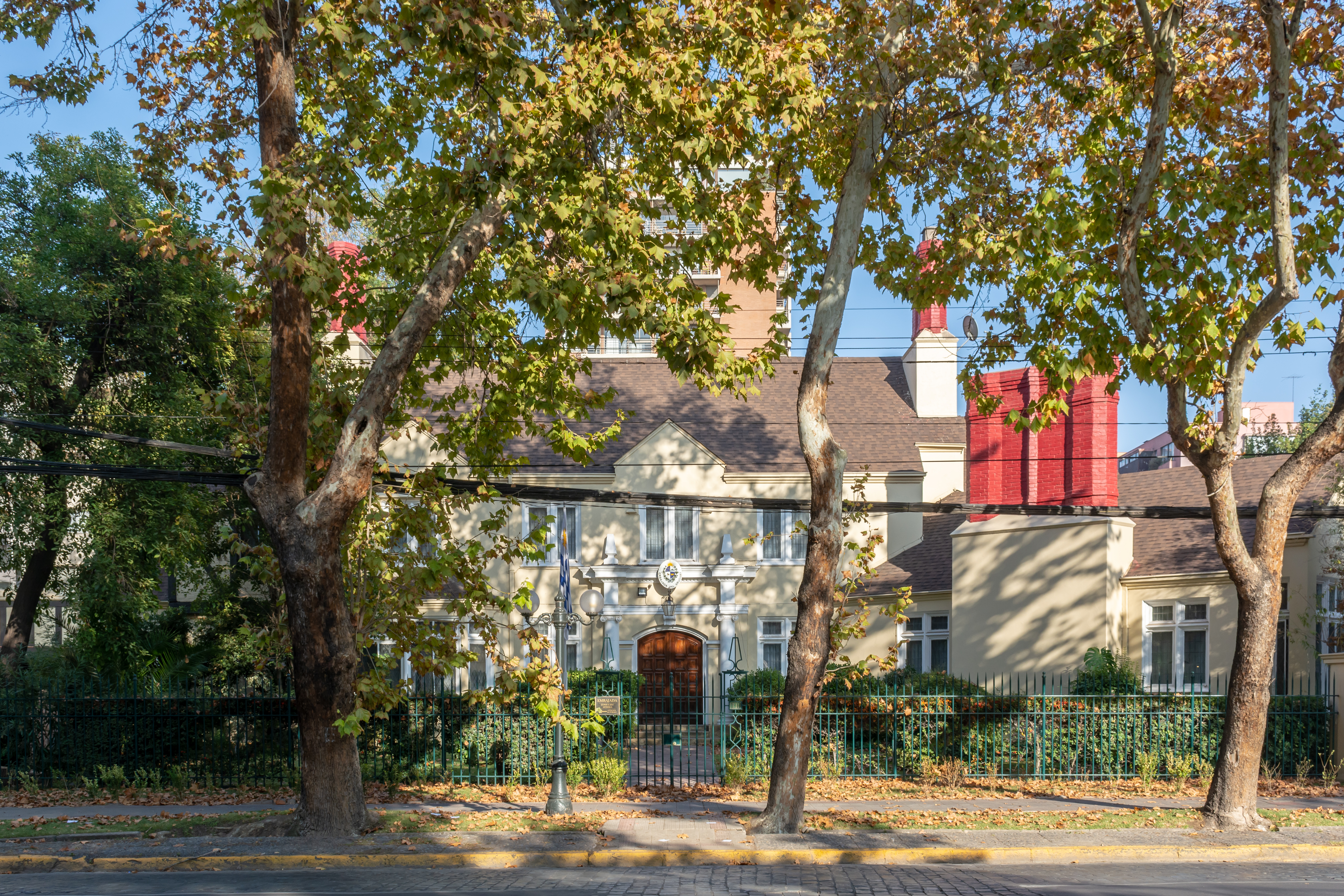
Embassy in Santiago de Chile

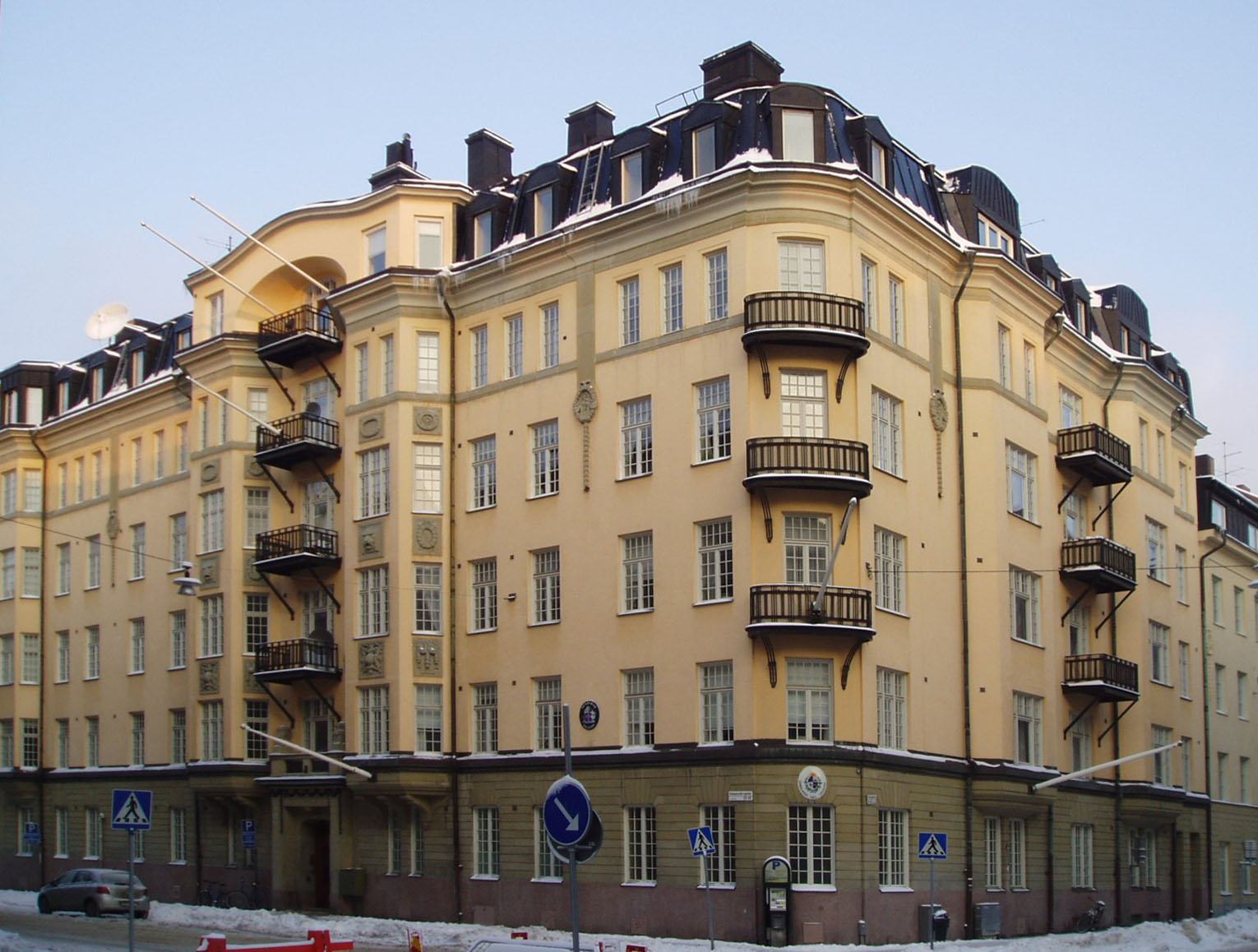
Building hosting the Embassy in Stockholm

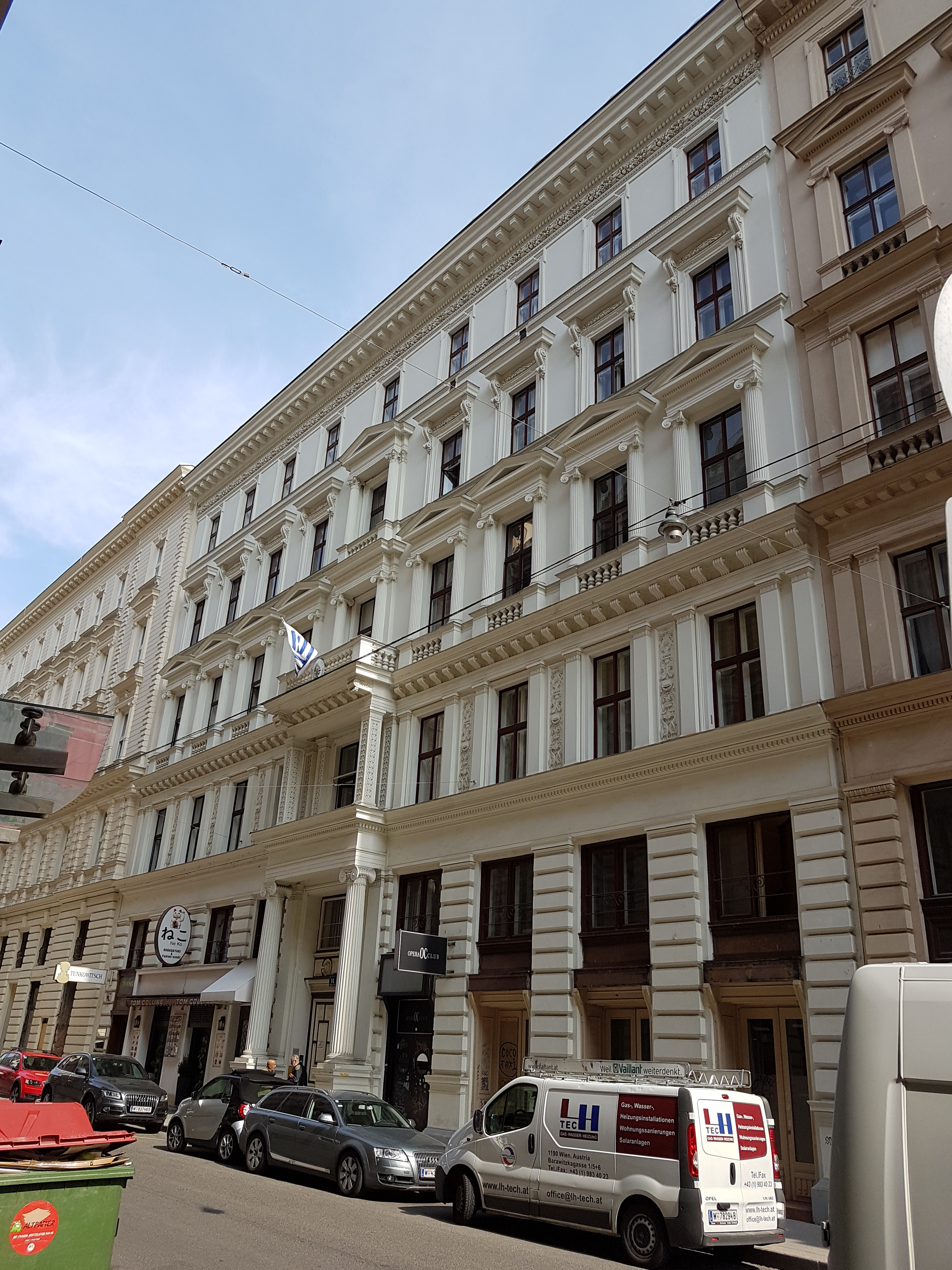
Building hosting the Embassy in Vienna

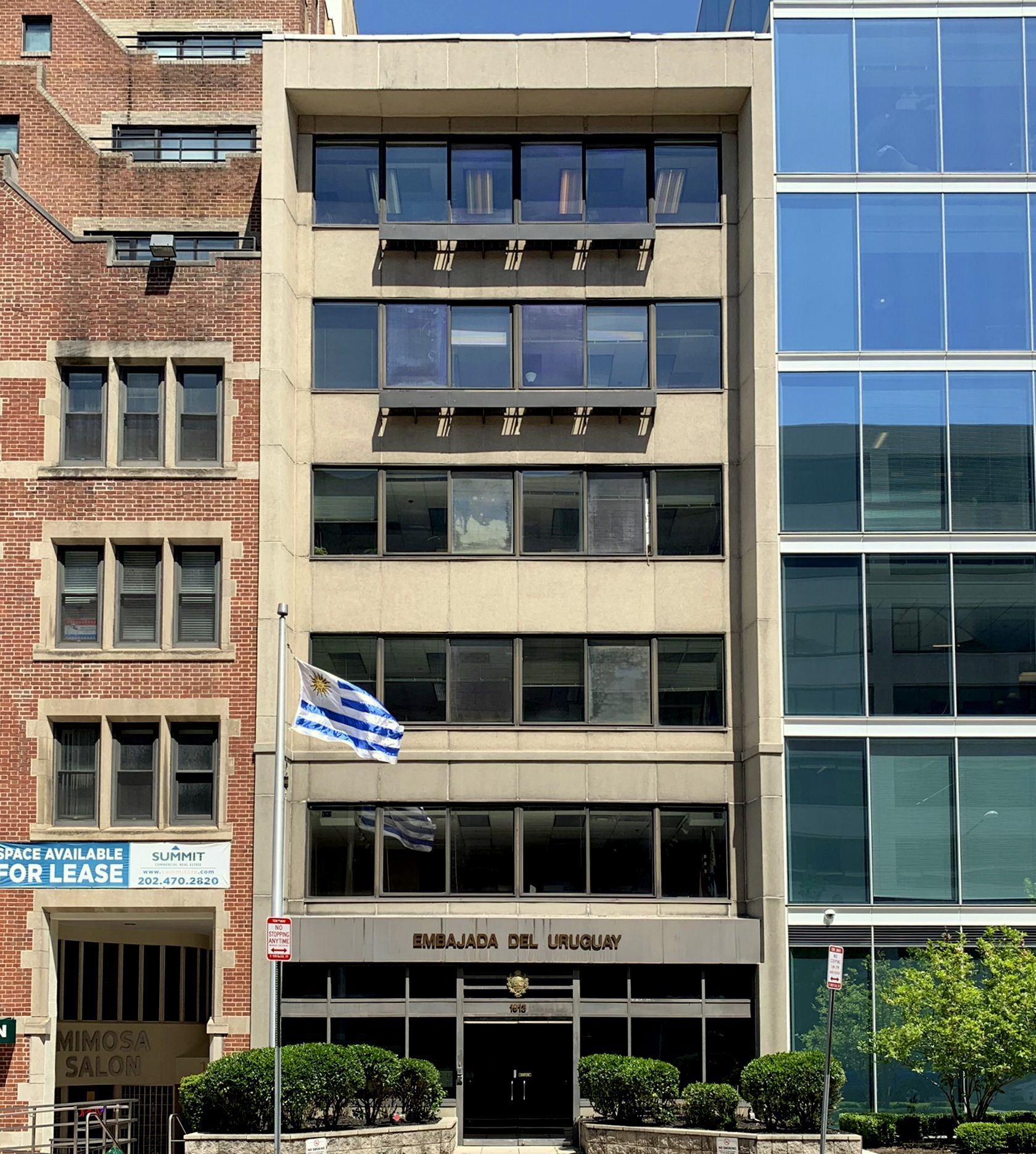
Embassy in Washington, D.C.

== Closed missions ==
=== Africa ===
| Host country | Host city | Mission | Year closed | Ref. |
|---|---|---|---|---|
| Algeria | Algiers | Embassy | 1993 | |
| Angola | Luanda | Embassy | 2021 | |
| Gabon | Libreville | Embassy | 1992 | |
| Ivory Coast | Abidjan | Embassy | 1989 | |
| Libya | Tripoli | Embassy | 2011 | |
| Morocco | Casablanca | Embassy | 1967 | |
| Nigeria | Lagos (Note: The embassy closed down prior to the relocation of the Nigerian capital from Lagos to Abuja in 1991.) | Embassy | 1985 | |
| South Africa | Cape Town | Consulate-General | 2007 | |

=== Americas ===
| Host country | Host city | Mission | Year closed | Ref. |
|---|---|---|---|---|
| Argentina | Paraná | Consulate-General | 2020 | |
| Brazil | Curitiba | Consulate-General | 2021 | |
| Brazil | Pelotas | Consulate-General | 2021 | |
| Brazil | Salvador | Consulate | 2021 | |
| Brazil | Uruguaiana | Consulate | 2002 | |
| Nicaragua | Managua | Embassy | 2021 | |
| United States | Chicago | Consulate-General | 2021 | |
| United States | Los Angeles | Consulate-General | 2021 | |
| Venezuela | Caracas | Embassy | 2024 | |

=== Europe ===
| Host country | Host city | Mission | Year closed | Ref. |
|---|---|---|---|---|
| Bulgaria | Sofia | Embassy | 2002 | |
| Czechia | Prague | Embassy | 2011 | |
| East Germany | East Berlin | Embassy | 1990 | |
| France | Marseille | Consulate-General | 1997 | |
| Hungary | Budapest | Embassy | 2002 | |
| Netherlands | Rotterdam | Consulate-General | 1997 | |
| Poland | Warsaw | Embassy | 2021 | |
| SFR Yugoslavia | Belgrade | Embassy | 1992 | |

=== Oceania ===
| Host country | Host city | Mission | Year closed | Ref. |
|---|---|---|---|---|
| New Zealand | Wellington | Embassy | 2000 | |

== See also ==
- Foreign relations of Uruguay
- Visa policy of Uruguay
