= Embassy of Uruguay, Berlin =

Chief diplomatic mission of Uruguay in Germany

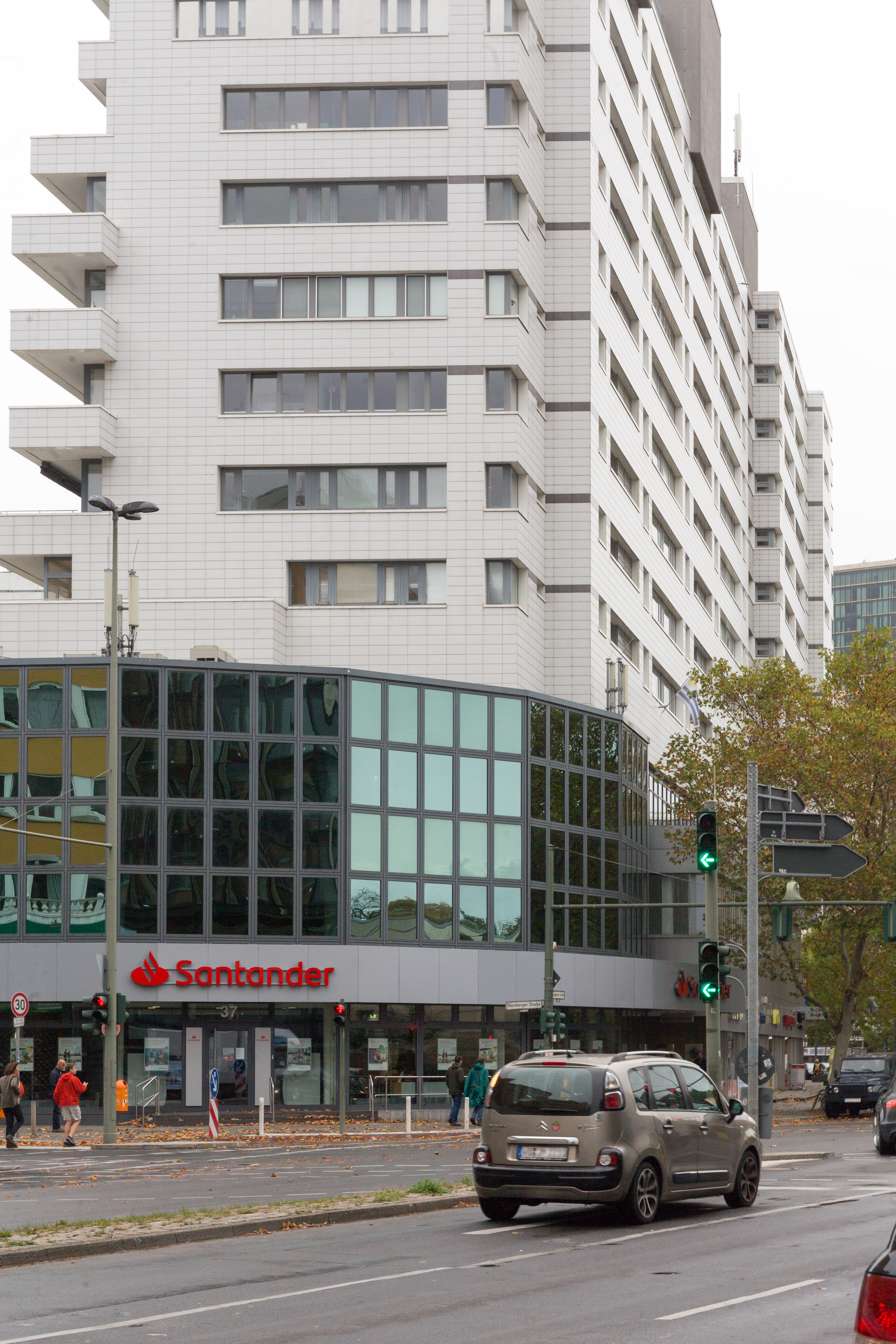
- Embassy building
- Location: Berlin, Germany
- Address: 39, Budapester Straße; Berlin
- Ambassador: Fernando Miguel López Fabregat

The Embassy of Uruguay in Berlin (German: Botschaft Uruguays in Berlin) is the chief diplomatic mission of Uruguay in the Federal Republic of Germany. It is located at 39 Budapester Straße in the Charlottenburg district of the Charlottenburg-Wilmersdorf borough.

== History ==
Uruguay and the West Germany established diplomatic relations on January 9, 1952. The embassy was located at 1-3 Gotenstrasse in Bad Godesberg, Bonn. Due to the move of the Bundestag and government to Berlin, the Uruguayan embassy also moved relocated to 39 Budapester Straße in January 2000.

On December 24, 1972, Uruguay and the East Germany established diplomatic relations and the Uruguayan embassy was located at 97 Clara-Zetkin-Straße 97 in East Berlin.

Currently, the Uruguayan embassy is located in the Eden House, a thirteen-story building residential and office building at Budapester Straße 39 in Charlottenburg, Berlin. Built from 1964 to 1966, it takes its name from the old Eden Hotel, which was destroyed in World War II.

== See also ==
- Germany–Uruguay relations
- German Uruguayans
