= France–Uruguay relations =

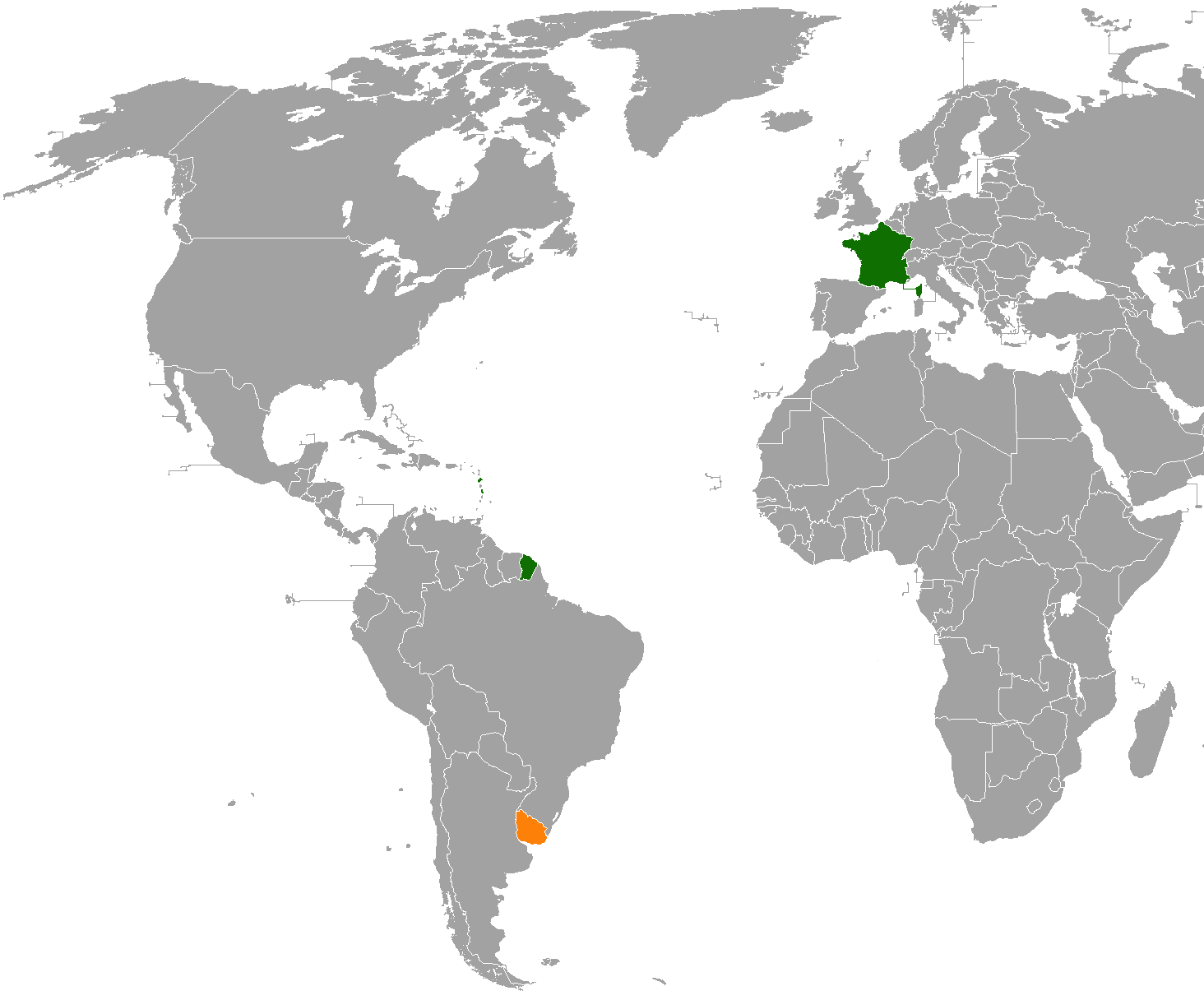
- France: Uruguay

France–Uruguay relations are the current and historical relations between the French Republic and the Oriental Republic of Uruguay. Both nations enjoy friendly relations, the importance of which centers on the history of French migration to Uruguay. In the late 19th century, one-third of Uruguay's population was of French descent. Both nations are members of the United Nations.

== History ==
In 1825, Uruguay obtained its independence after the Cisplatine War. Soon afterwards, both nations established diplomatic relations. In March 1838, France imposed a two-year blockade of Río de la Plata against Argentina during the War of the Confederation. In 1839, the Uruguayan Civil War commenced. From the beginning, France looked for allied forces to fight Buenos Aires Governor, Juan Manuel de Rosas, on their behalf. For this purpose the French supported Uruguayan President Fructuoso Rivera and helped him to defeat Constitutional President Manuel Oribe, who was on good terms with Governor Rosas. On 24 October 1838, Manuel Oribe resigned and fled to Buenos Aires, and Fructuoso Rivera assumed power. At the end of the 19th century, the French community represented about a third of Uruguay's population, most from the French Basque Country and Béarn Province.

In October 1964, French President Charles de Gaulle paid a visit to Uruguay, becoming the first French head-of-government to visit the South American Nation. During his visit, de Gaulle met with Uruguayan President Daniel Fernández Crespo.

In 1973, Uruguay entered into a civic-military dictatorship. As a result, political opponents were persecuted and many fled to exile, most to other Latin American nations. France hosted numerous Uruguayan exiles and suspended diplomatic relations during the military period. In 1985, diplomatic relations were restored between both nations with the fall of the Uruguayan dictatorship and the restoration of democracy.

Much of the Uruguayan State was inspired by the French model (Secularism, Napoleonic Code and educational system). In 2012, Uruguay became an Observer nation for the Organisation internationale de la Francophonie.

There have been numerous visits and reunions between leaders of both nations. In March 2016, French President François Hollande paid a visit to Uruguay and met with President Tabaré Vázquez. In December 2018, Uruguayan President Tabaré Vázquez paid a visit to France and met with President Emmanuel Macron.

== High-level visits ==
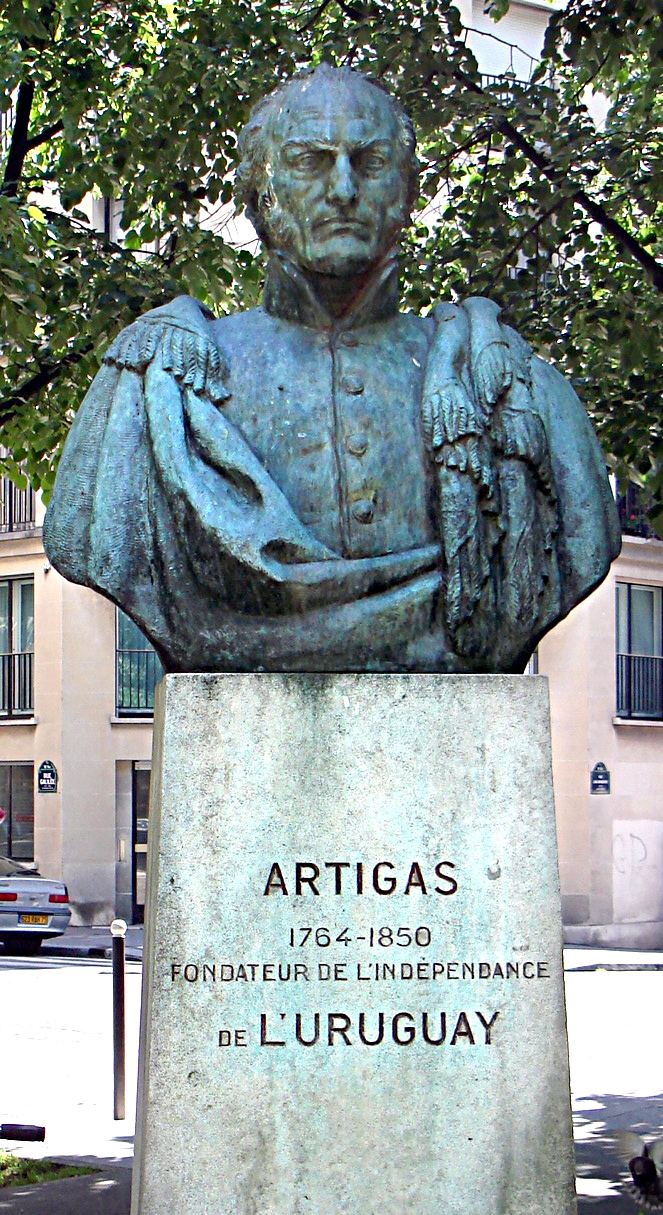
Bust of Uruguayan Independence Hero, José Gervasio Artigas, in Paris.

High-level visits from France to Uruguay

- President Charles de Gaulle (1964)
- Secretary of State for French Abroad Édouard Courtial (2011)
- Minister Delegate for La Francophonie Yamina Benguigui (2013)
- President François Hollande (2016)
- Special Envoy Jean-Pierre Bel (2018)

High-level visits from Uruguay to France

- Minister of the Economy Álvaro García Rodríguez (2010)
- Minister of Education and Culture Ricardo Ehrlich (2012, 2013, 2014)
- Foreign Minister Luis Almagro (2014)
- President Tabaré Vázquez (2015, 2018)

== Bilateral agreements ==
Both nations have signed several agreements such as an Agreement of Cooperation in a scholarship program for master's and doctorate degrees for Uruguayan students to study in France (2018); Agreement for the mutual recognition of university degrees (2018); Agreement for Environment Cooperation (2018); Agreement of Cooperation on the teaching of the French language in Uruguay (2018); Agreement for Defense Cooperation (2018); Agreement for Scientific and Academic Cooperation (2018); and an Agreement of Cooperation in research and public teaching.

== Trade ==
In 2017, two-way trade between both nations totaled €276 million Euros. France's main exports to Uruguay include: perfumes and cosmetics; vehicles and auto accessories; mechanical equipment and industrial machinery. Uruguay's main exports to France includes: pulp purchases and beef. Uruguay ranks as France's 8th largest trading partner in Latin America. France is also one of Uruguay's main investors. Over sixty French companies operate in Uruguay and are responsible for approximately 8,000 jobs. In 2011, French global automotive supplier, Faurecia, opened a factory in Uruguay.

== Resident diplomatic missions ==
- France has an embassy in Montevideo.
- Uruguay has an embassy in Paris.
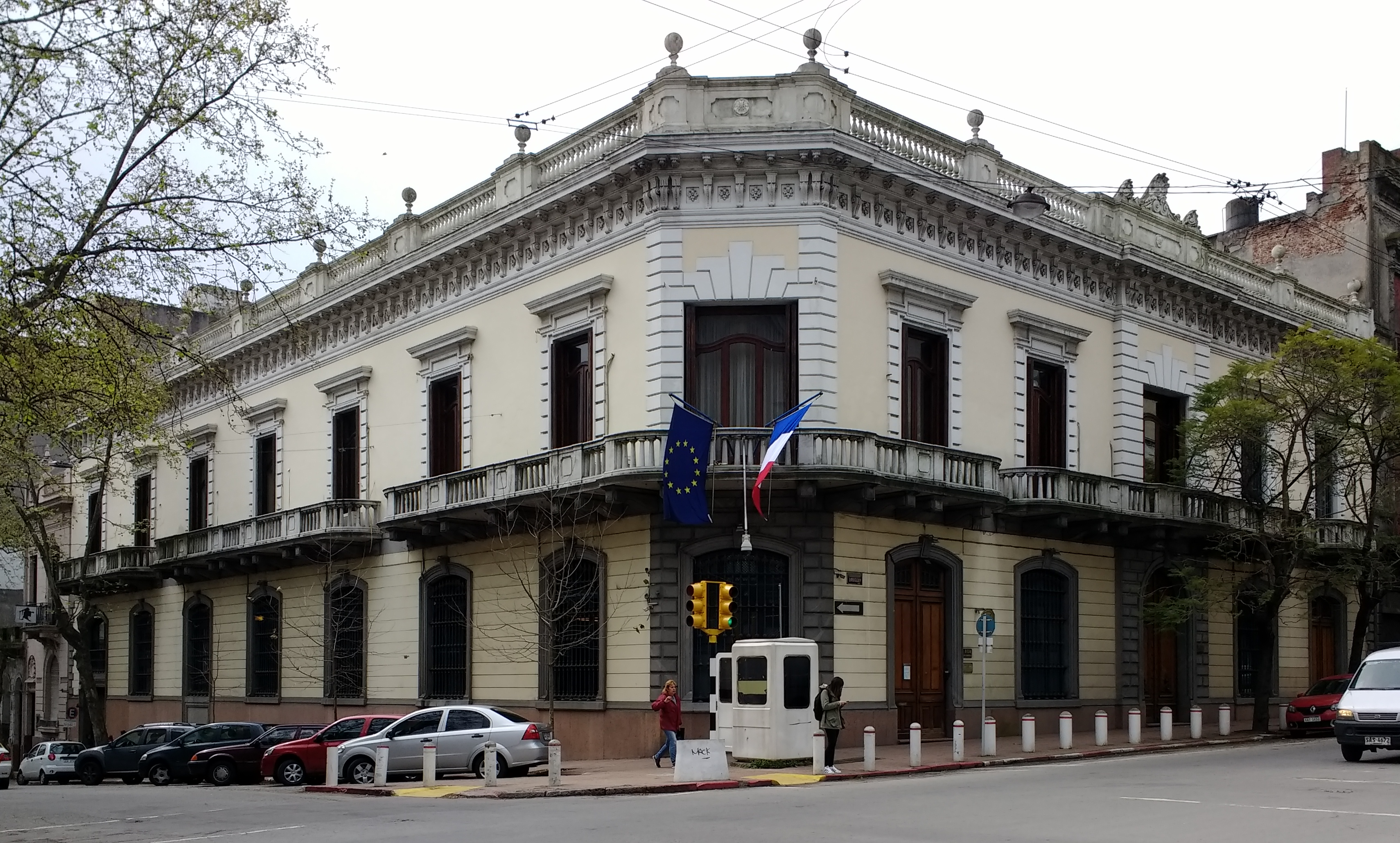
Embassy of France in Montevideo

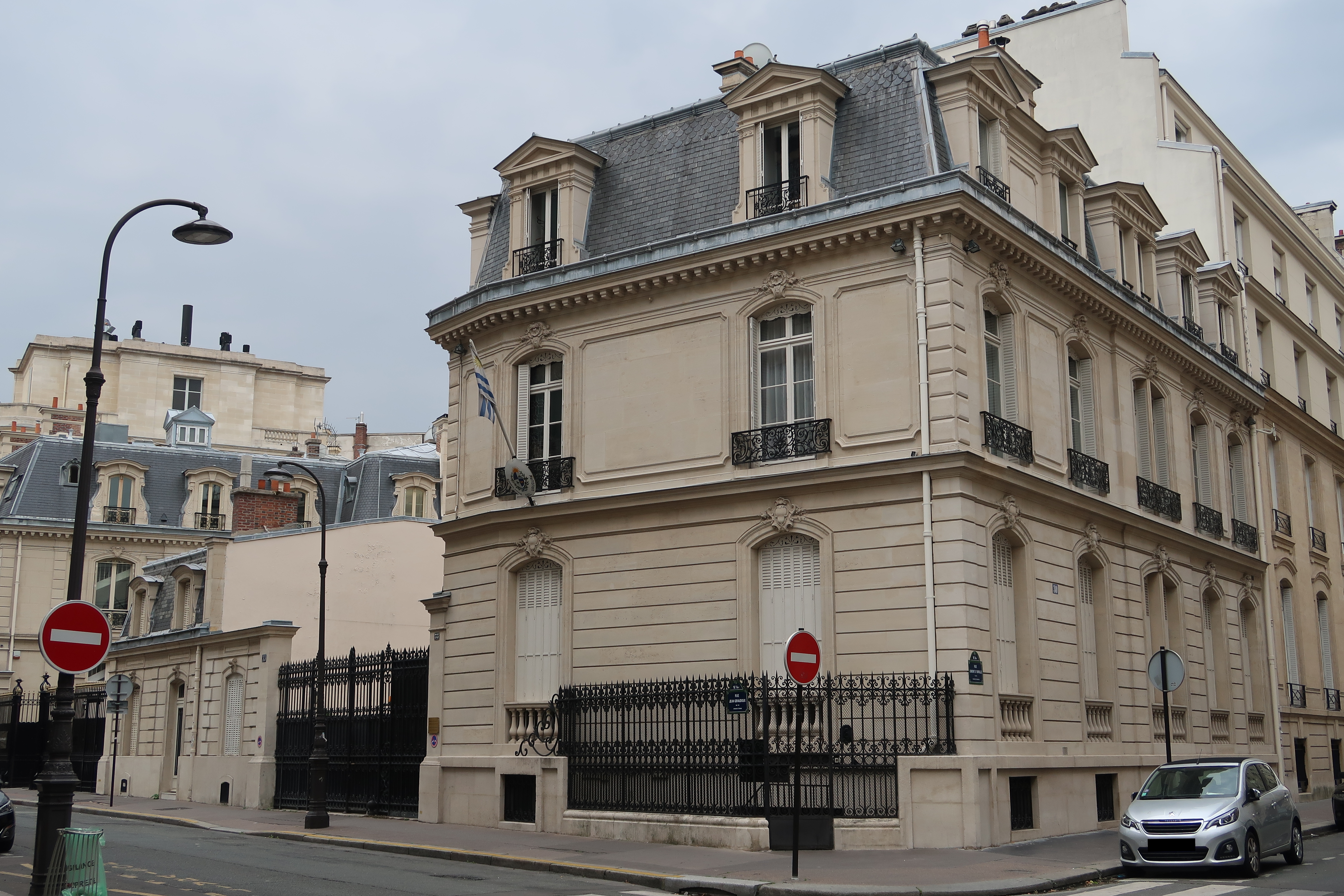
Embassy of Uruguay in Paris

== See also ==
- French Uruguayans
- Lycée Français de Montevideo
- Uruguayans in France
