= Embassy of Uruguay, Paris =

Chief diplomatic mission of Uruguay in France

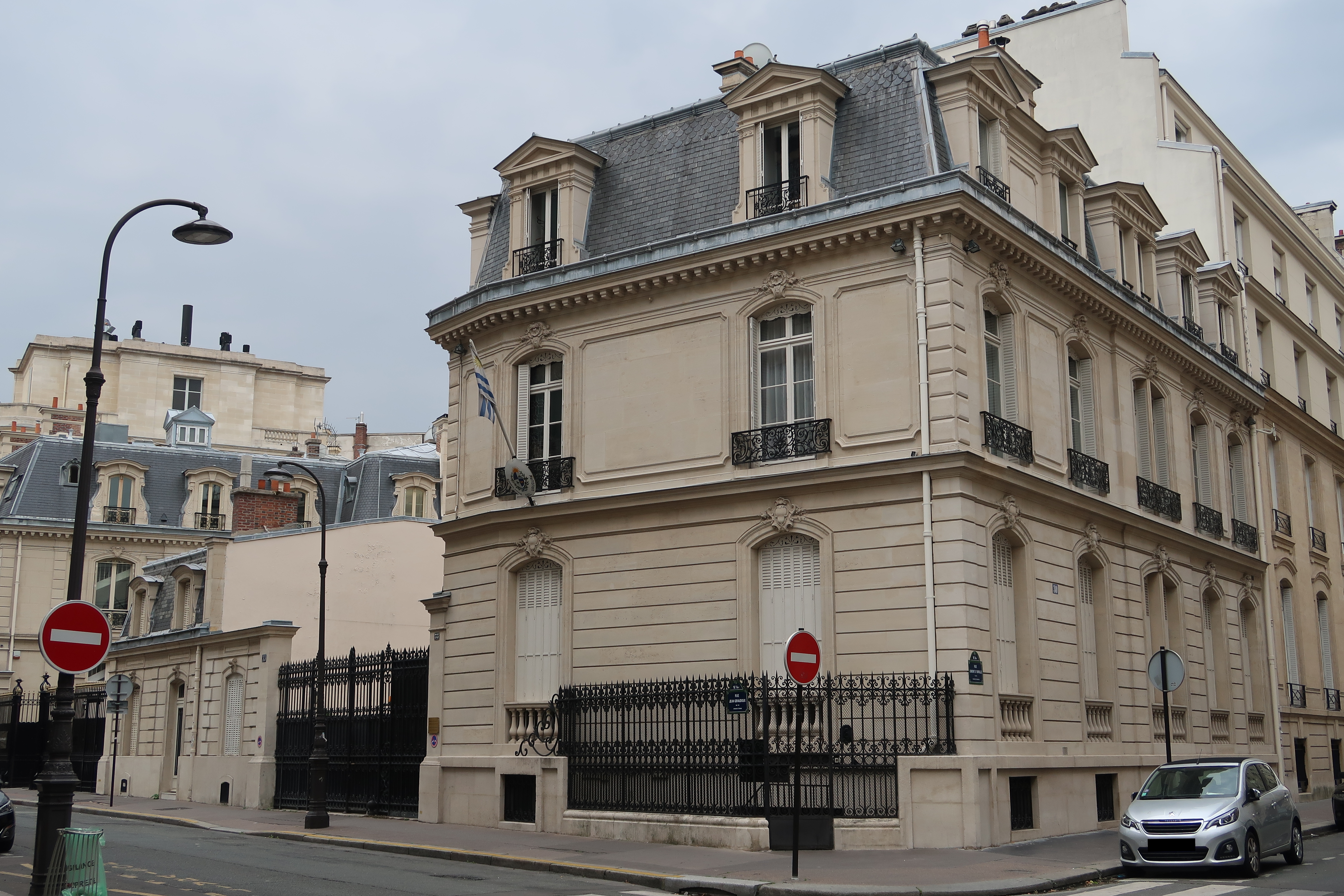
- Embassy building
- Location: Paris, France
- Address: 33, rue Jean-Giraudoux; Paris 75116
- Ambassador: Enrique Loedel

The Embassy of Uruguay in Paris is the chief diplomatic mission of Uruguay in the French Republic. It is located at 33 rue Jean-Giraudoux. It also serves as the headquarters of the Consulate-General.

== History ==
In the 1900s, the chancellery of the Uruguay legation was located at 1 bis rue d'Offémont in the 17th arrondissement. However, in the 1920s, the mission was located at 78 Avenue Kléber (16th arrondissement), while the consulate-general was located at 20 Boulevard Saint-Germain (5th arrondissement).

== See also ==
- France–Uruguay relations
- List of diplomatic missions of Uruguay
