= Germany–Uruguay relations =

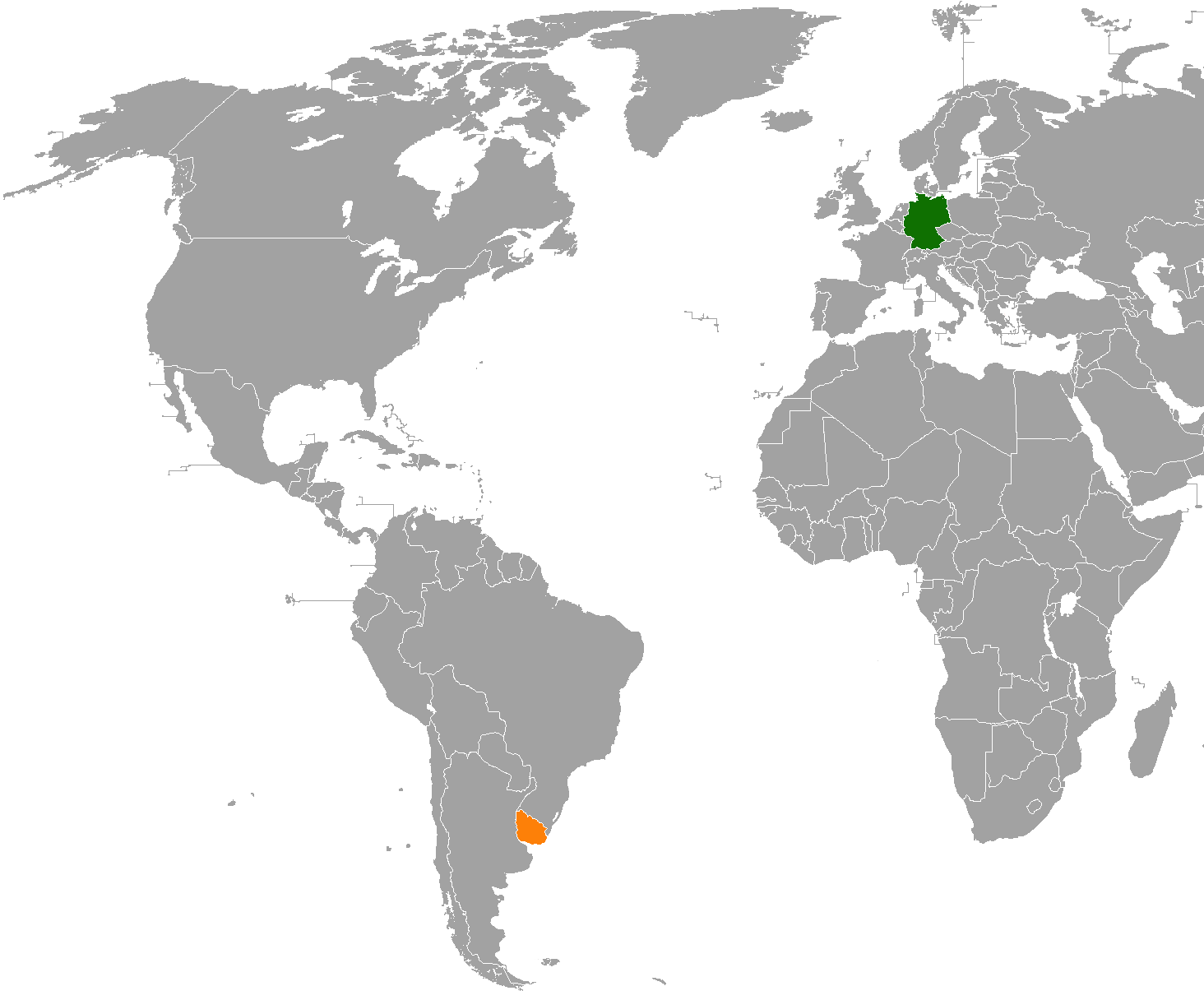

- Germany: Uruguay

Germany–Uruguay relations are the bilateral relations between Germany and Uruguay. Germany has an embassy in Montevideo. Uruguay has an embassy in Berlin, a consulate-general in Hamburg. Germany is Uruguay's principal trading partner in the European Union.

== History ==
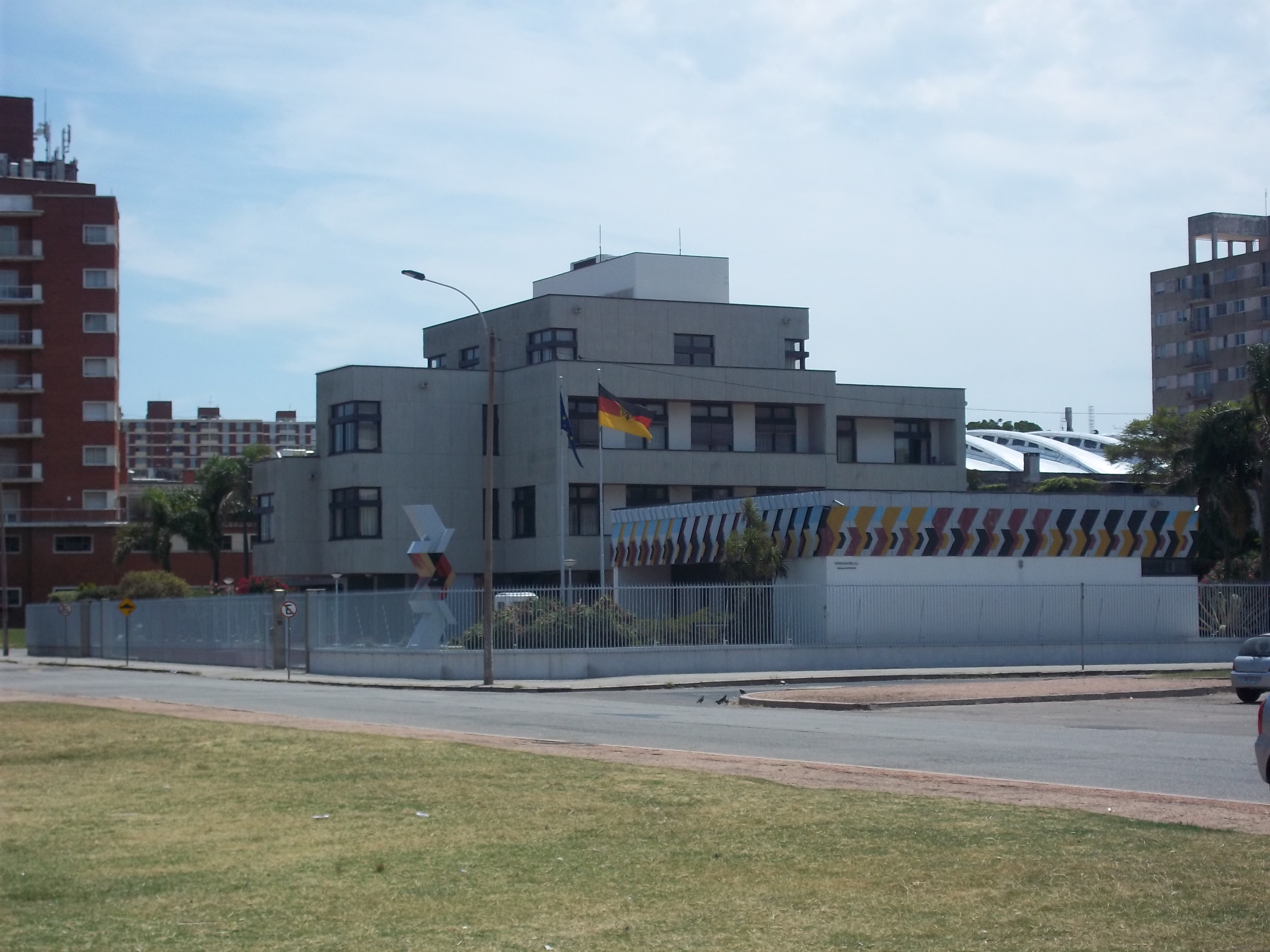
Embassy of Germany in Montevideo

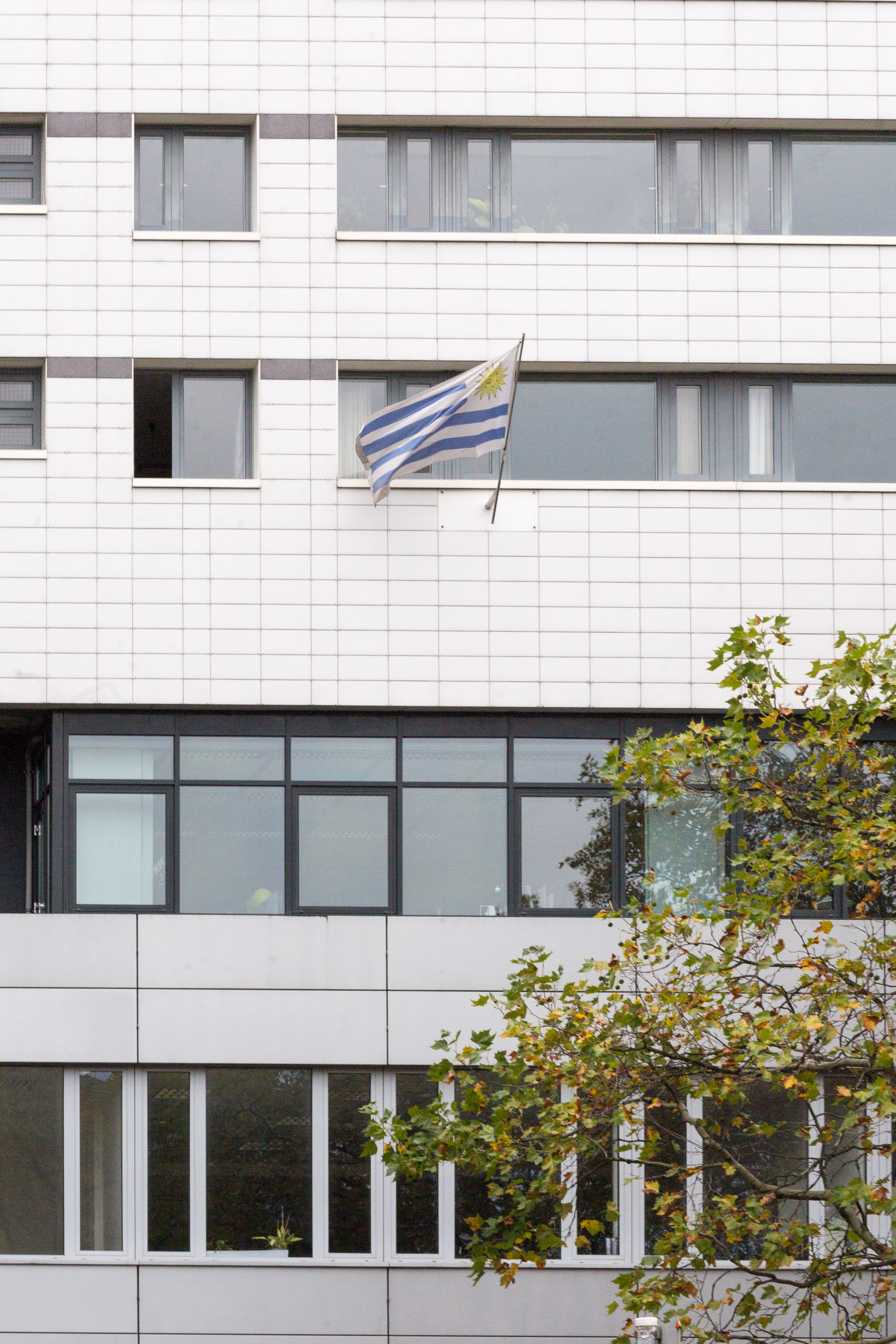
Embassy of Uruguay in Berlin

Starting in the 1850s German immigrants have made an important contribution to the development of Uruguay.

During World War I, Uruguay sided against Germany and broke off diplomatic relations.

Uruguay offered asylum to German Jews starting in 1935.

On December 13, 1939, the Battle of the River Plate took place off the coast of Uruguay where British forces sunk the German Graf Spee. There was a diplomatic battle with Dr. Alberto Guani as Uruguayan Foreign Minister that ruled a 72-hour timeline for the ship to remain in Montevideo harbour. Most of the Graf Spee's surviving crew of 1,150 were interned in Uruguay and Argentina and many remained after the war. A German Embassy official in Uruguay said his government has sent an official letter stating its position as to whether Germany claims ownership of the vessel. The German claim would be invalid because early in 1940 the Nazi government sold salvaging rights to the vessel to a Uruguayan businessman who was acting on behalf of the British government. However, any salvaging rights would have expired under Uruguayan law.

By 1940, Germany had threatened to break of diplomatic relations with Uruguay. Nazi Germany protested that Uruguay gave safe harbor to the MV Carnarvon Castle after it was attacked by a Nazi raider. The ship was repaired with steel plate reportedly salvaged from the Graf Spee. On January 25, 1942, Uruguay broke diplomatic relations with Nazi Germany.

Mennonite communities emigrated from Germany to Uruguay after World War II, starting in 1948. After World War II, Uruguay established diplomatic relations with both the Federal Republic of Germany and the German Democratic Republic.

In October 2011, Uruguayan President José Mujica paid an official visit to Germany.

== Cultural ==
There is a Goethe Institute in Uruguay. The German School of Montevideo, is a German binational school that opened in 1857. It was the first German School to open in South America. There is a joint Uruguay Germany university-entrance examination which qualifies takers for university in both countries. A German-language school is run by the Mennonites. A cultural cooperation accord was signed on 8 May 1989.

== Trade ==
Exports to Germany from Uruguay were worth EUR 205 million and Uruguayan imports from Germany were EUR 133 million in 2009. Germany is the country's principal trading partner in the European Union. Germany is fifth overall among export countries to Uruguay, after Brazil, the US, Argentina and Mexico. Germany is seventh on the list of import countries, after Brazil, Argentina, the US, China, Venezuela and Russia. Uruguay is 84th among suppliers of German imports and 108th among buyers of German exports.

== Political foundations ==
The Friedrich Ebert Foundation and the Konrad Adenauer Foundation have representation in Montevideo. Other German foundations include the Friedrich Naumann Foundation, Heinrich Böll Foundation and the Rosa Luxemburg Foundation.

== Resident diplomatic missions ==
- Germany has an embassy in Montevideo.
- Uruguay has an embassy in Berlin and a consulate-general in Hamburg.

== See also ==
- Foreign relations of Germany
- Foreign relations of Uruguay
- German Uruguayan
