= German Uruguayans =

Ethnic group

Alemanes Uruguayos; Deutsche Uruguayaner
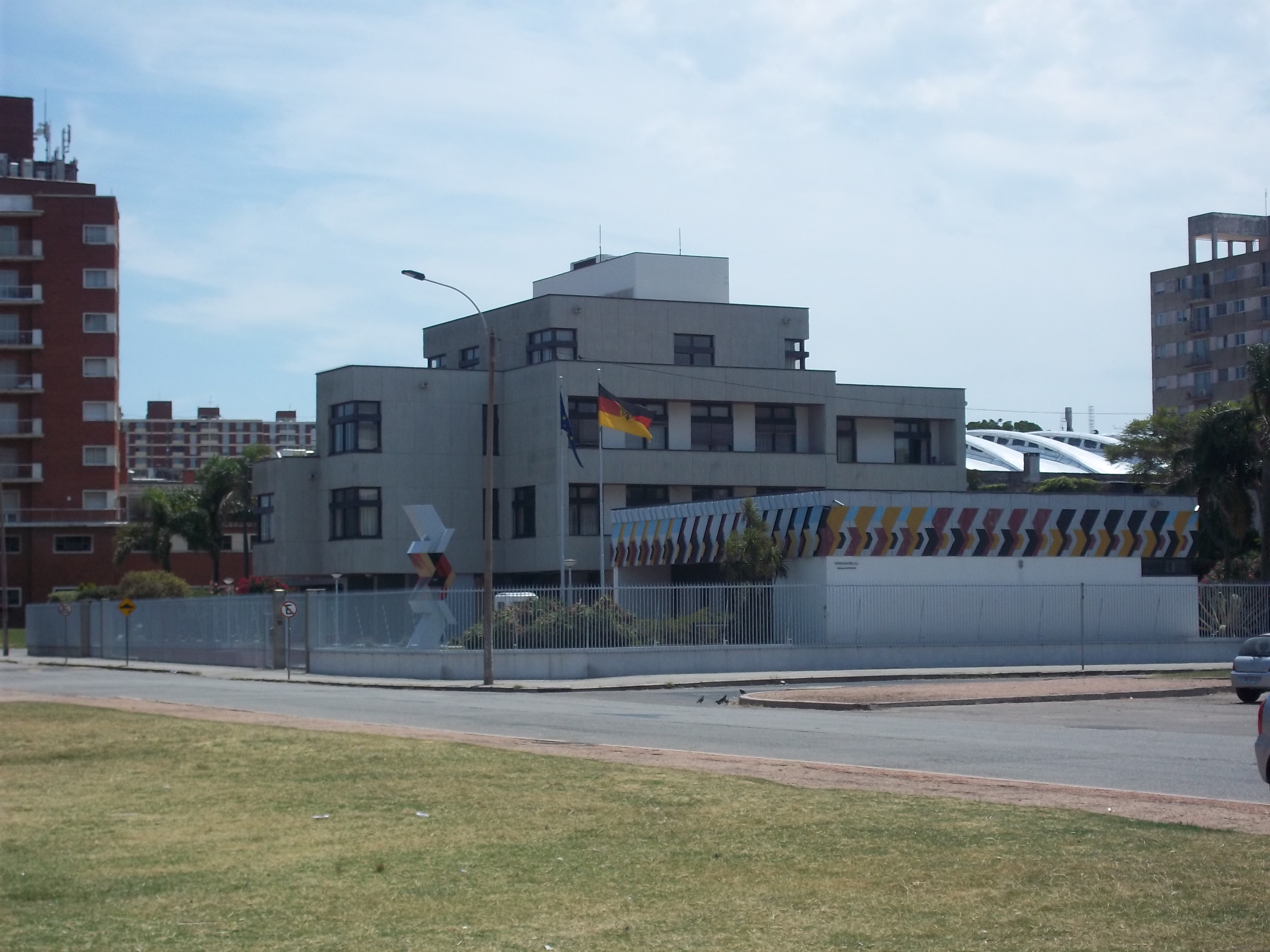
- The German embassy in Uruguay

Total population
- 40,000 German descendants

Regions with significant populations
- Mainly found in the capital, Montevideo. Other numbers are found throughout the country.

Languages
- Rioplatense Spanish, German, Hunsrik

Religion
- Christianity and Judaism

Related ethnic groups
- German Argentines, German Brazilians, German Chileans, Italian Uruguayans

The German Uruguayans in Uruguay numbers ca. 10,000 German expatriates and 40,000 people of German descent. Most of them live in the Montevideo area, although there are German minorities in Paysandú, Río Negro, San José and Canelones.

== History ==
One of the first Germans to come to the region was Ulrich Schmidl (known locally as Ulrico Smidel), who arrived at the oriental shores of the River Plate in the early 16th century and described the Charrúas.

The 2011 Uruguayan census revealed 1,167 people who declared Germany as their country of birth.

== Religion ==
Local Germans practise different Christian religions:

- Roman Catholic: the Pallottine Fathers, with presence at the Church of Our Lady of Lourdes.
- Evangelical Church: with its own temple at Juan Manuel Blanes 1116 in Montevideo.
- Mennonite: there are four Mennonite settlements - Colonia Nicolich, El Ombú, Gartental, and Colonia Delta.

There is also an important presence of German Jews, with religious activities at the NCI Synagogue.

== Institutions ==
German immigrants established several institutions of their own, among others:

- German School Montevideo (German: Deutsche Schule Montevideo, established 1857)
- German Evangelical Community (German: Deutsch-Evangelische Gemeinde Montevideo)
- German Cultural and Social Work (German: Deutsches Kultur- und Hilfswerk)
- German Club (German: Deutscher Klub, established 1866)
- Uruguayan-German Chamber of Commerce and Industry (German: Deutsch-Uruguayische Industrie- und Handelskammer, established 1916)
- German Rowing Club Montevideo (German: Deutscher Ruderverein Montevideo, established 1922)
- German Male Choir (German: Deutscher Männerchor)
- Alpine Club Montevideo (German: Alpenländer Verein Montevideo, established 1934)
- Bertolt Brecht House (German: Bertolt-Brecht-Haus, established 1964)
- German-Uruguayan Cultural Association (German: Deutsch-Uruguayische Kulturvereinigung)
- German Cultural Association Paysandú (German: Deutsche Kulturvereinigung Paysandú)
- German-Uruguayan Friendship Circle

There are also local offices of German institutions:

- Friedrich Ebert Foundation in Uruguay
- Konrad Adenauer Foundation in Uruguay
- The Goethe-Institut offers courses on German language and culture.

Historic German schools:

- Deutsche Schule El-Ombu
- Deutsche Schule Gartental
- Deutsche Schule Delta (La Boyado)
- Deutsche Schule Paysandú

== Notable people ==
=== Arts and entertainment ===
- Erika Büsch, musician
- Luis Camnitzer, artist
- Jorge Drexler, musician and doctor
- Enrique Graf, pianist
- Carlos Grethe, painter and academician
- Andrés Neumann, cultural entrepreneur
- Carlos Ott, architect
- Carlos Rehermann, novelist and playwright
- Erwin Schrott, opera singer
- Carla Witte, painter
- Patricia Wolf, model and television personality
- Paula Einöder, poet and writer

=== Politics ===
- Pedro Carve (Colorado; President of the Chamber of Deputies, 1876)
- Carlos Fischer (Colorado; President of the National Council of Government, 1958–1959)
- Héctor Grauert (Colorado; representative, minister, and member of the NCG)
- Julio César Grauert (Colorado hero, opposed the Dictatorship of Terra)
- Tabaré Hackenbruch (Colorado, three-term mayor of Canelones Department)
- Alberto Heber (Blanco; President of the National Council of Government, 1966–1967)
- Mario Heber (Blanco; representative and senator)
- Luis Alberto Heber (Blanco; senator, later minister in the cabinet of Luis Lacalle Pou)
- Roberto Kreimerman (Frente Amplio; minister in the cabinet of José Mujica)
- Andrés Ojeda Spitz (Colorado; presidential candidate, later senator)

=== Sports ===
- Nicole Frank, swimmer
- Carlos Grossmüller, footballer
- Gary Kagelmacher, footballer
- Dominique Knüppel, Olympic sailor
- Nicolás Klappenbach, rugby union player
- Martín Kutscher, swimmer
- Sergio Orteman, footballer
- Gerardo Vonder Pütten, footballer

=== Scientists ===
- Daniel Altschuler, physician
- Elio García-Austt, neuroscientist
- Mariana Meerhoff, biologist
- Cornelius Osten, botanist
- Bernardo Rosengurtt, botanist and agrostologist
- Lucía Spangenberg, bioinformatician researcher at the Pasteur Institute of Montevideo

=== Other professions ===
- Otto Langmann, pastor
- Siegbert Rippe, commercial jurist
- Ernesto Schmitt, entrepreneur
- Rodolfo Wirz, Roman Catholic bishop of Maldonado and Punta del Este

== See also ==
- German people
- German diaspora
- German Argentine
- Germany-Uruguay relations
- Austrians in Uruguay
- Mennonites in Uruguay
- Swiss Uruguayans
