= Grauert =

Grauert is a surname. Notable people with the surname include:

- Hans Grauert (1930–2011), German mathematician
- Héctor Grauert (1907–1991), Uruguayan lawyer and politician
- Julio César Grauert (1902–1933), Uruguayan journalist and politician
- Ulrich Grauert (1889–1941), German Luftwaffe general
