= Switzerland–Uruguay relations =

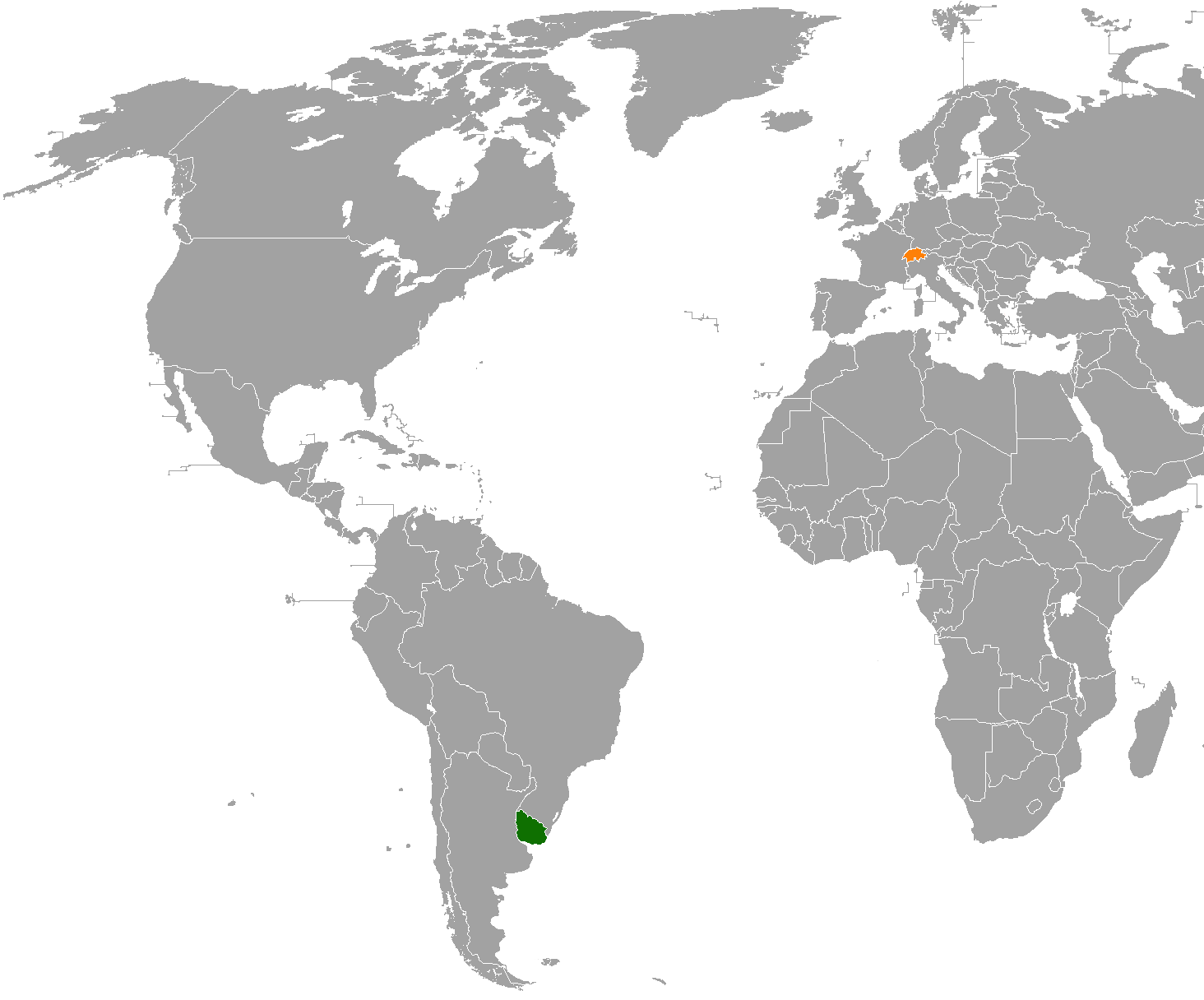
- Uruguay: Switzerland

Switzerland–Uruguay relations are foreign relations between Uruguay and Switzerland. Both countries share a long history of mutual economic relations, and they established diplomatic relations in 1828. Uruguay became a popular destination for Swiss migrants starting in the 1860s. In the 20th century, Uruguay has looked to Switzerland as a model for government, historical and cultural ties go back to at least the 19th century. There were 956 people with Swiss passports residing in Uruguay in 2008. Uruguay was described as the "Switzerland of the Americas" in a 1951 New York Times article for its popularity as a haven for capital fleeing Europe at the time and its adoption of Swiss-inspired banking laws. Thomas J. Knight also wrote that "Uruguay has for most of its history been the 'Switzerland' of South America."

== History ==
In 1860 the Basel bank of Siegrist und Fender purchased farm land in Uruguay. It was not long before the first Swiss citizens moved to Uruguay with the goal of working the land as farmers where they founded the colony of Nueva Helvecia around 1862. In 1931, Uruguay called for a Swiss style parliamentary system.

During both World Wars, Switzerland acted as an intermediary between Uruguay and Germany. Near the end of World War I, in 1918 and following an incident where a German submarine captured a delegation sent by Uruguay to France, "Uruguay caused Germany to be asked through Switzerland, whether Germany understood a state of war to exist between the two countries." Again, during World War II, Switzerland, as protecting power, represented Uruguay in Germany, Italy, Hungary and France.

A Swiss Chamber of Commerce has been in Uruguay since 1944. After the Korean War, Uruguay adopted Swiss style banking laws and became the "Switzerland of the Americas".

Swiss exports to Uruguay in 2008 were CHF 127.6 million, and Swiss imports in 2008 were CHF 66 million.

== Embassies and consulates ==
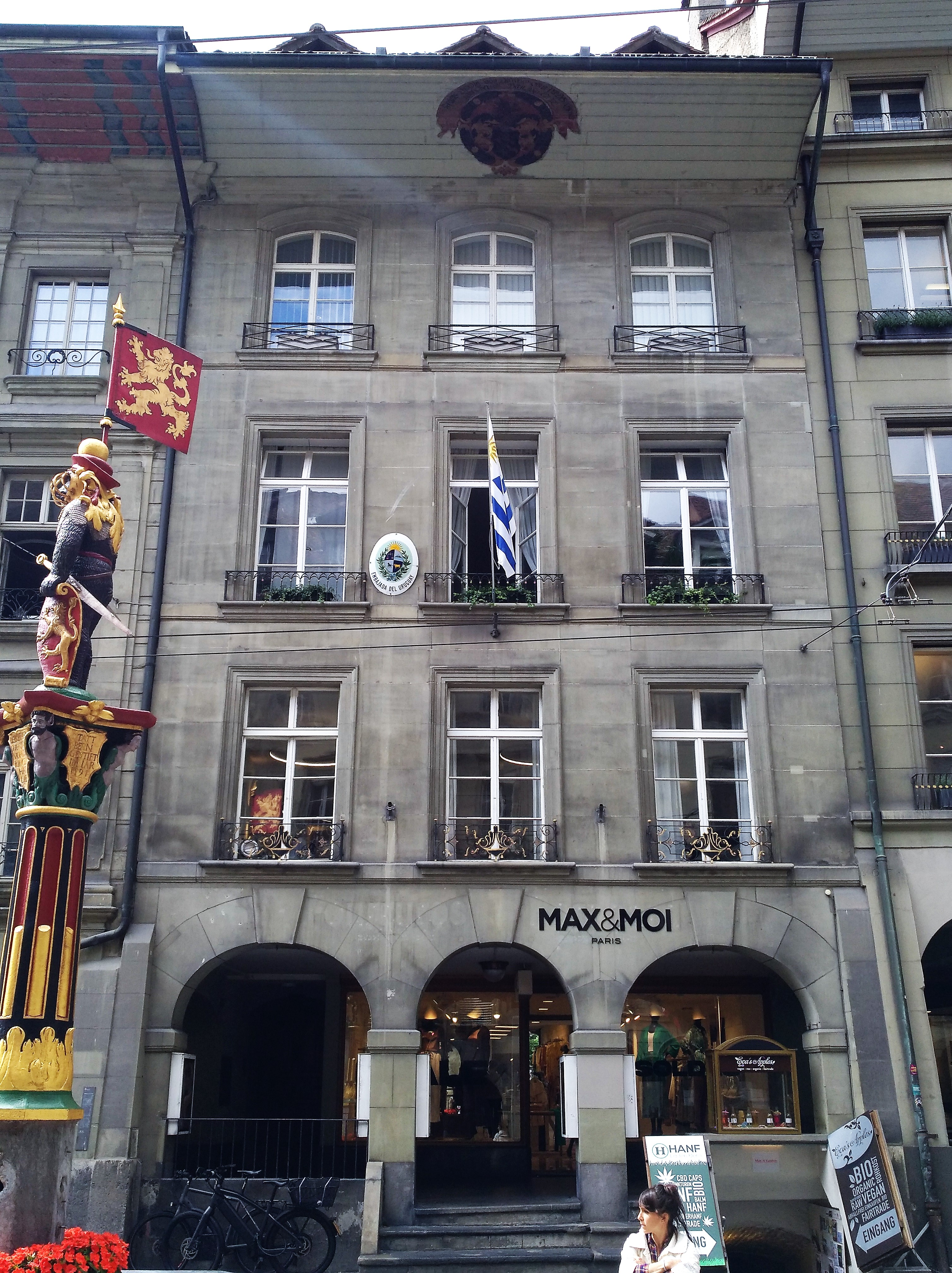
Embassy of Uruguay on Kramgasse in Bern.

Uruguay has an embassy in Bern, a general consulate in Geneva and an honorary consulate in Basel. Since 1947, Switzerland has a diplomatic representation in Montevideo.

Swiss representations in Montevideo:

- 1859 vice-consulate
- 1864 consulate
- 1921 general consulate
- 1947 legation
- 1963 embassy

== Population ==
Uruguayan nationals resident in Switzerland. This does not include dual citizens.

Year	Population
1995	688
2000	563
2005	491
2007	478

== Bilateral agreements ==
- Extradition treaty of 27 February 1923
- Trade agreement of 4 March 1938
- Air transport agreement of 16 September 1960
- Investment promotion and protection agreement of 7 October 1988, entry into force 22 April 1991

== See also ==
- Swiss Uruguayans
