= Nueva Helvecia =

- City
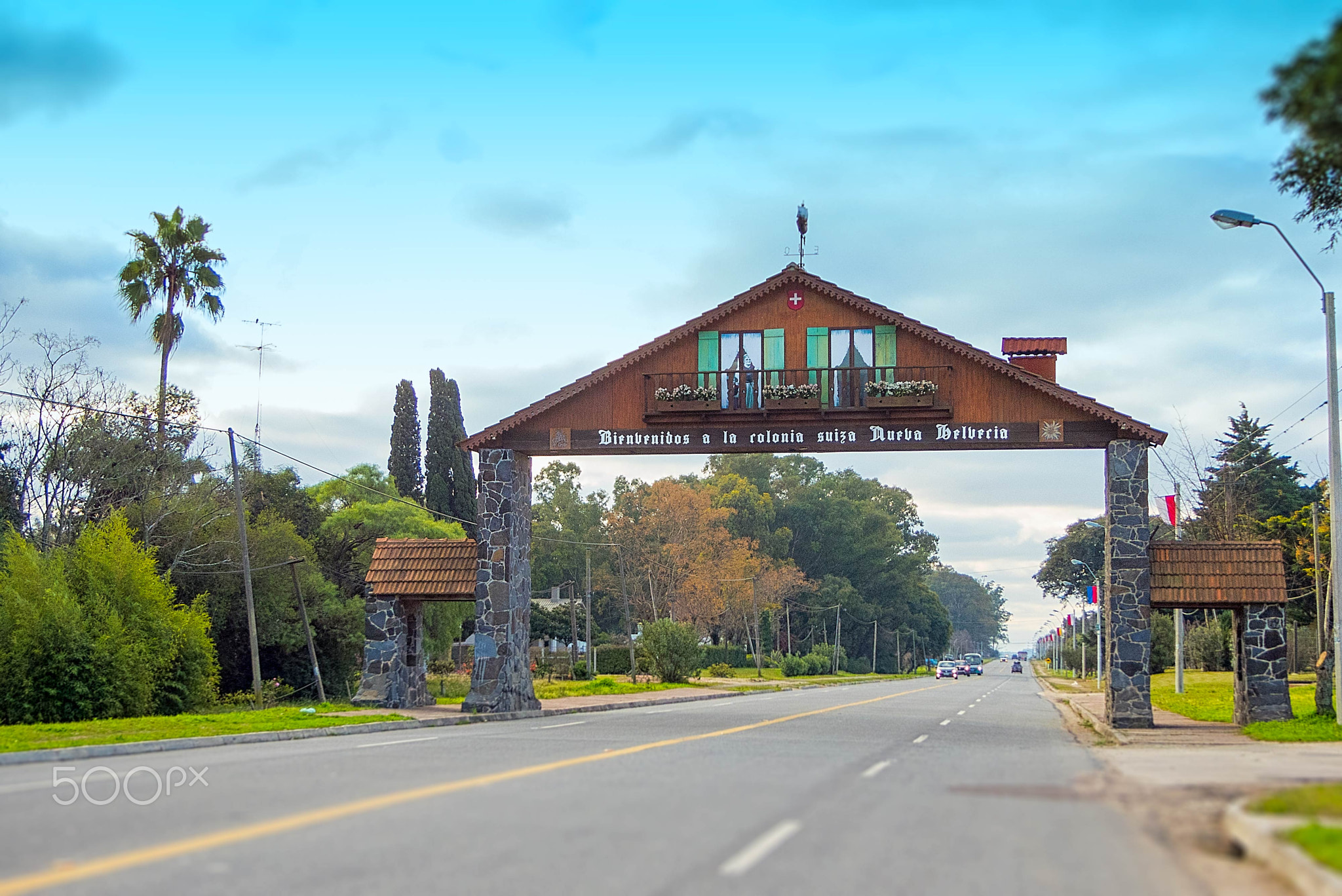
- Entrance to Nueva Helvecia

- Location within Uruguay
- Coordinates: 34°17′S 57°12′W
- Country: Uruguay
- Department: Colonia
- Founded: 1862

Population (2011 Census)
  - Total: 10,630

Nueva Helvecia (Spanish for "New Helvetia"; formerly known as Colonia Suiza) is a city in Colonia Department of Uruguay.

It is 120 kilometres (75 mi) west of Montevideo, the capital and largest city of Uruguay, and a few kilometres from the coast where the Atlantic Ocean meets the Río de la Plata. It is known nationwide for its Swiss heritage, stemming from its foundation by Swiss immigrants in the 1860s, as well as for its preserved Swiss-style architecture and cultural traditions.

== History ==
=== Settlement ===
In the 1850s, following the Uruguayan Civil War, the land on which Nueva Helvecia lies was among those designated for exploitation. As part of a broader process of rural settlement in the department of Colonia, which also included the colonies of Colonia Valdense and La Paz, the entrepreneur Doroteo García, who was engaged in promoting land settlement in the department of Colonia, acted as an intermediary between the Uruguayan government and the Basel-based financial institution Siegrist & Fender to establish an agricultural colony in the area.

Driven by economic hardship, rural overpopulation, and the social and economic transformations associated with the Industrial Revolution, Central European immigrants settled in Uruguay, a phenomenon framed within the historical period known as the “Great Transatlantic Migration”, which reached Uruguay from the 1860s onward. The first migratory waves arrived in the area in late 1861, composed mainly of Swiss immigrants, together with smaller numbers of French, Austrian, and German settlers.

On 25 April 1862, the largest number of immigrants arrived in the area, a date traditionally regarded as the foundation of the “Swiss Colony” (Colonia Suiza). The colony organized its political life along the lines of the Swiss Landsgemeinde and, under an agreement with the Uruguayan government, enjoyed a degree of autonomy during its first decade. In 1875, amid broader national political instability, secret balloting was introduced as a mechanism for resolving internal affairs.

=== Early years ===
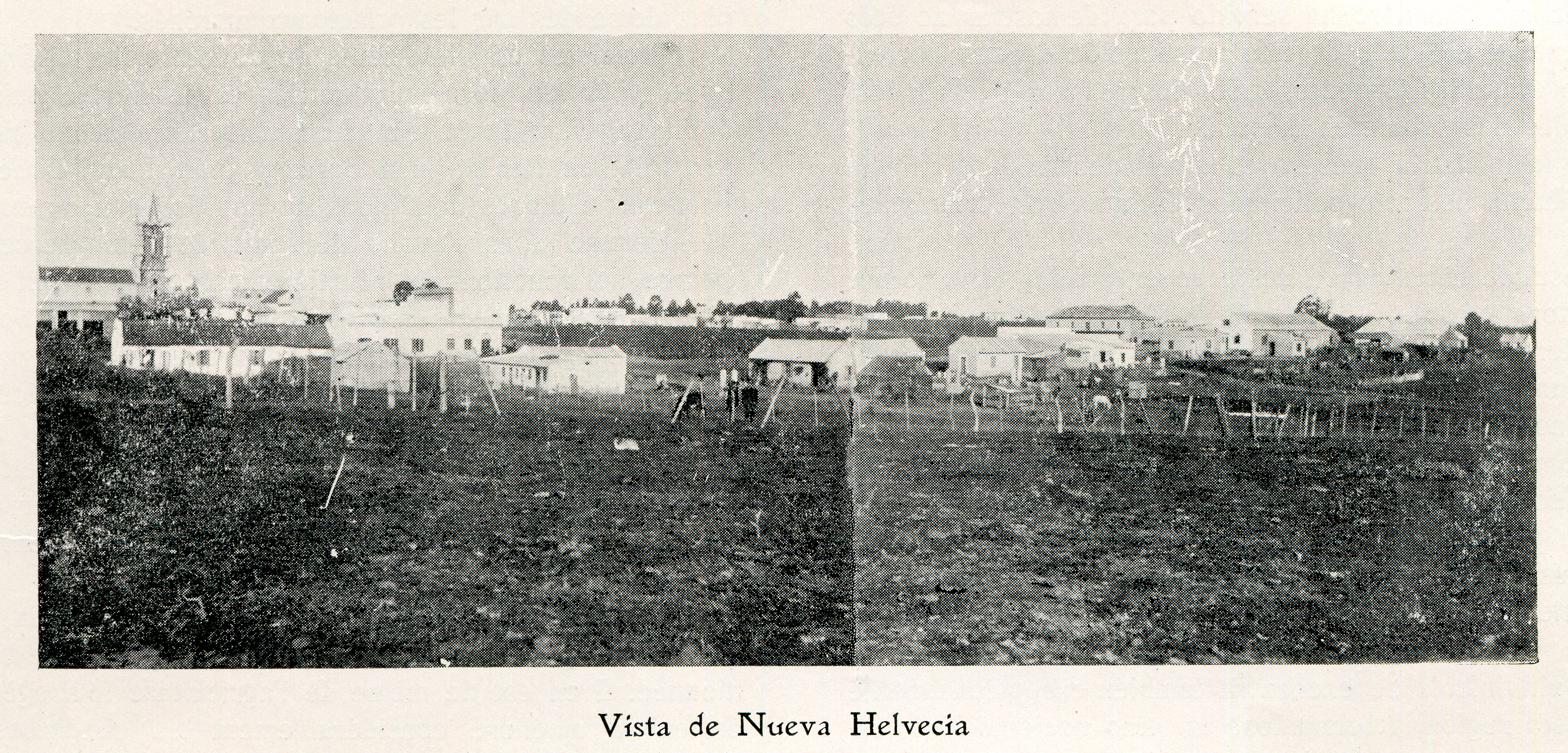
Nueva Helvecia in the 1900s.

Agriculture and cattle raising formed the economic foundation of the colony, with, later, dairy farming emerging as its principal activity. In its early years, the settlers faced a number of difficulties, including periods of drought and the bankruptcy of the administrative company responsible for the distribution of land and supplies. In 1864, the settler and political figure Federico Fischer introduced the first mechanical threshing machine in Uruguay.

By 1869, the first cheese-producing industries had been established in the area, a development that would transform the settlement—and later the surrounding region—into one of Uruguay’s main dairy-producing zones, known for its wide variety of cheeses and other dairy products.

During the 1870s, the settlement began to develop tourism-related activities with the establishment of rural hotels, including the Hotel Suizo, which accommodated several Uruguayan heads of state, such as Lorenzo Latorre, Máximo Santos, and Claudio Williman. This development helped establish Nueva Helvecia as one of Uruguay’s earliest inland tourist destinations, a process further complemented by the creation of the Swiss Shooting Society (Sociedad Tiro Suizo), considered the first shooting club in South America. On 26 May 1894, following a period of population growth, the colony was designated as a pueblo (town).

In the early 20th century, mutual aid societies, cooperatives, and cultural institutions were established to support community life. Notable examples include the women-led Sociedad de Auxilios Frauenverein (founded in 1909) and the Centro Helvético, which organized social and recreational activities, including debutante balls.

In 1958, the Nazi physician and SS officer Josef Mengele, who had fled to South America after World War II, was married in the town’s Civil Registry.

== Culture ==
The people of Nueva Helvecia have maintained Swiss traditions and customs to this day. There are several groups, including "Los Alegres Alpinos", and the "Alpenveilchen Grupo de Danzas", who still practice the songs and dances of their ancestors.

However, today, very few Nueva Helvecia residents speak the language of their ancestors, likely due to intermarriage with other populations. Even among Swiss the different dialects prevented them from communicating with each other unless they used the Spanish language.

The holidays and festivities include:

- The 25th of April, corresponding to the anniversary of the foundation of Nueva Helvecia
- The 1st of August, corresponding to the anniversary of the formation of the Swiss Confederation.
- The "Bierfest" in December attracts visitors from other departments and countries.

== Architecture ==
The city, though located in Uruguay, shares a number of features and similarities with classical and early modern European architecture, mainly those of Switzerland, Germany and France, as a result of its close link with the cultures and societies of those countries. Unlike in other cities in Uruguay, every building bears a symbolic shield representing the different Swiss cantons where the family living in the house came from. This has become more evident in recent years.

== Attractions ==
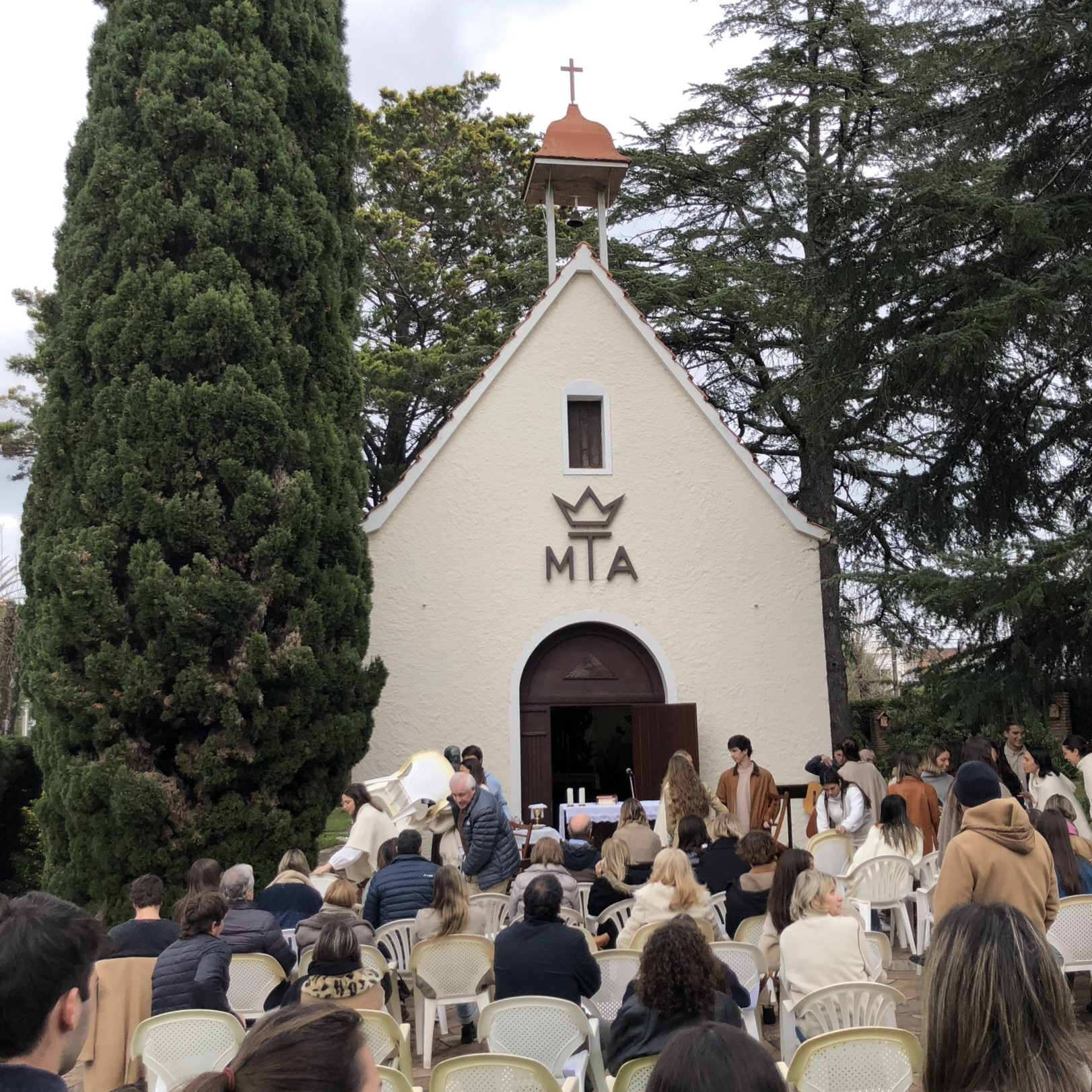
An open-air mass at the Shrine of Our Lady of Schönstatt, May 2024.

- Plaza de los Fundadores
- Tiro Suizo
- Hotel Suizo
- OSE Watertank
- Molino Quemado
- Evangelical Congregation of Nueva Helvecia (Evangelical Church of the River Plate)
- Most Holy Trinity Parish Church (Roman Catholic)
- Our Lady of Schoenstatt Chapel, a popular Roman Catholic pilgrimage sanctuary
- Cine Helvético

== Economy ==
Dairy products, including milk, Swiss cheese, cream cheese, dulce de leche, and yogurt, dominate the city's economy. Nueva Helvecia also produces a variety of sausages and animal products, fruits and vegetables, cereals and wine.

Until 1980 the Facansa enterprise produced bodywork for road vehicles.

== Location and population ==
It is located in the southeastern part of Colonia Department, Uruguay. Its population, as of 2004, was 12,000.

== Notable people ==
- Jorge Meyer Long, (born 1949) career diplomat
- Franco Israel, (born 2000), professional footballer
- Pedro Ignacio Wolcan Olano, (born 1953) bishop of Tacuarembó
- Rodrigo Bentancur (born 1997), association football player
- Jorge Meyer Long (born 1949), diplomat
- Horacio Troche (1935-2014), association football player and trainer
- Nibia Sabalsagaray (1949-1974), educator murdered during the Uruguayan dictatorship

== Sources ==
- Annaheim, Hans (1967). "Die Kolonie Nueva Helvecia in Uruguay". en Regio Basiliensis. 8: 27–76. ISSN 0034-3293.
- Arlettaz, Gérald (1979). "Emigration et colonisation suisses en Amérique 1815-1918". Études et Sources, Archives Fédérales Suisses. 5: 5–236. ISSN 1420-8725.
- Aschwanden, Prisca. Die schweizerische Einwanderung in Uruguay zwischen 1880–1929, Lizentiatsarbeit, Universität Zürich, 1990.
- Caro, Marice. Los Bratschi en el Río de la Plata. David Salomón Bratschi, el primer colono suizo en la colonia agrícola de Nueva Helvecia. ISBN 978-0-692-48115-8
- Caro, Marice Ettlin. The Swiss Colony of Uruguay. David Salomon Bratschi, the first settler of "Nueva Helvecia". ISBN 978-0-692-59318-9
- Caro, Marice Ettlin. La Genealogia de los Ettlin, del canton de Unterwalden a la Americas. ISBN 978-0-692-54276-7
- Caro, Marice Ettlin. The Ettlin Genealogy, from the Canton of Unterwalden to the Americas. ISBN 978-0-692-57332-7
- Caro, Marice Ettlin. La Colonia Suiza que casi no lo fue: Nueva Helvecia. ISBN 978-0-692-78715-1
- Caro, Marice Ettlin. Bienvenidos a Nueva Helvecia. ISBN 978-0-692-66079-9
- Wirth, Juan Carlos F. Historia de la Iglesia Evangélica de Nueva Helvecia, 1944.
- Wirth, Juan Carlos F. Colonia Suiza hace 80 años, 1947.
- Wirth, Juan Carlos F. Historia de colonia suiza [de l'Uruguay], ed. por el Comité Ejucutivo pro-festejos del centenario de Colonia Suiza, Nueva Helvecia, 1962.
- Wirth, Juan Carlos F. Del Havre al Río de la Plata en 47 días, 1974.
- Wirth, Juan Carlos F. Génesis de la colonia agrícola suiza Nueva Helvecia: historia, documentos y carografia, Ministerio de Educación y Cultura, Montevideo, 1980.
- Zbinden, Carl. Die schweizerische Auswanderung nach Argentinien, Uruguays, Chili und Paraguay, dissertation, Universität Bern, Affoltern a. A., 1931.
- Ziegler, Sonia; Naón, Ignacio. Suizos en Uruguay, 224 pp., Montevideo, febrero de 2007. ISBN 9974-32-320-7
- Ziegler, Sonia. Pequeña historias de Grandes mujeres. La historia de la Colonia Suiza en Uruguay a través de sus mujeres. ISBN 978-9974-98-594-0
