= Carla Witte =

German-Uruguayan painter, sculptor, and teacher

- Born: Carla Witte; May 20, 1889; Leipzig, Germany
- Died: May 8, 1943 (aged 53); Montevideo, Uruguay
- Education: Studied plastic arts in Berlin, influenced by Bauhaus
- Known for: Painting, Sculpture, Illustration, Teaching
- Notable work: Portrait of Joaquín Torres-García (1936)
- Style: Expressionism, Graphic Arts
- Movement: Expressionism, Bauhaus influence

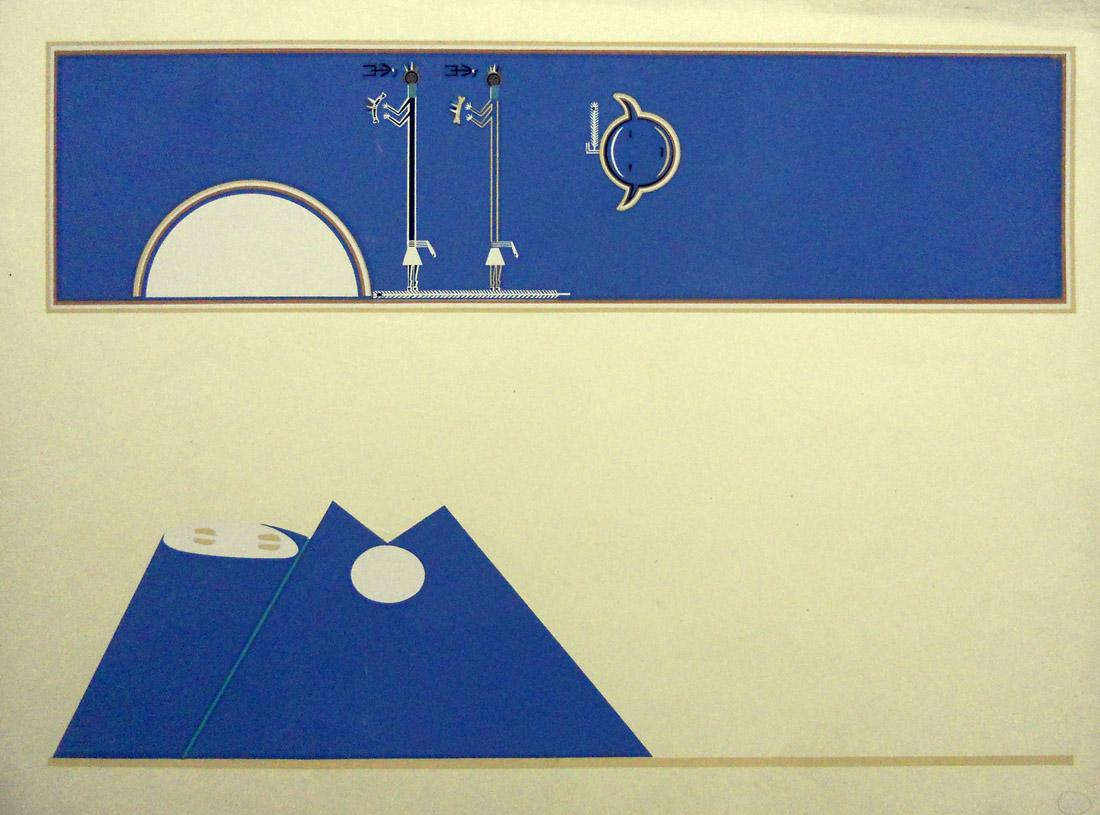
Carla Witte, Sin Titulo

Carla Witte (20 May 1889 – 8 May 1943) was a German-Uruguayan painter, sculptor, and teacher.

== Biography ==
Carla Witte was born in Leipzig, a German city in Saxony on 20 May 1889, and studied plastic arts in Berlin. In 1927, she emigrated to Uruguay and found lodging in the capital, Montevideo, and became a citizen in 1932. According to Mariví Ugolino, Witte "began her artistic production within this movement [ expressionism ] (...) She brought with her the memory of exhibitions that different groups had made in the cities where she had lived and perhaps participated in. She creates at the same time as them and passes, like all of them, through the different stages of the movement."

She was an illustrator for the magazine La Pluma, owned by Alberto Zum Felde. According to Nelson Di Maggio, Witte's graphic arts were clearly inspired by the Bauhaus School of the interwar Weimar Republic. Witte would also portray many contemporary Uruguayan painters, such as Joaquín Torres-García, whom she would render on canvass in 1936. As a sculptor, she would work with Ernst Barlach.
