= Charles William King =

British Victorian writer and collector of gems

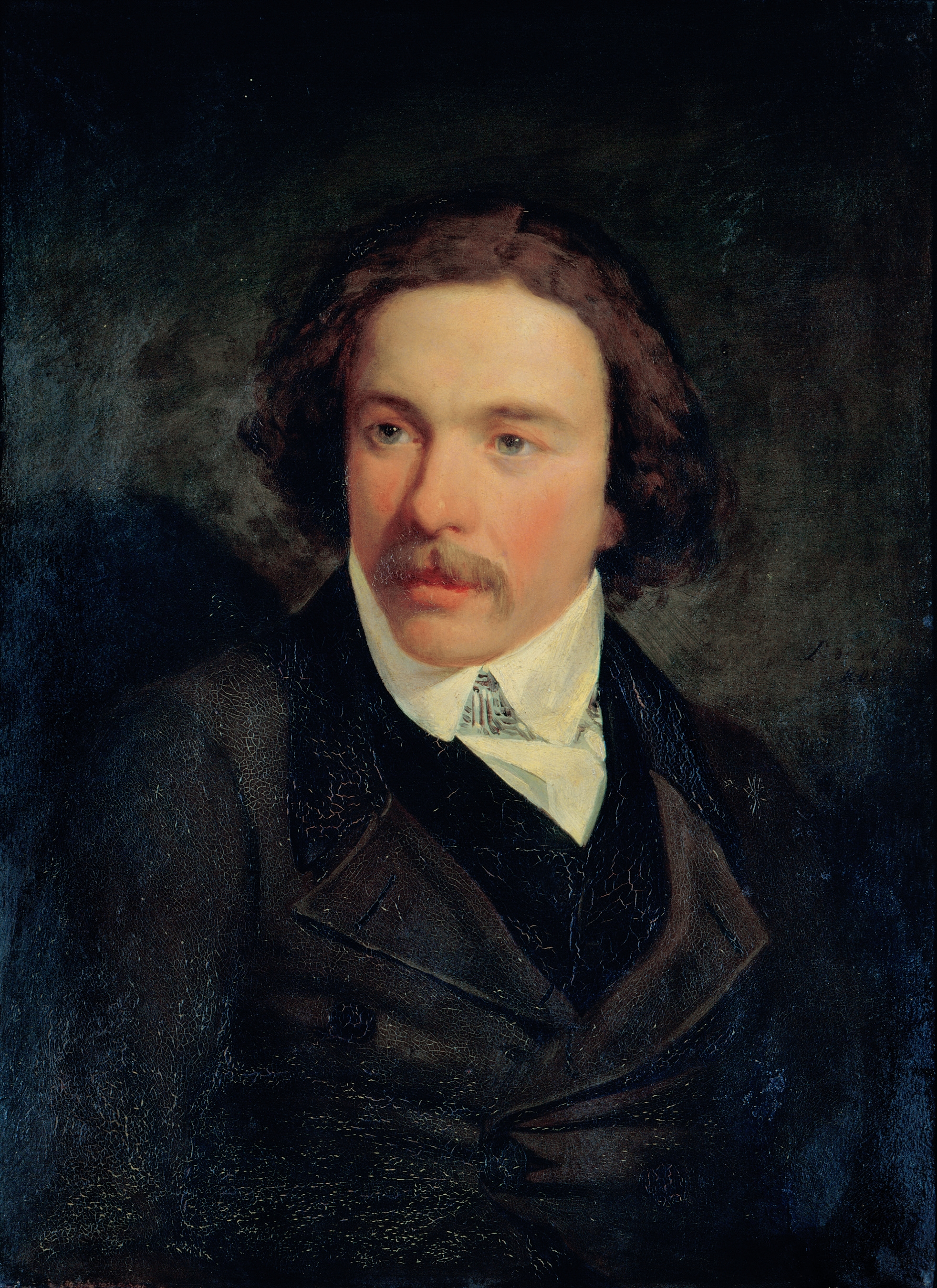
Portrait of C. W. King (1847), by the Viscount of Meneses

Charles William King (5 September 1818 – 25 March 1888) was a British Victorian writer and collector of gems.

== Early life ==
King was born in Newport, Monmouthshire, and entered Trinity College, Cambridge, in 1836. He graduated in 1840, and obtained a fellowship in 1842. He was a senior fellow by the time of his death in London. He took holy orders, but never held any parish position.

== Gem expert ==
King spent much time in Italy, where he laid the foundation of his collection of engraved gems and gemstones, which, having been increased by subsequent purchases in London, was sold by him in consequence of his failing eyesight, and was presented in 1881 to the Metropolitan Museum of Art, New York.

He was recognized universally as one of the greatest authorities in this department of art. His chief works on the subject are:

- Antique Gems, their Origin, Uses and Value (1860), a complete and exhaustive treatise
- The Natural History of Precious Stones and Gems and of the Precious Metals (1865)
- Early Christian Numismatics (1873)
- The Handbook of Engraved Gems (2nd ed., 1885)
- The Gnostics and their Remains (2nd ed. by J Jacobs, 1887, which led to an animated correspondence in the Athenaeum)

== Classicist ==
King was thoroughly familiar with the works of Greek and Latin authors, especially those of Pausanias and Pliny the Elder, which bore upon the subject in which he was most interested; but he had little taste for the minutiae of verbal criticism. In 1869, he brought out an edition of Horace, illustrated from antique gems. He also translated Plutarch's Moralia (1882) and the theosophical works of the Emperor Julian (1888), for Bohn's Classical Library.

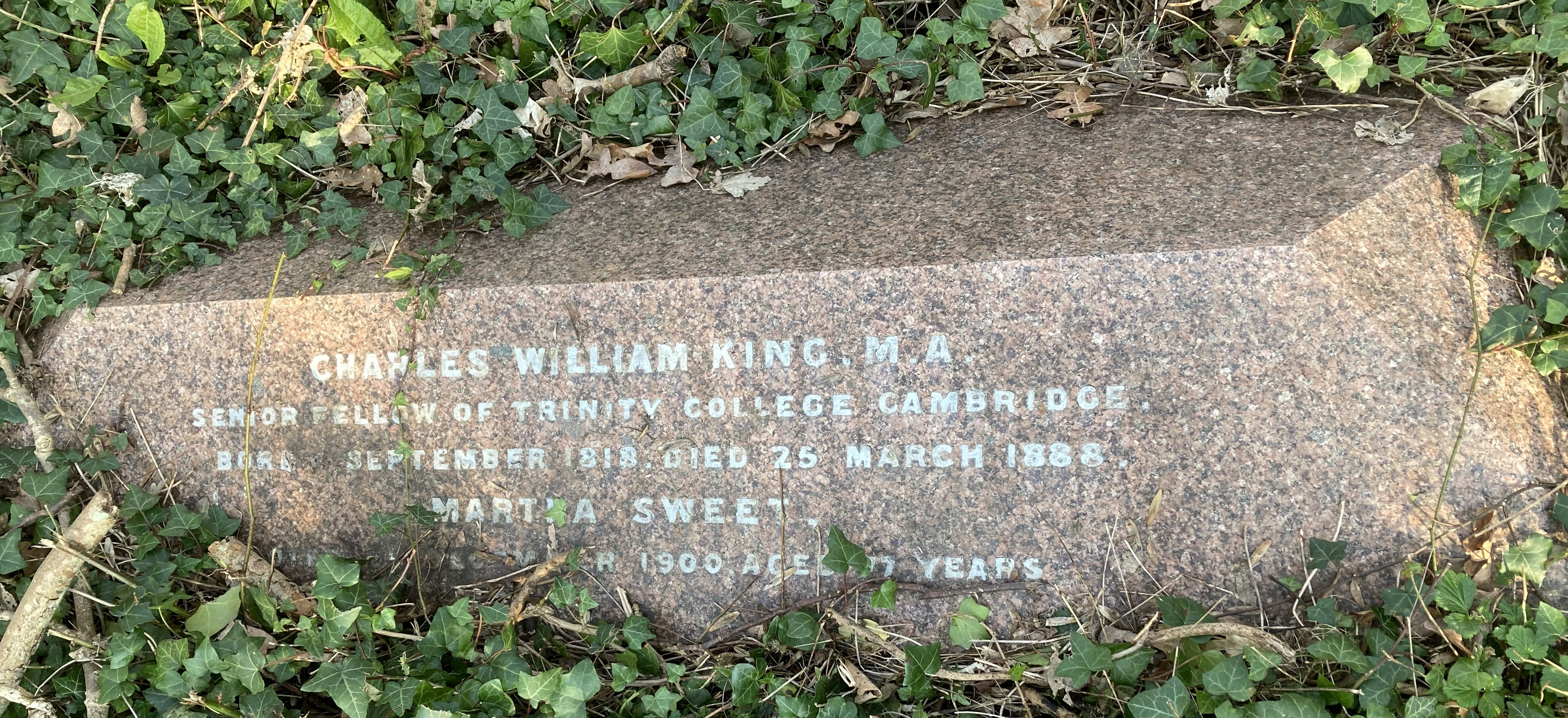
Grave of Charles William King in Highgate Cemetery (east side)

== Death ==
King died on 25 March 1888 and was buried in a family vault at Highgate Cemetery (east side).
