= Swiss Uruguayans =

Uruguayan citizens of Swiss ancestry

Schweizuruguayer (German) Helvético-Uruguayens (French) Svizzero-uruguaiani (Italian)
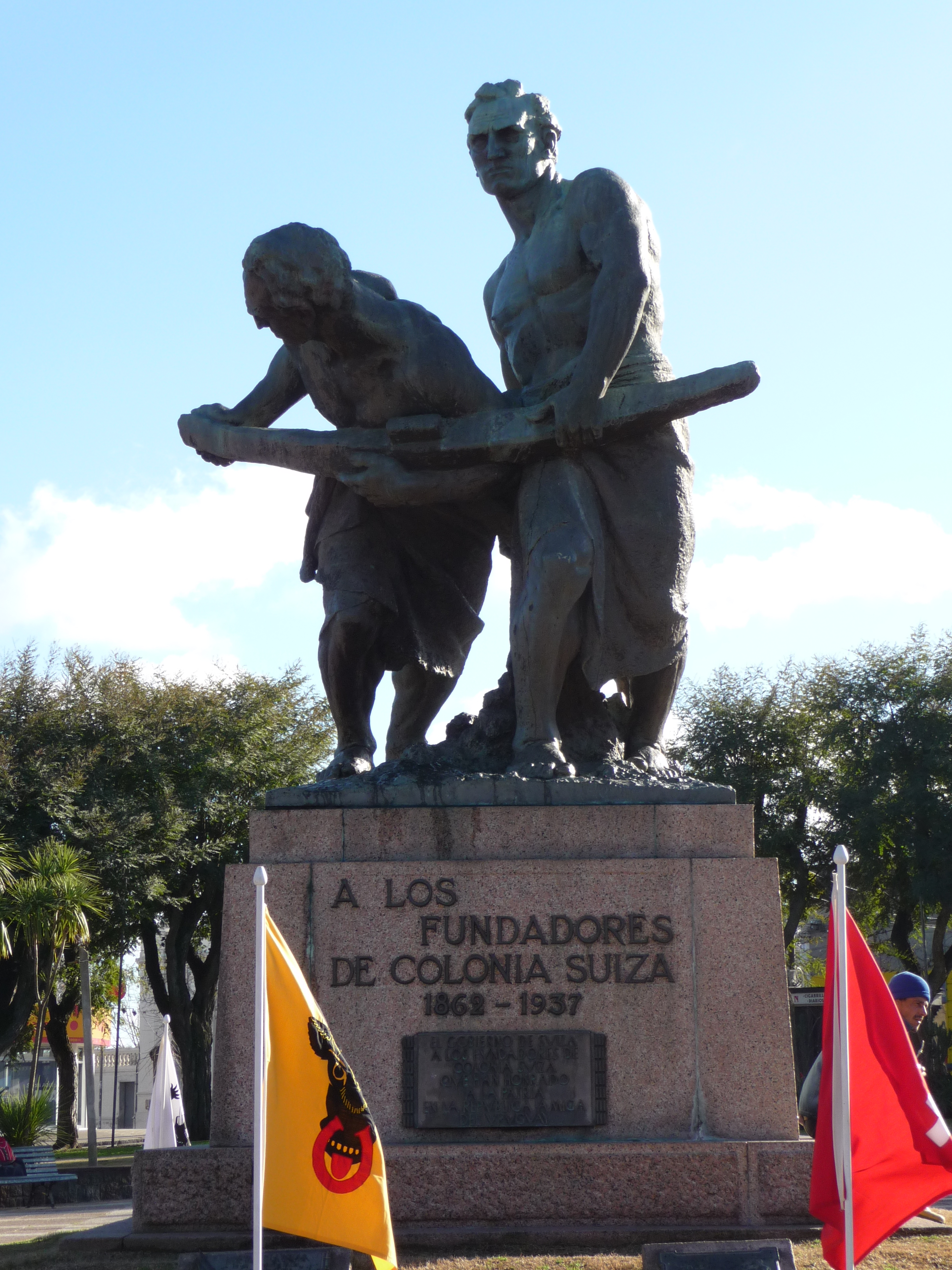
- Monument to the founders of Nueva Helvecia, an early Swiss settlement in Uruguay.

Total population
- 60,000; ~1.8% of the Uruguyan population (2014)

Regions with significant populations
- Throughout Uruguay, especially in settlements founded by Swiss immigrants.

Languages
- Spanish · French · German • Italian • Romansh

Religion
- Christianity (mainly Roman Catholicism and Protestantism)

Related ethnic groups
- Swiss · Other ethnic groups of Uruguay: French Uruguayans, German Uruguayans, Brazilian Uruguayans, British Uruguayans, Irish Uruguayans, Italian Uruguayans, Russian Uruguayans, Polish Uruguayans, Bulgarian Uruguayans, Hungarian Uruguayans, Ukrainian Uruguayans, Lithuanian Uruguayans, Austrian Uruguayans, Croatian Uruguayans, Greek Uruguayans · Other Swiss in other nations: Swiss Argentines, Swiss Brazilians, Swiss Chileans, Swiss Americans

Swiss Uruguayans are Uruguayan citizens of full or partial Swiss ancestry, who remain culturally connected to Switzerland, or Swiss-born people permanently residing in Uruguay. They are estimated to be around 60,000.

== History ==
In 1860, the Basel bank of Siegrist und Fender purchased farm land in Uruguay. It was not long before the first Swiss citizens moved to Uruguay with the goal of working the land as farmers, where they founded the colony of Nueva Helvecia around 1862.

As of 2008, there were 956 people with Swiss passports residing in Uruguay.

== Notable Swiss Uruguayans ==
Past

- José Belloni (1882–1965), sculptor
- Roque Gastón Máspoli (1917–2004), football player and coach
- Juan José Morosoli (1899–1959), writer
- Bernardo Poncini (1814–1874), architect

Present

- Rodrigo Bentancur (born 1997), footballer
- Julián Schweizer (born 1998), surfer
- Matías Vitkieviez (born 1985), footballer
- Walter Zimmer (born 1945), physician and politician

== See also ==
- Nueva Helvecia
- Switzerland–Uruguay relations
- Austrian Uruguayans
- French Uruguayans
- German Uruguayans
- Italian Uruguayans

== Bibliography ==
- Caro, Marice Ettlin (2016). La Colonia Suiza que casi no lo fue: Nueva Helvecia (in Spanish). Marice Caro. ISBN 978-0-692-78715-1.
- Sommer-Geiser, Jacob (1861). Lebens-Bilder aus dem Staate Uruguay in Süd-Amerika und seine Verhältnisse in agricoler, commerzieller und industrieller Beziehung für schweizerische Ansiedlungen. Basel.
