= Facansa =

Facansa (Fabrica de Carrocerias Andres Nemer S.A.) was a national bodywork company based in the city of Nueva Helvecia in Colonia Department of Uruguay. It was active from 1960 to 1980, producing bodies for buses of the company COPSA, mainly on imported Mercedes-Benz OH 1313 chassis.
