= Austria–Uruguay relations =

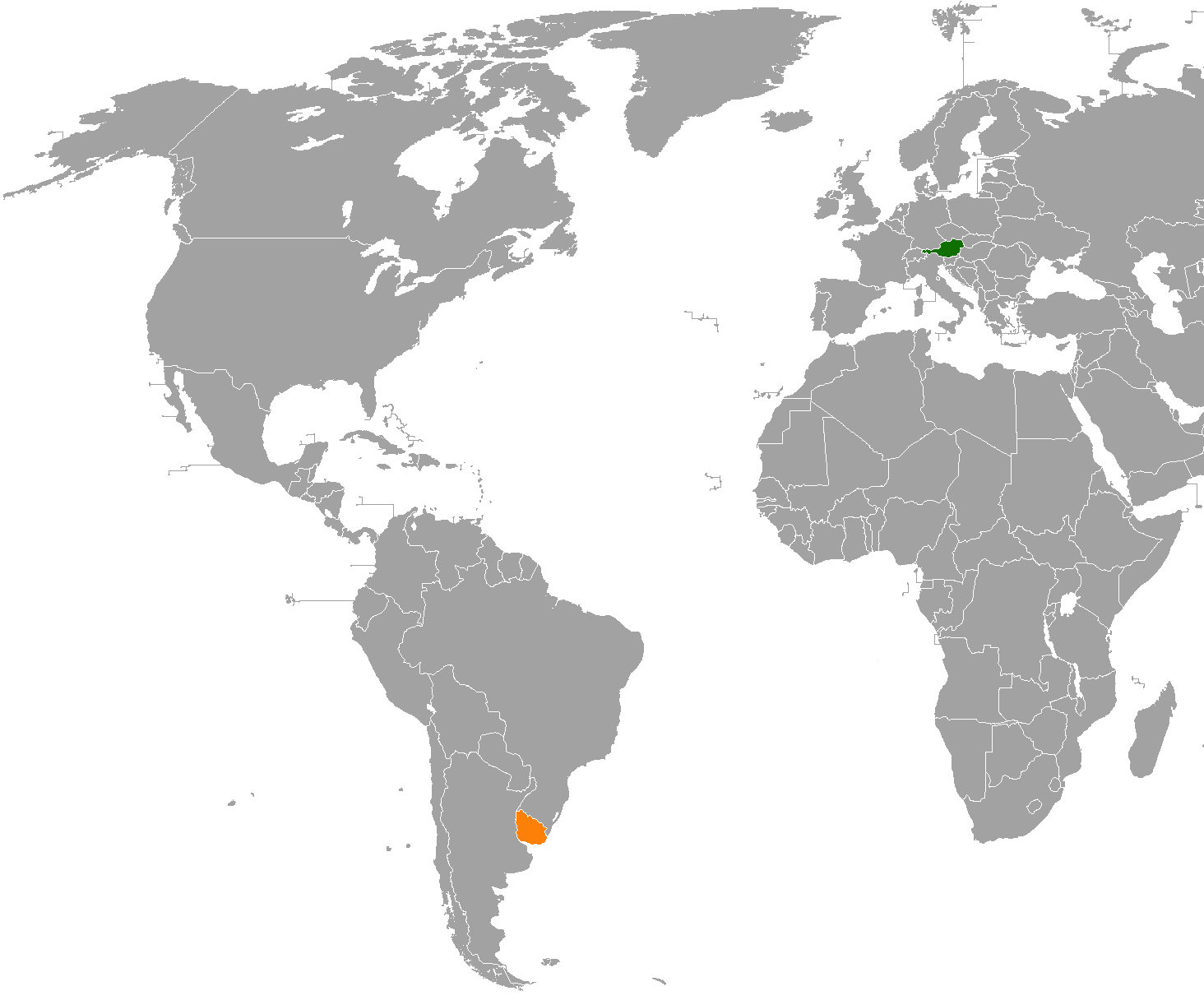
- Austria: Uruguay

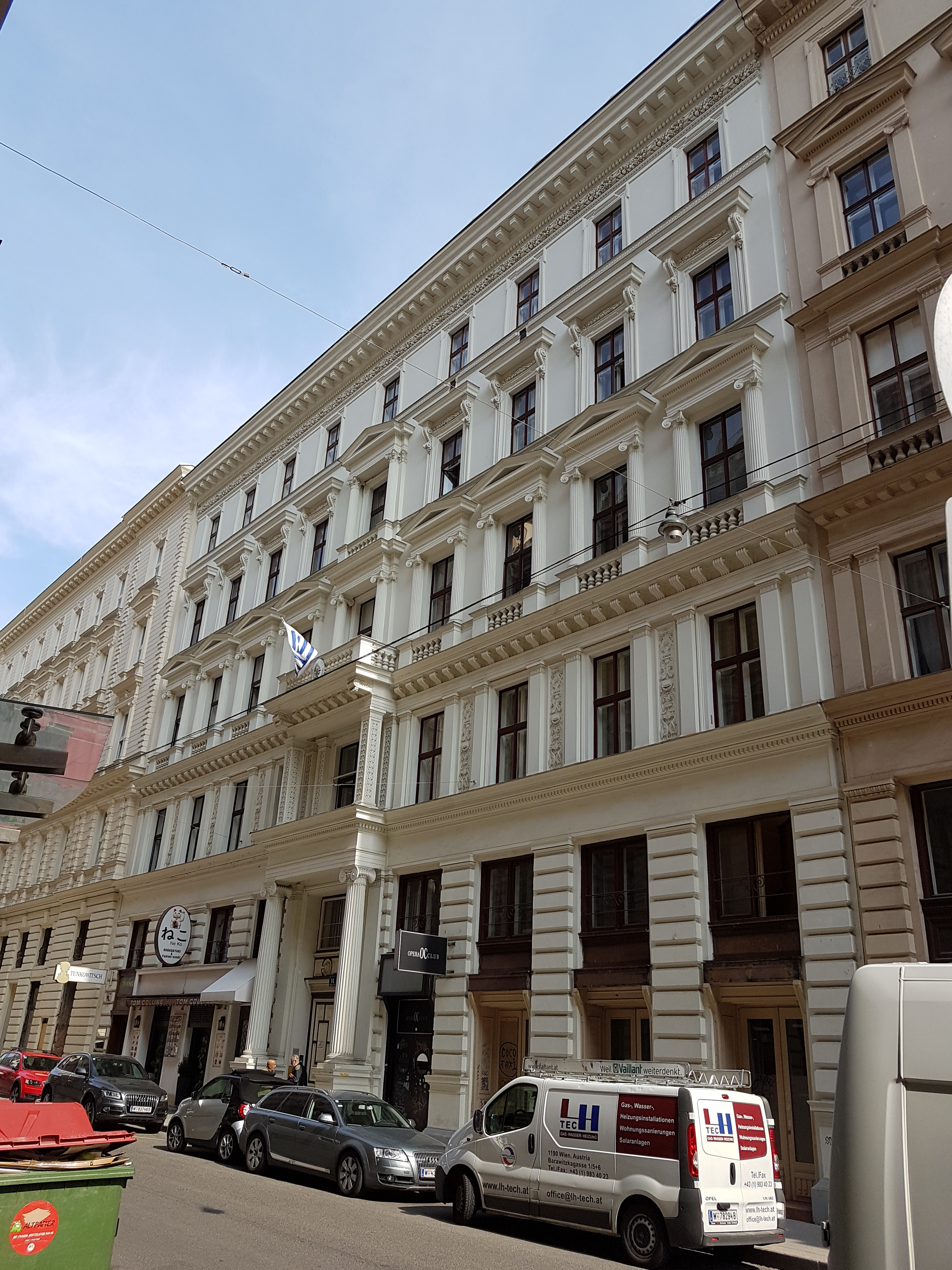
Embassy of Uruguay in Vienna

Diplomatic relations between both countries exist since the times of the Austro-Hungarian Empire: in 1870, Baron Anton von Petz celebrated a Treaty of Friendship, Trade and Navigation between both countries.

The Austrian Ambassador in Buenos Aires is concurrent to Uruguay; Austria has an honorary consulate in Montevideo. Uruguay has an embassy in Vienna (the ambassador being also concurrent to Hungary and Slovakia) and a consulate in Salzburg.

There is also a small but significant group of people with Austrian descent in Uruguay, including some former members of the Austrian nobility.

Since 2009 there is a Social Security Agreement between both countries.

== See also ==
- Austrians in Uruguay
- Foreign relations of Austria
- Foreign relations of Uruguay
