= Jorge Meyer Long =

Uruguayan diplomat (born 1949)

Uruguayan ambassador to Russia
- In office April 13, 2007 – September 1, 2012
- Preceded by: Alberto Leopoldo Fajardo Klappenbach
- Succeeded by: Enrique Juan Delgado Genta

Uruguayan ambassador to Switzerland
- In office September 1, 2014 – June 14, 2019
- Preceded by: Luis Ricardo Nario May 21, 1979: Jorge Pacheco Areco
- Succeeded by: Alejandro Garofali Acosta

Personal details
- Born: June 1, 1949 (age 76) Nueva Helvecia
- Spouse(s): Nubia Pirone Gómez, Notary
- Occupation: Civil servant, Ambassador,

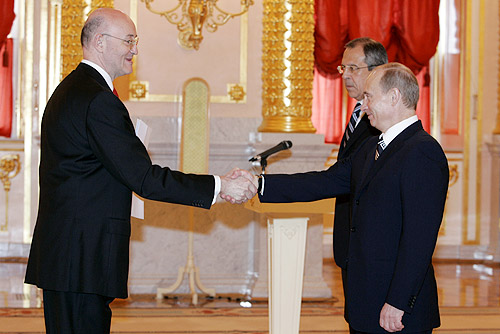
Meyer Long presenting his credentials to Russian president Vladimir Putin on 13 April 2007 in the Moscow Kremlin.

Jorge Alberto Meyer Long is an Uruguayan diplomat, since September 1, 2014 he is ambassador in Bern.

From April 13, 2007 to September 1, 2014 he was ambassador in Moscow, and as of November 27, 2007 he was concurrently accredited in Yerevan. With residence in Moscow, Dr. Jorge Meyer Long, was Ambassador of Uruguay in Russia, Armenia, Ukraine and Kazakhstan. He was director of the prestigious Artigas Institute, which is the Diplomatic School of Uruguay. He has a PhD in International Relations from the University of the Republic (Uruguay). Jorge Meyer is a native of Nueva Helvecia and great-grandson of a Swiss.
