= Parque Martinelli de Carrasco =

Cemetery in Canelones, Uruguay

Coordinates: 34°48′55″S 56°01′37″W

- Interactive map of Parque Martinelli de Carrasco

Details
- Established: 1999
- Location: Canelones Department
- Country: Uruguay
- Owned by: Concesionaria Martinelli S. A.
- Find a Grave: Parque Martinelli de Carrasco

Parque Martinelli de Carrasco is a private cemetery in Uruguay.

It is located at Canelones Department, near Colonia Nicolich, on the Ruta 102.

== History ==
The cemetery was established in 1999; it is operated by Martinelli, a provider of funeral services.

Juan Maria Bordaberry Arocena (1928–2011), President of Uruguay from 1972 to 1976, is buried there.
