= Horacio Troche =

Uruguayan footballer (1935–2014)

Personal information
- Full name: Florencio Horacio Troche Herrera
- Date of birth: 4 February 1935
- Place of birth: Nueva Helvecia, Uruguay
- Date of death: 14 July 2014 (aged 79)
- Height: 1.73 m (5 ft 8 in)
- Position: Defender

Youth career
- –1953: Nacional de Nueva Helvecia

Senior career*
Years	Team	Apps	(Gls)
1951–1953	Nacional Nueva Helvecia		
1954–1955	Estudiantes Rosario		
1956–1962	Nacional	90	(1)
1963	Huracán	24	(0)
1964–1966	Cerro		
1967–1968	Alemannia Aachen	24	(0)
1968–1971	Bonner SC	118	(2)
1971–1975	SV Beuel 06		
Total		232+	(3+)

International career
1959–1966	Uruguay	28	(0)

Managerial career
- 1975–1976: Guadalajara
- 1976–1977: Laguna
- 1977–1978: Tampico Madero
- 1989–1990: Deportivo Irapuato
- * Club domestic league appearances and goals

Florencio Horacio Troche Herrera (4 February 1935 – 14 July 2014) was a Uruguayan professional footballer who played as a defender.

== Career ==
Born in Nueva Helvecia, Troche began playing football with local side Nacional de Nueva Helvecia as a central defender. Later, he would play for Club Nacional de Football and C.A. Cerro.

Troche moved abroad to play for Club Atlético Huracán in 1963 and again for one season in the Bundesliga for Alemannia Aachen in 1967.

Troche played 28 times for the Uruguay national team between 1959 and 1966, and featured at the 1962 World Cup in Chile and at the 1966 World Cup in England. Troche became noted when he, during the quarter-final match against West Germany, got into a brawl with Uwe Seeler and boxed him on the ear. Uruguay lost the match 4–0.

After he retired from playing, Troche became a manager leading Mexican Primera División sides C.D. Guadalajara and Club de Fútbol Laguna.
