= Carlos Rehermann =

Uruguayan novelist and playwright

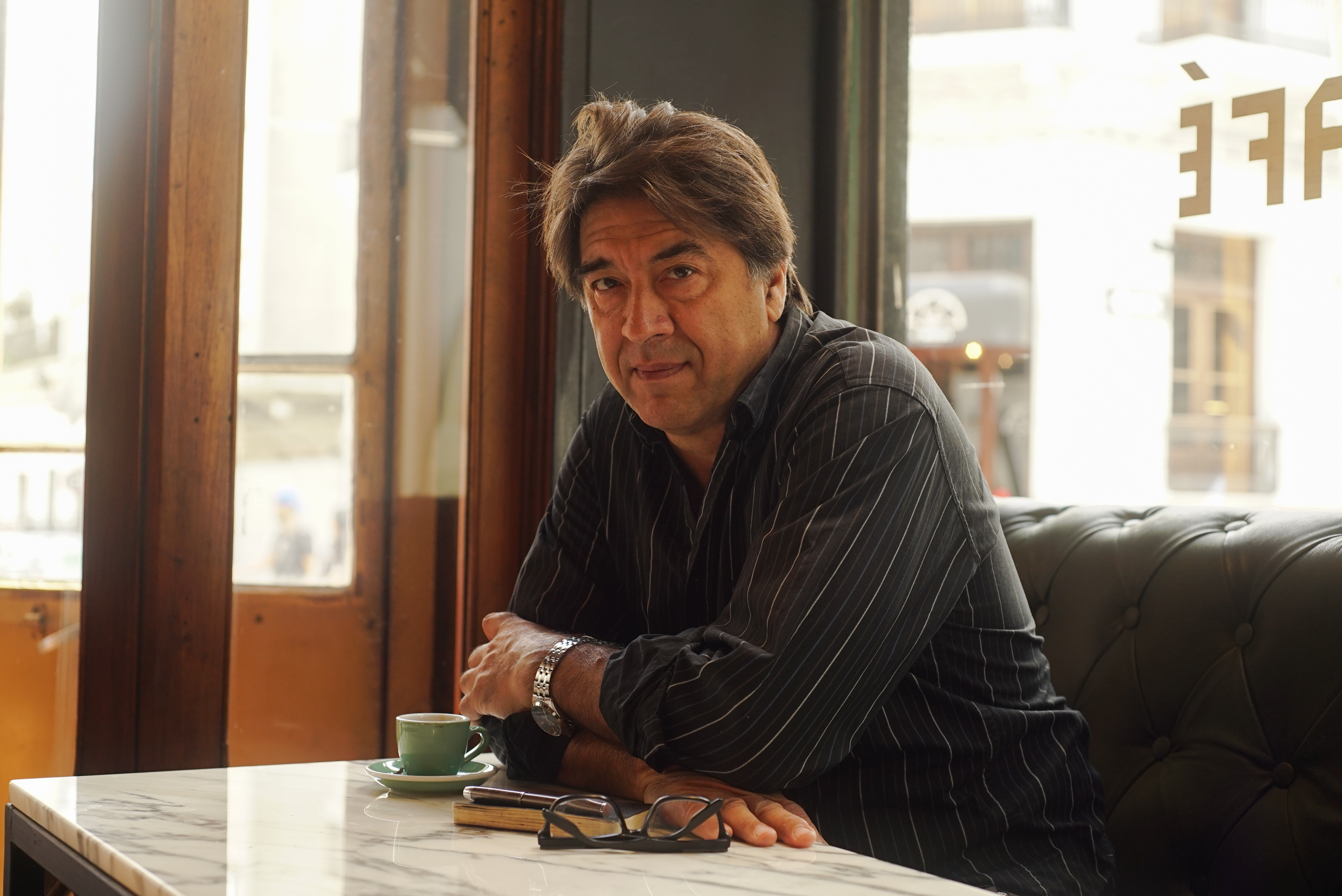
- Born: Carlos Rehermann; February 10, 1961; Montevideo, Uruguay
- Occupations: Writer, playwright
- Writing career
- Notable awards: Premio Morosoli

Carlos Rehermann (born in Montevideo, 1961) is a Uruguayan novelist and playwright, active since 1990. He has published nine novels and staged seven plays. He writes weekly columns on the arts. He won the Florencio Award in 2002 for his play "A la guerra en taxi" ("To the front by cab", an Amedeo Modigliani stage biography). Florencio-Nominated, 2006, winner, "Solos en el escenario"-Prize—Centro Cultural de España—for "Basura" ("Filth"). Premio Nacional de Letras (National Literary Prize) for "El examen" ("The examination"), based on an episode of the life of Primo Levi, 2008. COFONTE Prize of Dramaturgy for "El examen", 2008.

All his plays were staged at international Theatre Festivals (Temporales Internacionales de Teatro de Puerto Montt, Chile—2001–2005; Festival Internacional de Teatro Unipersonal, Uruguay—2006, Bienal de Teatro de Paysandú—2006). Rehermann is an architect from the Universidad de la República of Uruguay, but he has devoted his life to writing since 2000. He is currently Coordinator of Dramaturgy at the Ministry of Culture in Uruguay. He is also a press (la diaria) and radio (Radio Cultura) journalist, focused on culture, literature and art issues.

== Bibliography ==
=== Books ===
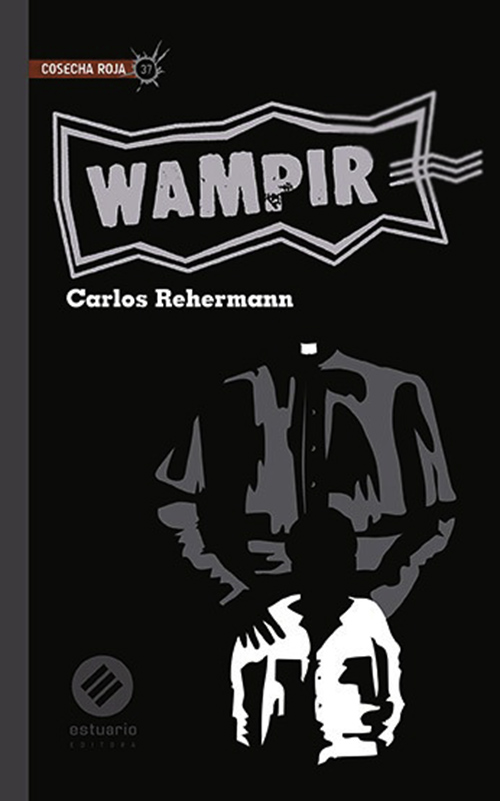

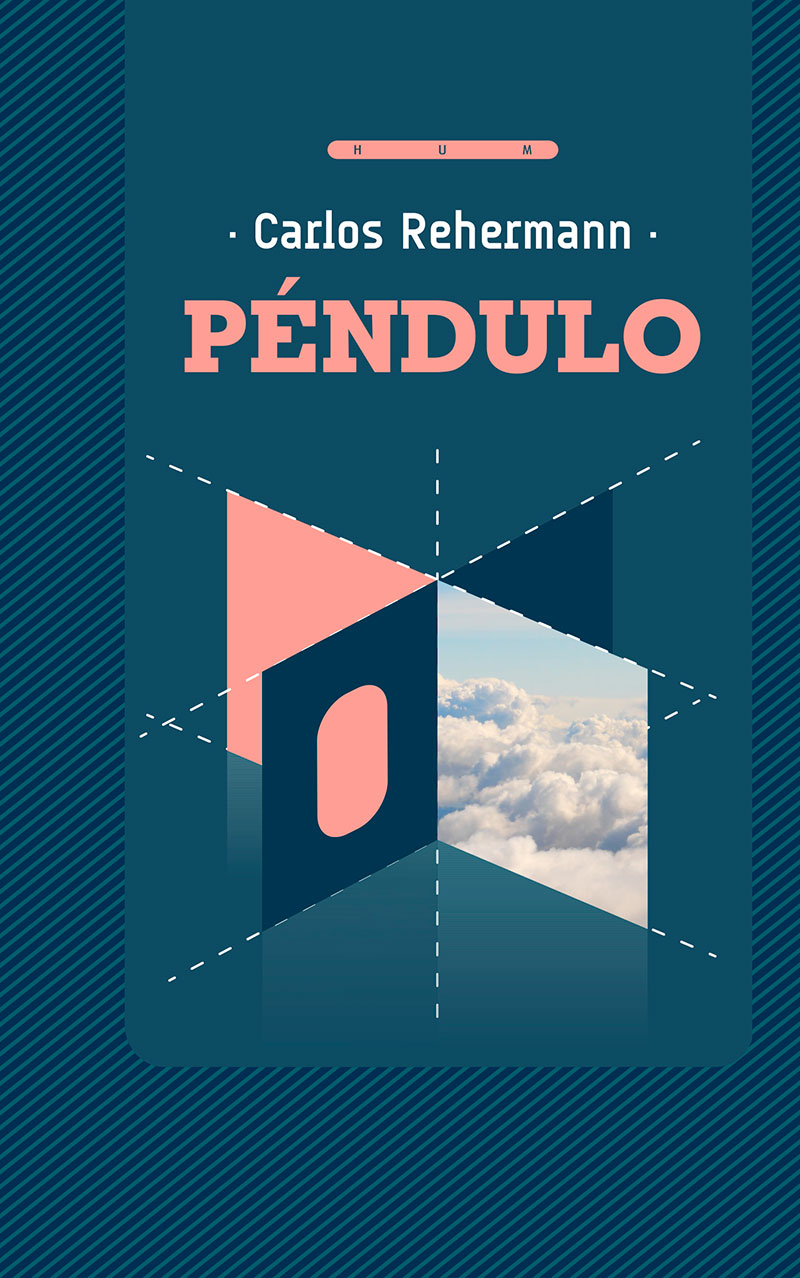

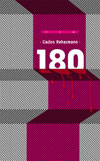

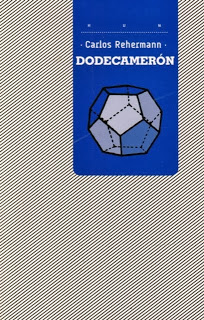

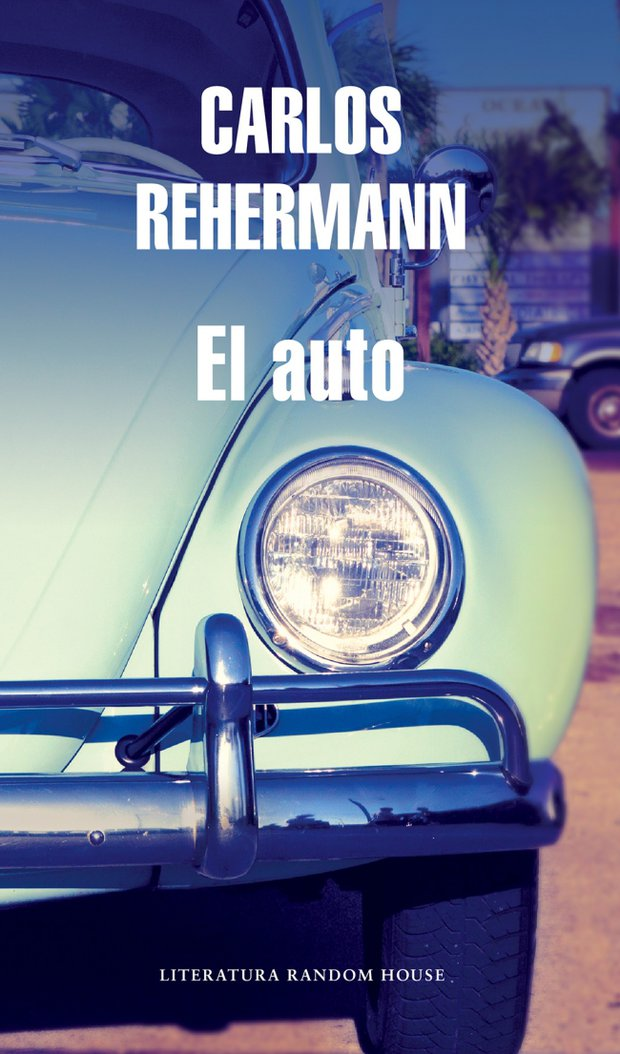

- Los días de la luz deshilachada, Novel, 1990, Ed. Signos, Montevideo
- El robo del cero Wharton, Novel, 1995, Ed. Trilce, Montevideo
- El canto del pato, Novel, 2000, Ed. Planeta, Montevideo
- Prometeo y la jarra de pandora, Drama, 2006, Ed. Artefato, Montevideo
- Basura, in Solos en el escenario, Drama, 2006, Centro Cultural de España, Montevideo
- Dodecameron, 2008, Novel, Ed. HUM, Montevideo
- Mapa de la muerte, Drama, in Solos en el escenario, 2009, Centro Cultural de España, Montevideo
- 180, 2010, Novel, Ed. HUM, Montevideo
- Basura y otros textos para teatro, Drama, 2012, Ed. Estuario, Montevideo.
- El auto, 2015, Novel, Ed. Penguin Random House, Montevideo.
- Tesoro, 2016, Novel, Ediciones de la Banda Oriental, Montevideo.
- Letra en la piedra. Inscripciones en arquitecturas montevideanas, 2018, Loca Edición, Montevideo
- L'auto, 2019, L'atinoir, Marseille. Traduicción de Antoine Barral
- Péndulo, 2023, HUM, Montevideo
- 2023, Wampir, Estuario Editora, Montevideo.
- 2026, Parque Hotel, estuario Editora, Montevideo

=== Plays ===
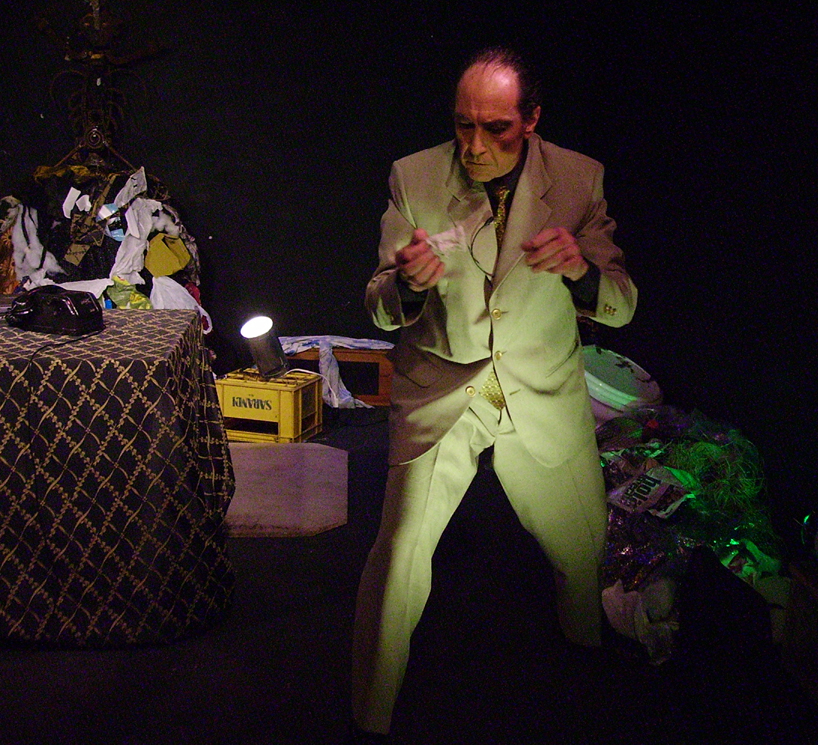
Roberto Foliatti en "Basura" (2006)

- Congreso de sexología, 1999
- Minotauros, 2000
- A la guerra en taxi, 2002
- Prometeo y la jarra de Pandora, 2005
- Basura, 2006
- El Examen, 2008
- Mapa de la Muerte, 2009

=== Awards ===
- 2002 Premio Florencio [main theatre award in Uruguay] al mejor texto teatral de autor nacional [best stageplay] (A la guerra en taxi).
- 2005 Centro Cultural de España Award (Prometeo y la jarra de Pandora).
- 2006 "Solos en el Escenario" Award (Centro Cultural de España) (Basura).
- 2006 Nominado al premio Florencio a mejor texto de autor nacional por Basura.
- 2008 Premio Nacional de Letras [National Literary Prize] (El examen).
- 2008 COFONTE Award (El examen).
- 2009 "Solos en el Escenario II" Award (Centro Cultural de España) (Mapa de la muerte).
- 2009 Iberesecen Award (Recto/Verso).
- 2010 Morosoli Silver Award for playwrigths.
- 2012 Segundo Premio Anual de Literatura [National Literary Prize] por la novela 180.
- 2014 Primer Premio Anual de Literatura (Ministerio de Educación y Cultura de Uruguay) ("Basura y otros textos para teatro").
- 2016 "Narradores de Banda Oriental" Award ("Tesoro")
- 2022 "Intendencia de Rocha" Award ("Wampir").

== Traductions ==
- French: L'auto, 2019, Trans. Antoine Barral. Ed. Latinoir, Marseille.
- 2019, Portugués, A prova, Trad. de El examen, Silvana Garcia.
- Italian: Pendolo, 2024, Trans. Cinzia Gelsomina Imperio. Ed. Fuorilinea, Monterotondo.
- Vietnamese: Rác Rưởi, 2022, Trans. Tri C. Tran, Ed. Nhân Ảnh, Huntington Beach.
