= Mennonites in Uruguay =

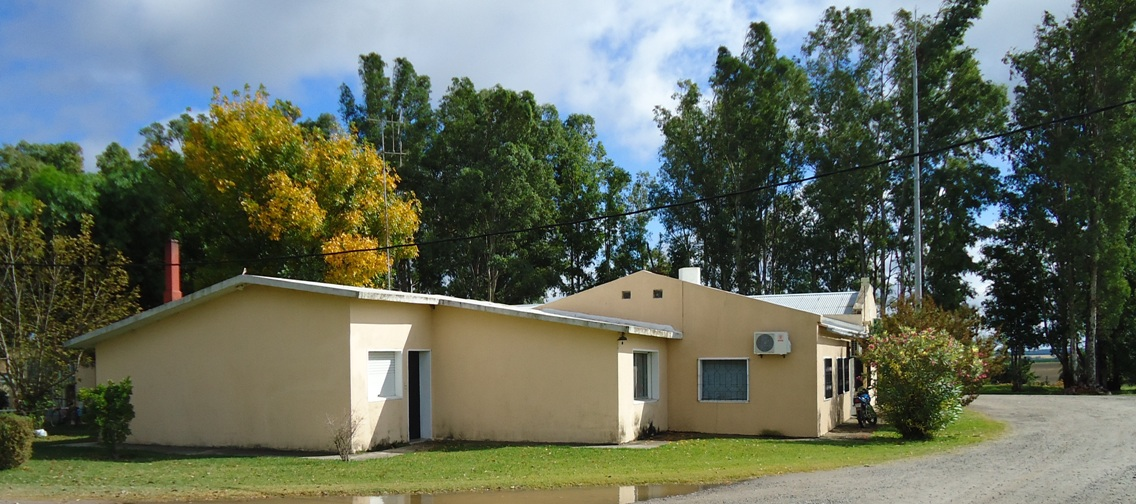
- Zentralhaus in the colony of Gartental

Total population
- 1,457 members in 2012

Religions
- Anabaptist

Scriptures
- The Bible

Languages
- Spanish · Plautdietsch · Standard German

Mennonites in Uruguay have been present since 1948. The Mennonites of Uruguay are made up of ethnic Plautdietsch-speaking Russian Mennonites, who are descendants of Friesian, Flemish and Prussian people, as well as Spanish-speaking Uruguayans of all ethnic backgrounds, that converted responding to the missionary efforts of the immigrants.

The immigrants belong to a group that is often referred to as Russian Mennonites, because they developed into an ethnic group in the Russian Empire. At the end of the century there were over 1,000 living on Uruguayan territory.

== Origin ==
The majority of the 1,200 Mennonites who came to Uruguay in the aftermath of World War II lived for about 400 years in the Vistula delta until they were expulsed. A minority came from the region around Lemberg. They spoke and party still speak Plautdietsch, the language which developed in the Vistula delta and which until today unites all conservative "Russian" Mennonites, that have their origin in that region.

== History ==
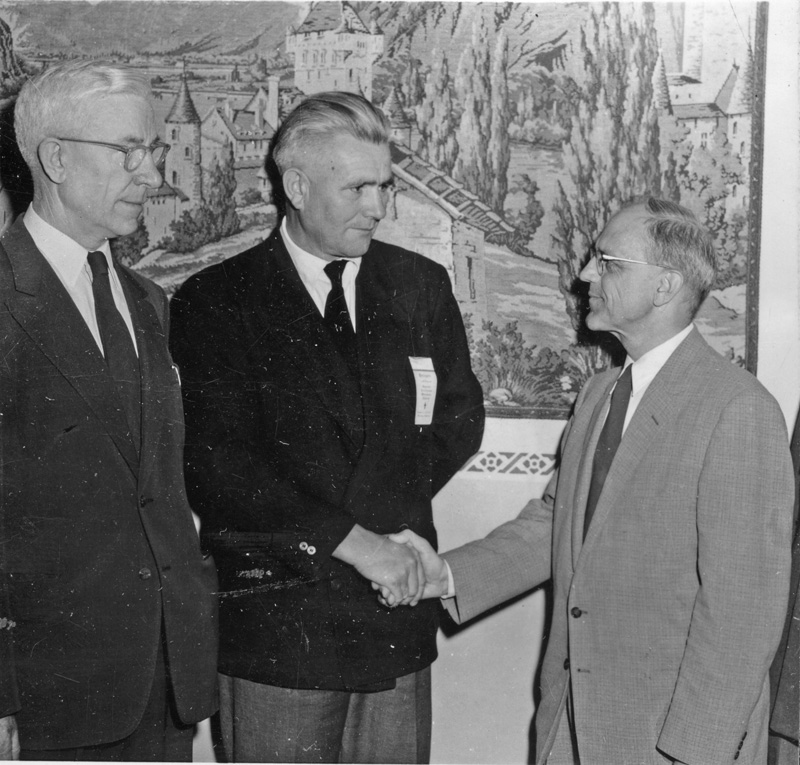
1956 General Conference Mennonite Church meeting (left to right: Gerhard Lohrenz, Ernst Regehr (Uruguay), S. Floyd Pannabecker photo published in Der Bote, October 17, 1956, p. 3)

On October 27, 1948, the first group of about 750 arrived in Uruguay. They founded the El Ombú congregation in 1950. The second group of immigrants, comprising 429 persons, arrived 19 October 1951 and founded the Gartental Colony in 1952. A congregation was also organized in Montevideo the same year. The immigrants established three agricultural settlements, that have organized separate producer-consumer cooperatives. Each settlement has a school, retirement center, and a hospital-nursing home. A fourth colony, that is specialized in produce, was founded near Montevideo.

== Colonies, membership and population ==
The immigrants established three agricultural settlements that have organized separate producer-consumer cooperatives. Each settlement has a school, retirement center, and a hospital-nursing home:

- El Ombú, founded 1950
- Gartental, founded 1952
- Colonia Delta, founded 1955
- Colonia Nicolich

In 1986 the four Russian Mennonite congregations had a membership of 525. There were 507 members in the four congregations in 2003, 572 in 2009 and 607 in 2012. Altogether there were 1,457 members in 23 congregations in 2012, the majority not German speaking. Because only baptized adult members are counted, the whole Mennonite population including children is somewhat higher. A 2020 survey found that there are more than 200 Mennonite colonies in nine Latin American countries, with 3 in Uruguay.

== Customs and beliefs ==
Although Uruguayan Mennonites are relatively integrated in the mainstream society, some of them still keep their original Plautdietsch language.

== See also ==
- Germans in Uruguay
- Mennonites in the Netherlands
