= Bernabé Michelena =

Uruguayan sculptor

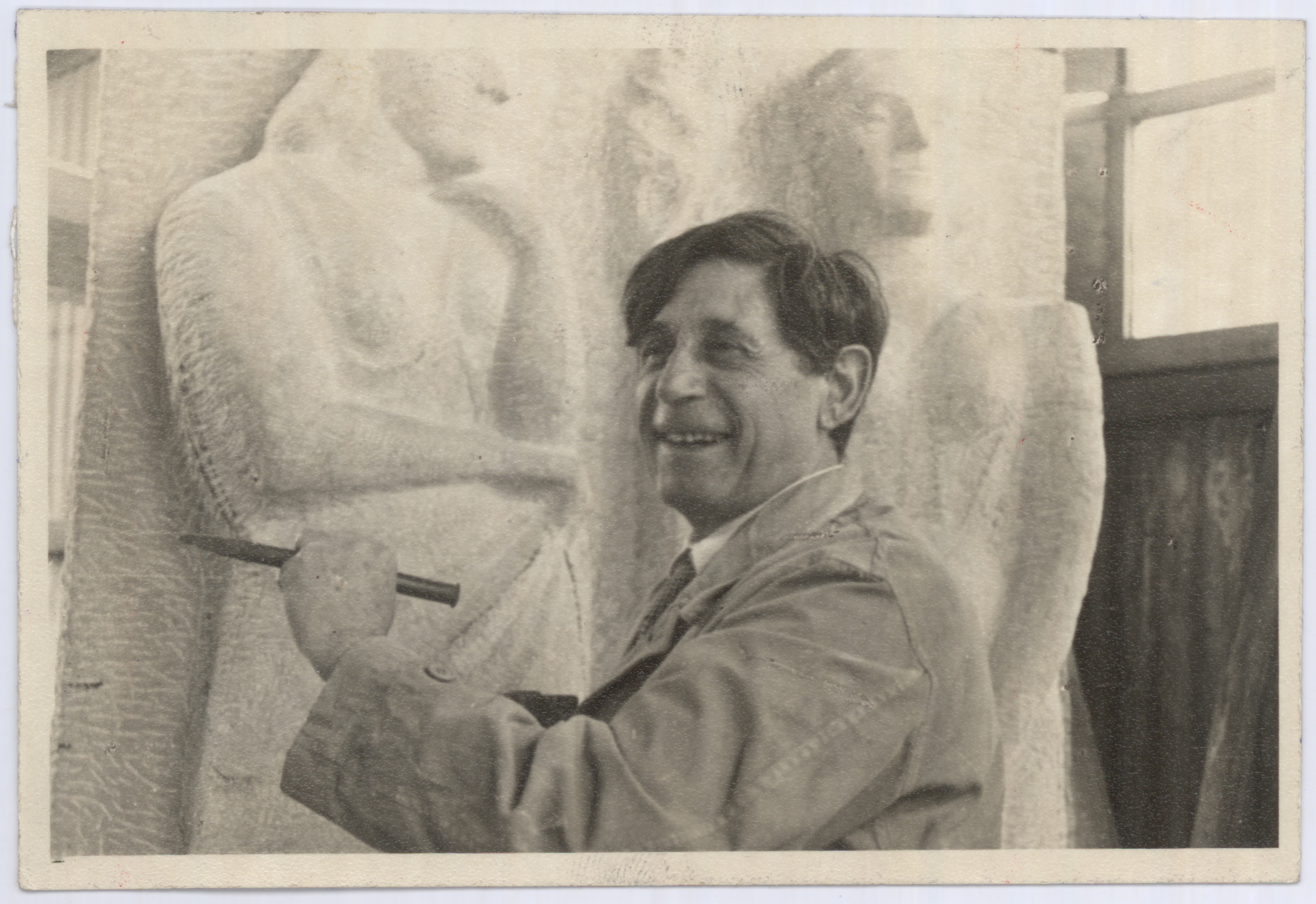
Bernabé Michelena

Bernabé Michelena Etchepare (Durazno, 13 November 1888 - Montevideo 30 June 1963) was a Uruguayan sculptor.

He was also a member of the Communist Party of Uruguay, and took part in the elections of 1958 and 1962.

== Selected works ==
- Monument to the Teacher
- Monument to Julio César Grauert
- Monument to Confraternity
