= Nibia Sabalsagaray =

- Born: Nibia Gloria Sabalsagaray Curutchet; September 10, 1949; Nueva Helvecia, Uruguay
- Died: June 29, 1974 (aged 24); Montevideo, Uruguay
- Cause of death: Murder
- Occupations: Writer; activist; teacher

Nibia Sabalsagaray (September 10, 1949 – June 29, 1974) was an Uruguayan educator and activist. She was tortured and killed by the civic-military dictatorship that ruled between 1973 and 1985.

== Biography ==
The daughter of a textile worker at the Campomar y Soulas factory in Juan Lacaze, Sabalsagaray was recognized by classmates and professors alike as a brilliant student. Professor Omar Moreira recalled that "she was so brilliant that, when a teacher was needed for a fourth-year [sophomore] class, the high school principal asked me for a name for the position and I told him that for me Nibia was the ideal person, except there was an issue; she wasn't yet 18, which meant that the Secondary Education Council gave her special permission and she became a literature teacher in Colonia Valdense at the age of 17". In 1968, she began studying Literature at the Artigas Teachers' Institute (IPA) in Montevideo where she stood out for her intelligence, creativity and social engagement. She was part of the labor-union group Renovation of the IPA Student Center (CEIPA) and joined the Union of Communist Youth (UJC) of Uruguay.

On June 24, 1974 at 2:00 am, she was arrested at her home and taken to Battalion No. 5 in Montevideo; at midday, her family was informed of her death, classed as a suicide, and was delivered her coffin with the express prohibition to open it.

The family did not respect that prohibition and Marcos Carámbula, a student of medicine six months from becoming a doctor, found multiple marks of torture on the body, and that the marks on her neck could not have been self-inflicted.

On September 8, 2004, her sister, Blanca Estela Sabalsagaray, filed a legal complaint demanding an investigation into the circumstances of Nibia’s death.

In 2005, the government of President Tabaré Vázquez placed the death of Nibia Sabalsagaray outside the reach of the Expiry Law because civilians had participated in her detention, according to the presentation her sister had made in court. The government's resolution was based on the principle that civilians are not covered by the Expiry Law, which only mentions "military and police personnel, equivalents and assimilated personnel".

In 2005, a street was named in tribute to her in her hometown of Nueva Helvecia.

On October 19, 2009, the Uruguayan Supreme Court unanimously declared the application of the Expiry Law in the case of Nibia Sabalsagaray to be unconstitutional. The judges justified the measure by arguing that the norm violated the separation of powers and that it could not be understood as an amnesty law since it was not approved according to the regulations in the Constitution.

On November 8, 2010, Judge Rolando Vomero charged General Miguel Dalmao and retired colonel José Chialanza with highly aggravated homicide over the death of Nibia Sabalsagaray.
