= Colonia Delta =

Mennonite agricultural settlement in Uruguay

Coordinates: 34°26′20″S 57°01′17″W

Colonia Delta is a Mennonite agricultural settlement in San José Department, Uruguay. It is located 97 km west of Montevideo, near the Arroyo Pavón, not far from Route 1.

Established in 1955 by Vistula delta Mennonites who came from West Prussia, Danzig and Poland to Uruguay. Its Spanish name refers to the Vistula delta.

As of 2011, it had 41 inhabitants.

== See also ==
- Mennonites in Uruguay
