= Paula Einöder =

Uruguayan poet and writer

Paula Einöder (Montevideo, 11 September 1974) is a Uruguayan poet, writer and English teacher.

== Life ==
In 2001 she graduated from the Facultad de Humanidades y Ciencias de la Educación in Uruguay with a bachelor's degree in Literature.

== Work ==
- La escritura de arcilla (2002)
- Árbol experimental (2004)
- opacidad (2010)
- árbol de arco (baladas) (2020)
- para bálsamo de ruiseñores (2021)
