= Lucía Spangenberg =

Uruguayan bioinformatician

Lucía Spangenberg is a Uruguayan bioinformatician researcher at the Pasteur Institute of Montevideo and co-founder of the biotech startup GenLives. In 2016, she was named one of the 35 Innovators Under 35 by the MIT Technology Review. She also teaches at the Catholic University of Uruguay.
