= Austrian Uruguayans =

Austrian Uruguayans Österreichischer Uruguayer
Total population
- 141 (2011 census)

Languages
- Spanish, German, Yiddish

Religion
- Christianity and Judaism

Related ethnic groups
- Austrian diaspora, Uruguayan people of European descent

Austrian Uruguayans are people born in Austria who live in Uruguay or Uruguayan-born people of Austrian descent.

== Overview ==
In the times of the Austro-Hungarian Empire diplomatic relations were established with Uruguay, with Baron Anton von Petz celebrating a Treaty of Friendship, Trade and Navigation between both countries, which enabled immigration

During the two World Wars thousands of Austrians escaped Europe, most of them fleeing to South America, including a small but significant Austrian-Jewish community. The Central Austrian Committee for Latin America was established in Montevideo in 1943.

The 2011 Uruguayan census revealed 141 people who declared Austria as their country of birth.

There are some members of the Austrian nobility in Uruguay, such as the Habsburgs and the Auerspergs.

There is an institution, the Alpine Club Montevideo (German: Alpenländer Verein Montevideo), which was established in 1934 by Austrians and Germans.

== Notable Austrian Uruguayans ==
- Nelly Weissel (1920–2010), actress
- Carlos Kalmar (born 1958), conductor
- Guntram of Habsburg-Lorraine (born 1967), Prince of Tuscany, son of Princess Laetitia d'Arenberg.
- Fernanda Auersperg (born 1971), accountant and politician.

== See also ==
- Austria–Uruguay relations
- Immigration to Uruguay
- German Uruguayans
- Hungarians in Uruguay
- Swiss Uruguayans
