= Siegbert Rippe =

Siegbert Rippe (born 23 May 1936 in Montevideo) is a Uruguayan lawyer and jurist.

He specialized in commercial law.

He has presided over the Uruguayan Court of Audit since July 2010.
