= El Ombú =

Agricultural settlement in Uruguay

- Agricultural settlement
- Interactive map of El Ombú
- Coordinates: 32°51′25″S 57°27′17″W
- Country: Uruguay
- Department: Río Negro
- Founded: 1950
- Named for: Phytolacca dioica tree
- Website: www.elombu.com.uy

El Ombú is a Mennonite agricultural settlement in Río Negro Department, Uruguay. It is located 284 km NW of Montevideo and 29 km SE of Young, near the Route 3.

Established in 1950 by Vistula delta Mennonites who came from West Prussia, Danzig and Poland, it was the first Mennonite settlement on Uruguayan territory. It takes its name from the most popular native tree in Uruguay, ombú (Phytolacca dioica).

Previously the area had a German school, Deutsche Schule El-Ombu.

== See also ==
- Gartental
- Mennonites in Uruguay
