= Mariví Ugolino =

Uruguayan sculptor (1943-2024)

Mariví Ugolino (December 15, 1943– November 5, 2024) was a Uruguayan sculptor, researcher and teacher.She was born in Salto, Uruguay and died in Atlántida, Canelones, Uruguay.
