= Colonia Nicolich =

General Seregni Colonia Nicolich
- Town
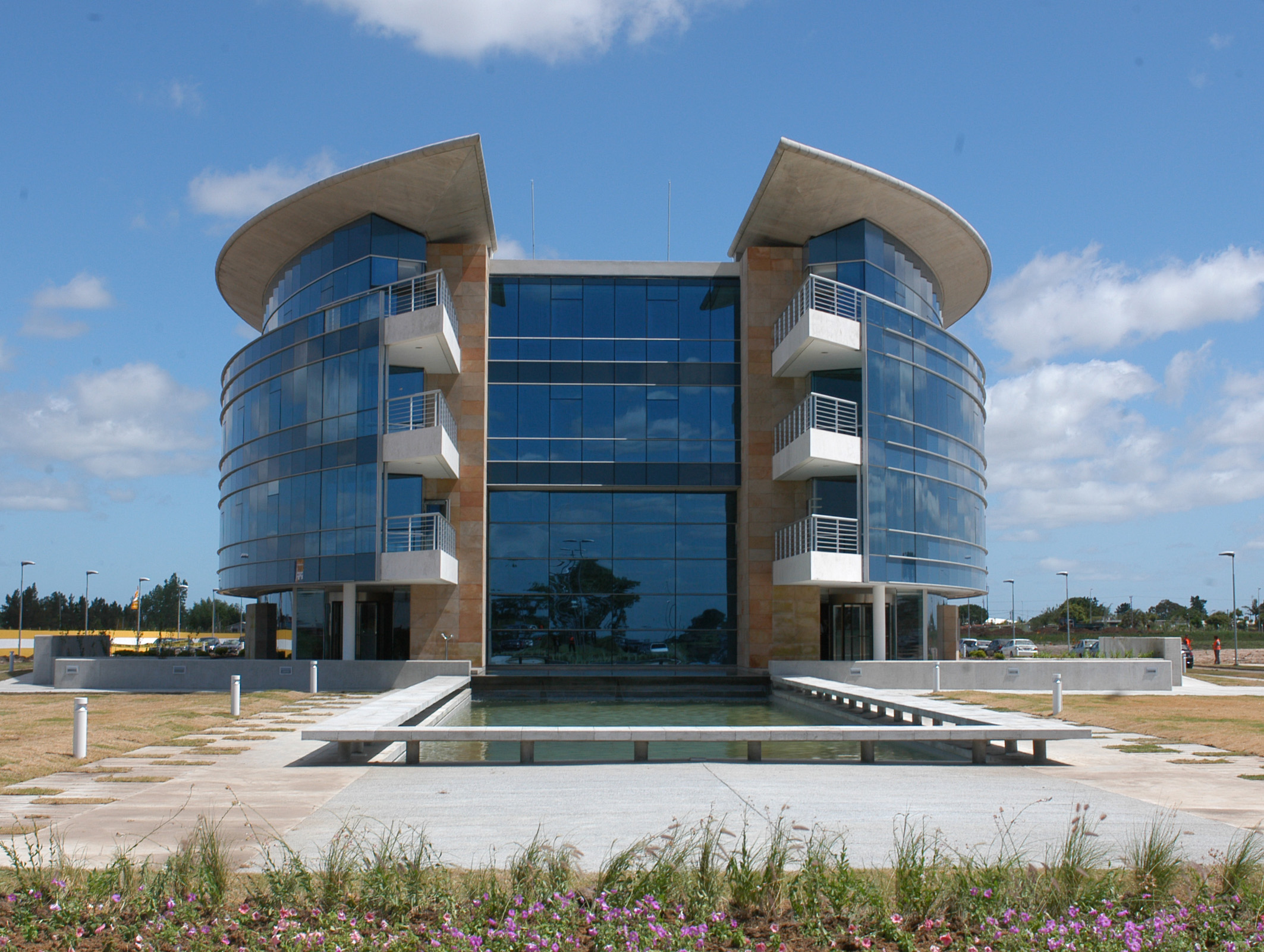

- Location in Uruguay
- Coordinates: 34°49′0″S 56°1′0″W
- Country: Uruguay
- Department: Canelones Department

Population (2011)
  - Total: 9,624
- Time zone: UTC -3
- Postal code: 14000
- Dial plan: +598 2 (+7 digits)

General Seregni, formerly Colonia Nicolich, is a town in the Canelones Department of southern Uruguay.

Colonia Nicolich is also the name of the municipality to which the town belongs and which includes the areas Colinas de Carrasco (Empalme) and Villa Aeroparque.

== Geography ==
The town is located directly north and northeast of the Carrasco International Airport on Route 102. It is part of the wider metropolitan area of Montevideo.

== History ==
Since the 19th century, the area has been characterized by intensive agriculture supplying the markets of Montevideo. In the 1940s a slow urbanization started taking place. The urbanization was accelerated in the 1970s making it part of the metropolitan area of Montevideo. This included the construction of housing complexes for the Air Force personnel serving at nearby Air Base N1 and for those studying at the also nearby Aeronautic Military School. Other settlements were added in the 1990s. Today Colonia Nicolich is considered a typical "dormitory town" for people who commute daily to Montevideo for work or business.

In the mid-20th century a Mennonite colony was established there.

Since 1999 there is a private cemetery nearby, Parque Martinelli de Carrasco.

== Population ==
In 2011 Colonia Nicolich had a population of 9,624. The Intendencia de Canelones had estimated a population of 13,757 for the municipality, based on the 2004 census.

Year	Population
1963	2,669
1975	4,500
1985	5,527
1996	7,223
2004	8,811
2011	9,624

Source: Instituto Nacional de Estadística de Uruguay

== Places of worship ==
- Parish Church of St. Francis of Assisi (Roman Catholic)
