= Luís de Meneses, 2nd Viscount of Meneses =

His Lordship The Viscount of Meneses CvTE ComNSC
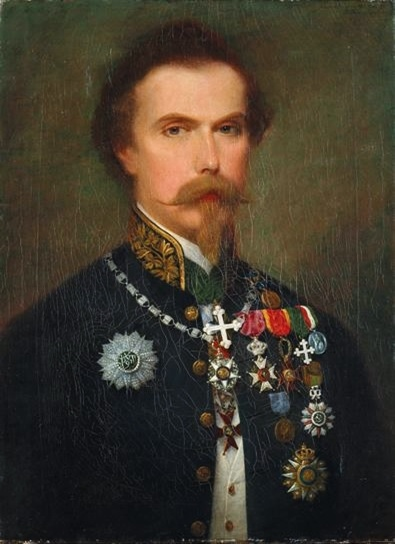
- Born: April 4, 1817; Porto, Portugal
- Died: May 5, 1878 (aged 61); Lisbon, Portugal
- Occupation: Portraitist

D. Luís de Miranda Pereira Henriques de Meneses, 2nd Viscount of Meneses (Note: Also rendered as Menezes, as it was usually spelt in the 19th century.) CvTE ComNSC (4 April 1817 – 5 May 1878) was a notable Romantic artist from Portugal, particularly celebrated for his portraits of elegant society.

== Biography ==
The son of the Viscounts of Meneses, D. José António de Miranda Pereira de Meneses and his wife D. Elisa Eugénia Edwards de Desanges, he showed great potential for art since a young age. At age 16, he joined the Army, fighting for Queen Maria II during the Siege of Porto. In 1834, he moved to Lisbon, where he was initially tutored by a French master; he was then taught by António Manuel da Fonseca, and attended the newly-created Royal Academy of Fine Arts.

Disillusioned with academic teaching, he left with Francisco Augusto Metrass for Italy in 1844, sponsored by his father. In Rome, he was a disciple of Johann Friedrich Overbeck. Later in the 1840s, he travelled to France, Belgium, Holland, and England. In London, he contacted with the Pre-Raphaelites, and was artistically influenced by the portraits of Reynolds, Gainsborough, and Lawrence, as well as those of Rigaud and Winterhalter. He returned to Lisbon, with Metrass, in 1850: eager to elicit change in the Portuguese artistic scene, they organised an art exhibition that introduced Romanticism in portraiture to Portugal.

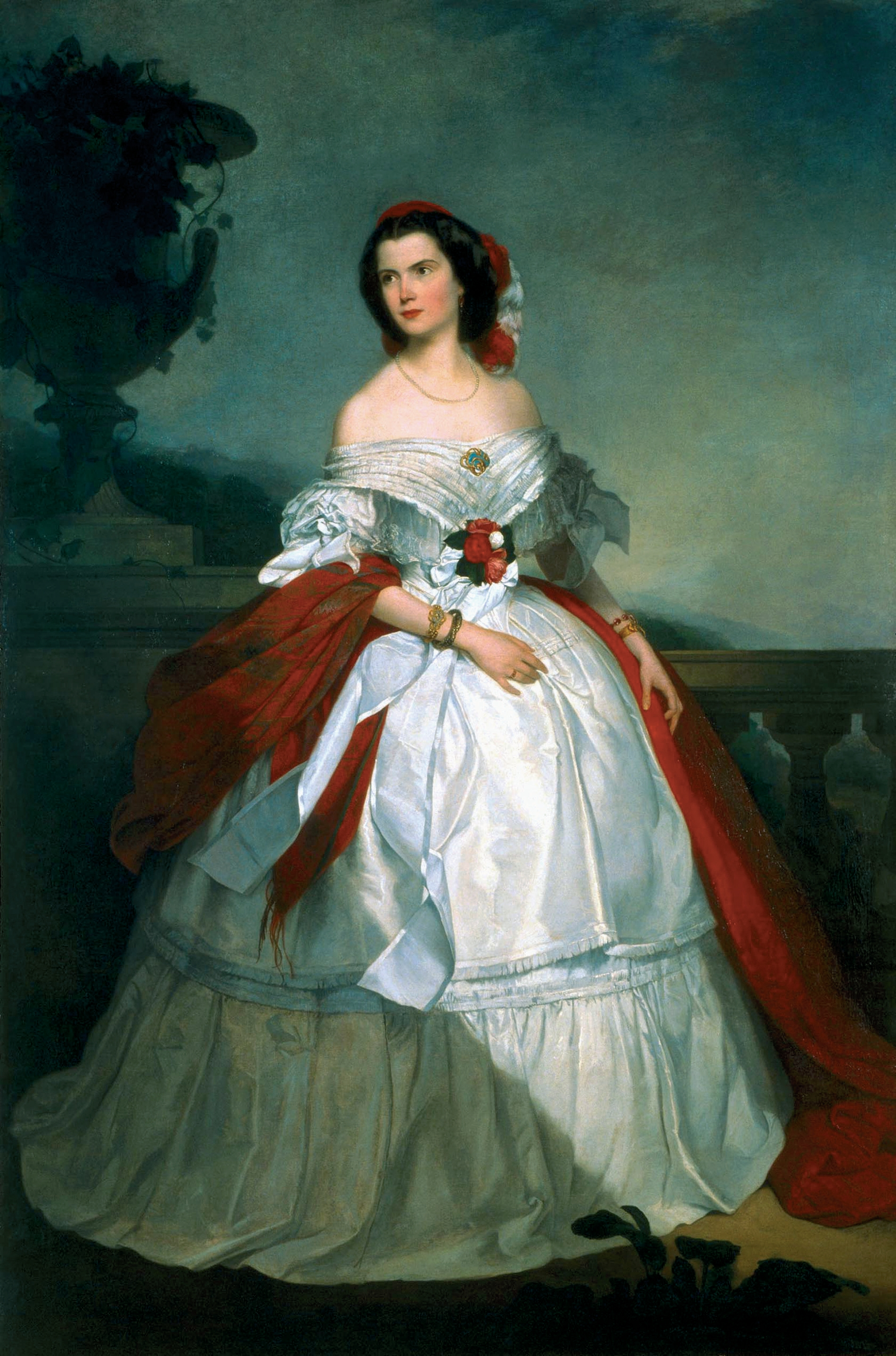
Portrait of the Viscountess of Meneses (1862)

In 1853, following the death of his father, he became the 2nd Viscount of Meneses (the title was renewed by royal decree on 14 December 1853). On 8 May 1858, he married Carlota Emília de Mac-Mahon Pereira Guimarães, the daughter of Francisco Pereira Guimarães, a judge in the Supreme Council of Military Justice (Supremo Conselho de Justiça Militar).

In 1860, he was a founding member and vice-president of the Society for the Promotion of Fine Arts (Sociedade Promotora de Belas Artes). In 1862, he painted a remarkable portrait of his wife, currently in the National Museum of Contemporary Art and, later, in c. 1878, a portrait of the eldest of their two daughters, Elisa Wilfrida, currently in the Soares dos Reis National Museum.

He and his wife had two daughters and several grandchildren, including the Uruguayan political figures Julio César Grauert and Héctor Grauert.
