= Mariana Meerhoff =

Uruguayan researcher (born 1975)

- Born: 17 June 1975 (age 51); Montevideo, Uruguay
- Education: Aarhus University
- Occupations: Researcher, professor, biologist
- Years active: 1994 – present
- Awards: L'Oréal-UNESCO Award (2011)

Mariana Meerhoff (born 17 June 1975) is a Uruguayan researcher and Full Professor at the University Center of the Eastern Region of the University of the Republic (UdelaR). She is also honorary associate researcher at Aarhus University and a member of the Advisory Board of the South American Institute for Research and Education in the Sustainability and Resilience Sciences (SARAS). Likewise, she works as a Level 5 Full Professor of the Basic Sciences Development Program (PEDECIBA), and is a Level 3 Researcher of the Sistema Nacional de Investigadores of the National Research and Innovation Agency (SNI, ANII) of Uruguay. She currently has more than 90 publications of scientific articles in peer-reviewed journals. In 2011 she was recognized with the L'Oréal-UNESCO Award for Women in Science for the project "Ecosystem functioning in water bodies: effects of the degree of impact and the opening of the ecosystem". In 2015 she received the International Recognition of Professional Excellence in Limnology (IRPE) and the national Roberto Caldeyro Barcia-PEDECIBA Award.

== Academic career ==
At age 18 (in 1994), Mariana Meerhoff entered the University of the Republic's Faculty of Sciences for a Bachelor of Biological Sciences program, which she completed in 1998 with a focus in ecology. Between 1999 and 2001, she completed a master's degree in Biological Sciences (PEDECIBA, UdelaR) tutored by Dr. Néstor Mazzeo and Dr. Brian Moss, with a thesis entitled Effect of the presence of hydrophytes on the structure of the zooplankton and fish communities in a shallow hyper-utrophic lake. In 2003 she began her PhD in Sciences at Aarhus University in Denmark, directed by Dr. Erik Jeppesen and Dr. Tom V. Madsen, which ended in 2006. Her thesis was entitled The structuring role of macrophytes on trophic dynamics of shallow lakes under a climate warming scenario. In 2010 she obtained her post-doctorate in cooperation between Uruguay and Denmark. In that same year, she became associate professor at the University Center of the Eastern Region, entering the Total Dedication Regime.

== Awards and recognitions ==
- 2011, winner of the L'Oréal-UNESCO Award for Women in Science
- 2015, winner of the International Recognition of Professional Excellence in Limnology
- 2015, winner of the Roberto Caldeyro Barcia-PEDECIBA Award

== Publications ==
- Beklioğlu, M., Meerhoff, M., Davidson, T.A., Ger, K.A., Havens, K. and Moss, B., 2016. "Preface: Shallow lakes in a fast changing world". Hydrobiologia, 778 (1), pp. 9–11
- Jeppesen, E., Meerhoff, M., Davidson, T.A., Trolle, D., SondergaarD, M., Lauridsen, T.L., Beklioglu, M., Brucet Balmaña, S., Volta, P., González-Bergonzoni, I. and Nielsen, A., 2014. "Climate change impacts on lakes: an integrated ecological perspective based on a multi-faceted approach, with special focus on shallow lakes"
- Meerhoff, M., Teixeira-de Mello, F., Kruk, C., Alonso, C., Bergonzoni, I.G., Pacheco, J.P., Lacerot, G., Arim, M., Beklioglu, M., Balmana, S.B. and Goyenola, G., 2012. "Environmental warming in shallow lakes: a review of potential changes in community structure as evidenced from space-for-time substitution approaches". Advances in Ecological Research
- González-Bergonzoni, I., Meerhoff, M., Davidson, T.A., Teixeira-de Mello, F., Baattrup-Pedersen, A. and Jeppesen, E., 2012. "Meta-analysis shows a consistent and strong latitudinal pattern in fish omnivory across ecosystems". Ecosystems, 15 (3), pp. 492–503
- Jeppesen, E., Kronvang, B., Olesen, J.E., Audet, J., Søndergaard, M., Hoffmann, C.C., Andersen, H.E., Lauridsen, T.L., Liboriussen, L., Larsen, S.E. and Beklioglu, M., 2011. "Climate change effects on nitrogen loading from cultivated catchments in Europe: implications for nitrogen retention, ecological state of lakes and adaptation". Hydrobiologia, 663 (1), pp. 1–21
- Jeppesen, E., Meerhoff, M., Holmgren, K., González-Bergonzoni, I., Teixeira-de Mello, F., Declerck, S.A., De Meester, L., Søndergaard, M., Lauridsen, T.L., Bjerring, R. and Conde-Porcuna, J.M., 2010. "Impacts of climate warming on lake fish community structure and potential effects on ecosystem function". Hydrobiologia, 646 (1), pp. 73–90
- Meerhoff, M. and Jeppesen, E., 2009. "Shallow lakes and ponds". In Encyclopedia of Inland Waters. Pergamon Press
- Jeppesen, E., Kronvang, B., Meerhoff, M., Søndergaard, M., Hansen, K.M., Andersen, H.E., Lauridsen, T.L., Liboriussen, L., Beklioglu, M., Özen, A. and Olesen, J.E., 2009. "Climate change effects on runoff, catchment phosphorus loading and lake ecological state, and potential adaptations". Journal of Environmental Quality, 38 (5), pp. 1930–1941
- Jeppesen, E., Søndergaard, M., Meerhoff, M., Lauridsen, T.L. and Jensen, J.P., 2007. "Shallow lake restoration by nutrient loading reduction—some recent findings and challenges ahead". Hydrobiologia, 584 (1), pp. 239–252
- Meerhoff, M., Clemente, J.M., Mello, D., Teixeira, F., Iglesias, C., Pedersen, A.R. and Jeppesen, E., 2007. "Can warm climate-related structure of littoral predator assemblies weaken the clear water state in shallow lakes?". Global Change Biology, 13 (9), pp. 1888–1897
- Meerhoff, M., Iglesias, C., De Mello, F.T., Clemente, J.M., Jensen, E., Lauridsen, T.L. and Jeppesen, E., 2007. "Effects of habitat complexity on community structure and predator avoidance behaviour of littoral zooplankton in temperate versus subtropical shallow lakes". Freshwater Biology, 52 (6), pp. 1009–1021
- Meerhoff, M., 2006. The structuring role of macrophytes on trophic dynamics in shallow lakes under a climate-warming scenario (doctoral dissertation, Aarhus University, Science and Technology, Department of Bioscience-Lake Ecology)
- Meerhoff, M., Fosalba, C., Bruzzone, C., Mazzeo, N., Noordoven, W. and Jeppesen, E., 2006. "An experimental study of habitat choice by Daphnia: plants signal danger more than refuge in subtropical lakes". Freshwater Biology, 51 (7), pp. 1320–1330
- Jeppesen, E., Søndergaard, M., Mazzeo, N., Meerhoff, M., Branco, C.C., Huszar, V. and Scasso, F., 2005. "Lake restoration and biomanipulation in temperate lakes: relevance for subtropical and tropical lakes". Restoration and Management of Tropical Eutrophic Lakes, pp. 341–359
- Meerhoff, M. and Mazzeo, N., 2004. "Importancia de las plantas flotantes libres de gran porte en la conservación y rehabilitación de lagos someros de Sudamérica". Revista Ecosistemas, 13 (2)
- Meerhoff, M., Mazzeo, N., Moss, B. and Rodríguez-Gallego, L., 2003. "The structuring role of free-floating versus submerged plants in a subtropical shallow lake". Aquatic Ecology, 37 (4), pp. 377–391
