= La diaria =

Uruguayan newspaper

la diaria
- Type: Daily newspaper (Monday through Saturday)
- Founded: 20 March 2006
- Political alignment: Political left
- Headquarters: Montevideo, Uruguay
- Website: la diaria

la diaria (transl. "The Daily Happening") is a Uruguayan newspaper established in 2006. It is aligned with the independent left.

== See also ==
- Brecha (newspaper)
- Marcha (newspaper)
