= Gartental =

Coordinates: 32°41′45″S 57°59′00″W

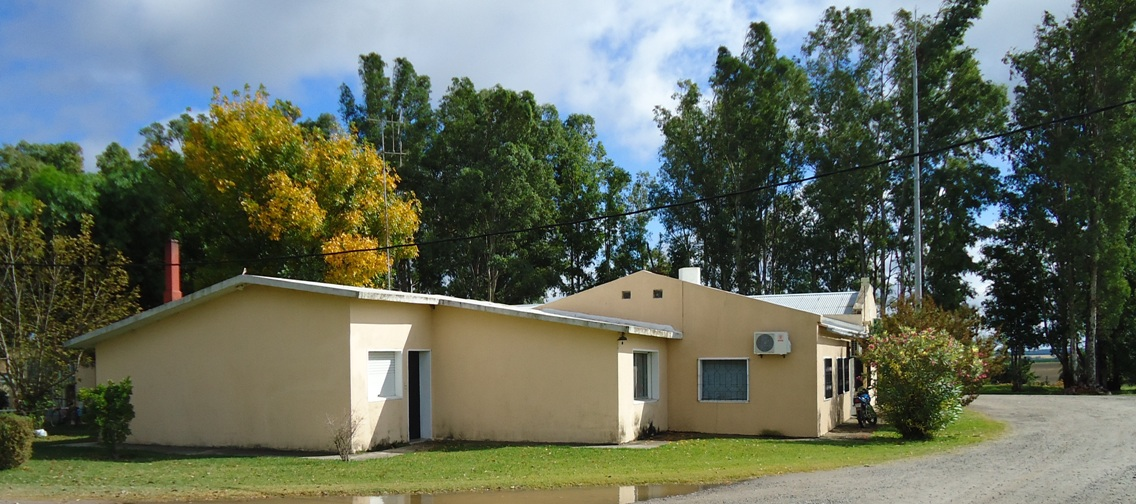
house in Gartental, 2010

Gartental is a Mennonite agricultural settlement in Río Negro Department, Uruguay. It is located 360 km (220 mi) NW of Montevideo, near San Javier, not far from Route 24.

Established in 1951 by Vistula delta Mennonites who came from West Prussia, Danzig and Poland to Uruguay. Its German name means "garden valley".

Previously the area had a German school, Deutsche Schule Gartental.

== See also ==
- El Ombú
- Mennonites in Uruguay
