= Julio César Grauert =

Uruguayan journalist and political figure

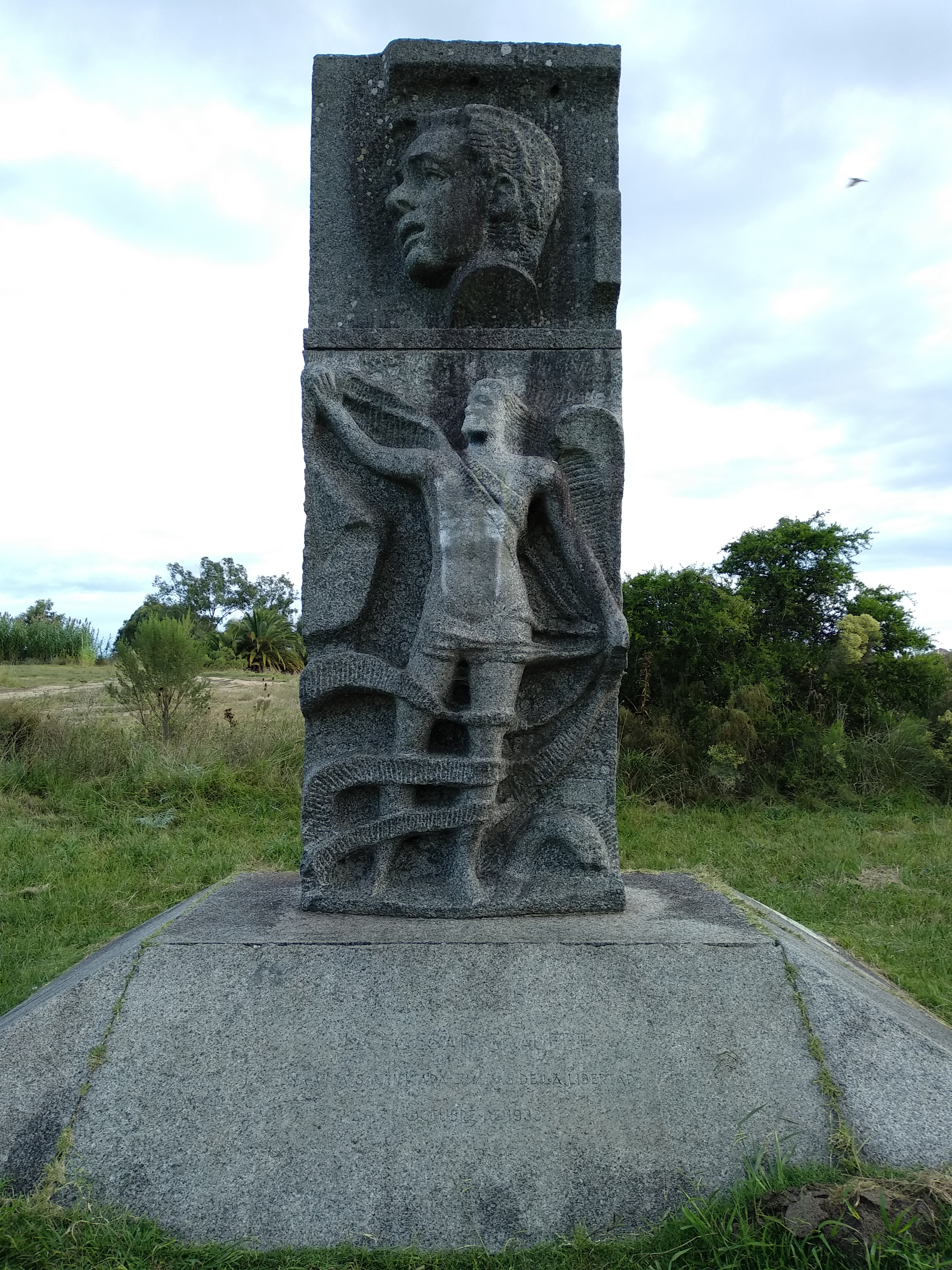
Monument to Julio César Grauert, by Bernabé Michelena.

Julio César Grauert (1902–1933) was a Uruguayan journalist and political figure.

== Background ==
Julio César Grauert was the son of Julio Luis Grauert Meneses (maternal grandson of the Portuguese artist Luís de Meneses, 2nd Viscount of Meneses) and Fermina Ferrer. He was a lawyer by profession. His brother Héctor Grauert (1907–1991) was active in politics.

== Public office ==
A member of the Uruguayan Colorado Party, he was elected a deputy in 1929.

== Death ==
He died in a confrontation with the security forces in 1933, during the presidency of Gabriel Terra.

== See also ==
- Politics of Uruguay
- List of political families § Uruguay
