= Héctor Grauert =

Uruguayan political figure

Héctor Grauert (1907–1991) was a Uruguayan political figure.

== Background ==
Héctor Grauert was the son of Julio Luis Grauert Meneses (maternal grandson of the Portuguese artist Luís de Meneses, 2nd Viscount of Meneses) and Fermina Ferrer. He was a lawyer by profession. His brother Julio César Grauert was a Colorado Party Deputy.

== Public offices ==
He was elected a Deputy in 1942 and subsequently a Senator.

He served as Interior Minister and in other ministries in the 1950s.

In the early 1960s he served as minority member at the National Council of Government (Uruguay).

== See also ==
- Politics of Uruguay
- List of political families
