= The British Cemetery Montevideo =

Cemetery in Uruguay

The British Cemetery Cementerio Británico
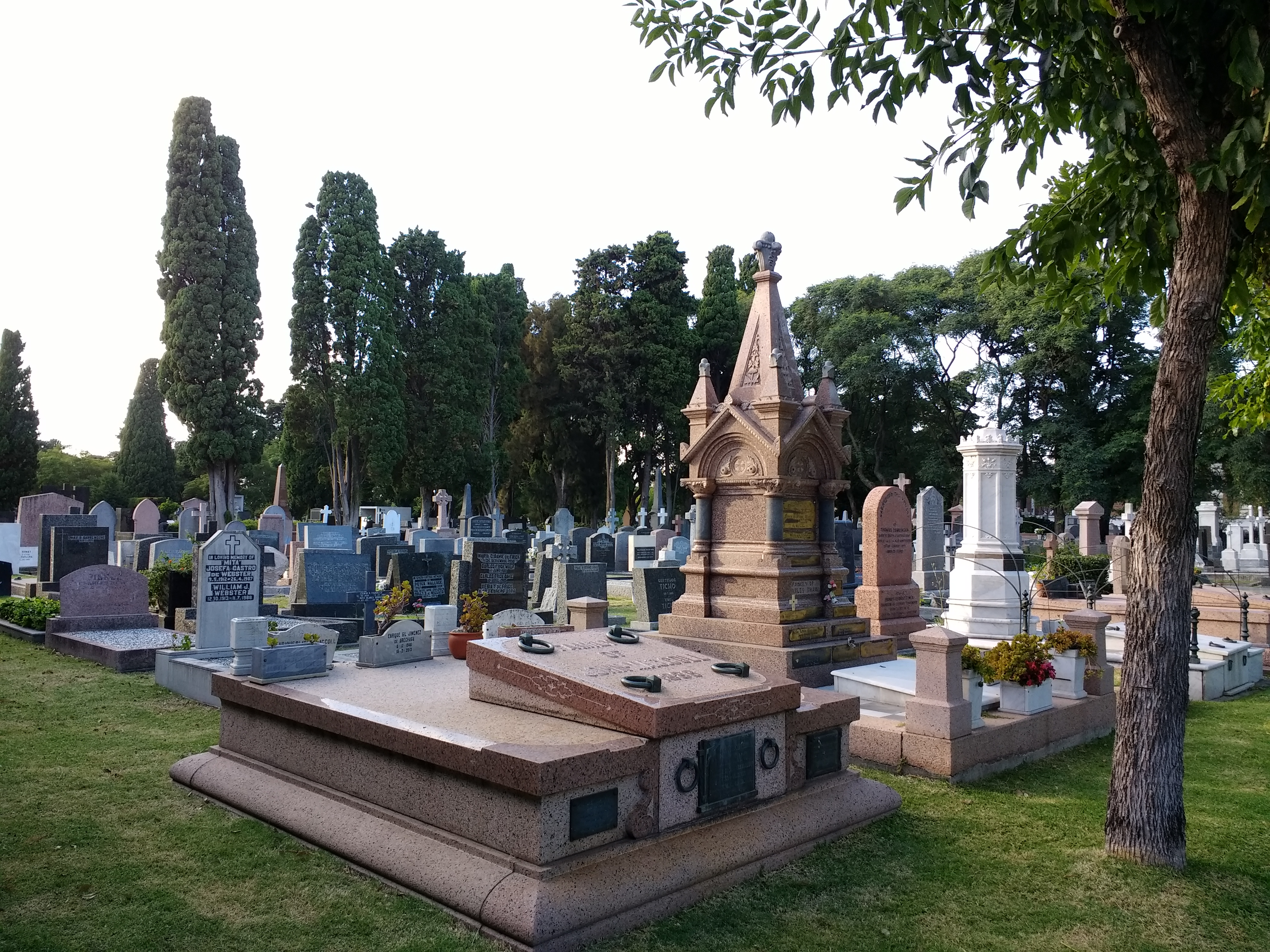
- Interactive map of The British Cemetery; Cementerio Británico

Details
- Established: 1828
- Location: Montevideo
- Country: Uruguay
- Coordinates: 34°54′02″S 56°07′45″W
- Type: private
- Website: Website

The British Cemetery of Montevideo (Spanish: Cementerio Británico) is one of the oldest operating cemeteries in Uruguay.

== History ==
This land, now on Central Avenue, was known as the Cementerio de los Ingleses as during the failed British invasions of the River Plate a battle took place there on 20 January 1807, known as the Battle of Cardal, against forces of Vazquez Feijoo and where several British soldiers were killed. Their comrades buried their bodies on the land on which they had fallen. Shortly afterwards on 3 February, the Battle of Montevideo and for one month the city was occupied by the British till they were defeated in Buenos Aires and had to definitively withdraw from the Viceroyalty of the Río de la Plata.

On 24 October 1818 a Portuguese resident of the Cordon area of Montevideo, Padre don Manuel Salinas took possession of a piece of "unoccupied" land situated in the centre of the city on the site of the present "Intendencia", that was donated to him, during the occupation of Montevideo by the Portuguese Government, by the then Governor Lecor, Viscount of Laguna. On 30 September 1825 Padre Salinas sold and transferred the land to a British resident, John Hall, for the sum of $400. On 14 April 1828 the British Consul in Montevideo, Mr Thomas Hood bought the land from John Hall in the name of the British government, and it is from this date that the British Cemetery became more formally recognised.

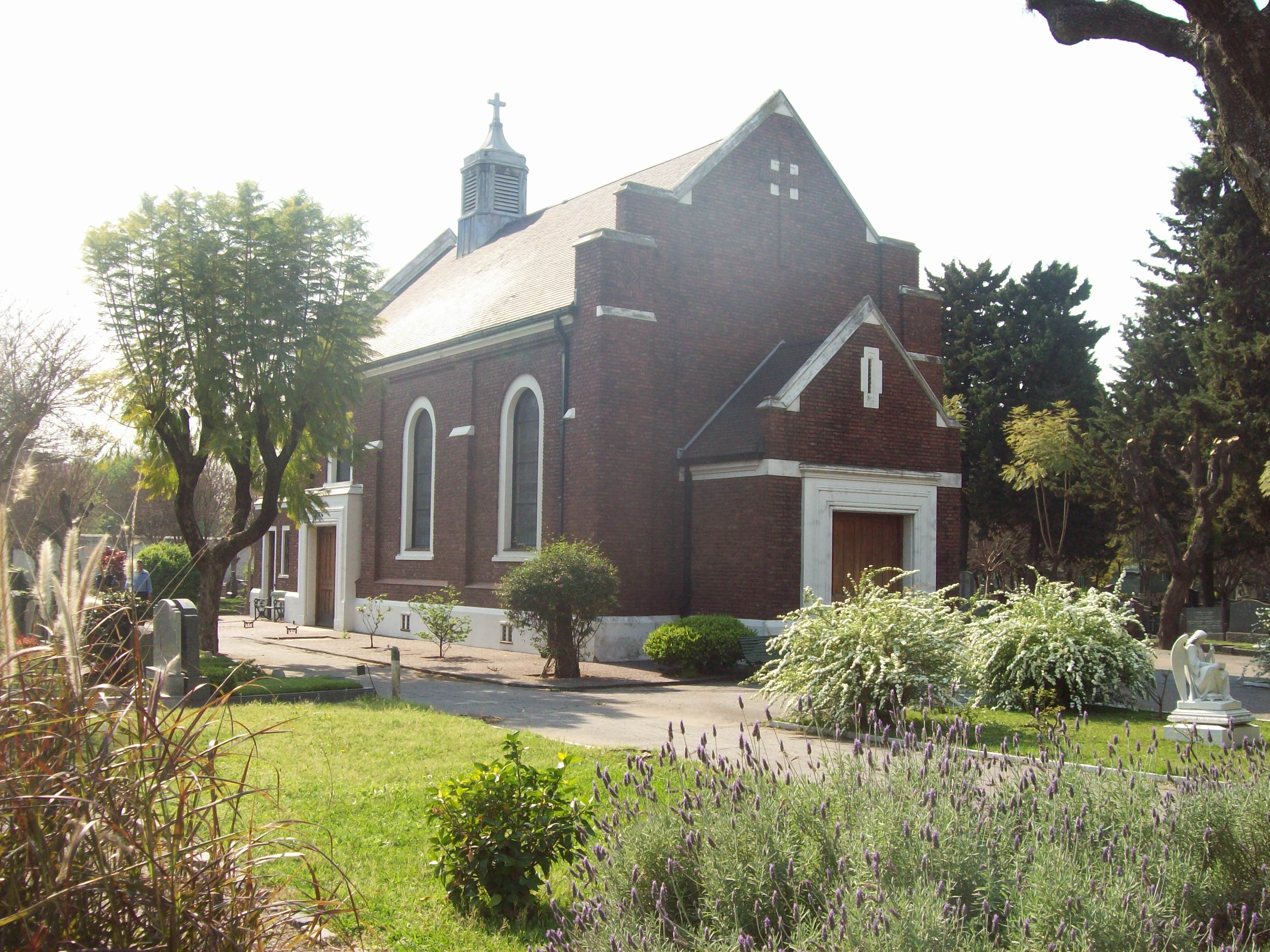
Chapel of the British Cemetery

This cemetery initially was a Protestant cemetery according to the first entrance books, that being the main reason why so many Germans were buried in the original cemetery. In 1835 a German citizen by the name of Enrique Jakobsen died in San Jose, and was denied burial there on account of being a freemason and a heretic. His body was brought to Montevideo, and was also initially denied burial for the same reason. At that time all cemeteries were under the sole management and control of the Catholic Church. After his burial in the Cementerio Central which had been inaugurated earlier the same year the First Bishop of Montevideo, Jacinto Vera declared that no other burial could take place in that Cemetery until the body was removed. Because of this the Government stepped in, and on 10 October 1835 passed a decree whereby all cemeteries in this country would come under the direct influence of the Jefatura de Policia. Subsequent to this decree, years later, by Government decree of 28 June 1858 the administration of all cemeteries of this country was conferred on the Juntas Economicas Administrativas who depended directly from the Municipios. On 3 October 1837 the title deeds were issued to Mr. Hood with the provision that the land should be used exclusively for the burial of British subjects. Within a context of religious intolerance the Uruguayan Government requested that Protestants of other nationalities should also be buried there, and as can be seen from the record books this has always been respected. The British Cemetery has no restrictions regarding religion or nationality.

On 1 January 1879 a decree was passed prohibiting burials within the Cemetery, with a few exceptions due to an outbreak of Yellow Fever. On 1 October 1884 the President of the Republic, General Máximo Santos, had a decree passed to finally close the Old Cemetery and the Government made a Compulsory Purchase of the land. Anticipating this possibility, in August 1878 a piece of land was bought next to the Buceo Cemetery (which had been inaugurated on 20 March 1872) for the purpose of opening a Cemetery in this new location. In 1885 the gardens and paths were designed and constructed inside the walls of the New Cemetery, a house for the caretaker, offices, stables, a shed for the workers, and the chapel. Any improvements or maintenance that has been done to these installations over the years has respected the original designs, and today all of these buildings still stand as fine examples of late 19th century architecture. On 14 October a dedication ceremony was carried out in the newly constructed Chapel by the Right Reverend Waite Hockin Stirling who was the Lord Bishop of the Falkland Islands.

In 1888 the railings and a water well were constructed. The first Burial in the New British Cemetery was that of a German citizen by the name of Nicolas Laukant on 9 April 1885. Cristian Schenzer, who was the caretaker of the Cemetery at the time, was contracted to carry out the onerous task of transferring the remains of bodies interred in the old cemetery and their corresponding monuments to the new site. This was done between 13 October 1887 and 4 February 1888.

In the year 1897 the British Community decided to build a community hall and as a way of commemorating her Diamond Jubilee it was named after Queen Victoria. The Victoria Hall Society was formed, and after obtaining a loan from the British Cemetery Society, a very suitable piece of land in calle Rio Negro was purchased, where the building was finally erected. The drive for funds for its construction was very small, and payments had to be made during the construction of the building, so that continuous loans had to be granted by the Cemetery Society, until such time as the building was finished. The so-called Victoria Hall Society could not even meet the payment of interest on the total loan, so finally an agreement was reached whereby the property was transferred to the British Cemetery Society. In this building, with a private entrance, the Acacia Lodge Temple was constructed, and the Acacia Lodge obtained a loan from the British Cemetery Society to import from the United Kingdom the furniture required for the Masonic Temple. When all the public utility companies, such as railways, waterworks, tramways etc. passed into the hands of the Government, the general idea was that there would no longer be any British Community. No use was made of the Victoria Hall; it was partly kept by the rent obtained from leasing it for weekend dances and theatre. Expenses, management, repairs, taxes etc. had to be paid by the British Cemetery Society with yearly losses, and as finally the community was no longer using the hall, decision was taken to sell it.

Upon the death of Queen Victoria, on 22 January 1901, the British Community in Uruguay decided to raise funds to build a monument in her honour. F. Pozer & Company constructed an obelisk with grey granite from the hills near Minas, 8 metres high, with the inscription "Victoria, Queen and Mother of her People". The monument was inaugurated at 3pm on Sunday 10 August 1902. The ceremony was led by the Walter Baring – British Minister & Consul General at Montevideo, Reverend Basil Cobbett and the President of the British Society W. Galway accompanied by 6 sailors from HMS Basilisk. The monument still stands in its original position within the entrance to the Cemetery.

At a meeting of the British Cemeteries Society held on 13 February 1908, Mr. J.J. Hore, then Honorary Treasurer of the Society, brought forward a scheme for the establishing of a British School in Montevideo, for those children whose parents could not afford to send them for their education abroad. The proposal was eventually carried through, and the then Rector of the Anglican Church, Rev. Alpass, who had educational experience, was instructed that whilst in England he should obtain the services of a headmaster and teacher for the projected school. He was also instructed to purchase the required furniture and books for the school. Apart from paying Assisted Education for various children once the School was installed in calle Salsipuedes (now Blanes), the British Cemetery Society made the School a grant of $5,000 for a period of three years, and that it should be continued until such time that the school could pay its own way. When the School moved from calle Blanes to 18 de Julio continued assistance was granted. From there the British School decided to build their own property, and in this respect purchased land in Pocitos, where the School was built. Edward, the Prince of Wales laid the Foundation Stone in 1925. The Cemetery Society guaranteed and paid all the mortgage interest on the property built in Jose B. Lamas, on the condition that on the Board of the British Schools Society there should always be two members of the British Cemetery Society until such time as the final payment of the mortgage on the property had been made.

During 1910 the British Hospital decided to vacate their old premises on the street Juan Lindolfo Cuestas, and build a new hospital in Avenida Aldea (now Avenida Italia), where it stands today, and known as the Edward VII Hospital. The total investment for the construction was $60000, and it was made out in debentures. The British Cemetery Society had to guarantee the 6% interest on these debentures. As the British Community could not meet the total $60000, the British Cemetery Society had to absorb one third. Also, some years later, when the extension to the Edward VII Hospital was made, of what were called the new wings, the British Cemetery Society granted a further loan, which covered 40% of this construction at a low interest rate.

In the year 1945 when practically all the British public utility works were sold to the Uruguayan Government the then Presidents of the various British Societies together with their committees decided to sell out, as they thought that it could be the end of a British Community in this country. Consequently, the Victoria Hall, the Old English Club and Montevideo Cricket Club sold out.

In accordance with the statutes of the Society, at the end of every financial year, if there is a profit in the running of the Society the same is disbursed amongst medical entities.

== Types of crosses ==
Distinct styles of monuments are to be found within the Cemetery, reflecting the wide variety of nationalities and religious groups which are represented.

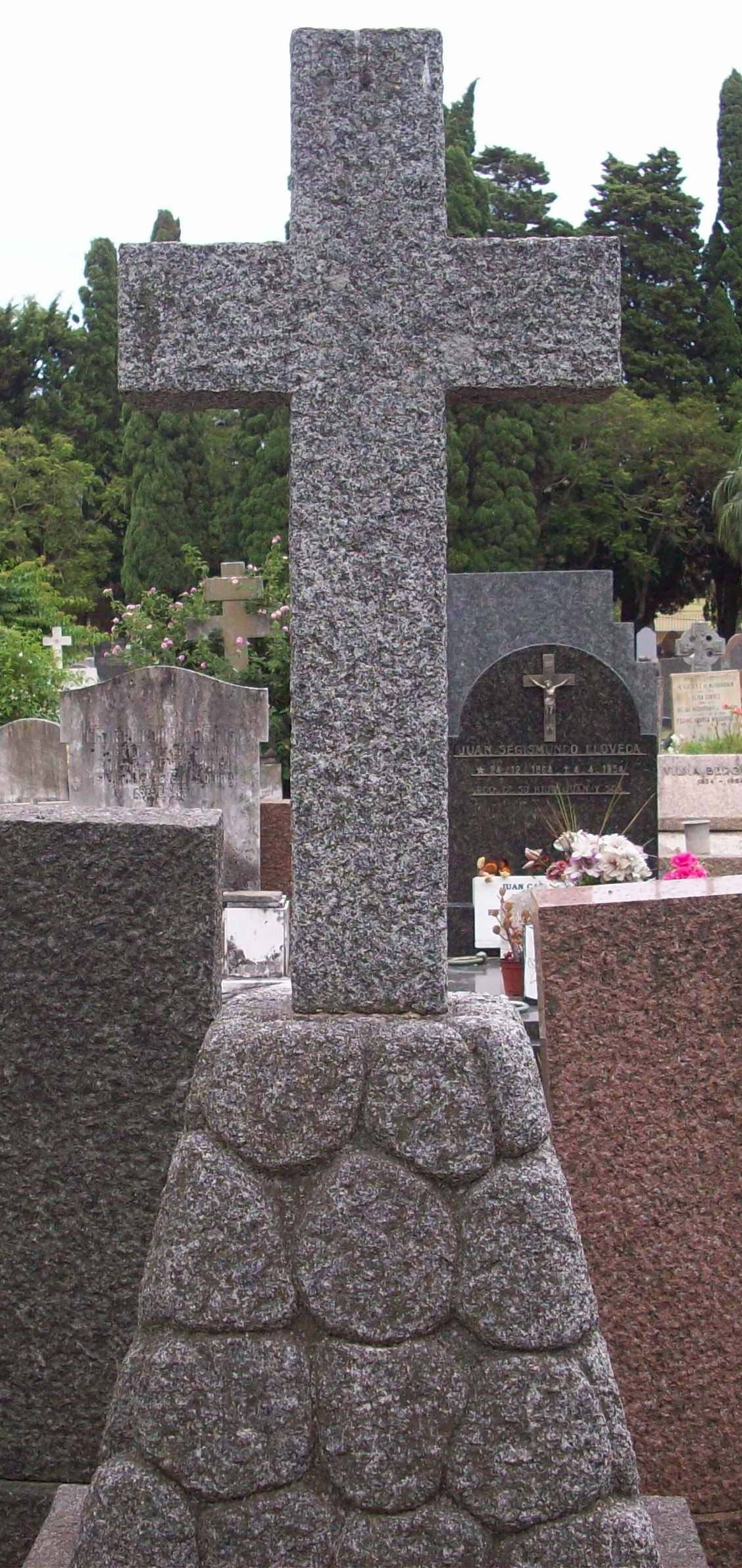
Latin Cross

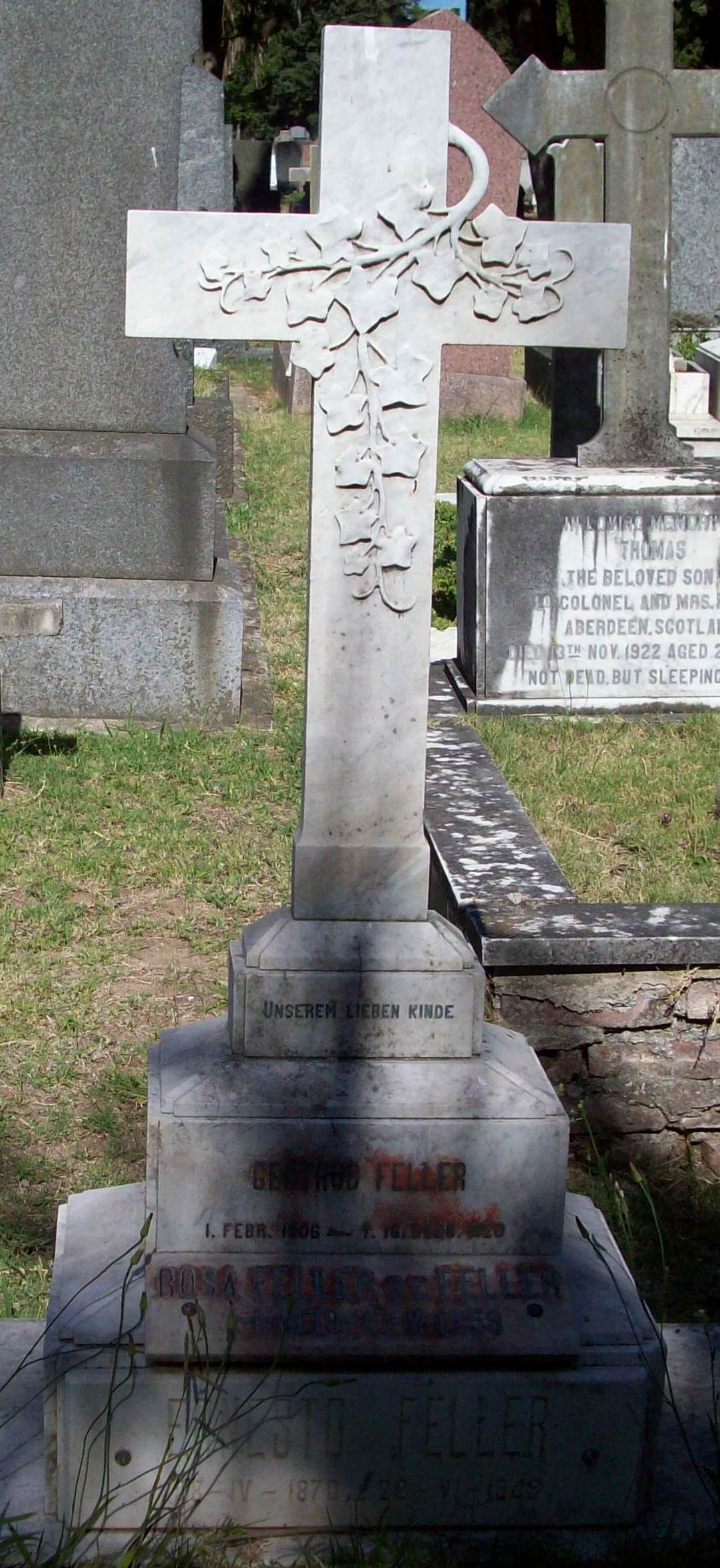
Latin Cross, with lilies

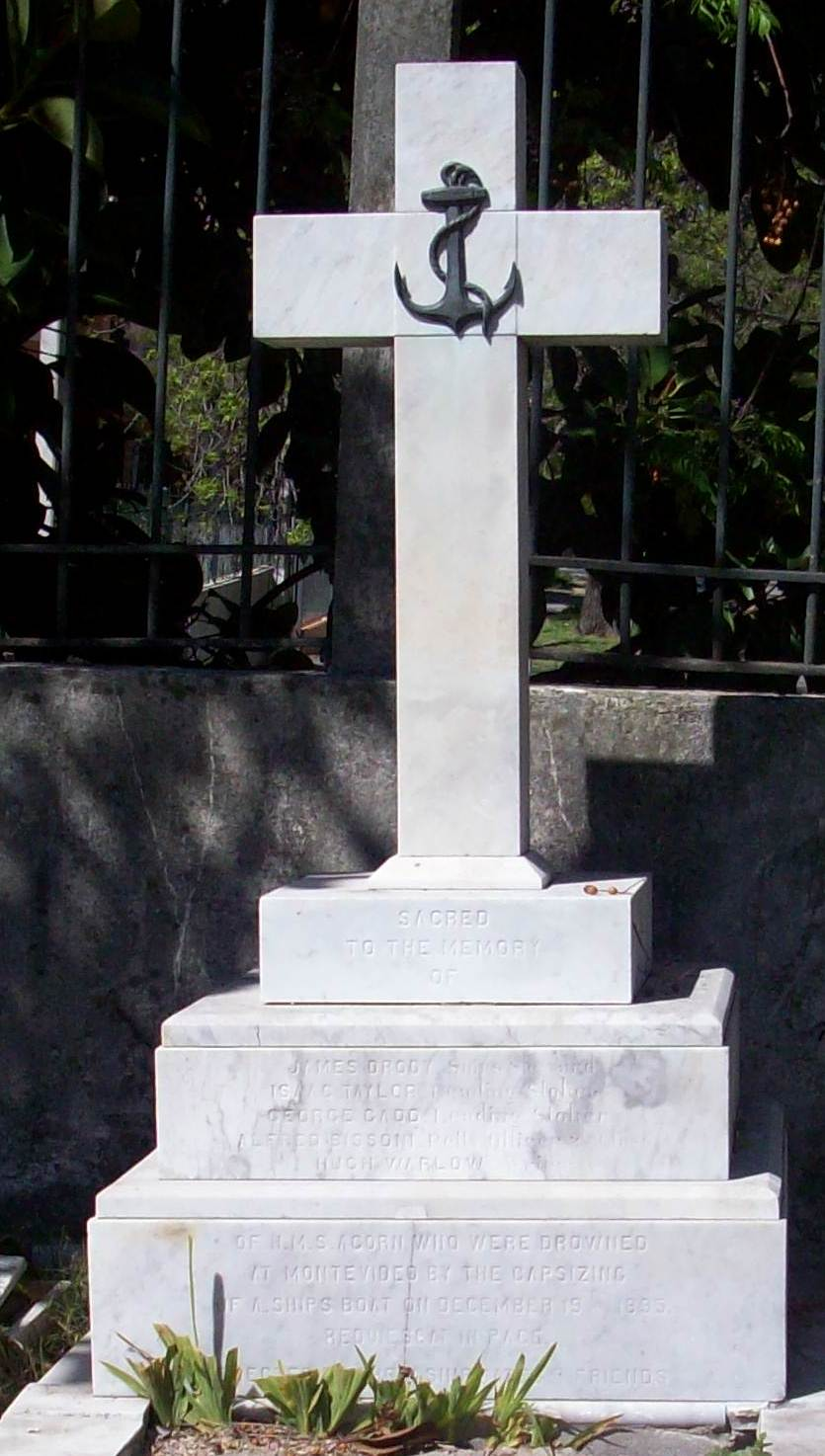
Stepped Cross, with Anchor

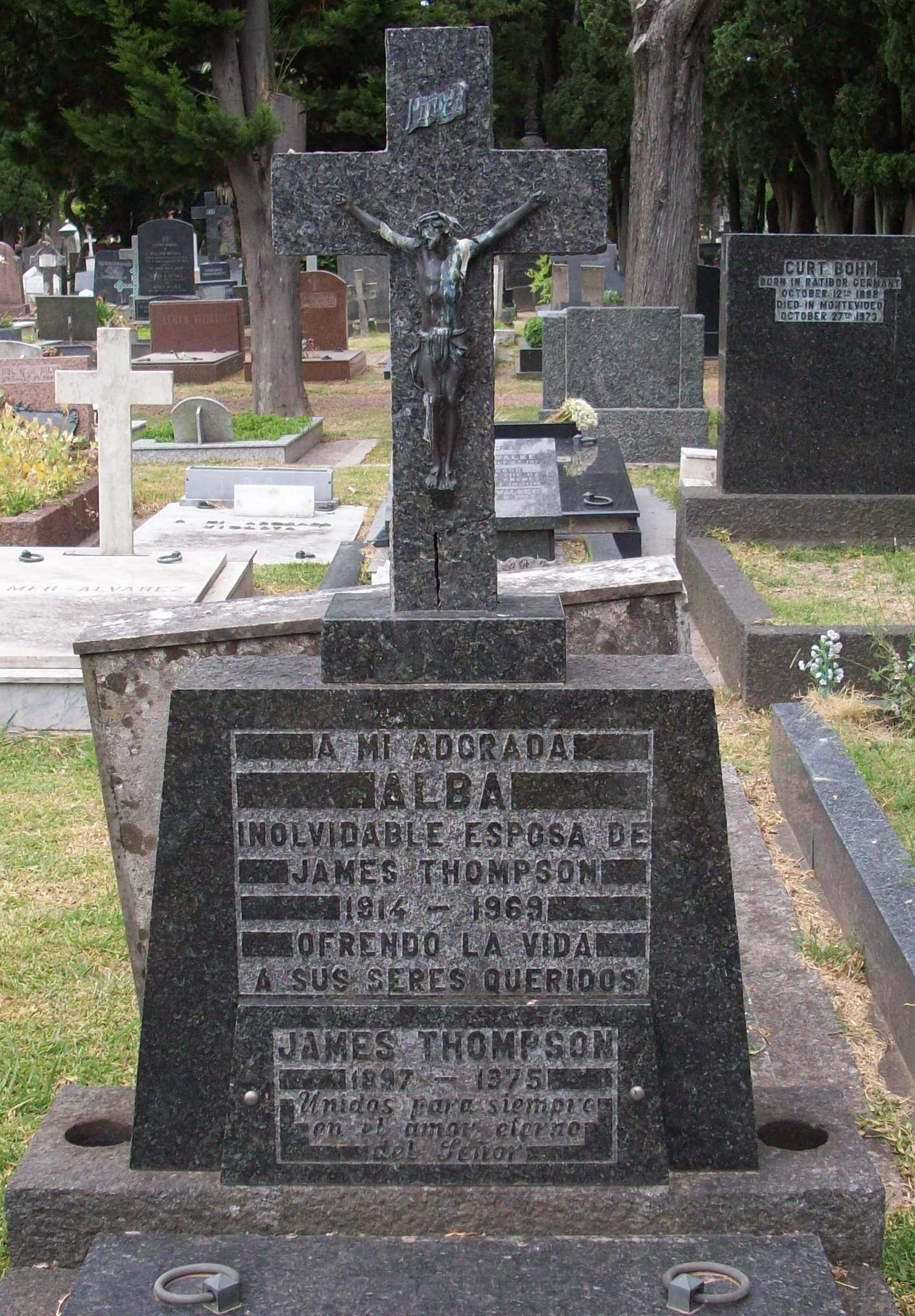
Crucifix

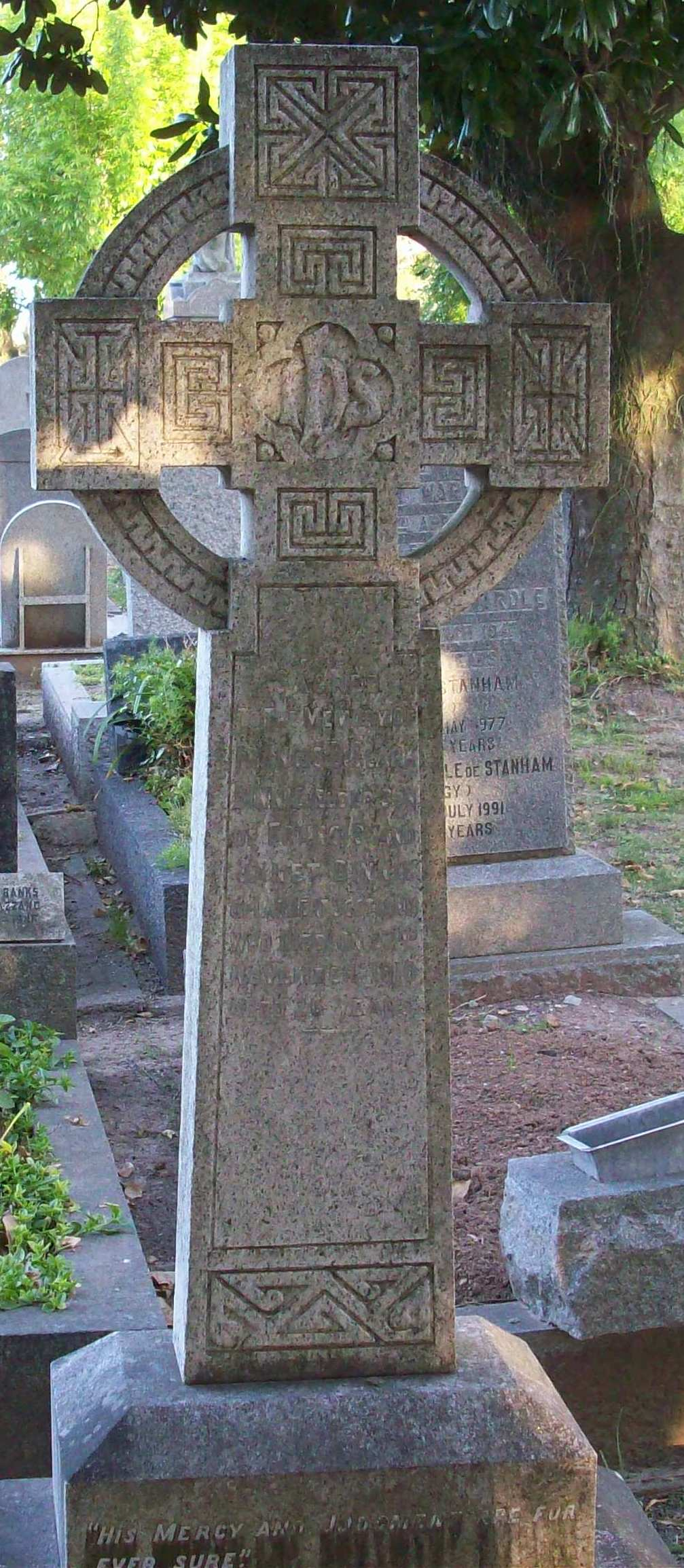
Celtic Cross

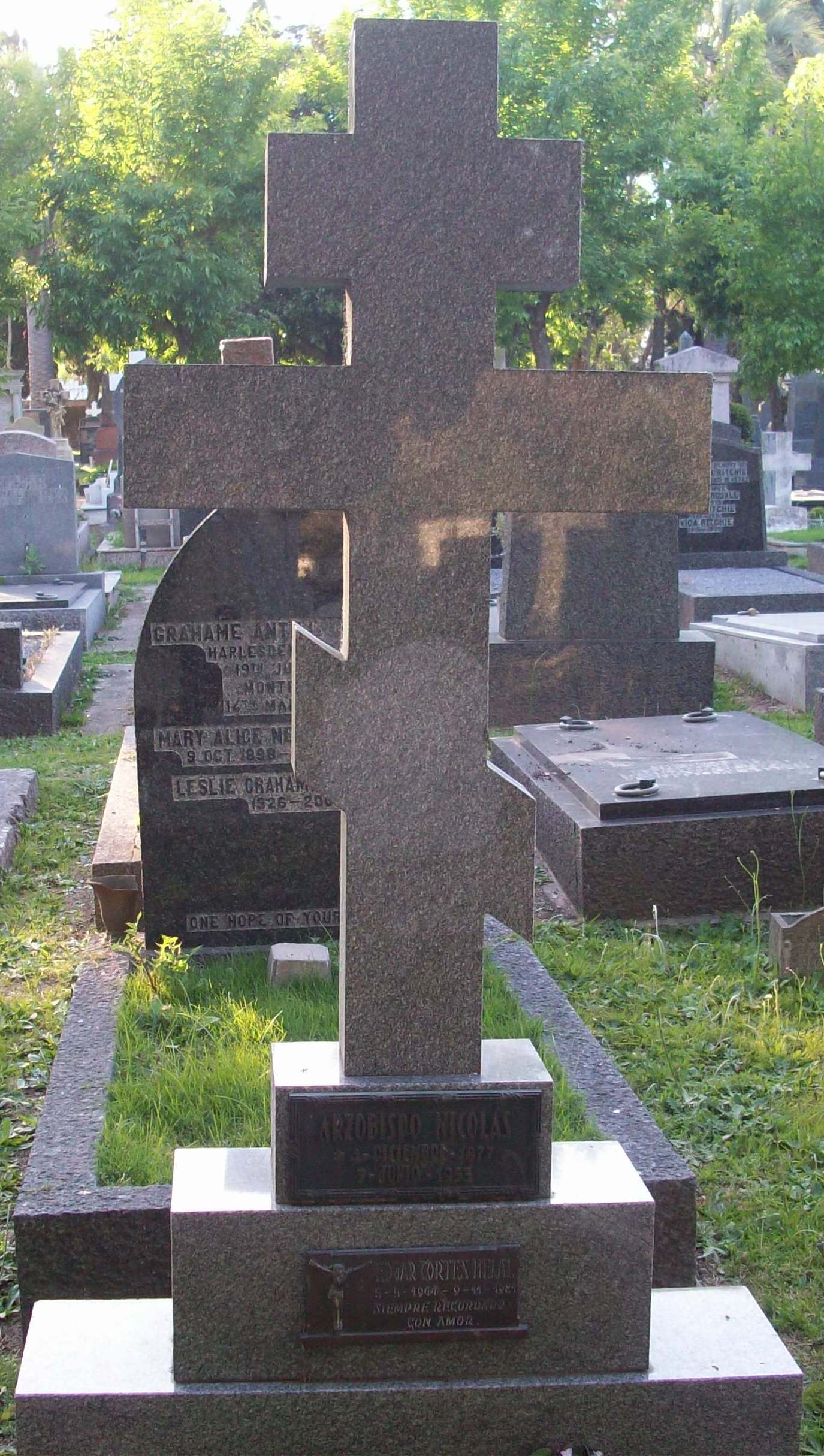
Russian Orthodox cross

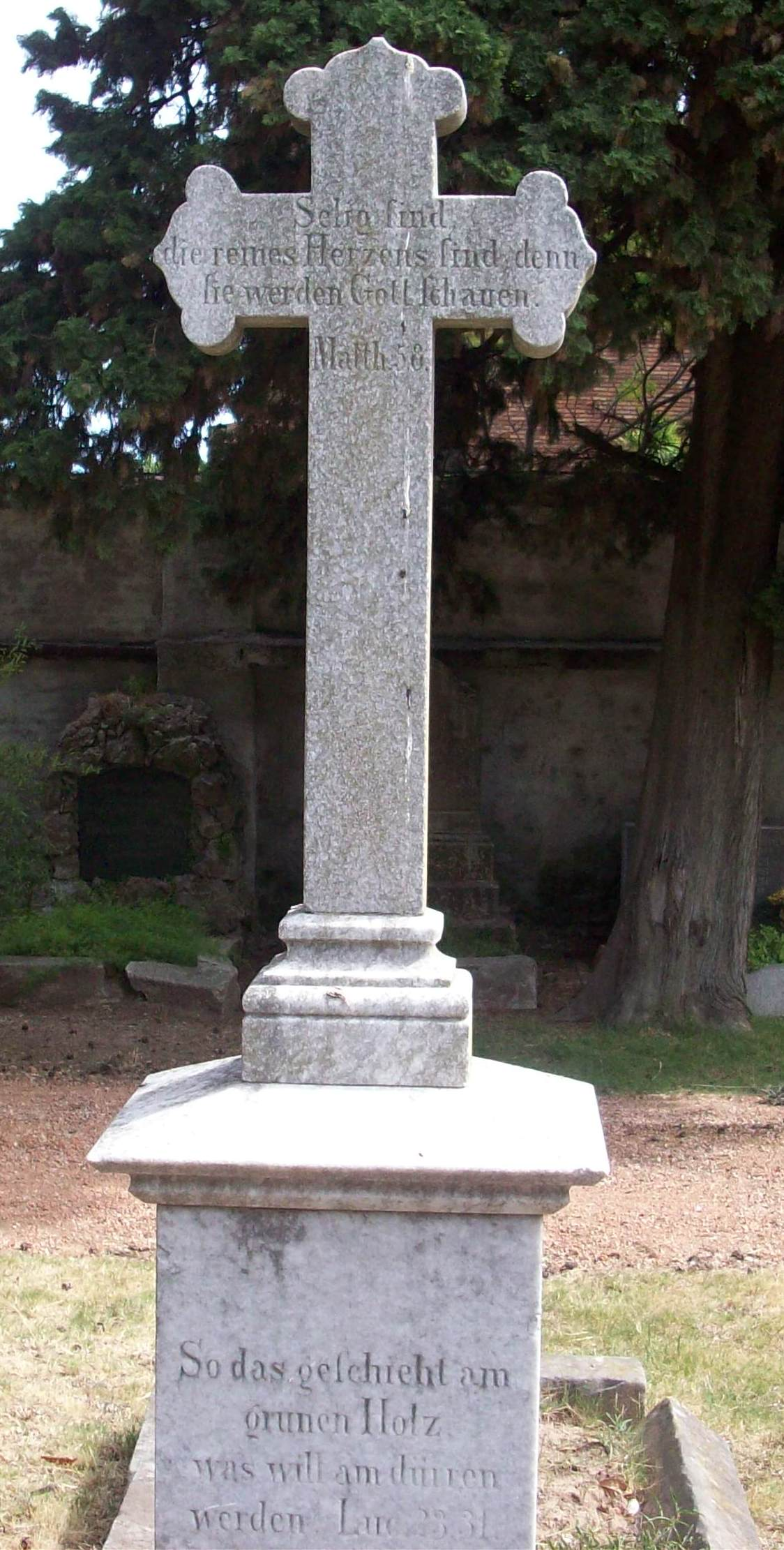
Bottonee Cross

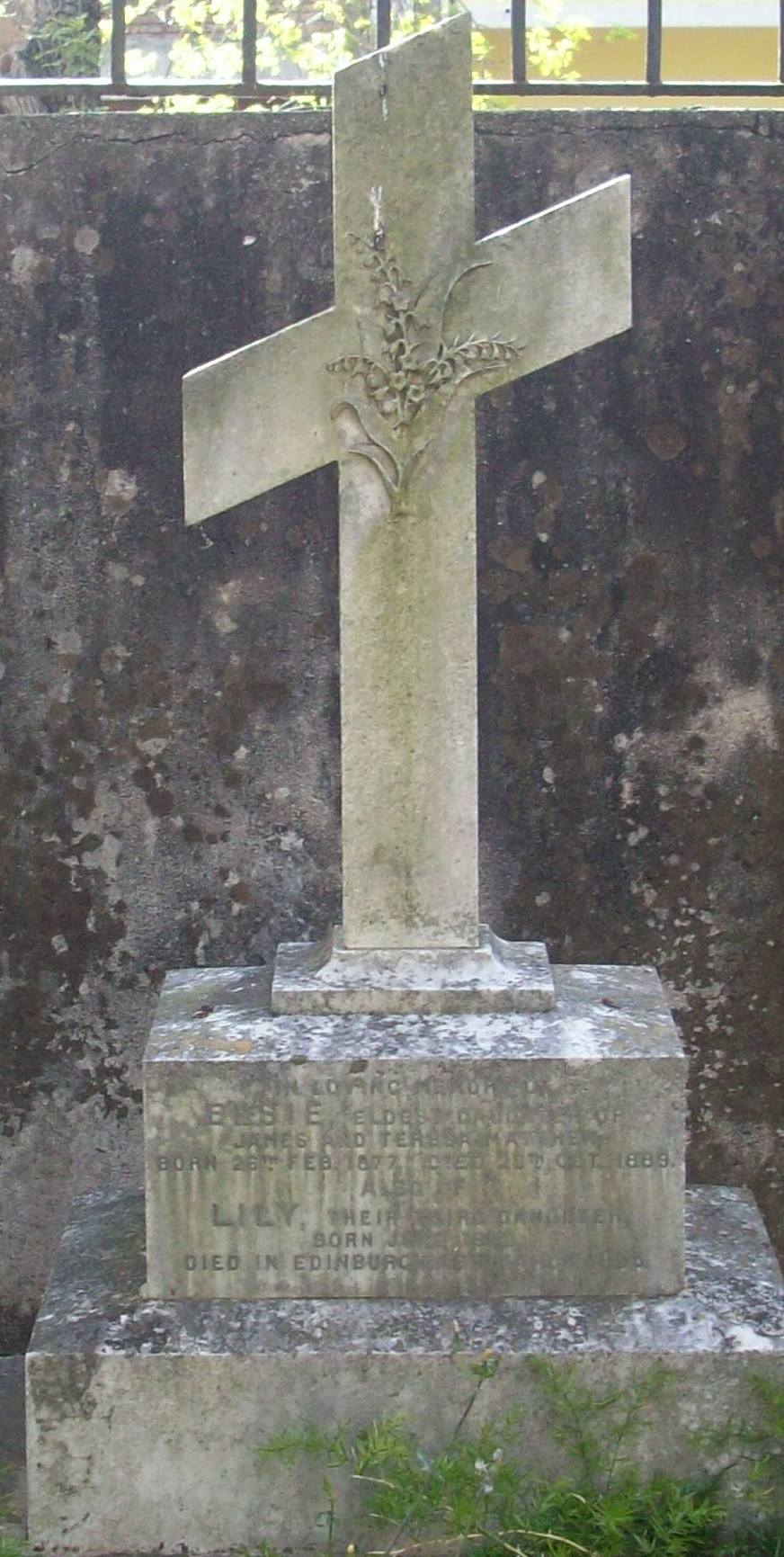

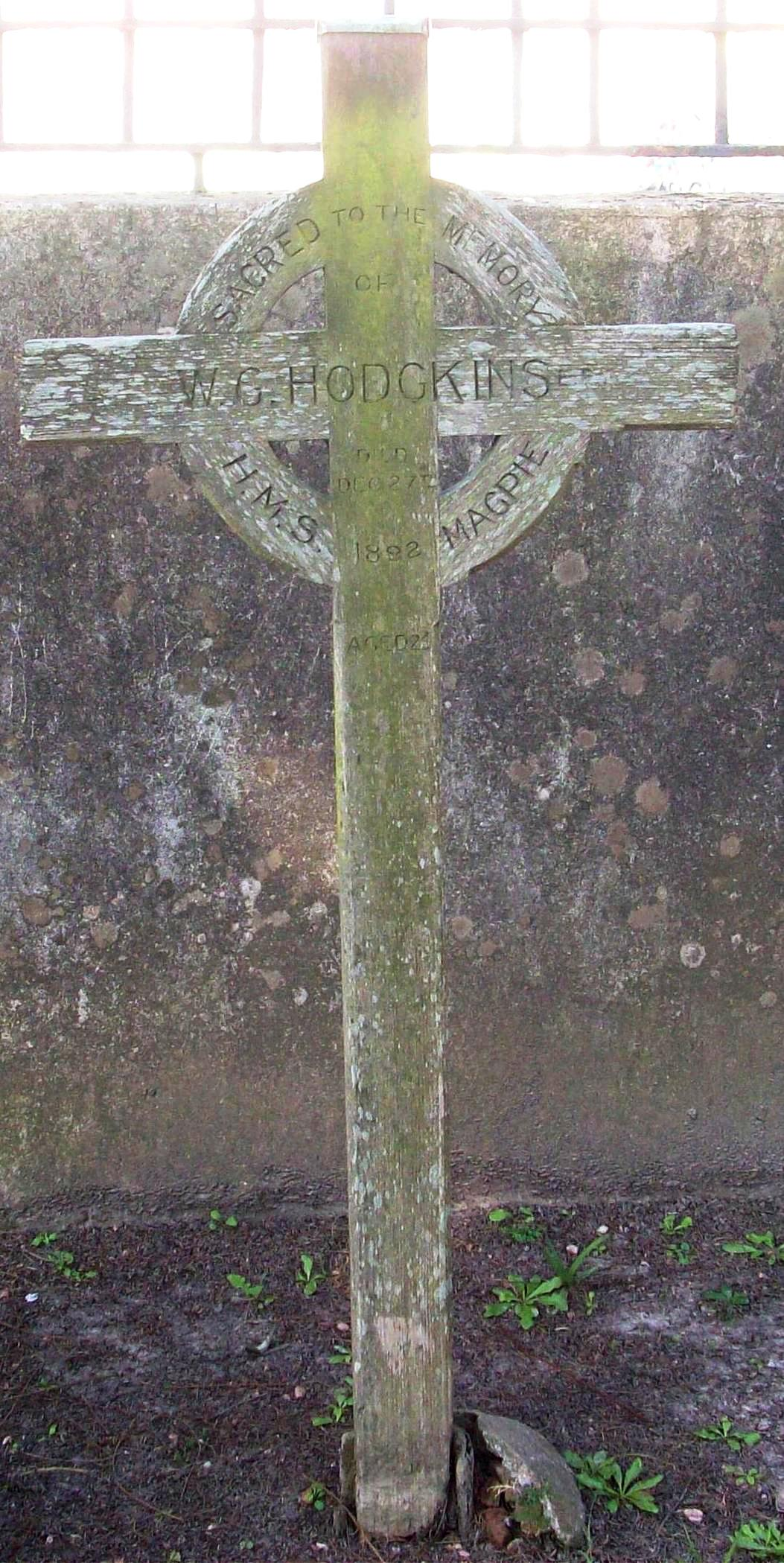
Wooden Cross

== Notable burials ==
=== Soldiers, sailors and airmen ===
The British Cemetery contains the graves of quite a number of soldiers, sailors and airmen of different nationalities, although the majority are of British descent. Some served with the Armed Forces, and others are from merchant ships that were in the River Plate area at the time. A few of these ships are well known to the general public, such as the Royston Grange or the Achilles, which was involved in the "Battle of the River Plate".

Various United States Marines are buried here.

- Frederick Crocker (1821–1911). American naval commander and US consul

=== Personalities ===
==== Arts ====
- Hector Sgarbi (1905–1982). Painter
- Carlos Sabat Ercasty (1887–1982). Poet
- Armonía Somers (1914–1994). Pseudonym of Uruguayan writer Armonía Liropeya Etchepare Locino
- Carla Witte (1889–1943). German artist
- Miguel Óscar Patrón Marchand (1943–2010). Orchestra conductor

==== Sports ====
- Helen Fay Crocker (1914–1983). First non-American golfer to win one of the LPGA major golf championships
- John Harley (1886–1960). Scottish born footballer who was player and manager of Peñarol Football Club
- William Leslie Poole (1866–1931). English teacher at the "English High School" Montevideo. Played football in Albion Football Club, known as the "Father of Uruguayan Football"

==== Business ====
===== Newspapers =====
- William Huskinson Denstone (1867–1925). Owner and editor of The Montevideo Times
- Thomas Havers (1810-1870). Businessman, architect and Director of Public Works in Montevideo

===== Others =====
- Samuel Fisher Lafone (1805–1871). English businessman
- Thomas Tomkinson (1804–1879). English businessman

==== Religious ====
- Archbishop Nicolas Solovey (1877–1953)
- Rev. Tudor Llewellyn Isaacs (1897-1973)

==== Others ====
- Iwan Lukjanowitsch Solonewitsch (1891–1953). Russian writer, thinker, journalist and social activist

== See also ==
- British Cemetery Montevideo Soldiers, Sailors and Airmen
- British Cemetery, Buenos Aires
- Early UK ambassadors to Uruguay

== Notes ==
1. The history of the Cemetery was taken from notes collected by Sir Robert Jackson, President of the British Cemetery Society during many years.
2. Use has also been made of an article in "El Plata", newspaper published in Montevideo on 26 February 1934.
