= Conchillas =

- Town
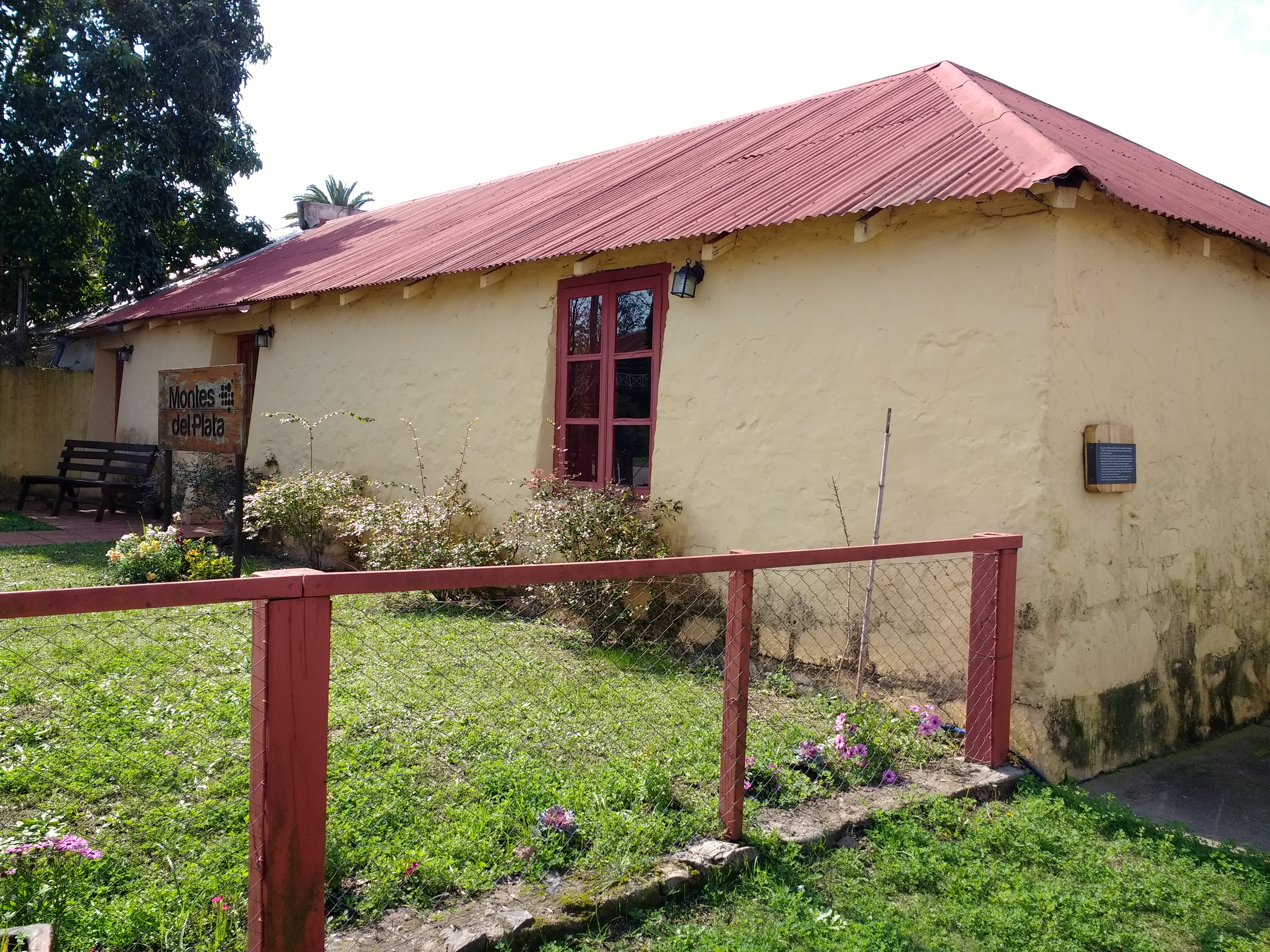

- Location within Uruguay
- Coordinates: 34°9′52″S 58°1′58″W
- Country: Uruguay
- Department: Colonia Department

Population (2011)
  - Total: 401
- Time zone: UTC -3
- Postal code: 70004
- Dial plan: +598 4577 (+4 digits)

Conchillas (Spanish pronunciation: [konˈtʃiʝas], locally [konˈtʃiʒas, -ˈtʃiʃas]) is a small industrial town located within the Colonia Department, in southwestern Uruguay.

== Geography ==
The town is located on the coast of Río de la Plata near the stream Arroyo Conchillas, 50 kilometres (31 mi) northwest of Colonia del Sacramento, the capital city of the department, and 40 kilometres (25 mi) southeast of Carmelo.

== History ==
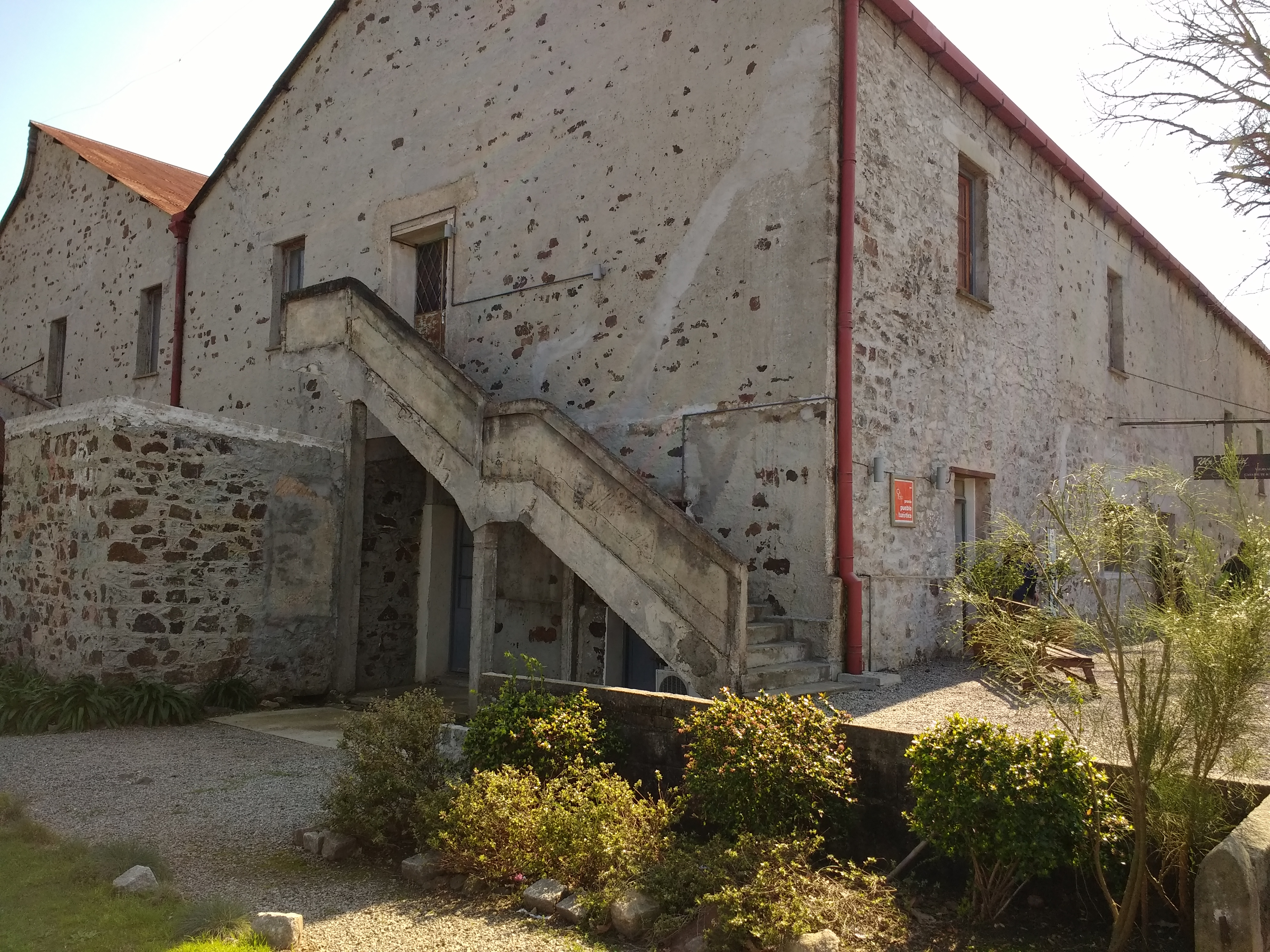
Edificio Evans, an important historic building in Conchillas

=== Foundation by the Walkers ===
The town was founded by the British on 24 October 1887. The date is still celebrated locally as 'Walker Day'. It soon became an important place for the exploitation of mineral resources. Thomas A. Walker was an English civil engineering contractor who had the contract to construct new docks at Buenos Aires. No building stone was available nearby to construct the docks and shipping costs by rail were excessive. Walker's solution was a radical one: to construct quarries at Conchillas and to ship the stone across the River Plate to the new dock site. This involved the construction of a whole village, a railway to a loading quay, and a fleet of small ships to carry the stone. Although this would not be the first time that Walker had constructed a new village to support a major construction project, this time he would even create a shipyard at one of his earlier villages, Sudbrook in South Wales, in order to build the ships needed.

Thomas Walker died in 1889. The contracting business became C.H. Walker & Co., although this inheritance to ensure continuity of the ongoing construction projects was complex and legally unique. His nephew, Charles Hay Walker, moved to Conchillas to supervise the work.

The English created a factory, founded two cemeteries, and established an Anglican Church.

==== Casa Evans ====
John Evans was a ship's cook on one of the Walker vessels. When the ship was lost in the River Plate, he opened a cantina on the shore, feeding the workers. This was successful and he expanded as a provision merchant. This business grew so well that it became a partnership with Walker & Co., who built a large warehouse and shop, which still survives. As was typical practice for contractors and 'company towns', Evans issued their own currency of tokens, which were widely accepted in the surroundings and recognised as legal tender by the Uruguayan government.

=== World War II ===
However, with the outbreak of the Second World War, Conchillas key infrastructure was sold to two Uruguayan entrepreneurs who introduced a series of modifications. Today, the English influence that resulted from the arrival of numerous European settlers is mainly evident in the architecture of Conchillas rather than in the way of life of its inhabitants.

=== Post-war ===
On 21 December 1955, the status of the localities known as "Conchillas y Gil" was elevated to "Pueblo" (village) under the common name "Conchillas" by the Act of Nº Ley 12.254. A pulp mill, harbour and power station was built around 2009.

== Population ==
According to the 2011 census, Conchillas had a population of 756.

Year	Population
1908	3,149
1963	825
1975	755
1985	727
1996	784
2004	756
2011	401*

Source: Instituto Nacional de Estadística de Uruguay
* In the 2011 census the population of the Pueblo Gil censual area (309 inh.) was counted separately from Conchillas.

== See also ==
- Barker, Uruguay
- Sudbrook, Monmouthshire
