= Cathedral of The Most Holy Trinity, Montevideo =

Church in Uruguay

Coordinates: 34°53′17.6″S 56°3′23.9″W

Cathedral of The Most Holy Trinity
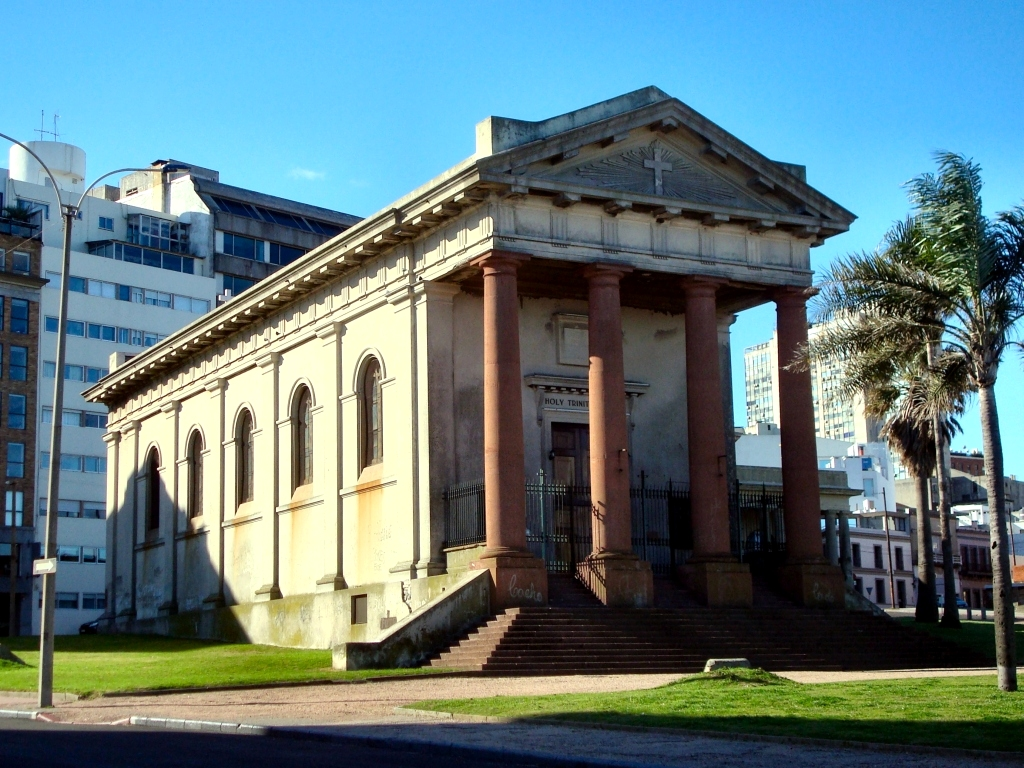

Religion
- Affiliation: Anglican
- Ecclesiastical or organizational status: Active

Location
- Location: Montevideo, Uruguay
- Interactive map of Cathedral of The Most Holy Trinity

Architecture
- Type: Cathedral
- Direction of façade: South

The Cathedral of The Most Holy Trinity (Spanish: Catedral de la Santísima Trinidad), popularly known as "Templo Inglés" (English Temple in Spanish), is an Anglican church in Montevideo, Uruguay.

== Overview ==
The original temple dates back to the 1830s and was built directly on the seashore. It was made possible through the sole effort of Samuel Fisher Lafone.

At the beginning of the 20th century, it was re-built on its current location, due to the modern development of the Rambla of Montevideo.

It is the cathedral of the Uruguayan diocese of the Anglican Church of South America.

== Bibliography ==
- Guía Arquitectónica y Urbanística de Montevideo. 3rd edition. Intendencia Municipal de Montevideo, 2008, ISBN 978-9974-600-26-3, page 32.

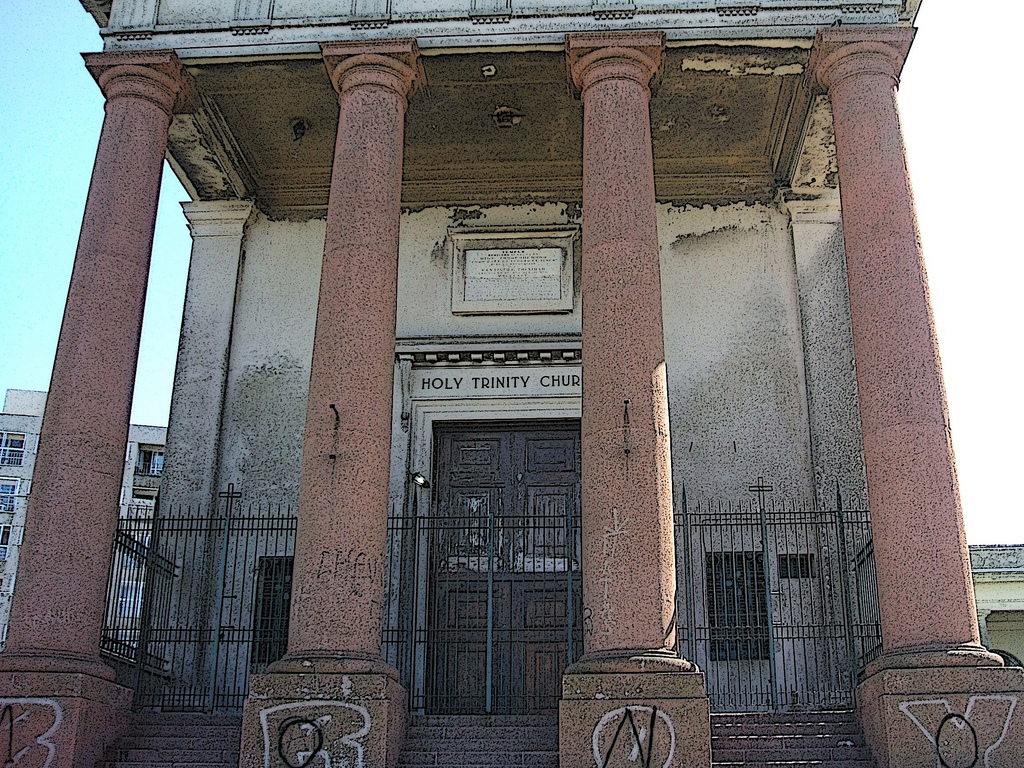
Holy Trinity Church, Montevideo

== See also ==
- List of cathedrals in Uruguay
- British people in Uruguay
