= Richard Bannister Hughes =

British businessman

Richard Bannister Hughes Mills (1810-1875), known as Richard Bannister Hughes and also Ricardo Hughes, was a British expatriate businessman in Uruguay. Notable as a rancher and entrepreneur, Hughes helped to modernize Uruguayan agriculture.

Originally from Liverpool, Hughes arrived in Montevideo on Christmas Day 1829, and eventually went into business with his two younger brothers. In 1856, he founded one of the first tourist estancias, Estancia La Paz. He was one of the founders of Villa Independencia (now Fray Bentos) and a salted meat factory which later became Liebig's Extract of Meat Company Limited.

== See also ==
- British immigration to Uruguay
