= Nina Miranda (Uruguayan singer) =

Uruguayan singer (1925–2012)

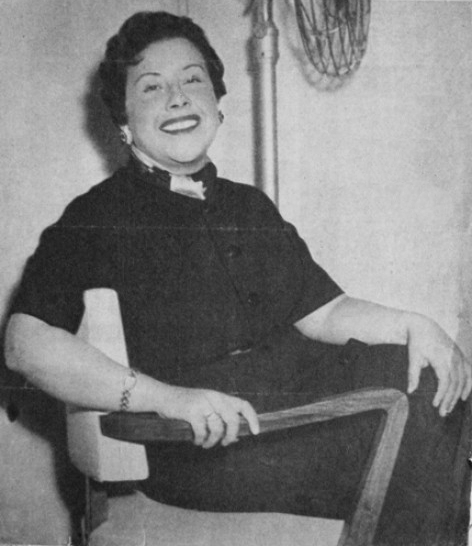
Nina Miranda

Nelly María Hunter, better known by her stage name Nina Miranda (November 8, 1925 – January 1, 2012) was a Uruguayan tango singer and composer who settled in Argentina in the early 1950s. She is known for the songs, "Maula", "Garufa", "Mamá, yo quiero un novio", "La tigra", and the popular "Fumando espero".

== Early years and education ==
"When I was 13, I went to the movie theater with Mom to see Puerta cerrada, a film which starred Libertad Lamarque and Agustín Irusta. She played the role of a female singer whose name was Nina Miranda. When we went out I firmly told my mother: “The day I’m an artist I shall use that name”."

Nelly María Hunter was born in Aguada, Montevideo. At the age of eight, she entered and won a singing contest after a schoolmate's father heard her sing. She moved several times as a child, spending her teen years in the Cerrito de la Victoria neighborhood of Montevideo at 3463 Bruno Méndez Street.

== Career ==
After winning a contest in 1942 on CX 36 Radio Centenario, she received a three-month contract. She then joined a women's orchestra, “Las Golondrinas”, led by Teresita Añón, which featured tangos, milongas and waltzes in its songbook. They toured the south of Brazil, up to Porto Alegre. A subsequent tour took the orchestra to a nightclub in São Paulo named Okey. Back in Montevideo, they performed at the Palacio Salvo's Café Palace.

Miranda performed with Francisco Reinares, Emilio Pellejero, Roberto Luratti before making her first recording, which was with Juan Cao. Thereafter, she sang as a duo with Alberto Bianchi. By 1948, she appeared at the Hotel Rambla with the Emilio Pellejero Orchestra. In 1952, she recorded the song Maula which became a hit, and was aired daily on the radio stations.

In August 1955, she arrived in Buenos Aires to expand her artistic opportunities, aided by the journalist Augusto Bonardo, director of Montevideo's Radio El Espectador. At Radio Centenario, she recorded with the Donato Racciati orchestra for Sondor and with Graciano Gómez for Odeon Records. Initially, she recorded fourteen songs. On the radio, she performed twice a week with the Lucio Demare Orchestra. After Juan Perón left office and the borders with Uruguay were reopened, she flew back and forth between Buenos Aires and Montevideo to perform on Radio El Espectador with a sextet which was led by Oldimar Cáceres. Her split with Graciano Gómez occurred after touring northern Argentina. Another tour followed, this time with the orchestra led by Héctor Norton. Thereafter, she toured until 1958 with her own ensemble which was led by Fernando Córdoba. She married an industrialist in 1957, and retired. After his death in 2004, she returned to tango, touring France, England, China and Brazil. She died in Buenos Aires in 2012.

== Filmography ==
- Ivor the Invisible (2001)
- Born Romantic (2000)
- Tainted (2010)
