= Eduardo Gordon (basketball) =

Uruguayan basketball player (born 1928)

Personal information
- Born: 25 May 1928 Montevideo, Uruguay
- Died: 25 September 2009 (aged 81)

Sport
- Sport: Basketball

Eduardo Mario Gordon Moreau (25 May 1928 – 25 September 2009) was a Uruguayan basketball player. He competed in the men's tournament at the 1948 Summer Olympics.
