= Jorge Wilson Menéndez =

Commander-in-chief of the National Navy of Uruguay (born 1965)

Admiral Jorge Wilson
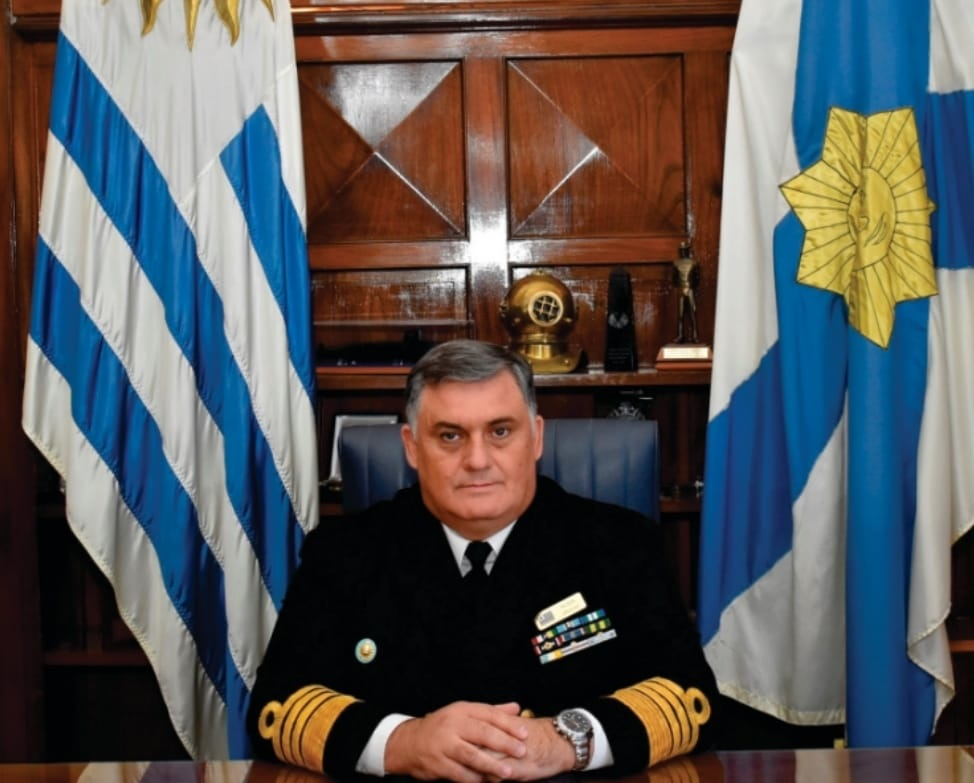

Commander-in-chief of the National Navy
- Incumbent
- Assumed office 4 March 2020
- President: Luis Lacalle Pou
- Preceded by: Admiral Carlos Abilleira
- Succeeded by: Admiral José Luis Elizondo

Personal details
- Born: Jorge Wilson Menéndez; October 13, 1965 (age 60) Montevideo, Uruguay
- Education: Uruguay Naval Academy

Military service
- Allegiance: Uruguay
- Branch/service: National Navy of Uruguay
- Years of service: 1985—present
- Rank: Admiral

Jorge Wilson Menéndez (born 13 October 1965) is a Uruguayan Admiral who serves a commander-in-chief of the National Navy of Uruguay since 2020.

== Early life and education ==
Wilson was born in Montevideo in 1965. In 1982 he enrolled at the Uruguay Naval Academy to be an officer in the National Navy. In 1985 he graduated as a Midshipman in the General Corps.

== Naval career ==
From 1993 to 1997, Wilson served as head of the Naval Academy's Educational Planning and School Administration Department. In 2003 he assumed the position of commander of the Uruguayan river patrol company URPAC K in the United Nations Organization Stabilization Mission in the Democratic Republic of the Congo (MONUSCO). In 2008 he began serving as a military observer and advisor to the mission's Force Commander.

He served in the Navy Fleet Command from 2003 to 2008. In 2009 he was appointed head of the Second Division of the General Staff of the General Directorate of Naval Personnel until 2012.

He has served as an officer on the destroyer escort ROU 18 de Julio and the ship ROU Presidente Rivera. He also commanded the frigates ROU Montevideo and ROU 15 de Noviembre.

In 2012 he was assigned to the United Nations Stabilisation Mission in Haiti as a military observer, holding the position of Chief of the U-7 Division of the Force Commander's General Staff. In 2016 he was appointed Naval Attaché to the Uruguayan Embassy in Washington D.C., and alternate delegate to the Inter-American Defense Board. He served in the United States until 2018, when upon his return to Uruguay he was promoted to the rank of Counter admiral and appointed Chief of the General Staff of the Navy.

On January 22, 2020, he was announced by the then president-elect Luis Lacalle Pou, as the new commander-in-chief of the National Navy, in succession to Carlos Abilleira. He took office on March 4, 2020.

== Honors ==
=== National ===
- Decoration Honor of Naval Merit Commander Peter Campbell
- 15 November 1817 Medal

=== Foreign ===
- Tamandaré Merit Medal (Brazi)
