= Margaret Graham (dancer) =

Argentine-Uruguayan ballet dancer

Margaret Graham (1931–2004) was an Argentine-Uruguayan ballet dancer.

== Biography ==
Brought up in Buenos Aires, Graham joined Alicia Alonso's company in 1949. Afterwards, in 1957 she moved to Montevideo, where she was hired by SODRE with the rank of prima ballerina and developed a brilliant career, spanning over 2 decades.

By recommendation of Margot Fonteyn, Graham studied at the Royal Ballet School. She was directed by Yurek Shabelevsky, Tamara Grigorieva, Roger Fenonjois, Michel Borovsky, María Ruanova, William Dollar, Vaslav Velchek, among others. In 1975 she created the Uruguayan National Dance School, where she trained several generations of dancers. She was also the first director of Uruguay's National dance school from 1975 to 1993. She retired in 2003.

Graham was a member of the Royal Academy of Dance and the Conseil International de la Danse.
