= Barker, Uruguay =

Barker
- Village
- Location within Uruguay
- Coordinates: 34°16′0″S 57°28′0″W
- Country: Uruguay
- Department: Colonia Department

Population (2011)
  - Total: 158
- Time zone: UTC -3
- Postal code: 70007
- Dial plan: +598 45 (+6 digits)

Barker (Spanish pronunciation: [ˈbaɾkeɾ]) is a small village located in the Colonia Department of southwestern Uruguay.

== Geography ==
Barker is located along Route 54. Its nearest populated places are Rosario, to the southeast and Tarariras, to the west. Near the town is the stream Arroyo Minuano and the hills Cuchilla del Minuano and Cuchilla del Colla.

== History ==
Barker was originally established as a small British settlement in Uruguay.

== Population ==
According to the 2011 census, Barker had a population of 158.

Year	Population
1963	171
1975	113
1985	91
1996	68
2004	91
2011	158

Source: Instituto Nacional de Estadística de Uruguay
