= The Montevideo Times =

- Owner: William Huskinson Denstone
- Editor: William Huskinson Denstone
- Founded: 1888
- Ceased publication: 1936
- Language: English
- Headquarters: Montevideo, Uruguay

The Montevideo Times was an English-language newspaper in Uruguay.

Established in 1888 with the denomination The Riverplate Times, it changed its name in 1890. Its owner and editor was William Huskinson Denstone (1867–1925). The newspaper was instrumental to British investors in Uruguay. It ceased to exist in 1936.

The paper was intended for British and American expatriates in Uruguay and did not endorse any political party, though it was known to be supportive of economic liberalism in general. It also reported on the social activities of the British community in Uruguay.
