= William Huskinson Denstone =

British newspaper editor (1867–1925)

- Born: 1867
- Died: 1925 (aged 57–58)
- Occupation: Newspaper editor

William Huskinson Denstone (Staffordshire, 1867 - Montevideo, 8 September 1925) was a British newspaper editor.

For a brief period he was editor of the Montevideo Independent (1887–1888); then he founded (1889) and edited The Montevideo Times.
