= Victoria Hall (Montevideo) =

Building in Montevideo, Uruguay

- Teatro Victoria
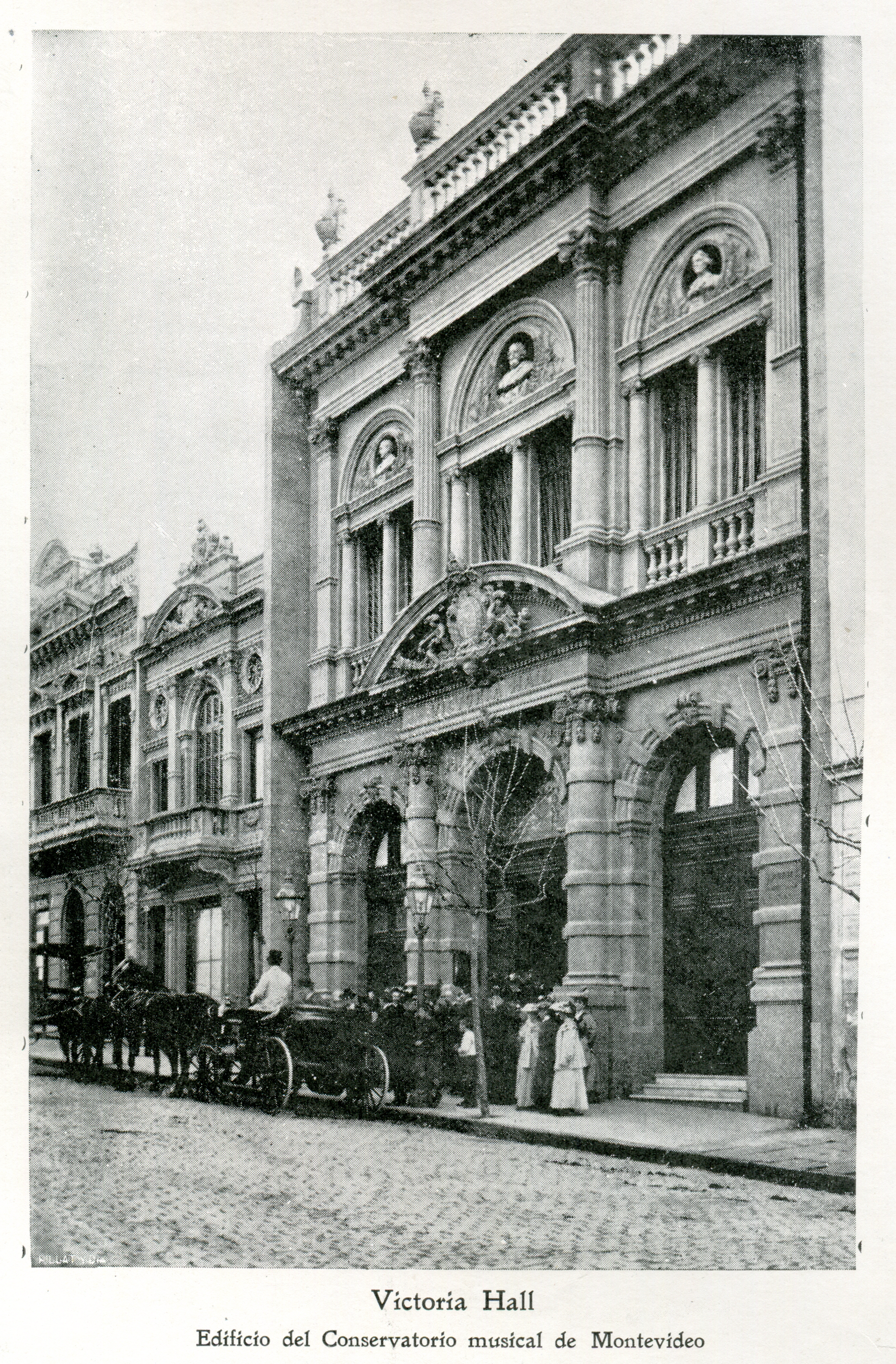
- Victoria Hall in 1907
- Interactive map of Victoria Hall
- Address: Río Negro 1477, 11100; Montevideo; Uruguay
- Coordinates: 34.90623°S 56.19343°W

Construction
- Opened: 1902
- Architect: John Adams

Victoria Hall (Spanish: Teatro Victoria) is an historic building located in the Central area of Montevideo, Uruguay.

== History ==
Originally a British property, it opened in 1902 as Victoria Hall. In the year 1897 the British Community decided to build a community hall and as a way of commemorating her Diamond Jubilee it was named after Queen Victoria. The Victoria Hall Society was formed, and after obtaining a loan from the British Cemetery Society, a suitable piece of land in calle Rio Negro was purchased, where the building was finally erected. The drive for funds for its construction was very small, and payments had to be made during the construction of the building, so that continuous loans had to be granted by the Cemetery Society, until such time as the building was finished. The so-called Victoria Hall Society could not even meet the payment of interest on the total loan, so finally an agreement was reached whereby the property was transferred to the British Cemetery Society. In this building, with a private entrance, the Acacia Lodge Temple was constructed, and the Acacia Lodge obtained a loan from the British Cemetery Society to import from the United Kingdom the furniture required for the Masonic Temple. When all the public utility companies, such as railways, waterworks, tramways etc. passed into the hands of the Government, the general idea was that there would no longer be any British Community. No use was made of the Victoria Hall; it was partly kept by the rent obtained from leasing it for weekend dances and theatre. Expenses, management, repairs, taxes etc. had to be paid by the British Cemetery Society with yearly losses, and as finally the community was no longer using the hall, decision was taken to sell it.

In 1996, the "Teatro Victoria" non profit association was created, with the aim of reopening the hall as a theatre and arts venue. In October 1998 it reopened with a performance of The Threepenny Opera by Bertolt Brecht, directed by Jorge Curi.
