= Uruguayans in Cuba =

Uruguayans in Cuba are people born in Uruguay who live in Cuba, or Cuban-born people of Uruguayan descent.

During the civic-military dictatorship of Uruguay (1973-1985), more than 1200 Uruguayans went into exile in Cuba, due to leftist parties like the Tupamaros arranging their asylumdom there.

== Notable people ==
Past

- Mario Benedetti (1920-2009), poet and writer
- Atahualpa del Cioppo (1904-1993), playwright
- Dahd Sfeir (1932-2015), actress
- Vladimir Turiansky (1927-2015), Communist politician and trade unionist
- Daniel Chavarria (1933-2018), revolutionary and writer

== See also ==
- Cubans in Uruguay
- Cuba–Uruguay relations
- Emigration from Uruguay
