= French Uruguayans =

Ethnic group

Franco-Uruguayen; Franco-Uruguayo

Total population
- 500.000

Regions with significant populations
- Through Uruguay

Languages
- Rioplatense Spanish · Minorities speak French and Basque.

Religion
- Roman Catholicism

Related ethnic groups
- French people · French Argentines

French Uruguayans (French: Franco-Uruguayen; Spanish: Franco-Uruguayos) are Uruguayan citizens of full or partial French ancestry. French Uruguayans form the third largest ancestry group after Spanish Uruguayans and Italian Uruguayans. Until 1853, France constituted the main source of immigrants to Uruguay. The country received the largest number of French immigrants to South America after Argentina (239,000) and Brazil (100,000), with almost 25,000 persons registered between 1833 and 1843.

== French immigration to Uruguay ==
During the first half of the 19th century, Uruguay received most of French immigrants to South America. It constituted back then, the second receptor of French immigrants in the New World after the United States. Thus, while the United States received 195,971 French immigrants between 1820 and 1855, 13,922 Frenchmen, most of them from the Basque Country and Béarn, left for Uruguay between 1833 and 1842. Then, after the fall of Rosas in 1852, Argentina overtook Uruguay and became the main pole of attraction for French immigrants in Latin America.

Most of French immigrants who settled in Uruguay immigrated between 1838 and 1852, with a peak of 10,300 immigrants in 1843. Frenchmen made up 41.5% of immigrants to Uruguay between 1835 and 1842, representing the main source of immigration to the country. Until 1853, French Basques constituted the most numerous group among all immigrants in Uruguay, then they were surpassed in numbers by Spaniards and Italians. Another great wave of French immigration to Uruguay occurred during the Paraguayan War until the 1870s. 2,718 French immigrants settled in the country between 1866 and 1867, 10.1% of the immigration at the time.

The majority of immigrants were coming from the Basque Country, Béarn and Bigorre.

The newspaper Le Patriote Français estimated the French colony in Montevideo in 1841 was around 18,000 persons. Another source claims the French colony in Uruguay reached 14,000 in 1842, 10,000 of them living in Montevideo and 4,000 in the countryside. 15,000 Frenchmen were registered in the country in 1843, most of them living in Montevideo where they made up a third of the population. The figure decreased to 8,891 in 1860 (making up 11.5% of foreigners) as many of them relocated to Buenos Aires but was as high as 17,900 in 1872. In 1866, French immigrants represented 16.5% of immigrants in the country (Spaniards 33.5% and Italians 33%). According to the census of 1884, there were 7,383 Frenchmen living in Montevideo, out of 164,028 inhabitants (i.e. 4.5% of the city population). In 1908, as previously established French immigrants had merged within the population and the country had received a large wave of immigration from Spain and Italy, Frenchmen only made up 1% of the population (8,341 persons) and 4.6% of foreigners. It was estimated that 9,500 Frenchmen were living in Uruguay in 1912, 6% of the 149,400 Frenchmen living in Latin America.

During the siege of Montevideo, out of 5,800 men defending the city, 2,500 were French. Three French poets were born in Uruguay: Isidore Ducasse, Comte de Lautréamont, Jules Laforgue and Jules Supervielle.

== Figures ==
The most recent figure corresponds to the 2011 Uruguayan census, which revealed 850 people who declared France as their country of birth.

Yearly French immigration to Uruguay from 1835 to 1842
Year	French immigrants	Total immigrants	% French immigrants
1835	43	613	7%
1836	998	3,146	31.7%
1837	442	2,583	17.1%
1838	2,071	5,424	38.2%
1839	342	1,163	29.4%
1840	835	2,475	33.7%
1841	3,816	7,860	48.5%
1842	5,218	9,874	52.8%
Total	13,765	33,138	41.5%

== Notable French Uruguayans ==
=== Architecture & Engineering ===
- Juan María Aubriot, architect.
- Ruperto Long Garat, civil engineer.
- César Loustau, architect and historian.
- Raúl A. Sichero Bouret, architect.

=== Art & Music ===
- Marcelo Buquet, actor.
- Alberto Candeau, actor.
- Luis Cluzeau Mortet, composer.
- Diógenes Hequet, artist.
- Osvaldo Laport, actor.
- Eduardo Larbanois, singer.
- Natalia Oreiro*, actress and singer.
- Daniel Pontet, painter.
- Luciano Supervielle, musician.
- Jaurés Lamarque Pons, composer, musician.

=== Education ===
- Gaston Gonnet, computer scientist.

=== Government ===
- Domingo Bordaberry, lawyer.
- Juan María Bordaberry, former president and dictator.
- Pedro Bordaberry, politician.
- José de Buschental, businessman.
- Armando Castaingdebat, politician.
- Guillermo Chifflet, politician.
- Eduardo Juan Couture, jurist.
- Laetitia d'Arenberg, businesswoman.
- Ariel Davrieux, politician.
- Ricardo Paseyro, diplomat.
- Ope Pasquet, politician.
- Daisy Tourné, politician.

=== Literature ===
- Hugo Achugar, poet, professor, and critic.
- Comte de Lautréamont, poet.
- Jules Laforgue, poet.
- Jules Supervielle, poet.

=== Sports ===
- Julio Abbadie, football player.
- Luis Aguerre, football player.
- Washington Aguerre, football player.
- Javier Ambrois, football player.
- Jorge Aude, football player and manager.
- Luis Barbat, football player.
- Facundo Boné, football player.
- Marcel Bouzout, basketball player.
- Álvaro Brun, football player.
- Nelson Chelle, basketball player.
- Javier Chevantón, football player.
- Sebastián Coates-Nion, football player.
- Mirto Davoine, football player.
- Walter Davoine, football player.
- Jerónimo Etcheverry, rugby union player.
- Fernando Fadeuille, football player.
- Andrés Fleurquin, football player.
- Pablo Forlan-Lamarque, football player.
- Diego Forlan-Lamarque, football player.
- Juan Martín Fumeaux, tennis player.
- Iván Guillauma, football player.
- Diego Godín, football player.
- Gianni Guigou, football player.
- Gabriel Hottegindre, skier
- Pablo Lemoine, rugby union player.
- Damián Malrrechaufe, football player.
- Gus Poyet, football player.
- Sergio Rochet, football player.

*Oriero grandmother's maiden name is Bourié

== See also ==
- France–Uruguay relations
- Immigration to Uruguay
- Uruguayans in France
- French Argentines
