= Demographics of Uruguay =

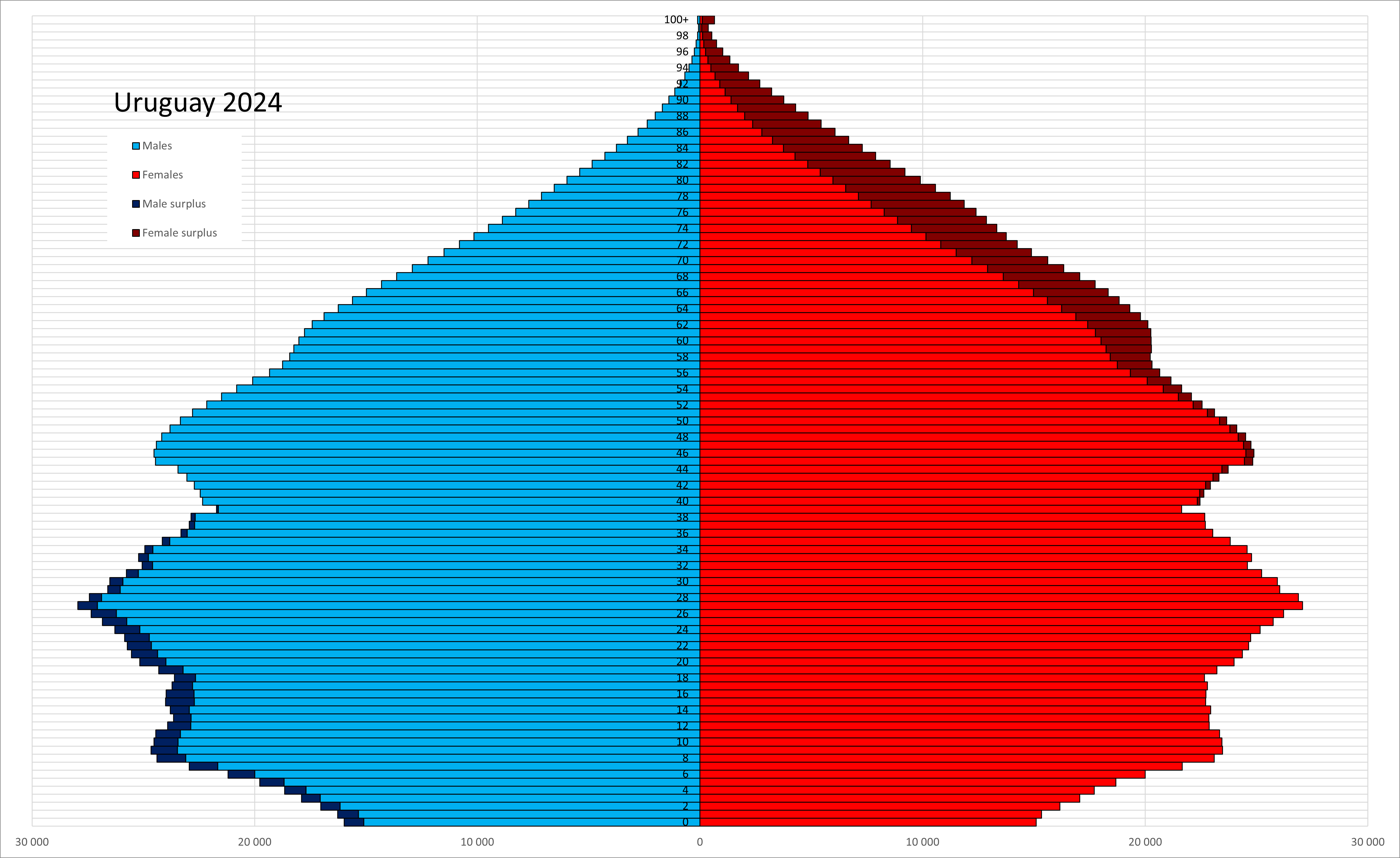
- Population pyramid of Uruguay in 2024
- Population: ▲3,444,263 (2023 census)
- Density: ▲19.43/km^{2} (50.3/sq mi) (2024 est.)
- Growth rate: ▼0.26% (2024 est.)
- Birth rate: ▼12.6 births/1,000 population (2024 est.)
- Death rate: ▼9.1 deaths/1,000 population (2024 est.)
- Life expectancy: ▲78.9 years
  - male: ▲75.8 years
  - female: ▲82.1 years (2024 est.)
- Fertility rate: ▼1.19 children born/woman (2024 est.)
- Infant mortality: ▼8 deaths/1,000 live births (2024 est.)
- Net migration rate: ▲ −0.9 migrant(s)/1,000 population (2024 est.)
- Immigrant share: 4.7% (2024)

Age structure
- 0–14 years: ▼17.9% (2025 est.)
- 15–64 years: ▲65.8% (2025 est.)
- 65 and over: ▲16.3% (2025 est.)

Sex ratio
- Total: 0.94 male(s)/female (2024 est.)
- At birth: 1.04 male(s)/female
- Under 15: 1.04 male(s)/female
- 15–64 years: 0.99 male(s)/female
- 65 and over: 0.68 male(s)/female

Nationality
- Nationality: Uruguayan
- Major ethnic: White (86,00%); Spanish (70–80%); Italian (40–44%); French (15%); German (N/D); Others (N/D)
- Minor ethnic: Black (10,60%); Native (6,70%); Charrúa (N/D); Others (N/D); East Asian (0.70%); Other (6,70%); Unspecified (0,2%)

Language
- Official: Spanish
- Spoken: Large minority: Portuñol; Italian; Galician; Basque; Plautdietsch; Indigenous (nearly extinct): Guaraní; Chaná

This is a demography of the population of Uruguay including population density, ethnicity, religious affiliations and other aspects of the population.

== Population size and structure ==
Census population
Year	Pop.	±% p.a.
1852	131,969	—
1860	223,238	+6.79%
1908	1,042,686	+3.26%
1963	2,634,555	+1.70%
1975	2,828,544	+0.59%
1985	3,008,649	+0.62%
1996	3,258,203	+0.73%
2004	3,341,417	+0.32%
2011	3,412,636	+0.30%
2023	3,499,451	+0.21%

According to the 2022 revision of the World Population Prospects the total population was 3,426,260 in 2021, compared to only 2,239,000 in 1950. The proportion of children below the age of 15 in 2015 was 21.4%, 64.2% was between 15 and 65 years of age, while 14.4% was 65 years or older.

	Total population	Proportion aged 0–14 (%)	Proportion aged 15–64 (%)	Proportion aged 65+ (%)
1950	2 239 000	27.9	63.9	8.2
1955	2 373 000	27.6	64.3	8.1
1960	2 539 000	27.8	64.1	8.1
1965	2 695 000	28.1	63.6	8.3
1970	2 810 000	27.9	63.3	8.8
1975	2 830 000	27.7	62.7	9.6
1980	2 916 000	26.9	62.7	10.4
1985	3 012 000	26.8	62.3	10.9
1990	3 110 000	26.0	62.4	11.6
1995	3 225 000	25.0	62.6	12.4
2000	3 321 000	24.5	62.4	13.0
2005	3 326 000	23.8	62.8	13.5
2010	3 374 000	22.5	63.7	13.8
2015	3 432 000	21.4	64.2	14.4

=== Demographic distribution ===
Metropolitan Montevideo, with about one and a half million inhabitants, is the capital and largest city. The rest of the urban population lives in about 20 towns. Montevideo is about 200 kilometers (120 mi) away from Buenos Aires in neighboring Argentina.

Uruguay is distinguished by its high literacy rate (97.3%) and a large urban middle class.

As a result of the low birth rate, high life expectancy, and relatively high rate of emigration of younger people, Uruguay's population is quite mature. In 2006, the country had a birth rate of 13.91 births per thousand population, lower than neighboring countries Argentina (16.73 births/1000 population)[3] and Brazil (16.56 births/1,000 population).

Demographic distribution by departments according to the Census results
Department	2011 census	2023 census
Artigas	76,043	77,487
Canelones	536,761	608,956
Cerro Largo	89,223	91,025
Colonia	127,358	135,797
Durazno	59,018	62,011
Flores	26,509	26,271
Florida	69,265	70,325
Lavalleja	60,205	59,175
Maldonado	172,130	212,951
Montevideo	1,375,540	1,302,954
Paysandú	117,023	121,843
Río Negro Department	56,013	57,334
Rivera	106,522	109,300
Rocha	73,520	80,707
Salto	128,803	136,197
San José	110,323	119,714
Soriano	84,535	83,685
Tacuarembó	93,236	96,013
Treinta y Tres	50,611	47,706

View source data.
View source data.

=== Structure of the population ===
Population by Sex and Age Group (Census 04.X.2011) (Excluding 437 homeless persons.):

Age group	Male	Female	Total	%
Total	1 577 416	1 708 461	3 285 877	100
0–4	112 704	107 641	220 345	6.71
5–9	121 820	116 248	238 068	7.25
10–14	131 022	125 530	256 552	7.81
15–19	133 042	128 649	261 691	7.96
20–24	119 928	121 078	241 006	7.33
25–29	112 852	115 533	228 385	6.95
30–34	113 884	119 481	233 365	7.10
35–39	108 704	113 817	222 521	6.77
40–44	98 612	104 486	203 098	6.18
45–49	95 812	102 961	198 773	6.05
50–54	93 175	101 390	194 565	5.92
55–59	81 828	91 179	173 007	5.27
60–64	69 864	80 911	150 775	4.59
65–69	58 769	72 794	131 563	4.00
70–74	47 705	64 690	112 395	3.42
75–79	36 806	56 853	93 659	2.85
80–84	24 912	45 593	70 505	2.15
85–89	11 535	25 891	37 426	1.14
90–94	3 636	10 477	14 113	0.43
95–99	733	2 813	3 546	0.11
100+	73	446	519	0.02
Age group	Male	Female	Total	Percent
0–14	365 546	349 419	714 965	21.76
15–64	1 027 701	1 079 485	2 107 186	64.13
65+	184 169	279 557	464 026	14.12

Population Estimates by Sex and Age Group (01.VII.2021) (Data refer to national projections.):

Age group	Male	Female	Total	%
Total	1 718 089	1 824 936	3 543 026	100
0–4	115 596	110 257	225 853	6.37
5–9	117 523	112 140	229 663	6.48
10–14	120 433	115 127	235 560	6.65
15–19	127 596	122 265	249 861	7.05
20–24	135 201	130 480	265 682	7.50
25–29	134 040	131 180	265 220	7.49
30–34	125 736	124 495	250 231	7.06
35–39	118 584	119 068	237 652	6.71
40–44	118 608	122 445	241 053	6.80
45–49	111 148	115 632	226 780	6.40
50–54	99 048	106 336	205 384	5.80
55–59	94 956	104 859	199 816	5.64
60–64	86 974	99 168	186 142	5.25
65–69	71 453	86 108	157 560	4.45
70–74	54 568	71 791	126 360	3.57
75–79	39 695	58 860	98 555	2.78
80–84	25 487	44 662	70 149	1.98
85–89	14 098	30 179	44 277	1.25
90+	7 343	19 885	27 227	0.77
Age group	Male	Female	Total	Percent
0–14	353 552	337 524	691 076	19.51
15–64	1 151 893	1 175 927	2 327 820	65.70
65+	212 644	311 485	524 129	14.79

== Vital statistics ==
=== Official vital statistics ===
	Average population	Live births	Deaths	Natural change	Crude birth rate (per 1000)	Crude death rate (per 1000)	Natural change (per 1000)	Crude migration rate (per 1000)	Total fertility rate (Note: In fertility rates, 2.1 and above is a stable population and has been marked blue, 2 and below leads to an aging population and the result is that the population decreases.)
1881	487,700	24,609			50.5				
1882	505,207	24,977			49.4				5.76
1883	526,700	25,592			48.6				5.71
1884	547,800	25,048			45.7				5.21
1885	569,800	27,378			48.0				5.45
1886	592,600	28,419			48.0				5.56
1887	616,400	28,902			46.9				5.64
1888	641,100	29,707			46.3				5.63
1889	665,400	31,028			46.6				5.57
1890	689,100	32,084			46.6				5.45
1891	712,200	33,000			46.3				5.44
1892	728,447	32,282			44.3				5.31
1893	756,200	31,496			41.7				5.04
1894	778,500	32,759			42.1				5.11
1895	801,500	34,963			43.6				5.25
1896	825,100	35,651			43.2				5.07
1897	849,400	31,432			37.0				4.30
1898	874,400	33,427			38.2				4.50
1899	897,900	35,327			39.3				4.60
1900	926,000	30,580	12,878	17,702	33.0	13.9	19.1		4.50
1901	951,000	31,703	12,504	19,199	33.3	13.1	20.2	6.1	4.41
1902	976,000	31,526	13,439	18,087	32.3	13.8	18.5	7.1	4.31
1903	1,004,000	32,600	13,673	18,927	32.5	13.6	18.9	9.0	4.34
1904	1,023,000	26,984	11,515	15,469	26.4	11.3	15.1	3.5	4.37
1905	1,056,000	33,709	13,612	20,097	31.9	12.9	19.0	12.3	4.4
1906	1,087,000	32,578	15,083	17,495	30.0	13.9	16.1	12.4	4.42
1907	1,124,000	33,657	15,561	18,096	29.9	13.8	16.1	16.8	4.45
1908	1,043,000	35,520	14,421	21,099	34.1	13.8	20.2	-97.9	4.43
1909	1,079,000	35,663	15,249	20,414	33.1	14.1	18.9	14.5	4.41
1910	1,116,000	35,927	16,515	19,412	32.2	14.8	17.4	15.8	4.38
1911	1,160,000	37,530	16,552	20,978	32.4	14.3	18.1	19.8	4.36
1912	1,208,000	39,171	16,745	22,426	32.4	13.9	18.6	21.1	4.34
1913	1,261,000	40,315	15,374	24,941	32.0	12.2	19.8	22.2	4.22
1914	1,297,000	38,571	15,350	23,221	29.7	11.8	17.9	9.9	4.1
1915	1,327,000	38,046	16,602	21,444	28.7	12.5	16.2	6.4	3.98
1916	1,359,000	36,983	20,338	16,645	27.2	15.0	12.2	11.3	3.86
1917	1,387,000	36,752	17,348	19,404	26.5	12.5	14.0	6.2	3.74
1918	1,409,000	38,914	20,009	18,905	27.6	14.2	13.4	2.2	3.69
1919	1,442,000	39,307	18,904	20,403	27.3	13.1	14.1	8.8	3.64
1920	1,473,000	39,335	19,041	20,294	26.7	12.9	13.8	7.2	3.59
1921	1,505,000	39,611	18,449	21,162	26.3	12.3	14.1	7.2	3.53
1922	1,542,000	40,261	16,415	23,846	26.1	10.6	15.5	8.5	3.48
1923	1,579,000	40,231	18,110	22,121	25.5	11.5	14.0	9.4	3.45
1924	1,616,000	41,880	19,132	22,748	25.9	11.8	14.1	8.8	3.43
1925	1,653,000	42,167	19,332	22,835	25.5	11.7	13.8	8.6	3.4
1926	1,695,000	43,091	17,828	25,263	25.4	10.5	14.9	9.9	3.37
1927	1,737,000	42,845	19,939	22,906	24.7	11.5	13.2	11.0	3.34
1928	1,782,000	44,632	19,070	25,562	25.0	10.7	14.3	11.0	3.27
1929	1,823,000	44,236	19,660	24,576	24.3	10.8	13.5	9.0	3.2
1930	1,875,000	45,718	20,049	25,669	24.4	10.7	13.7	14.0	3.13
1931	1,922,000	44,854	21,163	23,691	23.3	11.0	12.3	12.2	3.06
1932	1,956,000	44,036	19,825	24,211	22.5	10.1	12.4	5.0	2.99
1933	1,982,000	41,650	20,358	21,292	21.0	10.3	10.7	2.4	2.93
1934	2,007,000	41,337	20,065	21,272	20.6	10.0	10.6	1.9	2.86
1935	2,030,000	41,426	21,514	19,912	20.4	10.6	9.8	1.5	2.8
1936	2,053,000	40,705	19,843	20,862	19.8	9.7	10.2	1.0	2.74
1937	2,080,000	41,337	21,561	19,776	19.9	10.4	9.5	3.5	2.68
1938	2,108,000	41,701	21,658	20,043	19.8	10.3	9.5	3.8	
1939	2,132,000	42,862	19,341	23,521	20.1	9.1	11.0	0.3	
1940	2,155,000	42,893	20,695	22,198	19.9	9.6	10.3	0.4	
1941	2,175,000	44,287	20,381	23,906	20.4	9.4	11.0	−1.8	
1942	2,194,000	42,670	20,646	22,024	19.4	9.4	10.0	−1.3	
1943	2,211,000	43,500	20,738	22,762	19.7	9.4	10.3	−2.6	
1944	2,216,000	46,443	19,990	26,453	21.0	9.0	11.9	−9.6	
1945	2,266,000	49,021	19,627	29,394	21.6	8.7	13.0	9.1	
1946	2,290,000	48,978	18,415	30,563	21.4	8.0	13.3	−2.8	
1947	2,317,000	46,796	20,139	26,657	20.2	8.7	11.5	0.2	
1948	2,343,000	49,033	19,326	29,707	20.9	8.2	12.7	−1.6	
1949	2,383,000	54,838	18,351	36,487	23.0	7.7	15.3	1.5	
1950	2,239,000	56,858	19,199	37,659	25.4	8.6	16.8	−81.1	2.69
1951	2,261,000	45,281	19,190	26,091	20.0	8.5	11.5	−1.8	2.70
1952	2,286,000	46,710	19,083	27,627	20.4	8.4	12.1	−1.2	2.72
1953	2,313,000	47,464	19,408	28,056	20.5	8.4	12.1	−0.4	2.74
1954	2,342,000	49,888	19,153	30,735	21.3	8.2	13.1	−0.7	2.76
1955	2,373,000	56,111	20,611	35,500	23.7	8.7	15.0	−1.8	2.76
1956	2,405,000	56,389	19,895	36,494	23.5	8.3	15.2	−1.9	2.79
1957	2,438,000	56,337	21,722	34,615	23.1	8.9	14.2	−0.7	2.80
1958	2,471,000	57,100	20,937	36,163	23.1	8.5	14.6	−1.2	2.81
1959	2,505,000	56,589	23,523	33,066	22.6	9.4	13.2	0.4	2.82
1960	2,539,000	56,302	22,104	38,507	22.2	8.7	15.2	−1.8	2.83
1961	2,572,000	54,950	21,954	42,503	21.4	8.5	16.5	−3.7	2.85
1962	2,604,000	56,120	22,563	43,541	21.6	8.7	16.7	−4.4	2.87
1963	2,635,000	57,141	23,524	39,542	21.7	8.9	15.0	−3.2	2.88
1964	2,666,000	55,100	24,118	38,707	20.7	9.0	14.5	−2.9	2.86
1965	2,695,000	53,830	24,774	35,440	20.0	9.2	13.2	−2.4	2.84
1966	2,723,000	51,120	24,862	33,966	18.8	9.1	12.5	−2.2	2.82
1967	2,750,000	52,010	26,484	34,024	18.9	9.6	12.4	−2.6	2.78
1968	2,775,000	53,330	25,991	35,277	19.2	9.4	12.7	−3.7	2.77
1969	2,795,000	56,750	27,544	28,456	20.3	9.9	10.2	−3.0	2.77
1970	2,810,000	54,870	26,441	28,429	19.5	9.4	10.1	−4.8	2.77
1971	2,818,000	55,990	28,527	27,463	19.9	10.1	9.7	−6.9	2.77
1972	2,821,000	56,470	28,327	28,143	20.0	10.0	10.0	−8.6	2.78
1973	2,822,000	56,640	28,438	28,202	20.1	10.1	10.0	−10.0	2.85
1974	2,824,000	58,280	28,289	29,991	20.7	10.0	10.6	−9.9	2.96
1975	2,830,000	59,140	27,439	31,703	20.9	9.7	11.2	−9.1	3.02
1976	2,842,000	59,190	28,845	30,345	20.8	10.2	10.7	−6.5	3.00
1977	2,857,000	57,976	28,927	29,049	20.3	10.1	10.2	−4.9	2.90
1978	2,876,000	57,276	28,076	29,235	19.9	9.8	10.2	−3.6	2.83
1979	2,896,000	55,770	28,321	27,449	19.3	9.8	9.5	−2.6	2.71
1980	2,916,000	53,854	29,844	24,010	19.1	10.6	8.5	−1.6	2.59
1981	2,935,000	53,923	27,644	26,279	18.4	9.4	9.0	2.5	2.53
1982	2,954,000	53,594	27,186	26,527	18.2	9.2	9.0	−2.6	2.51
1983	2,973,000	53,405	28,475	24,930	18.0	9.6	8.4	−2.0	2.49
1984	2,993,000	53,348	30,011	23,337	17.8	10.0	7.8	−1.1	2.47
1985	3,012,000	53,766	28,566	25,200	17.9	9.5	8.4	−2.1	2.47
1986	3,031,000	54,080	28,791	25,289	17.9	9.5	8.4	−2.1	2.47
1987	3,050,000	53,368	29,885	23,483	17.5	9.8	7.7	−1.5	2.49
1988	3,069,000	55,798	30,912	24,886	18.2	10.1	8.1	−1.9	2.50
1989	3,089,000	55,324	29,629	25,703	17.9	9.6	8.3	−1.8	2.50
1990	3,110,000	56,013	30,225	26,277	18.0	9.7	8.5	−1.7	2.48
1991	3,132,000	54,754	29,787	24,980	17.5	9.5	8.0	−1.0	2.51
1992	3,155,000	54,190	29,964	24,182	17.2	9.5	7.7	−0.4	2.49
1993	3,178,000	55,953	31,547	24,337	17.6	9.9	7.7	−0.5	2.47
1994	3,201,000	55,990	30,122	25,868	17.5	9.4	8.1	−0.9	2.44
1995	3,224,000	56,695	31,525	25,170	17.6	9.8	7.8	−0.7	2.40
1996	3,258,203	58,862	31,108	27,754	18.1	9.6	8.5	−1.1	2.36
1997	3,285,940	56,344	30,451	27,581	17.7	9.3	8.4	−1.4	2.33
1998	3,312,094	54,760	31,917	22,843	16.6	9.7	6.9	−0.5	2.29
1999	3,335,615	54,004	32,430	21,574	16.3	9.8	6.5	−1.4	2.27
2000	3,349,115	52,770	30,456	22,314	15.9	9.2	6.7	−3.1	2.24
2001	3,351,491	51,959	31,228	20,731	15.6	9.4	6.2	−4.4	2.22
2002	3,346,677	51,953	31,628	20,325	15.6	9.5	6.1	−5.8	2.21
2003	3,338,399	50,631	32,587	18,044	15.2	9.8	5.4	−6.3	2.19
2004	3,341,417	50,052	32,222	17,832	15.1	9.7	5.4	−5.7	2.17
2005	3,352,355	46,944	32,319	14,625	14.1	9.7	4.4	−4.1	2.16
2006	3,358,005	47,410	31,056	16,354	14.2	9.3	4.9	−3.4	2.14
2007	3,358,794	47,373	33,706	13,667	14.2	10.1	4.1	−1.7	2.13
2008	3,363,060	47,484	31,363	16,121	14.2	9.4	4.8	−1.5	2.11
2009	3,378,083	47,152	32,179	14,973	14.1	9.6	4.5	−1.2	2.09
2010	3,396,706	47,420	33,474	13,946	14.1	10.0	4.2	−0.6	2.08
2011	3,412,636	46,699	32,807	13,892	13.9	9.7	4.1	−0.8	2.06
2012	3,427,550	48,200	33,002	15,198	14.3	9.8	4.5	8.1	2.05
2013	3,442,033	48,681	32,795	15,886	14.2	9.5	4.7	−0.6	2.03
2014	3,457,315	48,368	32,120	16,248	14.0	9.4	4.6	−0.8	2.02
2015	3,472,590	48,926	32,967	15,959	14.1	9.5	4.6	−0.6	1.95
2016	3,486,152	47,049	34,274	12,775	13.5	9.8	3.7	−0.3	1.87
2017	3,496,713	43,036	33,173	9,863	12.3	9.5	2.8	1.2	1.71
2018	3,503,978	40,139	34,269	5,870	11.4	9.8	1.6	2.1	1.60
2019	3,507,770	37,468	34,807	2,661	10.6	9.9	0.7	2.7	1.50
2020	3,510,305	35,866	32,640	3,226	10.2	9.2	1.0	2.7	1.40
2021	3,508,363	34,597	41,729	−7,132	9.8	11.8	−2.0	5.4	1.34
2022	3,501,498	32,301	39,376	−7,075	9.1	11.1	−2.0	5.3	1.28
2023	3,496,400	31,381	34,677	−3,296	9.0	9.9	−0.9	−1.1	1.25
2024	3,491,764	29,899	35,956	–6,057	8.6	10.3	–1.7	0.41	1.19
2025	3,485,931	28,903	34,860	–5,957	8.3	10.0	–1.7	0.1	1.15

View source data.

=== Total fertility rate (1880–1899) ===
The total fertility rate is the number of children born per woman. It is based on fairly good data for the entire period. Sources: Our World In Data and Gapminder Foundation.

Years	1880	1881	1882	1883	1884	1885	1886	1887	1888	1889	1890
Total Fertility Rate in Uruguay	5.76	5.76	5.76	5.71	5.21	5.45	5.56	5.64	5.63	5.57	5.45

Years	1891	1892	1893	1894	1895	1896	1897	1898	1899
Total Fertility Rate in Uruguay	5.44	5.31	5.04	5.11	5.25	5.07	4.3	4.5	4.6

=== UN estimates ===
The Population Department of the United Nations prepared the following estimates for Uruguay.

Period	Live births per year	Deaths per year	Natural change per year	CBR*	CDR*	NC*	TFR*	IMR*	Life expectancy		
Period	Live births per year	Deaths per year	Natural change per year	CBR*	CDR*	NC*	TFR*	IMR*	total	males	females
1950–1955	49,000	24,000	25,000	21.2	10.5	10.7	2.73	57	66.0	63.3	69.3
1955–1960	54,000	25,000	29,000	21.9	10.0	11.9	2.83	53	67.0	64.2	70.3
1960–1965	57,000	25,000	32,000	21.9	9.5	12.4	2.90	48	68.3	65.3	71.5
1965–1970	56,000	26,000	30,000	20.5	9.6	10.8	2.80	47	68.5	65.5	71.8
1970–1975	60,000	28,000	32,000	21.1	10.0	11.1	3.00	46	68.7	65.6	72.1
1975–1980	58,000	29,000	29,000	20.2	10.1	10.1	2.89	42	69.5	66.3	73.1
1980–1985	54,000	29,000	25,000	18.3	9.8	8.5	2.57	34	70.9	67.6	74.5
1985–1990	56,000	30,000	26,000	18.2	9.8	8.4	2.53	23	72.1	68.6	75.7
1990–1995	58,000	31,000	27,000	18.2	9.7	8.5	2.49	20	73.0	69.2	76.8
1995–2000	55,000	31,000	24,000	16.9	9.5	7.4	2.30	16	74.2	70.4	77.9
2000–2005	53,000	31,000	22,000	15.9	9.5	6.5	2.20	14	75.3	71.6	78.9
2005–2010	51,000	31,000	20,000	15.1	9.3	5.8	2.12	13	76.4	72.7	79.9
2010–2015	49,000	32,000	17,000	14.5	9.4	5.1	2.05	11	77.1	73.6	80.5
2015–2020	49,000	32,000	17,000	14.1	9.3	4.8	2.00	10	77.9	74.5	81.1
* CBR = crude birth rate (per 1000); CDR = crude death rate (per 1000); NC = natural change (per 1000); IMR = infant mortality rate per 1000 births; TFR = total fertility rate (number of children per woman)

=== Life expectancy ===
Life expectancy in Uruguay since 1900

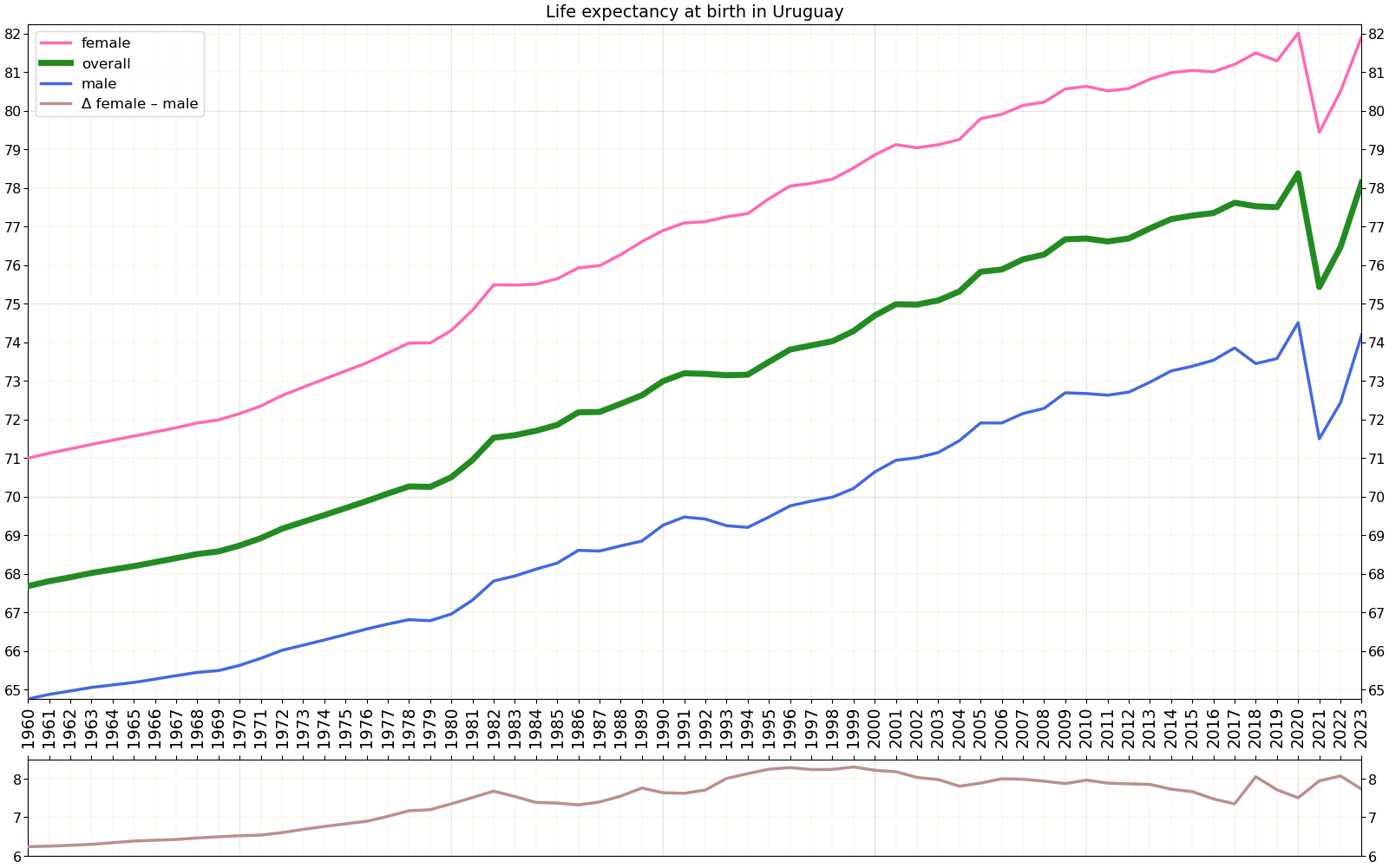
Life expectancy in Uruguay since 1960 by gender

== Ethnic groups ==
Racial groups in Uruguay as principal ancestry (2023 census)
1. Whites 88 (78.5%)
2. Blacks 10.6 (9.46%)
3. Indigenous 6.4 (5.71%)
4. East Asians 0.7 (0.62%)
5. Other/none 6.4 (5.71%)

Most Uruguayans are descended from colonial-era settlers and immigrants from Europe with almost 88% of the population being of either sole or partial European descent, with a majority of these being Spaniards, followed closely by Italians, and smaller numbers of French, Germans, Portuguese, British (English or Scots), Irish, Swiss, Russians, Poles, Bulgarians, Hungarians, Ukrainians, Lithuanians, Estonians, Latvians, Swedes, Danes, Dutch, Belgians, Austrians, Croats, Serbs, Greeks and others.

There are also smaller numbers of Western Asian (Turks, Israelis, and Lebanese) and South Caucasus ethnic groups (Armenians, Georgians, and Azeris).

Many Swiss settlements (colonias or "colonies"), such as Colonia Suiza, Colonia Valdense and Nueva Helvecia, were founded in the department of Colonia. Also, there are towns founded by early British settlers, such as Conchillas and Barker. A Russian colony called San Javier was founded in the 1910s in the department of Río Negro. There are also Mennonite colonies in the department of Río Negro and in the department of Canelones.

Many of the European immigrants arrived in the late 19th century and have heavily influenced the architecture and culture of Montevideo and other major cities. For this reason, Montevideo and life within the city are very reminiscent of Western Europe.

The rest of the Uruguayan population is Black/Afro-Uruguayan of African descent and about 1 or 2% are of Asian descent, mostly are Lebanese/Syrian Arab, and Chinese or Japanese ancestry.

Amerindians descendants make up a small population in the Rural North region, with Mestizos making up 6.4% of the population.

Uruguay has the highest percentage of self-identified White Latin Americans of any country in Latin America, however genetic studies have found that over a third of Uruguayans in the samples studied had Amerindian admixture.

== Emigration ==
During the past four decades, an estimated 500,000 Uruguayans had emigrated, principally to Brazil, Argentina and Europe. (Argentina is the main destination for Uruguayans, but they are also drawn to Spain, the United Kingdom, Italy, France and Germany.) Other Uruguayans went to various countries in Europe, Australia and the USA.

Neighboring ties and short distances between Uruguayan cities and Argentine capital Buenos Aires, have drawn a path of success for Uruguayans who settled in the neighbor country and became famous and locally accepted. Some famous Uruguayans who excelled in Argentina are entrepreneur and financier Juan Navarro, sports journalist Victor Hugo Morales, singer and actress Natalia Oreiro, soccer players Antonio Alzamendi, Enzo Francescoli and Carlos Goyen, actor Daniel Hendler, actress China Zorrilla, entertainer Carlos Perciavalle and former playboy and journalist Luis César Avilés.

Emigration to the United States also rose at the beginning of the century, but remains a small part of the US population. The majority of Uruguayans in the US live in New York City, New Jersey, Washington, D.C., Florida, and urban areas of California.

== Religion ==
Religion in Uruguay
Religion	Percent
Roman Catholic	47.1%
Nondenominational	23.2%
Agnostic or Atheist	17.2%
Non-Catholic Christian	11.1%
Other	1.1%
Jewish	0.3%

Uruguay has no official religion, church and state are officially separated, and religious freedom is guaranteed. A 2008 survey by the National Statistics Institute gave Catholicism as the main religion, with 45.7% of the population, 9.0% are non-Catholic Christians, 0.6% are Animists or Umbandists (an Afro-Brazilian religion) and 0.4% Jewish. 30.1% reported believing in a god, but not belonging to any religion, while 14% were Atheist or Agnostic. Among the sizeable Armenian community in Montevideo the dominant religion is Christianity, specifically Armenian Apostolic.

Political observers consider Uruguay the most secular country in the Americas. Uruguay's secularization began with the relatively minor role of the church in the colonial era, compared with other parts of the Spanish Empire. The small numbers of Uruguay's Indians and their fierce resistance to proselytism reduced the influence of the ecclesiastical authorities.

After independence, anticlerical ideas spread to Uruguay, particularly from France, further eroding the influence of the church. In 1837, civil marriage was recognized and in 1861 the state took over the running of public cemeteries. In 1907, divorce was legalized and in 1909, all religious instruction was banned from state schools. Under the influence of the Colorado reformer José Batlle y Ordóñez (1903–1911) complete separation of church and state was introduced with the new constitution of 1917.

== See also ==
- Emigration from Uruguay
- Immigration to Uruguay
- Uruguayan people
