= Peru–Uruguay relations =

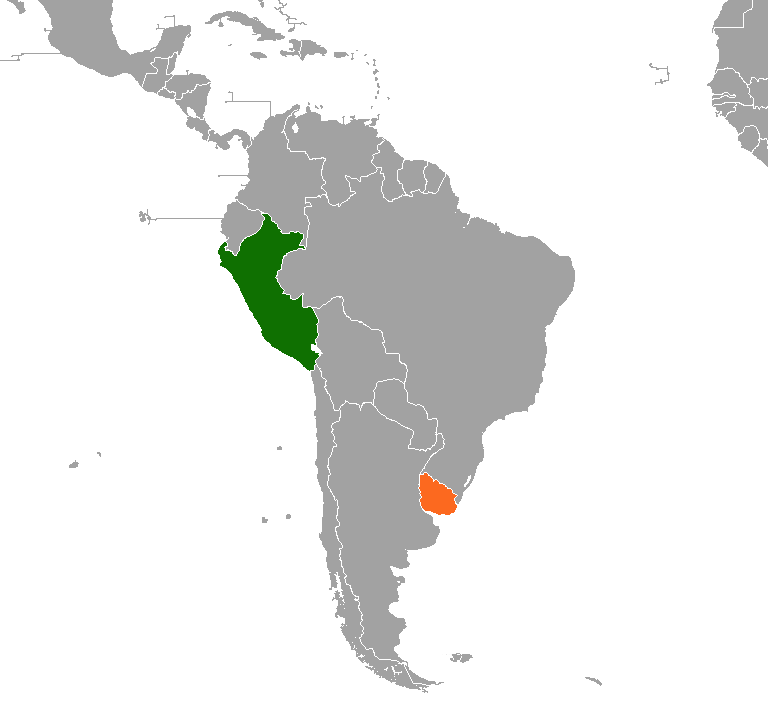
- Peru: Uruguay

Diplomatic mission
- Embassy of Peru, Montevideo: Embassy of Uruguay, Lima

Peru–Uruguay relations are the diplomatic relations between the Republic of Peru and the Oriental Republic of Uruguay. Both nations are members of the Cairns Group, Community of Latin American and Caribbean States, Group of 77, Latin American Integration Association, Organization of American States, Organization of Ibero-American States and the United Nations.

== History ==
Both Peru and Uruguay share a common history in the fact that both nations were once part of the Spanish Empire. During the Spanish colonial period, Peru was governed by the Viceroyalty of Peru in Lima while Uruguay was then part of the Viceroyalty of the Río de la Plata and administered from Buenos Aires. Diplomatic relations between Peru and Uruguay where established in 1849 and Peru appointed a consul in Montevideo. In 1900, Peru appointed its first minister resident in Montevideo and the Peruvian diplomatic legation in Montevideo was upgraded to an embassy in 1946.

In July 2011, Uruguayan President José Mujica paid a visit to Peru to attend the inauguration of President Ollanta Humala. In November 2018, former Peruvian President Alan García took refuge in the Uruguayan embassy in Lima and asked for asylum in Uruguay. García was under investigation for allegedly receiving bribes during the construction of an electric train in Lima by Brazilian company Odebrecht. Two weeks later, Uruguay rejected his asylum petition and García vacated the embassy.

Both nations partake in various multilateral South American summits and have had several high-level bilateral meetings.

== Bilateral agreements ==
Both nations have signed several bilateral agreements such as a Consular Agreement (1885); Extradition Treaty (1885); Agreement on the Exchange of Publications (1889); Agreement on the Validity of Academic Degrees (1918); Agreement for Cultural Exchanges (1985); Agreement for the International Return of Abducted Children (1989); Agreement in Scientific and Technical Cooperation (1998); Agreement for the Prevention of the Improper Use and Suppression of Illicit Traffic in Narcotic Drugs, Psychotropic Substances and Related Crimes, their Precursors and Essential Chemical Products (1999); Air Transportation Agreement (2002); Agreement on Scientific, Technological and Logistics Cooperation in Antarctic Matters (2002); Memorandum of Understanding for the Promotion of Trade, Tourism and Investments (2008); Agreement of Cooperation in Migratory Matters (2016); and a Treaty of Mutual Legal Assistance in Criminal Matters (2016).

== Transportation ==
There are direct flights between both nations with LATAM Perú.

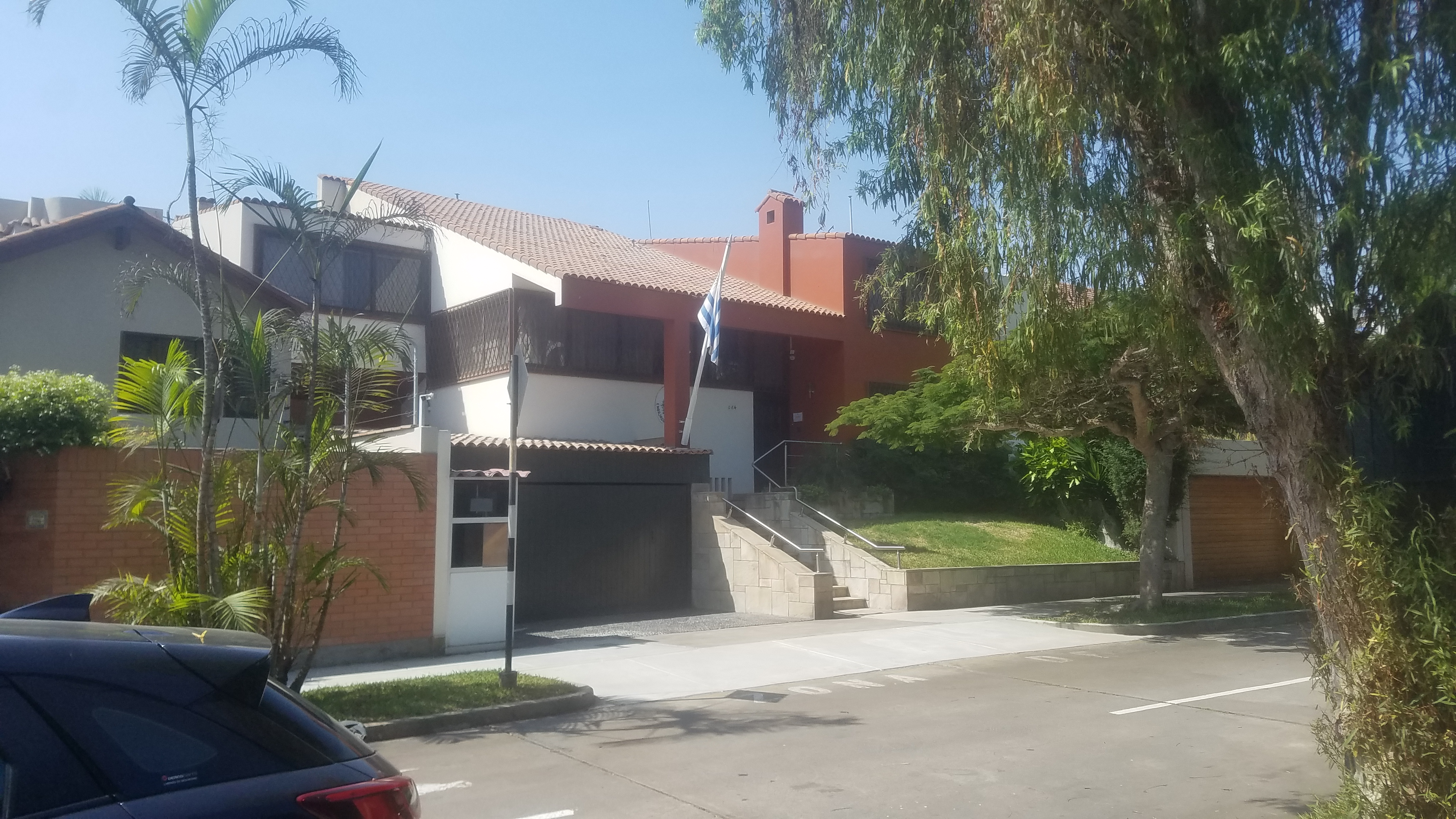
Embassy of Uruguay in Lima

== Resident diplomatic missions ==
- Peru has an embassy in Montevideo.
- Uruguay has an embassy in Lima.

== See also ==
- Peruvians in Uruguay
- List of ambassadors of Peru to Uruguay
- List of ambassadors of Uruguay to Peru
