= Bolivian Uruguayans =

Bolivian Uruguayans Uruguayos Bolivianos
Total population
- 377 (2011 census)

Languages
- Rioplatense Spanish and Bolivian Spanish

Related ethnic groups
- Bolivian diaspora

Bolivian Uruguayans are people born in Bolivia who live in Uruguay or Uruguay-born people of Bolivian descent.

== Overview ==
Many Bolivian-born people live in Uruguay, for a number of reasons. Both countries share the Spanish language; their historical origins are common (part of the Viceroyalty of the River Plate, Spanish Empire); there is no need for special migration documents, and circulation is relatively easy. Uruguay is a very small, quiet country, with wide beaches on the Atlantic Ocean, some well-off Bolivians choose Uruguay as their holiday destination, a trend that is expected to grow in the near future. Other Bolivians of a lower social condition come to Uruguay in search of job opportunities, as part of a big inflow of Latin Americans into Uruguay.

According to the 2011 Uruguayan census, 377 people who declared Bolivia as their country of birth. As of 2013, there are just 30 Bolivian citizens registered in the Uruguayan social security; at the same time, there is a worrying trend of illegal immigration in search for work as domestic servants.

== Notable people ==
- Jaime de Zudáñez (1772–1832), lawyer and politician.
- Hernán Siles Zuazo (1914–1996), politician, three times President of Bolivia, died in Uruguay.

== See also ==
- Bolivia–Uruguay relations
- Uruguayans in Bolivia
- Bolivian diaspora
- Immigration to Uruguay
