= Cuban Uruguayans =

Total population
- 456 (2011 Uruguayan Census)

Languages
- Cuban Spanish and Rioplatense Spanish

Cuban Uruguayans are people born in Cuba who live in Uruguay, or Uruguayan-born people of Cuban descent. As of 2019, there were 24,485 Cubans living in Uruguay.

== Overview ==
There are some Cuban-born persons living in Uruguay, for a number of reasons. Both countries share the Spanish language; their historical origins are common (part of the Spanish Empire). Uruguay is a very small, quiet country, where Cuban exiles have looked for a new opportunity as part of a big inflow of Latin Americans coming to Uruguay.

The 2011 Uruguayan census revealed 456 people declaring Cuba as their country of birth. As of 2013, there are just 6 Cubans registered in the Uruguayan social security. Official sources show that over 1,700 Cubans entered Uruguay in 2016. In 2018, 12,648 Cubans entered to Uruguay and left 4,005. As of December 2025, over 8,000 Cuban citizens applied for Uruguayan residency.

There is a presence of Cuban ophthalmologists working for the Uruguayan national health system.

Cubans residing in Uruguay run their own association since 1989.

== Notable people ==
- Ernesto Talvi (born 1957), son of a Cuban mother, is an economist and presidential candidate of the Colorado Party

== See also ==
- Cuba–Uruguay relations
- Uruguayans in Cuba
- Immigration to Uruguay
