= Juan Pedro Amestoy =

Uruguayan accountant, politician and ambassador

Juan Pedro Amestoy Borteiro

President of the Central Bank of Uruguay.
- In office 1 March 1972 – 4 June 1973
- Preceded by: Jorge Echeverría
- Succeeded by: Carlos Ricchi

Minister of Industry and Commerce
- In office 2 April 1971 – 1 March 1972
- Preceded by: Julio María Sanguinetti
- Succeeded by: Jorge Echeverría Leúnda

Personal details
- Born: Juan Pedro Amestoy Borteiro; 20 September 1925 Montevideo, Uruguay
- Died: 12 February 2010 (aged 84) Montevideo, Uruguay
- Education: University of the Republic
- Occupation: Politician, accountant, ambassador

Juan Pedro Amestoy Borteiro (1925–2010) was a Uruguayan accountant, politician and ambassador. He was born in Montevideo, Uruguay on September 20, 1925 and died on February 12, 2010.

== Education and career ==
Amestoy graduated from the Faculty of Economics and Management, University of the Republic in 1957 with degree in public accounting.

In the public service he held the positions of advisor to the Ministry of Finance (1959-1966), Minister of Industry and Trade in 1971–1972, at the end of the presidency of Jorge Pacheco Areco. Later, at the beginning of the presidency of Juan Maria Bordaberry, he served as the president of Central Bank of Uruguay (1972-1973).

He performed for 21 years in the field of diplomacy, serving as Ambassador of Uruguay in Peru (1974-1977), Egypt (1977-1980), USSR (1982-1987) and Mexico (1990-1995). He was also active at the Ministry of Foreign Affairs, as Director of International Economic Affairs (1980-1982) and Chief Technical and Administrative Affairs (1988-1990).

In the area of teaching, he was Professor of Practical Courses in Finance and Public Administration (1958-1960) and Member of the Examiners Councils of Public Finance and Customs Law and International Economic Policy (1958-1961).

At the international level he was an official adviser to the Economic Commission for Latin America (CEPAL (1966-1970) and adviser to the American Council of Commerce and Production (CICYP) (1964-1966).

He authored Stalin versus Trotsky-Largo camino hacia un asesinato (Stalin versus Trotsky-Long road to an assassination) (May 2004).
