= Eduardo Fernández (guitarist) =

Eduardo Fernández (born 1952) is a Uruguayan classical guitarist, teacher and arranger-composer. He received prizes in the 1972 Porto Alegre and 1975 Radio France competitions, won the Premio Andrés Segovia in 1975 and debuted in New York in 1977. After his 1983 London debut, Fernández was signed by Decca Records. His textbook has been published in English as Technique, Mechanism, Learning (2002).

== Selected discography ==
- Bach, J.S.: Lute Suites (2 CDs) 1989 Decca Music Group Limited
- Guitar Concerti Manuel Ponce, Heitor Villa-Lobos, Jaurés Lamarque Pons. ECO, conducted Enrique García Asensio. Decca 1990
- The World of The Spanish Guitar Decca compilation 1992
- Avant-garde guitar. Takemitsu: All in Twilight. Leo Brouwer: La espiral eterna. Britten: Nocturnal after John Dowland. Berio: Sequenza XI. Decca

== Articles ==
- Interview (1984), by Paul Magnussen
