= Uruguayan Bolivians =

Uruguayan Bolivians Bolivianos Uruguayos
Total population
- unknown

Regions with significant populations
- Santa Cruz

Languages
- Uruguayan Spanish · Bolivian Spanish

Religion
- unknown

Related ethnic groups
- Uruguayan diaspora

Uruguayan Bolivians are people born in Uruguay who live in Bolivia, or Bolivian-born people of Uruguayan descent.

Many Uruguayan-born persons live in Bolivia, for a number of reasons. Both countries share the Spanish language; the historical origins of both nations is common (part of the Spanish Empire until the early 19th century); both countries are members of MERCOSUR, there is no need of special migration documents, and geographical vicinity makes circulation easy.

In the decade of the 2010s several Uruguayan investors purchased productive land in Bolivia.

There is an Association of Uruguayan Residents in Santa Cruz de la Sierra.

== Notable people ==
Past

- Julián Álvarez (1788–1843), lawyer and politician, studied law at the University of Charcas
- Mateo Vidal (1780-1855), priest and politician, studied divinity at the University of Charcas

Present

- Bryan Aldave, footballer
- Juan Daniel Salaberry, footballer

== See also ==
- Bolivia–Uruguay relations
- Bolivians in Uruguay
- Emigration from Uruguay
