= List of ambassadors of Peru to Uruguay =

Ambassador of Peru to the Oriental Republic of Uruguay
- Great Seal of Peru
- Ministry of Foreign Affairs; Obligado 1384, Montevideo
- Appointer: The president of Peru
- Inaugural holder: Buenaventura Seoane
- Formation: 1861
- Website: Embassy of Peru in Uruguay

The extraordinary and plenipotentiary ambassador of Peru to the Oriental Republic of Uruguay is the official representative of the Republic of Peru to the Oriental Republic of Uruguay. The ambassador also acts as the representative of Peru to ALADI and Mercosur.

Both countries established relations in 1849, when Peru sent Consul José María Civils to Montevideo. Both countries have developed stable relations, although it was only in 1922 that the first legal instrument between both nations was successfully signed.

== List of representatives ==
| Name | Portrait | Term begin | Term end | President | Notes |
|---|---|---|---|---|---|
| Buenaventura Seoane | | 1861 | 1862 | Ramón Castilla | Envoy Extraordinary and Minister Plenipotentiary of Peru in Argentina, Uruguay and Paraguay |
| Buenaventura Seoane | | 1862 | 1862 | Ramón Castilla | Resident Minister in the Republic of Uruguay, the Empire of Brazil and Paraguay |
| Benigno González Vigil | | 1865 | 1868 | Mariano Ignacio Prado | Chargé d'affaires in Brazil, Argentina and Uruguay |
| José María La Torre Bueno | | 1869 | 1869 | Luis La Puerta | Resident Minister of Peru in Argentina and in Uruguay |
| Ezequiel Vega | | 1869 | 1869 | José Balta | Legation Secretary Second Class |
| Víctor Estensoro | | 1869 | 1869 | José Balta | Legation Attaché |
| Luis Mesones | | 1869 | 1872 | José Balta | Envoy Extraordinary and Minister Plenipotentiary in Brazil, Uruguay and Argentina |
| Emilio Armero | | 1869 | 1872 | José Balta | 2nd Class Secretary at the Legation accredited to Brazil, Uruguay and Argentina |
| Ismael de la Quintana Elias | | 1869 | 1872 | José Balta | Legation Attaché |
| José Toribio Dorado | | 1869 | 1872 | José Balta | Legation Attaché |
| Joaquín Delgado | | 1869 | 1872 | José Balta | Ad honorem attaché |
| Manuel Irigoyen Larrea | | 1873 | 1873 | Manuel Pardo | Resident minister to Brazil, Uruguay and Argentina |
| Manuel Diez Canseco Corbacho | | 1873 | 1873 | Manuel Pardo | 1st Class Secretary |
| Manuel Irigoyen Larrea | | 1874 | 1874 | Manuel Pardo | Envoy Extraordinary and Minister Plenipotentiary in Brazil, Uruguay and Argentina |
| Octavio Diez Canseco | | 1874 | 1874 | Manuel Pardo | Legation Attaché |
| Andrés La Torre | | 1874 | 1874 | Manuel Pardo | Legation Attaché |
| Manuel Diez Canseco Corbacho | | 1874 | 1874 | Manuel Pardo | 1st Class Secretary |
| Aníbal Víctor de la Torre y Vidaurre | | 1878 | 1880 | Mariano Ignacio Prado | Envoy Extraordinary and Minister Plenipotentiary in Brazil, Uruguay and Argentina |
| Julio F. Sandoval | | 1878 | 1880 | Mariano Ignacio Prado | Legation Attaché |
| Oswaldo Igarza y Sarrio | | 1878 | 1880 | Mariano Ignacio Prado | 1st Class Secretary |
| Pedro Antonio de la Torre | | 1878 | 1880 | Mariano Ignacio Prado | Legation Attaché |
| Evaristo Gómez Sánchez y Benavides | | 1880 | 1881 | Nicolás de Piérola | Envoy Extraordinary and Minister Plenipotentiary in Brazil, Uruguay and Argentina |
| Ermel Julio Rospigliosi | | 1880 | 1881 | Nicolás de Piérola | 1st Class Secretary |
| Celso Víctor Gómez Sánchez | | 1880 | 1881 | Nicolás de Piérola | Legation Attaché |
| Manuel Francisco Gómez Sánchez | | 1880 | 1881 | Nicolás de Piérola | Legation Attaché |
| Carlos Maria Elías y de la Quintana | | 1882 | 1882 | Miguel Iglesias | Envoy Extraordinary and Minister Plenipotentiary in Brazil, Uruguay and Argentina |
| Juan Luna | | 1884 | 1884 | Miguel Iglesias | Envoy Extraordinary and Minister Plenipotentiary in Brazil, Uruguay and Argentina |
| Pedro Paz Soldán y Unanue | | 1884 | 1884 | Miguel Iglesias | Resident minister to Brazil, Uruguay and Argentina |
| Germán Aramburú | | 1884 | 1884 | Miguel Iglesias | 2nd Class Secretary |
| Enrique Tejeda | | 1884 | 1884 | Miguel Iglesias | Legation attaché |
| Manuel María Rivas Pereira | | 1887 | 1887 | Andrés Avelino Cáceres | |
| Carlos Arosemena y Jofré | | 1887 | 1887 | Andrés Avelino Cáceres | 2nd Class Secretary |
| Cesáreo Chacaltana Reyes | | 1888 | 1888 | Andrés Avelino Cáceres | Diplomatic mission to Argentina, Brazil and Uruguay |
| Guillermo Seoane | | 1892 | 1892 | Remigio Morales Bermúdez | Envoy Extraordinary and Minister Plenipotentiary in Argentina and Uruguay |
| Pedro Antonio de La Torre | | 1892 | 1892 | Remigio Morales Bermúdez | 2nd Class Secretary |
| Alberto Ulloa Cisneros | | 1893 | 1893 | Remigio Morales Bermúdez | Resident minister in Argentina and Uruguay |
| Víctor Eguiguren | | 1900 | 1900 | Eduardo López de Romaña | Envoy Extraordinary and Minister Plenipotentiary |
| Augusto Durand Maldonado | | | | Eduardo López de Romaña | Envoy Extraordinary and Minister Plenipotentiary |
| Alejandro de la Fuente | | 1918 | 1918 | José Pardo y Barreda | Chargé d'affairs |
| Víctor Andrés Belaúnde | | 1919 | 1919 | José Pardo y Barreda | Envoy Extraordinary and Minister Plenipotentiary |
| Juan Pedro Paz-Soldán | | 1924 | 1926 | Augusto B. Leguía | Chargé d'affairs |
| Enrique Bustamante y Ballivián | | 1926 | 1932 | Augusto B. Leguía | Chargé d'affairs |
| Felipe Barreda y Laos | | 1933 | 1933 | Óscar R. Benavides | Ambassador Extraordinary and Minister Plenipotentiary |
| Eduardo Garland | | 1933 | 1933 | Óscar R. Benavides | Chargé d'affairs |
| Luis Fernán Cisneros | | 1934 | 1939 | Óscar R. Benavides | Envoy Extraordinary and Minister Plenipotentiary |
| José Luis Bustamante y Rivero | | 1939 | 1942 | Manuel Prado Ugarteche | Envoy Extraordinary and Minister Plenipotentiary |
| Ricardo Boza Aizcorbe | | 1942 | 1945 | Manuel Prado Ugarteche | Envoy Extraordinary and Minister Plenipotentiary |
| Manuel Dañino Cantuarias | | 1943 | 1943 | Manuel Prado Ugarteche | Chargé d'affairs |
| Carlos Valera | | 1944 | 1944 | Manuel Prado Ugarteche | Chargé d'affairs |
| José V. Larrabure Price | | 1945 | 1945 | Manuel Prado Ugarteche | Chargé d'affairs |
| Pablo Abril de Vivero | | 1946 | 1946 | José Luis Bustamante y Rivero | Ambassador Extraordinary and Minister Plenipotentiary |
| José V. Larrabure Price | | 1946 | 1946 | José Luis Bustamante y Rivero | Chargé d'affairs |
| Hernán C. Bellido | | 1947 | 1949 | José Luis Bustamante y Rivero | Ambassador Extraordinary and Minister Plenipotentiary |
| José V. Larrabure Price | | 1947 | 1949 | José Luis Bustamante y Rivero | Chargé d'affairs |
| José V. Larrabure Price | | 1949 | 1949 | Manuel A. Odría | Chargé d'affairs |
| Emilio Romero Padilla | | 1951 | 1952 | Manuel A. Odría | Ambassador Extraordinary and Minister Plenipotentiary |
| Fernán Cisnero Diez Canseco | | 1951 | 1952 | Manuel A. Odría | Chargé d'affairs |
| Enrique Goytisolo Bolognesi | | 1952 | 1954 | Manuel A. Odría | Ambassador Extraordinary and Minister Plenipotentiary |
| Fernán Cisnero Diez Canseco | | 1952 | 1954 | Manuel A. Odría | Chargé d'affairs |
| Edgardo Rebagliati | | 1954 | 1954 | Manuel A. Odría | Ambassador Extraordinary and Minister Plenipotentiary |
| Fernán Cisnero Diez Canseco | | 1954 | 1954 | Manuel A. Odría | Chargé d'affairs |
| Gonzalo N. de Arámburu | | 1955 | 1961 | Manuel A. Odría | Ambassador Extraordinary and Minister Plenipotentiary |
| Fernán Cisnero Diez Canseco | | 1955 | 1961 | Manuel A. Odría | Chargé d'affairs |
| Manuel Carpio Rivero | | 1961 | 1962 | Manuel Prado Ugarteche | Ambassador Extraordinary and Minister Plenipotentiary |
| Alejandro Deústua Arróspide | | 1961 | 1962 | Manuel Prado Ugarteche | Chargé d'affairs |
| Julio Vargas-Prada | | 1963 | 1963 | Nicolás Lindley López | Ambassador Extraordinary and Minister Plenipotentiary |
| Alejandro Deústua Arróspide | | 1963 | 1963 | Nicolás Lindley López | Chargé d'affairs |
| Claudio Enrique Sosa | | 1964 | 1964 | Fernando Belaúnde | Chargé d'affairs |
| Vicente Cerro Cebrián | | 1965 | 1968 | Fernando Belaúnde | Ambassador Extraordinary and Minister Plenipotentiary |
| Juan de la Piedra | | 1965 | 1968 | Fernando Belaúnde | Chargé d'affairs |
| Alberto Mac Lean Urzúa | | 1965 | 1968 | Fernando Belaúnde | Chargé d'affairs |
| Adhemar Montagne | | 1968 | 1969 | Juan Velasco Alvarado | Ambassador Extraordinary and Minister Plenipotentiary |
| Alberto Mac Lean Urzúa | | 1968 | 1969 | Juan Velasco Alvarado | Chargé d'affairs |
| Max de la Fuente Locker | | 1969 | 1970 | Juan Velasco Alvarado | Ambassador Extraordinary and Minister Plenipotentiary |
| Luis Sabogal Pérez Romero | | 1969 | 1970 | Juan Velasco Alvarado | Chargé d'affairs |
| Julio Ego-Aguirre Álvarez | | 1970 | 1972 | Juan Velasco Alvarado | Ambassador Extraordinary and Minister Plenipotentiary |
| Juan de la Piedra Villalonga | | 1970 | 1972 | Juan Velasco Alvarado | Chargé d'affairs |
| Hugo de Zela | | 1971 | 1971 | Juan Velasco Alvarado | Chargé d'affairs |
| Fernán Cisneros Diez-Canseco | | 1972 | 1975 | Juan Velasco Alvarado | Ambassador Extraordinary and Minister Plenipotentiary |
| Hugo de Zela | | 1972 | 1975 | Juan Velasco Alvarado | Chargé d'affairs |
| René Hooper-López | | 1975 | 1977 | Francisco Morales Bermúdez | Ambassador Extraordinary and Minister Plenipotentiary and Permanent Representative in LAFTA |
| Gustavo S. Lembcke | | 1975 | 1977 | Francisco Morales Bermúdez | Chargé d'affairs |
| Alberto MacLean Urzua | | 1977 | 1980 | Francisco Morales Bermúdez | Ambassador Extraordinary and Minister Plenipotentiary |
| Gonzalo Bedoya Delboy | | 1977 | 1980 | Francisco Morales Bermúdez | Chargé d'affairs |
| Hugo de Zela | | 1980 | 1984 | Fernando Belaúnde | Ambassador Extraordinary and Minister Plenipotentiary |
| Gonzalo Bedoya Delboy | | 1980 | 1984 | Fernando Belaúnde | Chargé d'affairs |
| Luis Beltroy Patrón | | 1983 | 1983 | Fernando Belaúnde | Chargé d'affairs |
| Eduardo Barandiarán Barandiarán | | 1983 | 1983 | Fernando Belaúnde | Chargé d'affairs |
| Luis Chávez Godoy | | 1985 | 1987 | Alan García | Ambassador |
| Jorge Abarca del Carpio | | 1985 | 1987 | Alan García | Chargé d'affairs |
| Jorge del Campo Vidal | | 1987 | 1991 | Alan García | Ambassador |
| Jorge Abarca del Carpio | | 1987 | 1991 | Alan García | Chargé d'affairs |
| Carlos Alberto Yrigoyen Forno | | 1988 | 1988 | Alan García | Chargé d'affairs |
| Roger Eloy Loayza Saavedra | | 1992 | 1992 | Alberto Fujimori | Chargé d'affairs |
| Carlos Alberto Yrigoyen Forno | | 1992 | 1992 | Alberto Fujimori | Chargé d'affairs |
| Nilo Figueroa Cortavarría | | 1992 | 1992 | Alberto Fujimori | Chargé d'affairs |
| Guillermo Fernández-Cornejo | | 1992 | 1992 | Alberto Fujimori | Ambassador and representative to ALADI |
| José Carlos Dávila Pessagno | | 1993 | 1995 | Alberto Fujimori | Alternate representative to ALADI |
| Guillermo del Solar Rojas | | 1995 | 1997 | Alberto Fujimori | Ambassador and representative to ALADI |
| Efraín Saavedra Barrera | | 1995 | 1997 | Alberto Fujimori | Chargé d'affairs |
| Julio Balbuena López-Alfaro | | 1998 | 1998 | Alberto Fujimori | Ambassador |
| Eduardo Chavarri García | | 1998 | 1998 | Alberto Fujimori | Chargé d'affairs |
| Carlos Higueras Ramos | | 1999 | 2001 | Alberto Fujimori | Ambassador |
| Carlos Vallejo Martel | | 1999 | 2001 | Alberto Fujimori | Chargé d'affairs |
| William Lutgardo Belevan McBride | | 2002 | 2006 | Alejandro Toledo | Ambassador |
| Eric Anderson Machado | | 2002 | 2006 | Alejandro Toledo | Chargé d'affairs |
| Max Juan de la Fuente Brem | | 2007 | 2009 | Alan García | Ambassador |
| Carlos Adelino Franco Cortez | | 2009 | 2010 | Alan García | Ambassador |
| José Emilio Romero Cevallos | | 2010 | 2011 | Alan García | Ambassador |
| Aída García Naranjo | | 2012 | 2014 | Ollanta Humala | Ambassador |
| Augusto Arzubiaga Scheuch | | 2014 | 2020 | Ollanta Humala | Ambassador |
| Marco Vinicio Balarezo Lizarzaburú | | August 12, 2020 | 2026 | Francisco Sagasti | Ambassador |

== See also ==
- List of ambassadors of Uruguay to Peru
