= Immigration to Uruguay =

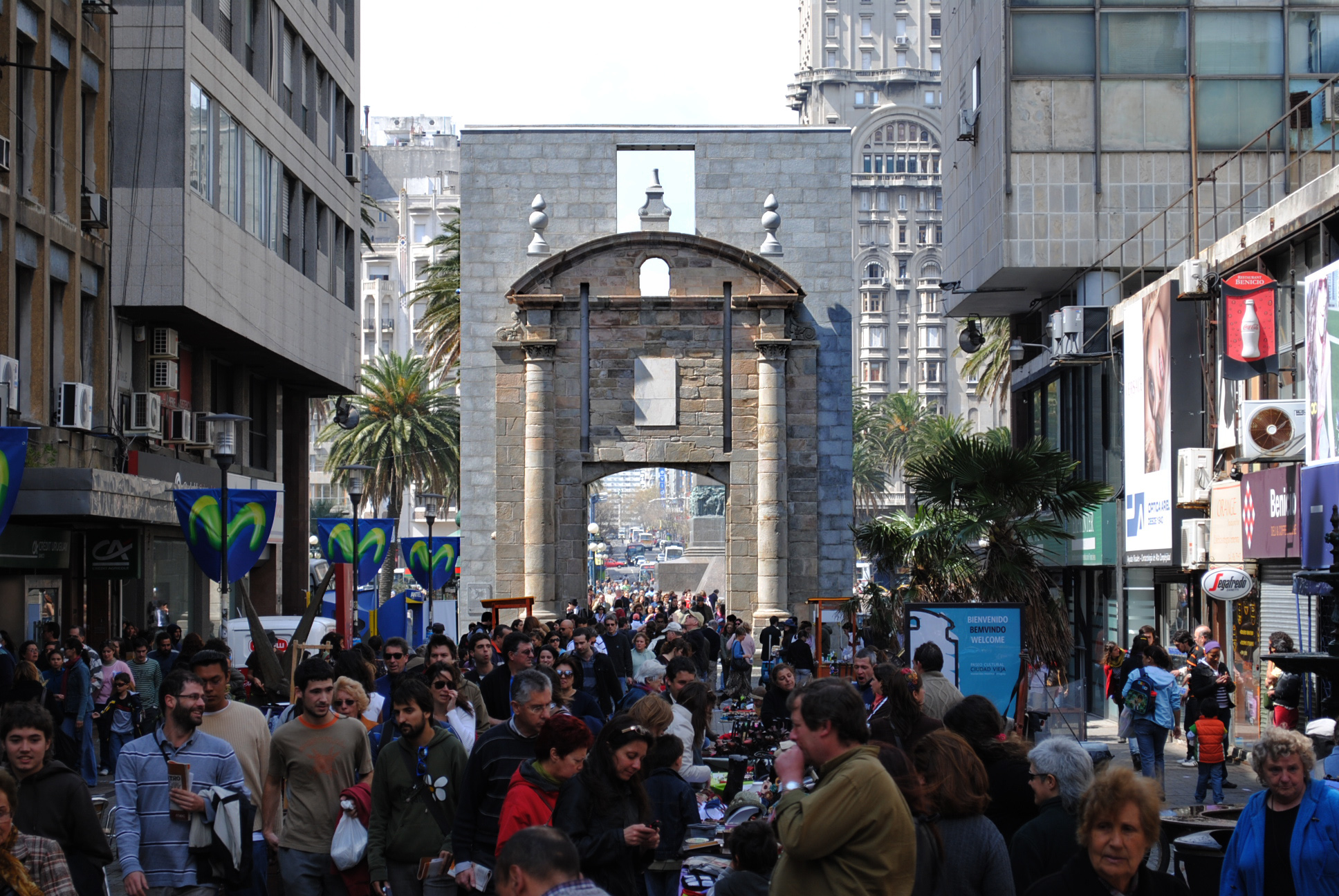
Uruguayan people, a melting pot.

Immigration to Uruguay began in several millennia BCE with the arrival of different populations from Asia to the Americas through Beringia, according to the most accepted theories, and were slowly populating the Americas. The most recent waves of immigrants started with the arrival of Spaniards in the 16th century, during the colonial period, to what was then known as the Banda Oriental.

Throughout its history, Uruguay has experienced massive waves of immigration from all around the world, specifically from the European continent, and today 90–95% of the Uruguayan population has European ancestry. The largest of these waves of immigration occurred between the last third of the 19th century and World War II, when the whole European continent was in turmoil. The largest groups of immigrants in Uruguay are the Spanish and Italians, both establishing the backbone of modern-day Uruguayan culture and society.

== Overview ==
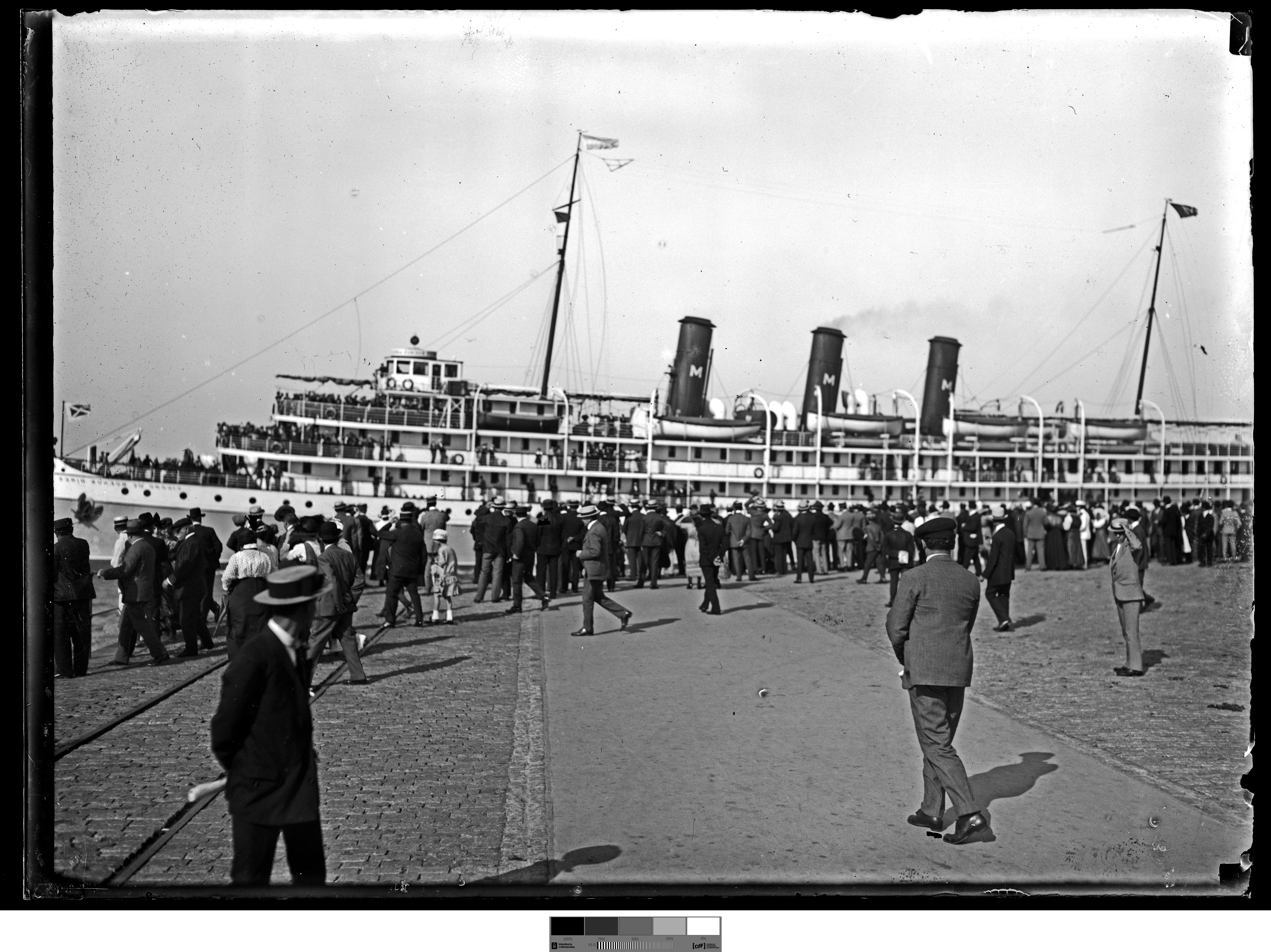
The port of Montevideo served as the primary gateway for immigrants arriving during the significant migratory waves of the 19th and 20th centuries

Uruguay is a multi-ethnic nation formed by the combination of different groups over five centuries. The territory of present-day Uruguay was populated by indigenous peoples for several millennia before the Spanish conquest in the 16th century. However, with the arrival of European conquistadors, their numbers dwindled due to disease, conflict, and forced displacement. In April 1831, with the country already an independent state, government troops—under the command of President Fructuoso Rivera—massacred the few remaining indigenous people in the Salsipuedes Massacre. As a result, combined with generations of intermarriage, assimilation, and several waves of massive European immigration, the identity of Uruguay's indigenous peoples was largely erased.

Throughout the 19th century and the first half of the 20th, Uruguay boasted the highest proportion of immigrant population in South America, with a majority hailing from Southern Europe. This influx significantly impacted the country's demographics, with foreign-born residents accounting for a remarkable 30% of the population in 1860 and 17% around 1910. Beginning in the second half of the 19th century, there has been gradual European immigration from several countries, which had its peak between 1870 and 1920; back then, the Villa del Cerro neighbourhood in Montevideo was characteristically populated by immigrants.

== History ==
=== Colonial period ===
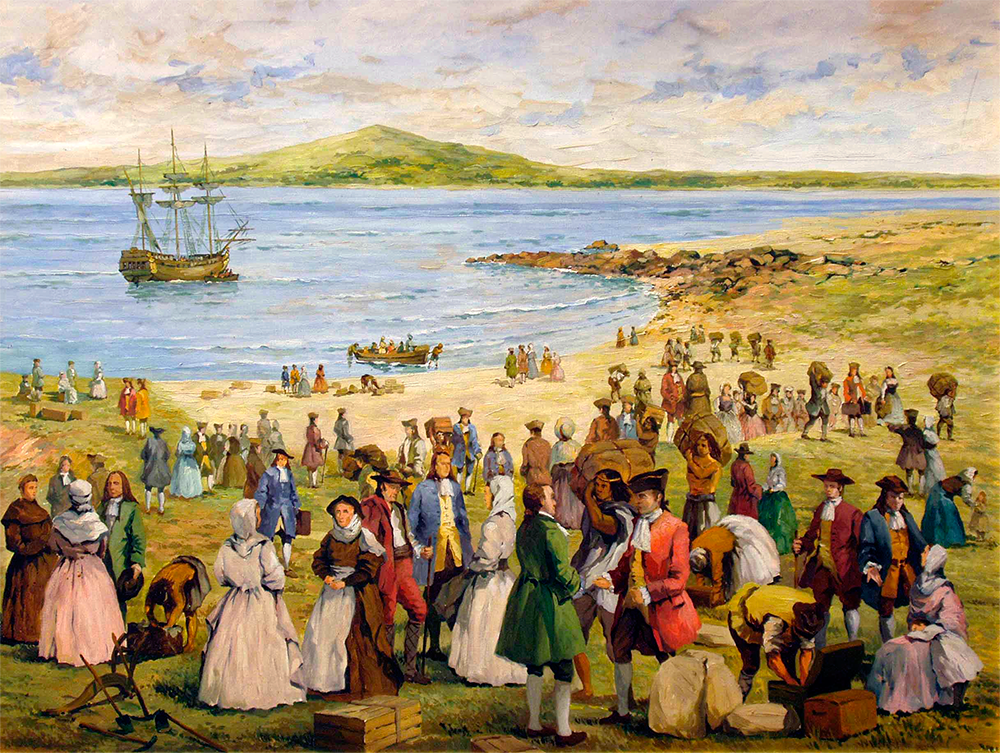
Painting of the first settlers of Montevideo, Canarians who arrived aboard the Nuestra Señora de la Encina frigate in November 1726

The territory of present-day Uruguay was colonized relatively late due to its lack of minerals and other resources of interest to European conquerors. It was not until 1611 that Hernando Arias de Saavedra introduced cattle to the region, which increased its importance and sparked territorial disputes. In 1680, the Portuguese founded Colônia do Santíssimo Sacramento—now known as Colonia del Sacramento. In response, to secure Spanish control over the area, King Philip V of Spain approved the relocation of 25 families from the Canary Islands to the Banda Oriental. These families arrived in December 1726 and participated in the founding of Montevideo.

With the founding of several cities, the arrival of Europeans—mainly Spanish and Portuguese—increased. However, this period also saw the forced migration of African slaves. From the late 18th century, settlers from other parts of Europe, such as Germans, English, and French, began to arrive and engaged in trade. It also included the arrival of conversos fleeing the harshness of the Inquisition. During the colonial period, immigrants from diverse origins and racial groups coexisted, leading to the development of a mixed-race population.

=== Foundational wave (1830–1890) ===
Isla de Flores served as an immigrant inspection and processing station, as well as a lazaretto where new arrivals underwent quarantine.

In July 1830, Uruguay promulgated its first constitution and was formally established as an independent state. At that time, the population of the newly founded country did not exceed 75,000 inhabitants, prompting the government to actively encourage the arrival of immigrants. Between the 1830s and 1940s, primarily Spaniards, Italians, and French nationals settled, many of whom were engaged in agriculture and the saladero industry.

A considerable portion of the new arrivals settled in Montevideo, leading to the establishment of Villa Cosmópolis (now the Villa del Cerro neighborhood) in 1934, with the purpose of accommodating the growing foreign population in the city. It is estimated that by 1841, the French community in Montevideo represented nearly a third of the city’s total population. On the other hand, the borders with the Brazilian Empire were not clearly defined, which led to the settlement of Brazilians in the northern and northeastern regions of the country, including Afro-Brazilians fleeing the slavery policies that were still in place in Brazil.

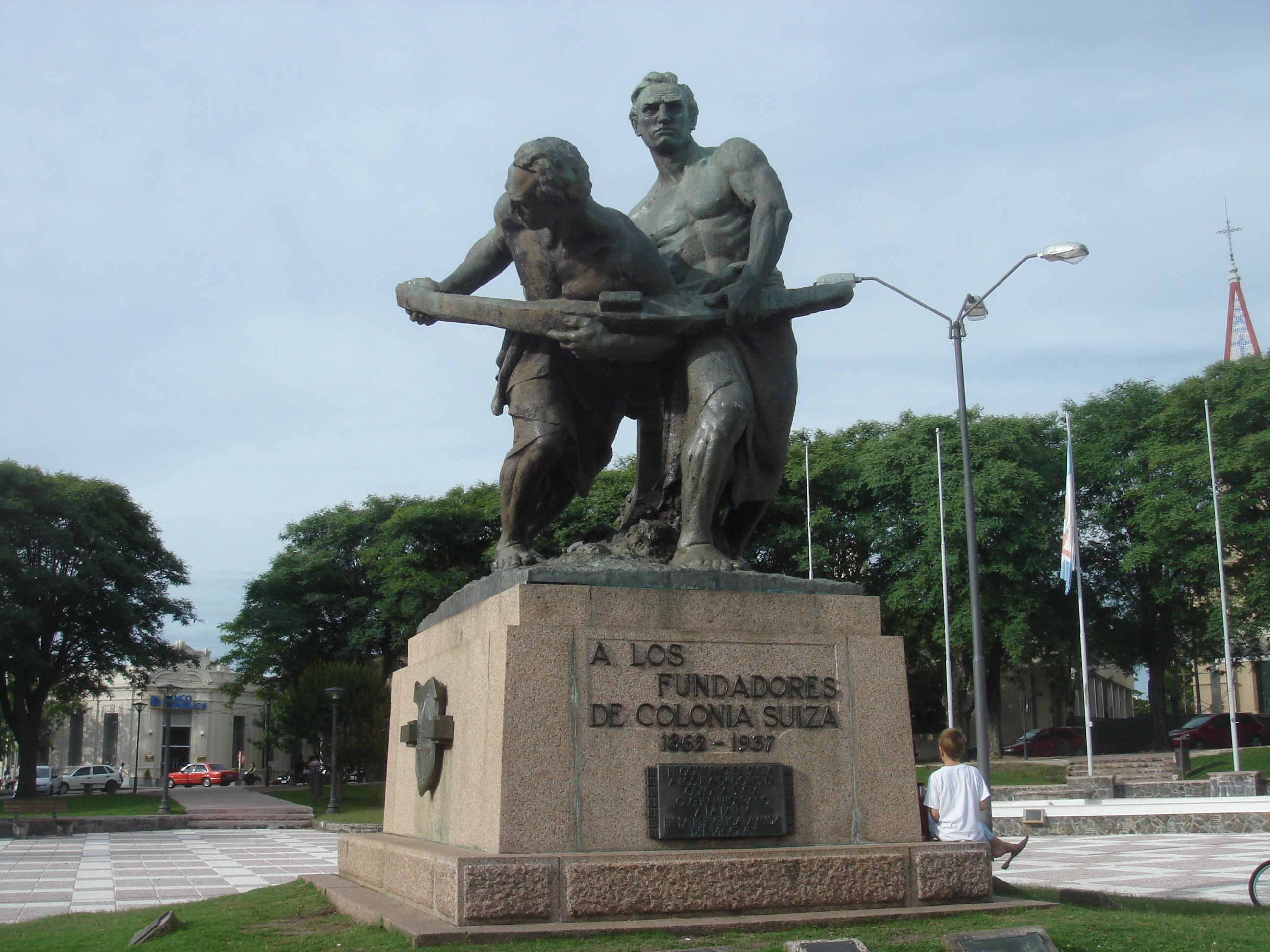
Monuments to the founders of Nueva Helvecia

From 1839 to 1851, the influx of immigrants decreased due to the escalation of the Uruguayan Civil War. However, following the conclusion of the conflict, immigration resumed, and individuals from various European regions began to arrive. The southwestern part of the country, particularly the Colonia Department, became a destination for a significant number of Central Europeans, attracted by its temperate climate, which resembled that of many of their regions of origin, as well as its fertile land suitable for agricultural and livestock practices.

In 1858, Waldensians from Piedmont established Colonia Valdense and La Paz, and in 1862, a group composed primarily of Swiss, along with smaller numbers of Germans, Austrians, and French, founded Nueva Helvecia as an agricultural colony. In these settlements, the inhabitants preserved the traditions and culture of their places of origin, which were reflected in their architecture, economic activities, gastronomy, and festivities. In 1860, 34% of Uruguay's population was foreign-born.

In the second half of the 19th century, immigration increased significantly from several European countries, notably the United Kingdom, where individuals sought work in agriculture and industries controlled by English capital. Additionally, immigrants arrived from Germany and Poland, particularly following the January Uprising, as well as from neighboring Argentina.

The Reforma Vareliana (Spanish for 'Varelian Reform'), which resulted in the passing of the 'Common Education Law' in 1877 during the era of militarism, laid the foundations of the Uruguayan educational system by establishing universal, compulsory, and free education. These features played a crucial role in the integration of migrants from diverse ethnic and religious backgrounds who arrived in the country.

=== European migration era (1890–1960) ===
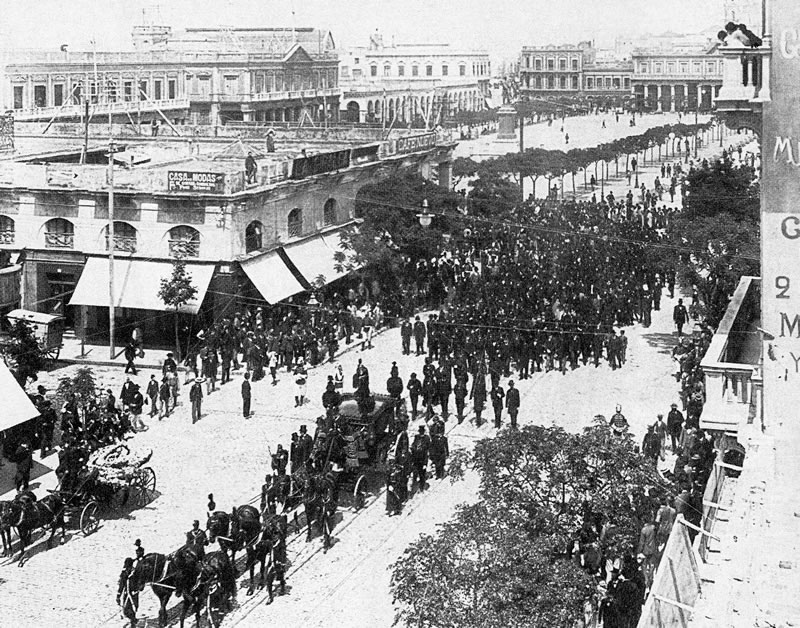
From the 1880s onward, the city of Montevideo witnessed urban growth and an expansion of construction influenced by European architectural styles, particularly Art nouveau.

From the final decades of the 19th century, facilitated by the Uruguayan government's open immigration policies, the influx of Spaniards—mainly Basques and Galicians—Italians, and French remained the most prominent. Concurrently, individuals from other European origins, including the Irish, Croats, Portuguese and Hungarians, began to settle in the country. During the late 1880s, Jewish immigration to Uruguay also took root, initially with small groups of Sephardic Jews arriving from neighboring Brazil and Argentina. This was followed by larger waves of Ashkenazi Jews from Eastern Europe, ultimately contributing to the establishment of a significant Jewish community in Montevideo.

In 1890, the first Migration Law was passed, facilitating the entry of migrants for labor purposes. It provided assistance for accommodation and food and allowed work-related tools to be imported tax-free. However, it also imposed restrictions, notably prohibiting the entry of "Asians, Africans, and individuals referred to as gypsies or bohemians". In response, the Syrian-Lebanese community, which had been established by a significant influx of Maronite Christians from Lebanon, petitioned Parliament to repeal this provision. They sought to enable their fellow countrymen—originally from West Asia—to settle in Uruguay. Consequently, in 1906, a new law amended the previous regulation, specifying that the entry ban would not apply "to Syrians from the region of Lebanon," thereby increasing the migration of Lebanese Christians to Uruguay.

The Montevideo neighborhood of Villa Muñoz attracted immigrants from diverse backgrounds, though it was primarily populated by Ashkenazi Jews, which led to it becoming the Jewish quarter of the city.

According to estimates, between 1860 and 1920, over 600,000 European immigrants settled in Uruguay, predominantly Italians and Spaniards, leaving a lasting impact on the country’s culture and society, given their significant proportion relative to the national population. In 1908, 17% of the Uruguayan population was foreign-born, with Italians making up 34% and Spaniards 30% of the foreign population.

In the early years of the 20th century, driven by the reforms of the Batlle era—including labor and social rights, the separation of church and state, universal male suffrage, the passing of a divorce law, and the creation of a welfare state—Uruguay consolidated its position as a key destination for a significant influx of European immigrants. Among them were increasing numbers of nationals from Eastern European countries, such as Russians, Lithuanians, and Ukrainians, along with Greeks, and a larger influx of Ashkenazi and Sephardic Jews fleeing pogroms, leading to the formation of a Jewish quarter in Montevideo.

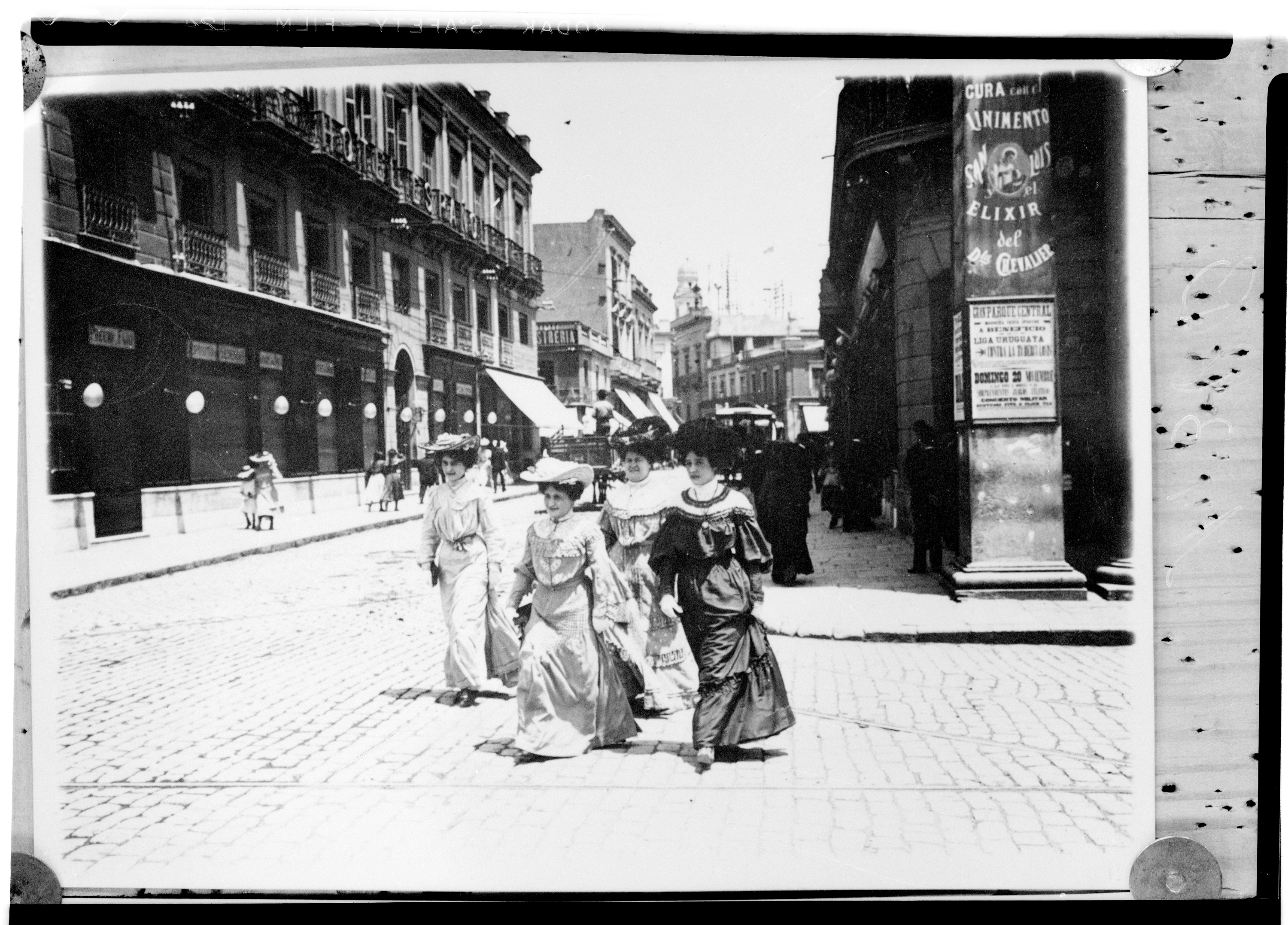
Old City of Montevideo in the 1910s.

In 1913, 300 families of Russian, Ukrainian and Byelorussian origin who emigrated to Uruguay due to the economic hardship and political instability in the Russian Empire founded the town of San Javier, an agricultural community in which they upheld their cultural traditions, language, and customs. Similarly, around fifteen Jewish families from Belarus and Bessarabia established the Jewish agricultural community of 19 de Abril in the Paysandú Department.

After World War I, the arrival of Armenian survivors of the genocide perpetrated by the Ottoman Empire began, and in the following years, the Armenian-Uruguayan community would grow to become one of the most significant in the diaspora. Between 1919 and 1932, approximately 100,000 European immigrants arrived in the country, driven primarily by the devastation of war, territorial reorganizations in Central Europe and the impact of ethnic persecution.

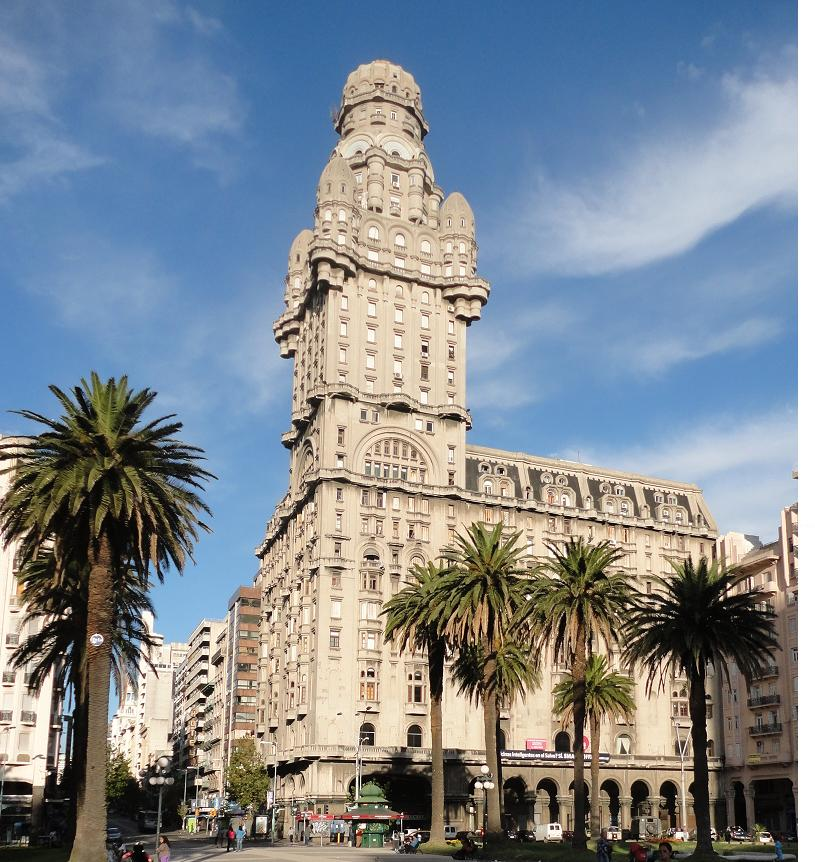
The Palacio Salvo, completed in 1928 in the Art Deco style, was Latin America's tallest building at the time, showcasing the city's growth and modernity.

In the 1920s, Montevideo emerged as a vibrant melting pot of cultures, driven by the massive influx of European immigrants. This cultural diversity was reflected in the city’s daily life, cuisine, and traditions, shaping the city’s cosmopolitan identity. It also began to stand out for its modern architecture, marked by the adoption of the Art Deco and other European architectural styles which graced numerous buildings and shaped the urban landscape.

The Migration Law of 1932—known as the Law of Undesirables—passed during the dictatorship of Gabriel Terra, significantly tightened Uruguay's immigration policy. It established grounds for denying entry and expelling immigrants deemed "unfit" for the country's development. It was implemented in response to the economic hardships caused by the Wall Street crash of 1929, with the aim of protecting Uruguay’s economic stability and limiting the influx of immigrants considered undesirable in light of the crisis.

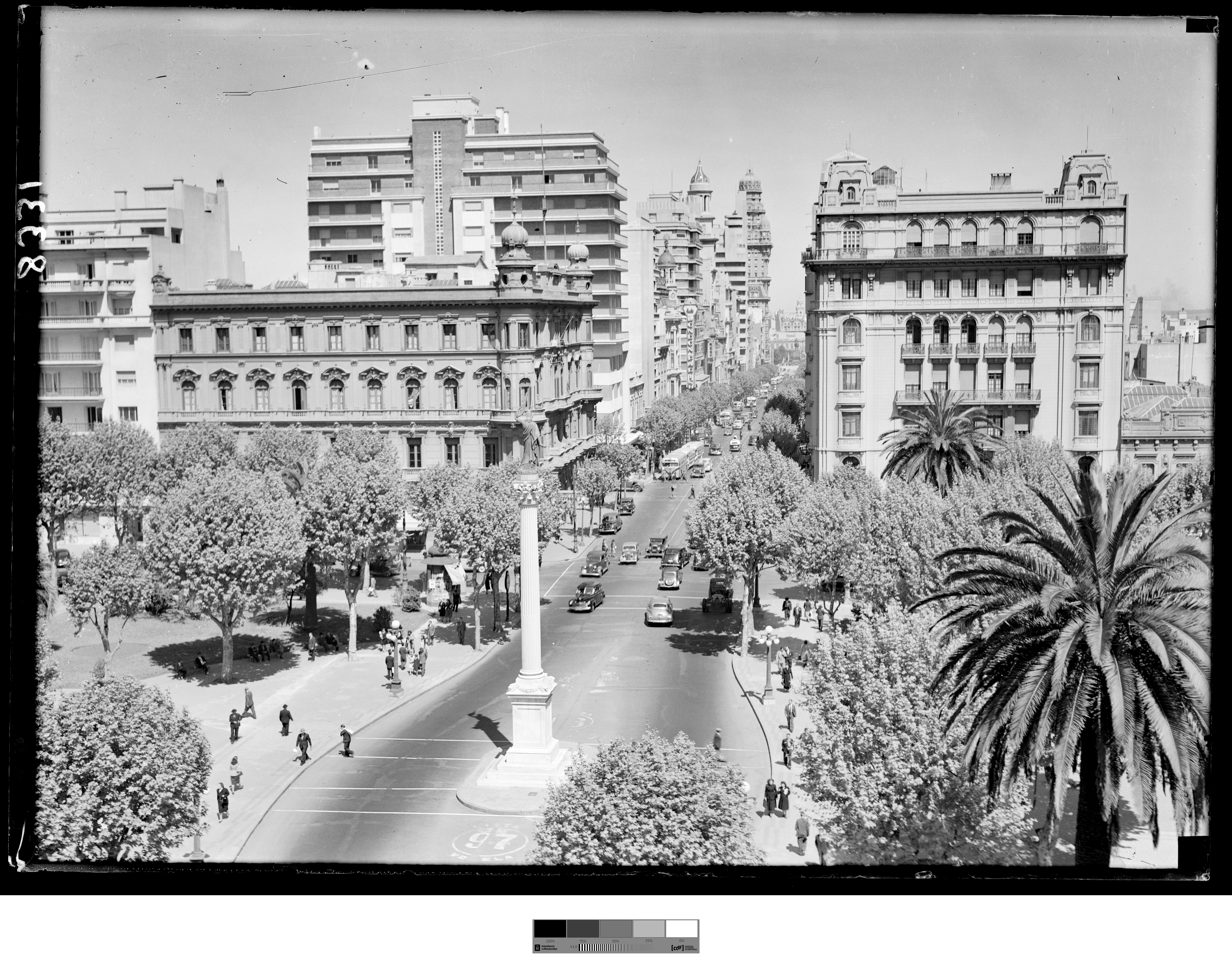
Plaza Cagancha in the 1940s.

Despite the strict immigration policies in Uruguay, the interwar period saw a new wave of migration, including Slovenes, Lithuanians, Croats, and a significant number of Ashkenazi Jews fleeing persecution. These refugees, mostly from Germany, Poland, Austria, and Hungary, sought refuge as a result of the rise of Nazism and the implementation of anti-Semitic policies by several European governments. Beginning in 1936, refugees from the Spanish Civil War started to arrive, and following the rise of Francoist Spain, a significant influx of Spanish Republicans settled in Uruguay. During this period, the establishment of institutions, cultural associations, newspapers, and radio stations by each migrant community became widespread.

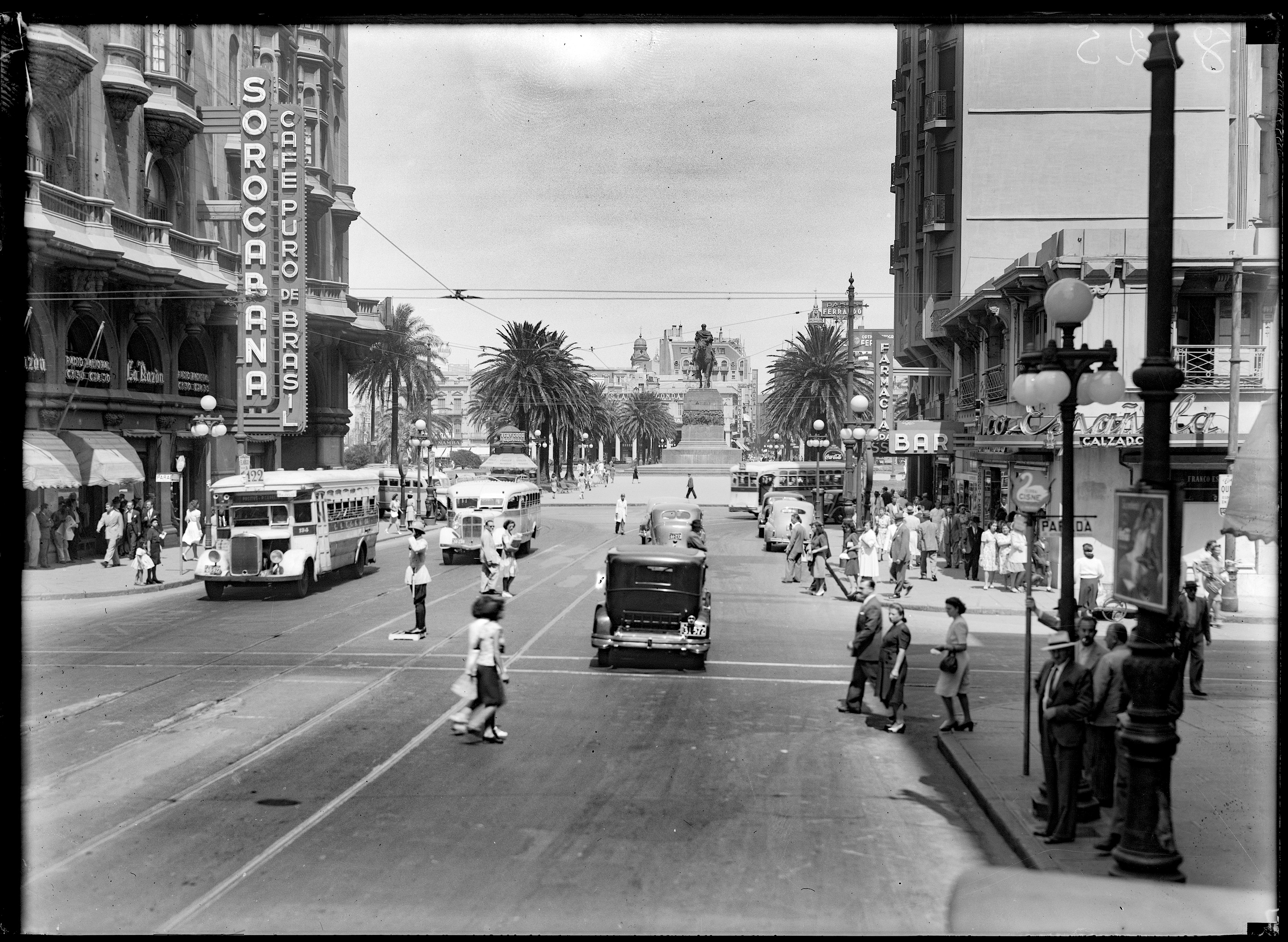
18 de Julio Avenue and Plaza Independencia in 1940

In 1946, approximately 1,570 Jewish survivors of the Holocaust settled in Uruguay. This influx was made possible by a government decision in January 1945, which exempted individuals with relatives already residing in the country from the requirement to prove economic self-sufficiency. Throughout the 1950s, German Mennonite immigrants from West Prussia established several agricultural settlements—El Ombú, Gartental, and Colonia Delta—where they preserved their customs and language, which were incorporated into the educational curriculum.

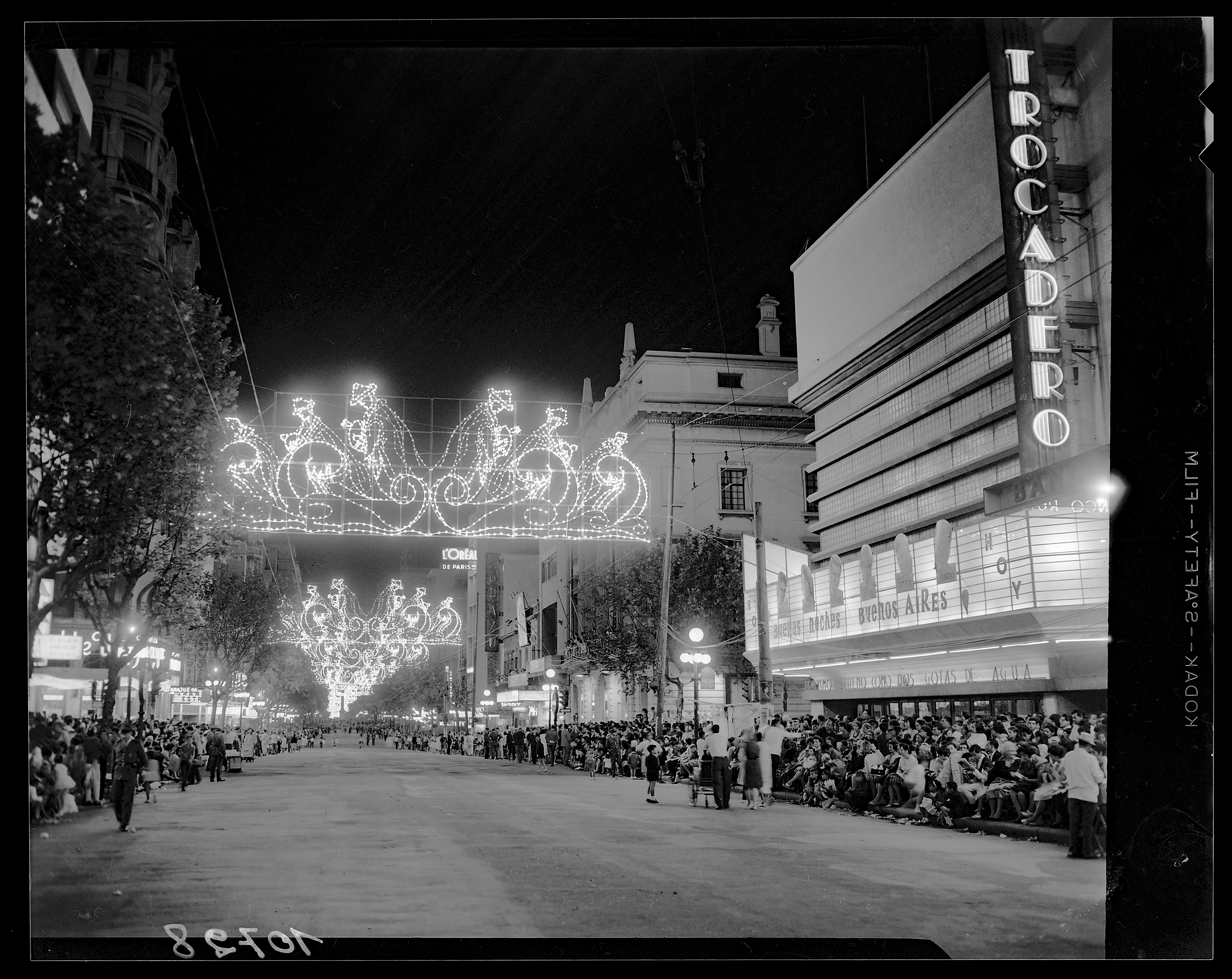
Carnival parade in front of the Trocadero Cinema in Montevideo, 1965

In the 1940s and 1950s, European immigration to Uruguay remained significant, driven by the economic and social prosperity the country experienced during the New Batllism era—a period in which Uruguay was known as the 'Switzerland of the Americas' due to its political stability, high level of development, high quality of life, social welfare state and democratic governance. Italians and Spaniards continued to be the largest groups, with 37,043 Spaniards settling in Uruguay between 1946 and 1958.

=== European migration decline (1960–2010) ===
In the 1960s, as Europe underwent reconstruction and significant improvements following World War II, the flow of European immigrants to Uruguay began to decline. The countries that had previously been the primary sources of migration to Uruguay began experiencing significant improvements in living conditions. In Italy, the economic miracle of the late 1950s and early 1960s contributed to a decline in emigration rates. Simultaneously, Uruguay entered a period of turmoil marked by economic crisis and social unrest, further intensified by the actions of the far-left urban guerrilla group, Tupamaros (MLN–T). This organization engaged in acts of left-wing terrorism, including kidnappings, bombings, assassinations, bank robberies, and the theft of weapons.

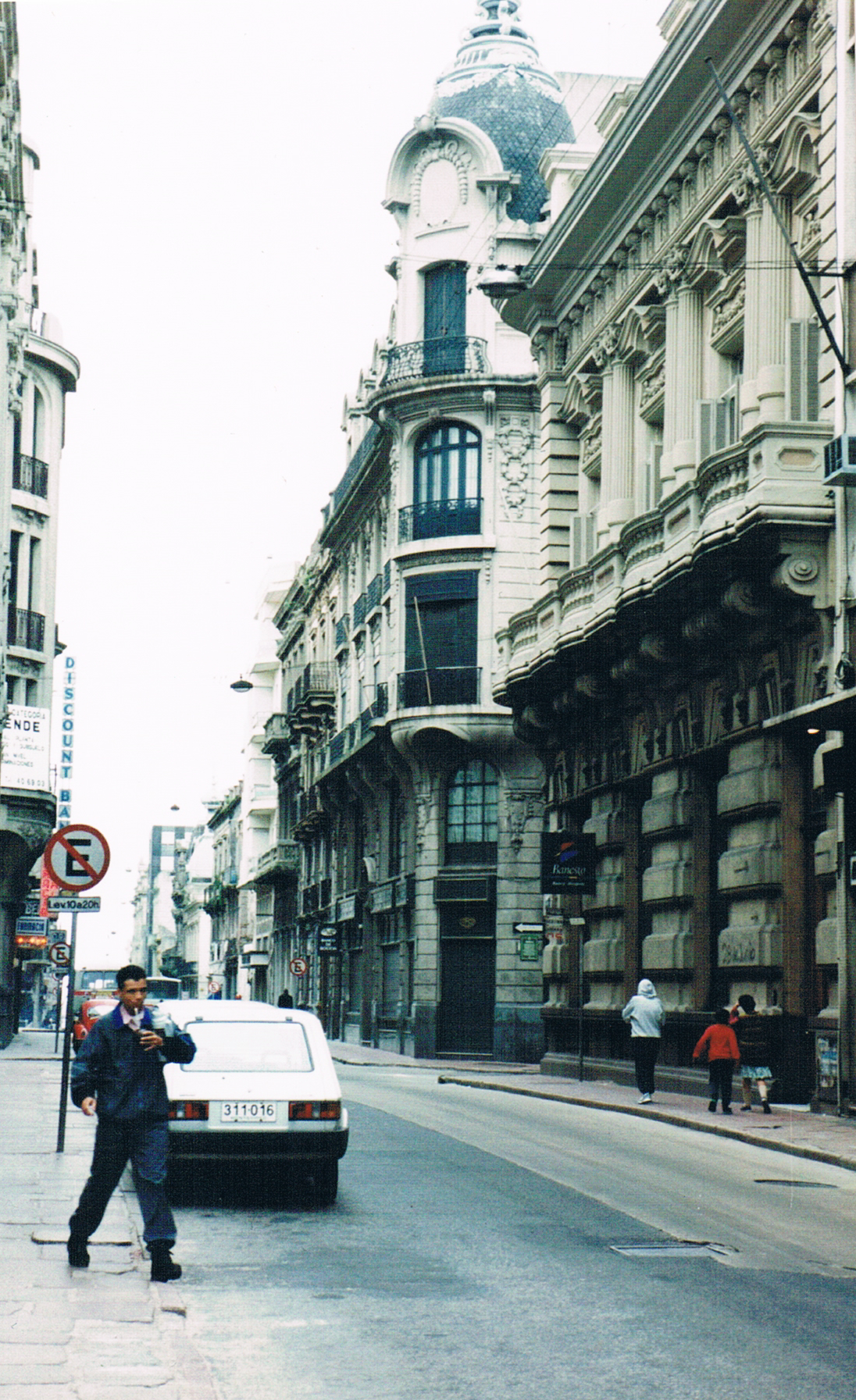
A street in Montevideo, 1999

Due to the growing instability, migration patterns were reversed, leading to the emigration of Uruguayans. The 1973 coup d'état and the subsequent civic-military dictatorship (1973–1985) played a significant role in the formation of a Uruguayan diaspora. In the 1990s, following the transition to democracy, there was a minor influx of immigrants from South American countries, primarily from Paraguay, Bolivia, and Peru.

In 2001 and 2002, in response to the banking crisis affecting Uruguay, a considerable number of Uruguayans emigrated. Many of these individuals leveraged dual nationality acquired through their European ancestry to facilitate their relocation. By the mid-2000s, Uruguay's improving economic and social conditions, together with the deterioration of conditions in several of the countries receiving Uruguayan emigrants—notably Spain, which was affected by the 2008–2014 financial crisis—led a significant number of Uruguayans to return. This return migration also included Spanish immigrants, many of them young people with university-level education.

=== Current migration situation (2011–present) ===
According to the 2011 census, Uruguay was home to 59,327 repatriated citizens and 77,003 immigrants, collectively accounting for approximately 4% to 5% of the population. Among immigrant groups, the Peruvian community experienced the most significant growth during the period from 1996 to 2011.

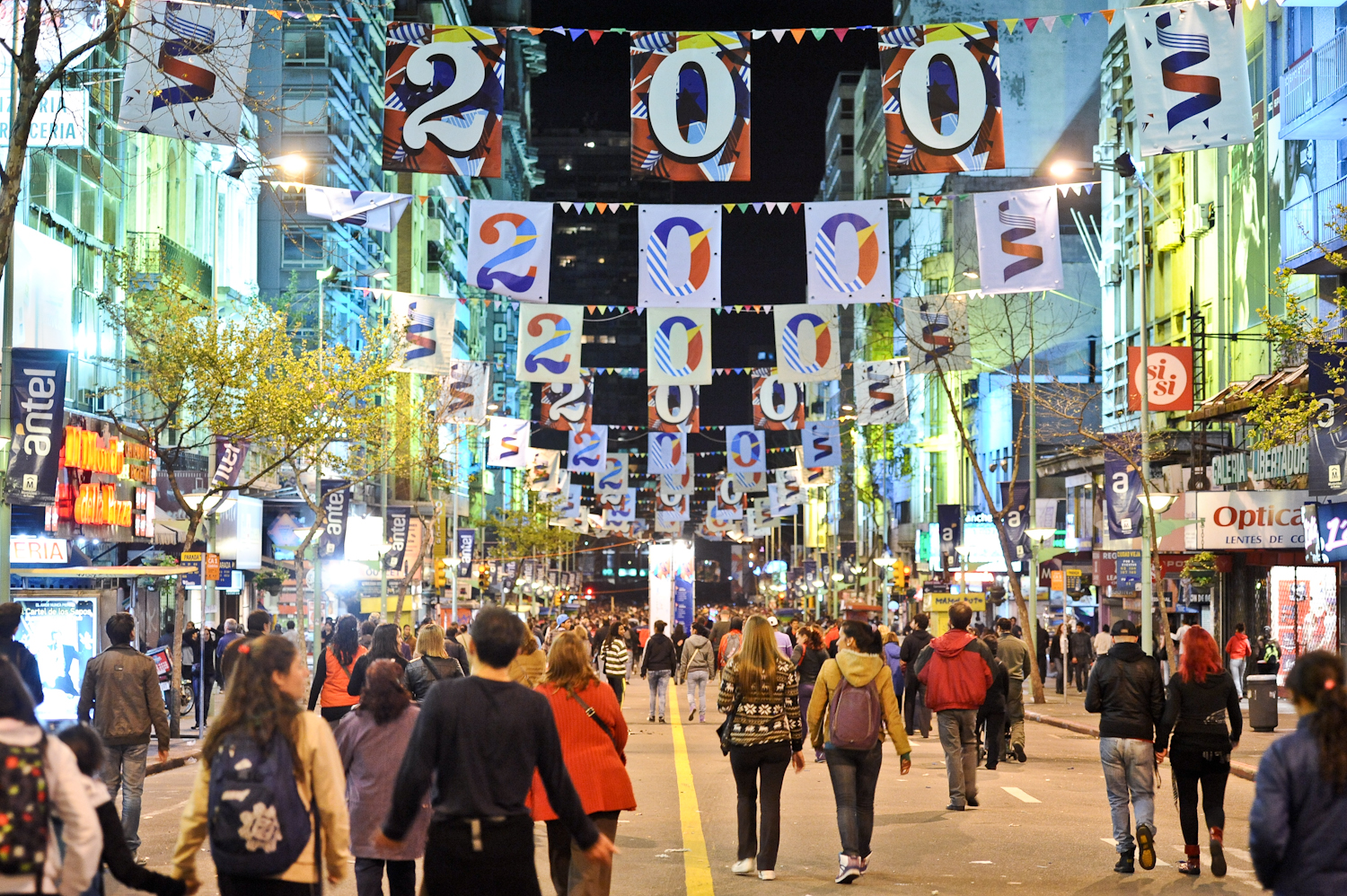
Street decorations for the celebration of the Bicentennial of the Independence Revolution, 2011

Starting in 2014, a significant influx of Venezuelan immigrants began, driven by the political and humanitarian crisis in their home country. The ease of document processing, facilitated by both nations' membership in the Southern Common Market, the shared language, and Uruguay's political and economic stability were among the key factors contributing to this migration. In the following years, there was also an increase in immigration from the Dominican Republic and Cuba, which, together with Venezuelan immigration, accounted for the majority of applicants for permanent residence in Uruguay during the first half of 2018.

From 2020 onward, a new wave of immigration from neighboring Argentina emerged, primarily driven by the economic crisis the country had been enduring since 2018, which was further exacerbated by the COVID-19 pandemic. Between January 2020 and February 2022, approximately 23,000 Argentines applied for permanent residency through the Uruguayan Foreign Ministry. The majority of these immigrants settled in Montevideo and the departments of Canelones and Maldonado.

In 2023, 1.8% of primary school students in Uruguay were foreign-born. A total of 62 different nationalities were represented, with a notable prevalence of students from Argentina, Brazil, Spain, Venezuela, and the United States. According to the 2023 census, 62,000 foreigners settled in Uruguay between 2013 and 2022.

== Main immigration groups ==
Spaniards, Italians, and descendants of African slaves together formed the backbone of modern day Uruguayan culture and society.

Minor immigrant groups that, although are small in number, still play an important role in Uruguayan society, include:

- French: Making up 10% of Uruguay's population (c. 300,000), Frenchmen began immigrating to South America during the 1800s. French Uruguayans are the third largest ancestry group in Uruguay, behind Spaniards and Italians. Ever since French immigrants entered Uruguay, French influence has always been strong in Uruguayan culture.
- Basques (needs information)
- Germans: Uruguay does contain a number of Germans: about 15,000 German expatriates and around 150,000 people of German descent. Uruguay has also adopted some of Germany's culture, and a variety of German institutions.
- Jews: Uruguay has about 12,000–20,000 Jews, and even though it isn't a large number, it's one of the biggest Jewish communities in the world, and one of the biggest religions in Uruguay. The majority of Jews entered during World War I and World War II, the most being Ashkenazi Jews, German Jews, and Italian Jews.
- Lebanese: There are about 53,000–70,000 Lebanese in Uruguay; it is one of the oldest immigrant groups in South America, dating the first wave back around the 1860s.
- Other significant minorities include: Armenians, Austrians, Britons, Bulgarians, Croats, Greeks, Hungarians, Irish, Scots, Syrians, Lithuanians, Poles, Russians, Romani, Slovaks, Slovenes, Swiss, Ukrainians. There are very small Asian communities, mainly from China, Japan and Korea.

There is a very recent inflow of Latin Americans: Peruvians, Bolivians, Paraguayans, Venezuelans. The University of the Republic is free, which means that many Chilean students come to study in Uruguay. Many people from neighboring Argentina and Brazil, who frequently travel to Uruguay to spend their holidays, have chosen it as permanent residence. In a very recent trend, North Americans and Europeans are also choosing to retire in Uruguay. There are over 12,000 foreign workers from 81 countries registered in the Uruguayan social security.

Immigrants tend to integrate into mainstream society, as several scholars have shown.

Based on data from the 2011 census, currently there are about 77,000 immigrants in Uruguay and 27,000 returning Uruguayans.

As of October 2014, Uruguay received a new flow of immigrants from Syria as a consequence of the Syrian Civil War.

With the construction works of UPM pulp mills in Fray Bentos and later near Paso de los Toros, new small waves of immigrants have entered the country, in search of jobs.

In recent years Uruguay has been experiencing the drama of stateless people. The Government has plans to diversify the reasons for obtaining visas to adapt to the new reality.

== Culture ==
Several cultural expressions characterize recent migrants. One of the most notable is gastronomy: ingredients such as mango, papaya, mandioca, yucca, are increasingly found in food shops. Recent migrants such as those from Venezuela serve their arepas, cachapas and empanadas. Cuban immigrants cook congri rice (with black beans), roasted port, yucca with sauce, buñuelos. Further, local sushi has more similarities with the Peruvian sort.

Migrant influencers use social media such as YouTube try help the integration of immigrants.

== See also ==
- Demography of Uruguay
- Emigration from Uruguay
- Spanish Uruguayan
- Italian Uruguayan
- French Uruguayan
- German Uruguayans
- Jews in Uruguay
- Culture of Uruguay
- Afro-Uruguayan
- Immigration to Argentina

== Bibliography ==
- Goebel, Michael. "Gauchos, Gringos and Gallegos: The Assimilation of Italian and Spanish Immigrants in the Making of Modern Uruguay 1880–1930," Past and Present (August 2010) 208(1): 191–229 doi:10.1093/pastj/gtp037
- Bresciano, Juan Andrés. "L'Immigrazione Italiana in Uruguay Nella Piu Recente Storiografia (1990–2005)." ["Italian immigration to Uruguay in the most recent historiography, 1990–2005"] Studi Emigrazione, June 2008, Vol. 45 Issue 170, pp 287–299
