= Peruvian Uruguayans =

Total population
- 1,433 (2011 Uruguayan Census)

Regions with significant populations
- Montevideo

Languages
- Peruvian Spanish and Rioplatense Spanish

Related ethnic groups
- Peruvian Chileans, Peruvian Mexicans, Peruvian Americans, Peruvian Argentines

Peruvian Uruguayans are mostly Peruvian-born persons living in Uruguay. There are as well some Uruguayan-born persons of partially or full Peruvian descent.

== Overview ==
Peruvian immigrants started arriving in Uruguay around 1990, mainly by land. Both countries share the Spanish language; their historical origins are common (part of the Viceroyalty of the River Plate, Spanish Empire). The 2011 Uruguayan census revealed 1,433 people who declared Peru as their country of birth; other sources state that there are some 2,000 to 3,000 Peruvians living and working in Uruguay, mostly in fisheries or as domestic servants.

As of 2013, Peruvians represent one of the most dynamic immigration flows in Uruguay. Yet most of them still live in poverty; only 125 are registered in the Uruguayan social security. Rather than fully assimilating into Uruguayan mainstream society, they tend to represent an example of multiculturalism. Official sources show that over 1,600 Peruvians obtained their Uruguayan identification documents in 2016.

The Uruguayan-Peruvian Cultural Association César Vallejo in Motevideo.

== Notable people ==
- Julián Legaspi, television and film actor, born in Montevideo to a Peruvian mother

== See also ==
- Peru–Uruguay relations
- Peruvian diaspora
- Immigration to Uruguay
