= Bolivia–Uruguay relations =

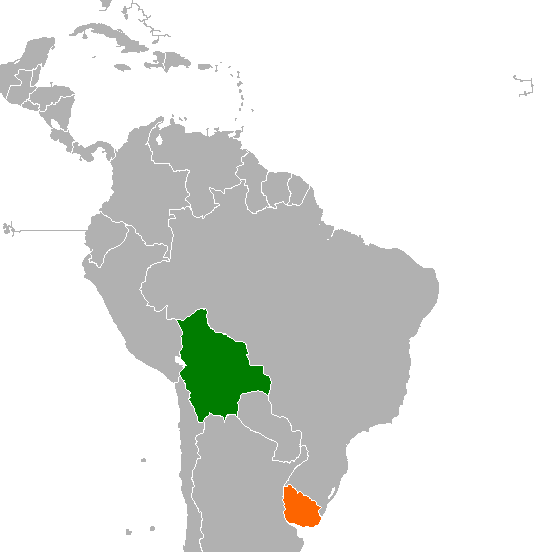
- Bolivia: Uruguay

Bolivia–Uruguay relations refers to the diplomatic relations between the Plurinational State of Bolivia and the Oriental Republic of Uruguay. Both nations are members of the Cairns Group, Community of Latin American and Caribbean States, Group of 77, Latin American Integration Association, Organization of American States, Organization of Ibero-American States and the United Nations.

== History ==
Both Bolivia and Uruguay share a common history in the fact that both nations were once part of the Spanish Empire. During the Spanish colonial period, parts of Bolivia were initially governed by the Viceroyalty of Peru in Lima. In 1776, Bolivia and Uruguay were governed by the Viceroyalty of the Río de la Plata and administered from Buenos Aires. Diplomatic relations between Bolivia and Uruguay were established on 1 November 1843.

Both nations partake in various multilateral South American summits and have had several high-level bilateral meetings. There have been several visits by leaders of both nations, with the more recent visits being by Uruguayan President José Mujica paying a visit to Santa Cruz de la Sierra in June 2014. In February 2015, Bolivian President Evo Morales paid a visit to Montevideo.

== Bilateral agreements ==
Both nations have signed over 120 bilateral agreements throughout their histories with a few being an Agreement for Economic Cooperation (2004); Agreement for the use of Uruguayan ports by Bolivia (2015); and an Agreement in Technical and Scientific Cooperation (2018).

== Resident diplomatic missions ==
- Bolivia has an embassy in Montevideo.
- Uruguay has an embassy in La Paz and a consulate-general in Santa Cruz de la Sierra.

== See also ==
- Bolivians in Uruguay
- Uruguayans in Bolivia
