= List of ambassadors of Uruguay to Peru =

Ambassador of Uruguay to Peru
- Coat of arms of Uruguay
- Ministry of Foreign Affairs

The Uruguayan ambassador in Lima is the official representative of the Government in Montevideo to the Government of Peru.

Both countries established relations in 1849, when Peru sent Consul José María Civils to Montevideo. Both countries have developed stable relations, although it was only in 1922 that the first legal instrument between both nations was successfully signed.

== List of representatives ==
Diplomatic agrément/Diplomatic accreditation	Ambassador	Observations	President	Term end
August 30, 1912	Juan Carlos Blanco Sienra		José Batlle y Ordóñez	
August 30, 1920	Rafael Fosalba		Baltasar Brum	
June 10, 1931	Pedro Erasmo Callorda		Gabriel Terra	
June 25, 1931	Virgilio Sampognaro		Gabriel Terra	February 27, 1934
May 14, 1942	Enrique Buero		Alfredo Baldomir	
July 19, 1944	Enrique Buero		Juan José de Amézaga	
January 22, 1947	Alvaro Vázquez		Juan José de Amézaga	
March 5, 1948	Eugenio Martínez Thedy		Luis Batlle Berres	May 30, 1961
February 27, 1964	Washington Ríos		Daniel Fernández Crespo	
October 6, 1964	Gilberto Pratt de María		Luis Giannattasio	December 31, 1967
February 12, 1970	Bradamante Toyos		Jorge Pacheco Areco	February 21, 1971
February 1, 1972	César Borba		Jorge Pacheco Areco	February 20, 1973
February 20, 1973	Carlos González Demare		Juan María Bordaberry	
January 29, 1974	Juan Pedro Amestoy		Juan María Bordaberry	
July 19, 1977	Víctor González Ibargoyen		Aparicio Méndez	April 25, 1983
March 30, 1983	Domingo Schipani		Gregorio Conrado Álvarez	
May 13, 1983	Elbio Quintana Solari		Gregorio Conrado Álvarez	
October 11, 1984	Lylian Camps		Gregorio Conrado Álvarez	June 25, 1985
July 2, 1985	Alberto Rodríguez Nin		Julio María Sanguinetti	March 1, 1986
April 1, 1986	Hamlet Goncalvez		Julio María Sanguinetti	
August 5, 1986	Jorge Talice		Julio María Sanguinetti	August 9, 1989
December 5, 1989	Miguel Angel Semino		Julio María Sanguinetti	
July 6, 1995	Tabaré Bocalandro Yapeyú	Ambassador and hostage during the Japanese embassy hostage crisis.	Julio María Sanguinetti	June 17, 1997
June 17, 1997	Diego Zorrilla de San Martín		Julio María Sanguinetti	
August 20, 2002	Juan Bautista Oddone		Jorge Batlle	
November 19, 2007	Juan José Arteaga		Tabaré Vázquez	July 21, 2013
October 4, 2016	Carlos Alejandro Barros Oreiro	As ambassador, he denied political asylum to Alan García in 2018.	Tabaré Vázquez	2020
March 22, 2021	Luis Antonio Hierro López		Luis Lacalle Pou	2026

== See also ==
- List of ambassadors of Peru to Uruguay
