= Mirto Davoine =

Uruguayan footballer (1933–1999)

Personal information
- Full name: Mirto Lenín Davoine Genta
- Date of birth: 13 February 1933
- Place of birth: Uruguay
- Date of death: December 1999
- Position: Defender

Senior career*
Years	Team	Apps	(Gls)
- C.A. Peñarol

International career
- Uruguay
- * Club domestic league appearances and goals

Mirto Lenín Davoine Genta (13 February 1933- December 1999) was a Uruguayan football defender who played for Uruguay in the 1954 FIFA World Cup. He also played for C.A. Peñarol. He died in 1999.
