= Cuba–Uruguay relations =

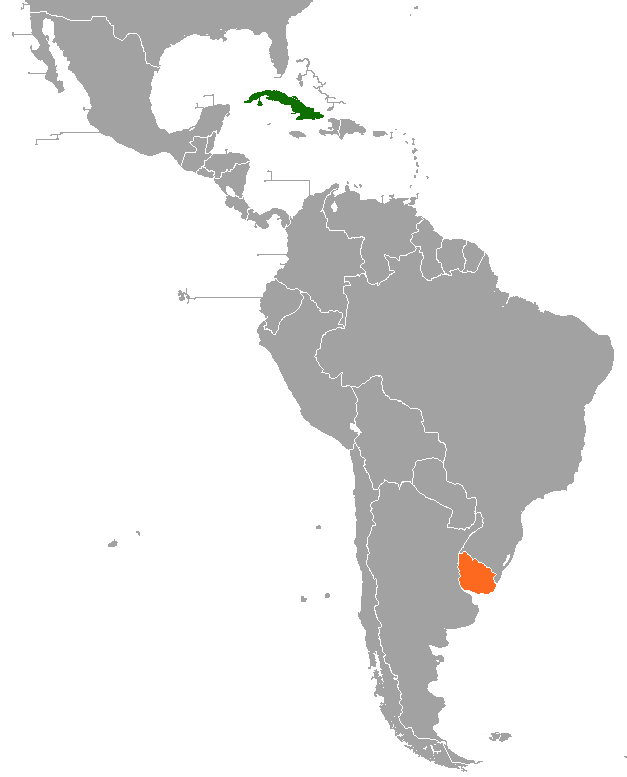

- Cuba: Uruguay

Cuba–Uruguay relations refers to the diplomatic relations between the Republic of Cuba and the Oriental Republic of Uruguay. Both nations are members of the Community of Latin American and Caribbean States, Group of 77, Organization of Ibero-American States and the United Nations.

== History ==
Both Cuba and Uruguay share a common history in the fact that both nations were once part of the Spanish Empire. During the Spanish colonial period, Cuba was governed under the Viceroyalty of New Spain based in Mexico City. Uruguay was governed by the Viceroyalty of the Río de la Plata and administered from Buenos Aires. Diplomatic relations between Cuba and Uruguay were established on 1 September 1902.

In May 1959, Cuban prime minister Fidel Castro paid his first official visit to Uruguay. In September 1964, Uruguay broke diplomatic relations with Cuba following the recommendation of the Assembly of the Organization of American States, held in Punta del Este. In October 1985, diplomatic and commercial ties are resumed during the first term of Uruguayan President Julio María Sanguinetti, after 12 years of military dictatorship. It is the first country to resume relations since the OAS decision.

Both nations partake in various multilateral Latin American summits and have had several high-level bilateral meetings. In October 1995, Cuban President of State Council Fidel Castro paid a second visit to Uruguay. In April 2002, Uruguay broke diplomatic relations with Cuba after the Uruguayan government under President Jorge Batlle led a diplomatic offensive for Cuba to allow the United Nations to investigate alleged human rights abuses on the island. As a response, Cuban President Fidel Castro accused the Uruguayan government of being "outdated and abject Judas" and "lackey of the United States". Diplomatic relations were restored in March 2005.

In June 2008, Uruguayan President Tabaré Vázquez paid an official visit to Cuba and met with President of the State Council Raúl Castro. In July 2013, Uruguayan President José Mujica made a five-day visit to Cuba to commemorate the 60th anniversary of the Attack on the Moncada Barracks, regarded as the beginning of the Cuban Revolution, and met with both Fidel and Raúl Castro. President Raúl Castro attended the second inauguration of Uruguayan President Tabaré Vázquez in March 2015. In September 2021 during the Community of Latin American and Caribbean States summit held in Mexico City, Uruguayan President Luis Lacalle Pou accused the Cuban government of first secretary Miguel Díaz-Canel of not being a democratic nation. In addition, President Lacalle Pou read part of the lyrics of the song Patria y Vida, which became an anthem during the strong protests that broke out in Cuba in July against the Díaz-Canel government.

== Bilateral agreements ==
Both nations have signed several bilateral agreements such as an Administrative Agreement for the Exchange of Tasajo from Uruguay for Sugar from Cuba (1945); Trade Agreement (1986); Agreement for Economic-Industrial and Scientific-Technical Cooperation (1987); Mutual Legal Assistance Treaty in Criminal Matters (1995); Agreement of Cooperation between both nations Ministry's of Foreign Affairs (2006); Agreement of Visa Exemption for Diplomatic, Official and Service Passport holders (2006); Memorandum of Understanding for Trade and Foreign Investment in Cuba (2014); and an Agreement of Cooperation in Physical Culture and Sports (2018).

== Resident diplomatic missions ==
- Cuba has an embassy in Montevideo.
- Uruguay has an embassy in Havana.

== See also ==
- Cubans in Uruguay
