= Jaurés Lamarque Pons =

Uruguayan composer (1917–1982)

Jaurés Lamarque Pons (Salto, 6 May 1917 - Montevideo, 11 June 1982) was an Uruguayan composer and pianist. He composed, often milongas and film music, while performing. From 1940 he was pianist at the Café Tabarís in the orquesta típica of Luis Caruso. Among works known outside Latin America his concerto for classical guitar was recorded for Decca by fellow Uruguayan Eduardo Fernández.
