= Irish Uruguayans =

Irish Uruguayans Gaeilge i Uragua Hiberno-uruguayos
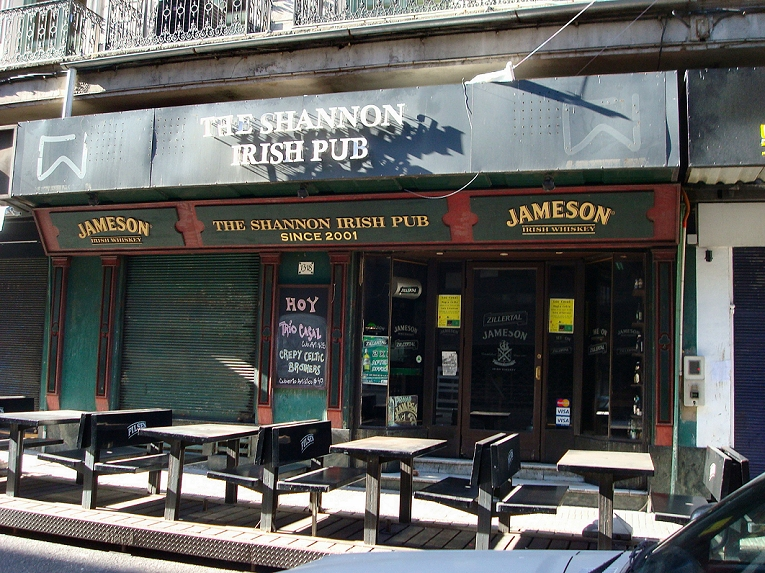
- The Shannon Irish Pub located in Montevideo

Total population
- 150.000 (4% Uruguay’s population)

Regions with significant populations
- Montevideo

Languages
- Predominantly Spanish, with minority speaking either Irish or English

Religion
- Roman Catholicism

Related ethnic groups
- Irish, British Uruguayans, Scottish Argentine, English Argentine, Welsh Argentine, Irish American, Irish Brazilian, Irish Chilean, Irish Mexican

Irish Uruguayans are Uruguayan people with Irish ancestry.

== History ==
Many Irish people migrated to Uruguay starting in the 1700s, and especially during the 19th century, arriving in neighboring Argentina as well.

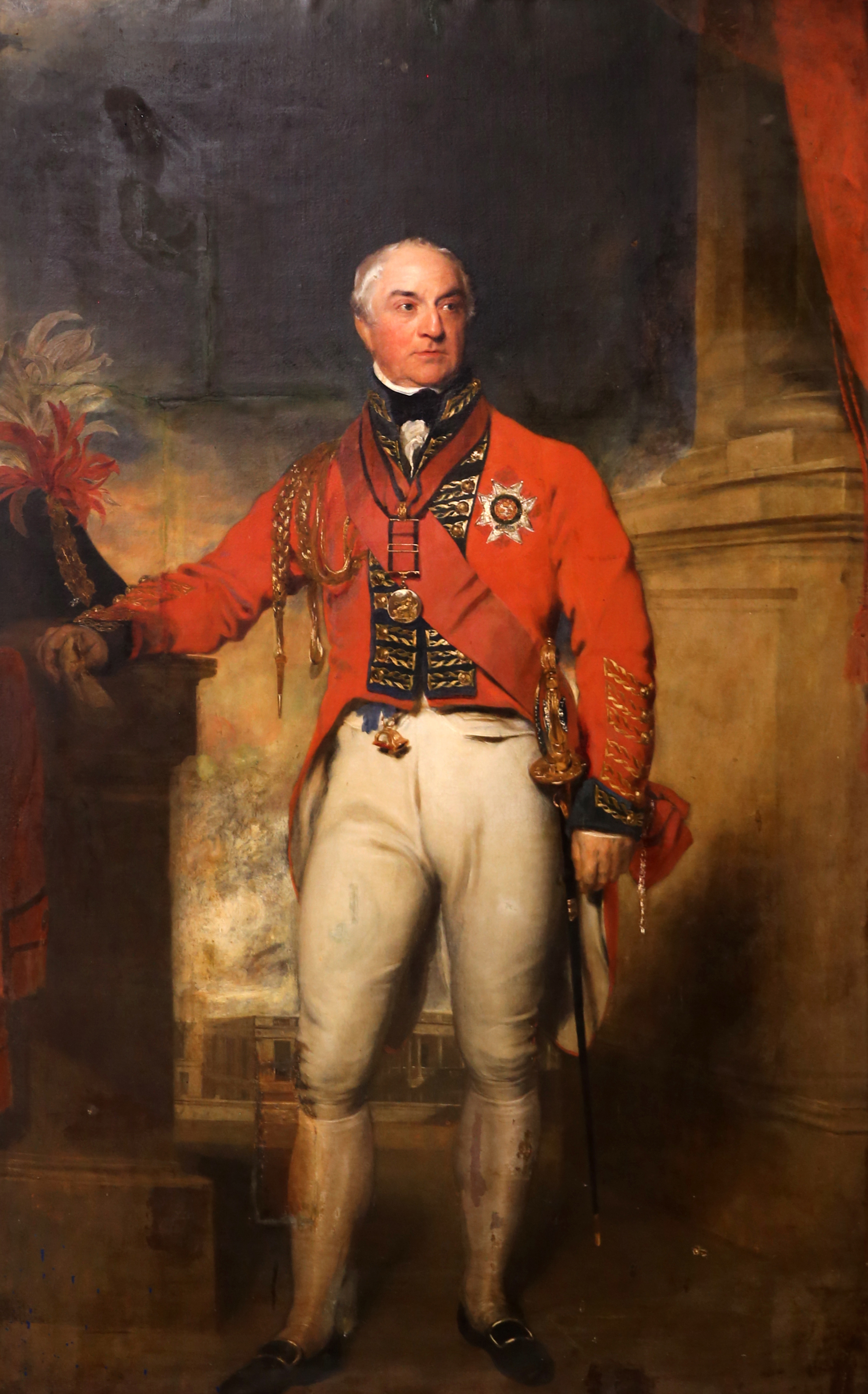
Brigadier-General Sir Samuel Auchmuty

In 1762, Irish captain John McNamara led a British force to occupy Colonia del Sacramento, previously a Portuguese or Spanish stronghold. It failed, but in February 1807, Brigadier-General Sir Samuel Auchmuty occupied Montevideo with a British and Irish force and ruled in the city for seven months, during which a mass of merchants from Britain and Ireland arrived in the city and would contribute to its emerging cultural identity. Irish soldier Peter Campbell (1780-c1832) of the 71st regiment remained on the River Plate and later founded the Uruguayan navy, becoming deputy governor of Corrientes province.

At the peak of its "economic miracle", thousands of Irish immigrants came to live in Uruguay, many of them being professionals or middle managers who formed the bourgeoisie in Montevideo. Many however, were Irish farmers who settled in rural areas. Also during the early days of Uruguay, the Irish settlers helped with the farming of the country as the current conditions at the time could not be met by the native Uruguayans. Cows and local livestock were not as healthy nor as abundant as they are now, whereas the country now has more cows and livestock per capita than people. A significant number of Irish farmers reached the Port of Montevideo by ship in 1836, which led to a boom in sheep-farming and wool production. Sheep farmers from Kilrane parish in County Wexford were known to have moved into Rio Negro district, and Paysandú in the same district was settled by immigrants from Westmeath and Longford. Immigration by the Irish into Uruguay continued in the 1840s as the country, struck hard by the Great Famine, caused masses of people to emigrate all across the world. Juan Manuel de Rosas, the dictator of Argentina at the time was favorable to British settlement, which led to many Irish farmers moving across into Argentina; prominent landowners such as James Gaynor (1802–1892) and John Maguire (d. 1905) operated land in both Uruguay and Argentina. One Irish rancher, William Lawlor (1822–1909), originally from Abbeyleix in County Laois was documented as owning land and a ranch named "Las Tres Patas". Harper's magazine, commenting in 1891, evaluated the typical dwelling of the Irish farmer immigrant, "The cabins of the Irish peasantry give some idea of the Uruguayan rancho. It is a comfortless, unhealthy, rheumatic dwelling, less civilized than that of the Esquimaux, and more carelessly built than the most ordinary bird's nest." There are many blue-eyed Uruguayans with Irish or English ancestry.

Several prominent Irish settlers in Montevideo made a name for themselves in the 19th century; of note in particular are the physician Constantine Conyngham (1807–1868), who rendered important services during the epidemic of 1856 in Montevideo, Louis Fleury, a Dublin-born surgeon-general to the army in Charity Hospital and foreman Robert Young who founded Young city in Rio Negro district, owning some 100,000 sheep and horned cattle by 1875.

By the 20th century, there were a significant number of Irish Christian missionaries and educators in Uruguay, some of which taught in the British School, the Irish Christian Brothers School and the Stella Maris School (established by Br. Patrick C. Kelly in May 1955) in Montevideo. Alfie Lamb established the Legion of Mary in Montevideo in 1956 and many other Latin American countries.

== Culture ==
On St. Patrick's Day there is a notable community celebrating Irish culture and the national day within the capital of Montevideo. The life of Irish sheep-farmers in rural Uruguay in the nineteenth century is covered in In the Shadow of the Ombú Tree, a 2005 novel by Hugh Fitzgerald Ryan.

The Irish have contributed to the cuisine of Montevideo. The Shannon Irish pub is an Irish pub in the Old City area of Montevideo, Uruguay. The pub was established in 2001. It is located at Bartolomé Mitre 1318, 2 blocks from the Plaza Independencia and 1 block from the Plaza Matriz. Bradt Travel Guides says "An Irish pub on Montevideo's liveliest pub street, with a wide range of beers (although Uruguayans find it hard to understand why an Irish pub doesn't serve Irish coffee)." The pub is an important centre for Irish-Uruguayans, often featuring traditional bands such as Grianan (formed in 1999) led by Conrad O'Neill, a fourth-generation Irish-Uruguayan and audiences of some 400 Irish-Uruguayans. Other notable Celtic bands which regularly perform at the pub include Creepy Celtic Brothers, El Enclave, Los Casal, Os Trappaleiros and the River Pipe Band. The bar often features live music and DJs into the night on the weekends and also attracts Uruguayans who are not of Irish descent.

== Notable people ==
- Guillermo Brown Blanco (1838-1882) marine who was the grandson of admiral William Brown, born in Foxford.
  - his nephew, Alfredo Jones Brown (1876-1950) architect.
- Luis Batlle Berres (1897-1964) former President of Uruguay. His mother, Petrona Bayrres Mac Entyre, was of Irish descent.
- Washington Beltrán Mullin (1914-2003) former President of Uruguay. His mother, Elena Mullin Moenckeberg, was of Irish descent.
- Peter Campbell (1782-1832) marine, born in County Tipperary, founder of the Uruguayan Navy.
- Zoilo Canavery (1893-1966) footballer. His father was of Irish descent.
- Diego Forlán (b.1979) former footballer and current manager of Peñarol, who claims to be of Irish descent.
- Edmundo Rey Kelly (1915-1983) actor who went by his stage name, Raimundo Soto.
- Francisco Lecocq (1790-1882) entrepreneur and politician
- Andrés Ojeda (b.1984) lawyer and politician. His paternal great-great-grandfather was an Irish national.
- Fabián O'Neill (1976-2022) footballer. His ancestor Michael O'Neill settled in Uruguay in 1837 from County Cork.
- Jairo O'Neil (2001-), footballer.
- Juan Carlos Onetti (1909-1994) novelist. Of Irish/Scottish descent from his ancestors, his original surname is O'Netty.
- David Stirling (1981-) polo player.

== See also ==
- Irish diaspora
- Immigration to Uruguay
- British Uruguayans
