= SNCF Class BB 22200 =

Class of 205 French electric locomotives

SNCF Class BB 22200 British Rail Class 22
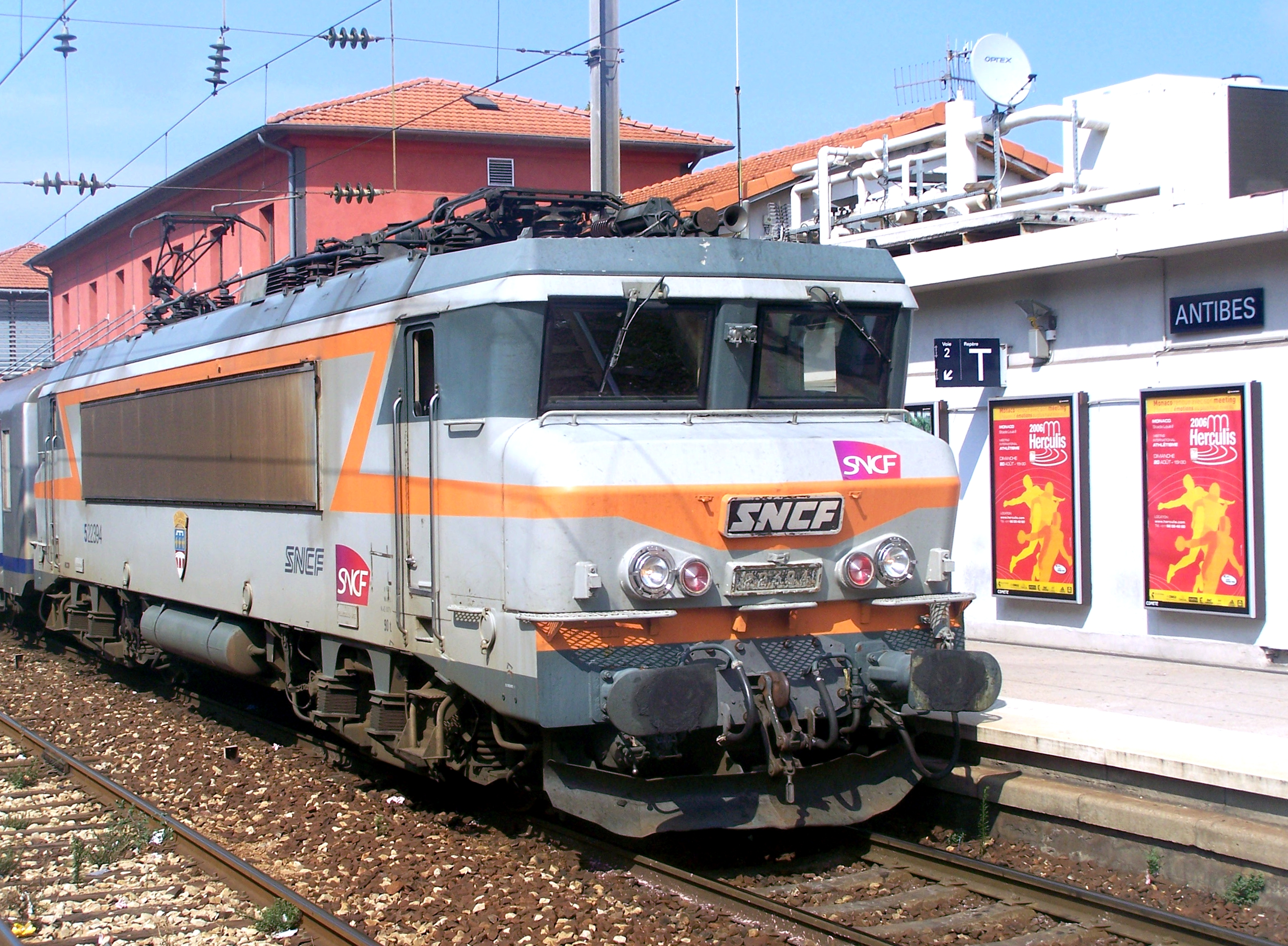
- 22394 at Antibes station (2006)
Type and origin
- Power type: Electric
- Builder: Alstom
- Build date: 1976–1986
- Total produced: 205
Specifications
- Configuration
  - AAR: B-B
  - UIC: B′B′
- Gauge: 1,435 mm (4 ft 8 1/2 in)
- Length: 17.48 m (57 ft 4 in)
- Loco weight: 90 tonnes (89 long tons; 99 short tons)
- Electric system/s: Catenary; 25 kV 50 Hz AC; 1500 V DC
- Current pickups: Pantograph, 2 off
- Traction motors: Alstom TAB674, 2 off
- Loco brake: Air
- Train brakes: Air
Performance figures
- Maximum speed: 160 or 200 km/h (99 or 124 mph)
- Power output: 4,360 or 5,600 kW (5,850 or 7,510 hp)
- Tractive effort: 294 kN (66,000 lbf) (Max)
Career
- Operators: SNCF
- Numbers: BB 22201 – BB 22405; 22379, 22380, 22399 – 22405 (TOPS Numbers)
- Nicknames: Nez Cassés ("broken noses")
- Disposition: 5 withdrawn, remainder in service

The BB 22200 is a class of electric locomotives in service with the French railways SNCF, built by Alstom between 1976 and 1986. They are a dual voltage version (1500 V DC and 25 kV 50 Hz AC) of the BB 7200 and BB 15000 Nez Cassé classes. (Note: The designation "22200" is, in fact, the sum of 7200 and 15000)

== History, operations and design ==
After the first test held in 1976, the BB 22200 were introduced on the Marseille–Nice–Ventimiglia line in southern France–northern Italy. The following year they started to haul longer distance trains such as the Train Bleu (1000 km from Ventimiglia to Paris) and the car-transport train between Marseille and Paris.

The BB 22200 are capable of a maximum speed of 160 kilometres per hour (99 mph). Eight locomotives, having a maximum power of 5,600 kilowatts (7,500 hp), were equipped for services up to 200 kilometres per hour (120 mph) and can work on LGV lines.

From 1994 nine of the class were used for hauling freight trains through the Channel Tunnel as the Class 92 locomotives were not yet delivered. These were numbered 22379/380/399-405, and were used until 1995. For use on British railways these locomotives were allocated the UK TOPS Class 22.

The surviving members of the class are used on services between Bercy–Nevers and Marseille–Bordeaux, as well as on TER services between Lyon, Chambéry and Modane.

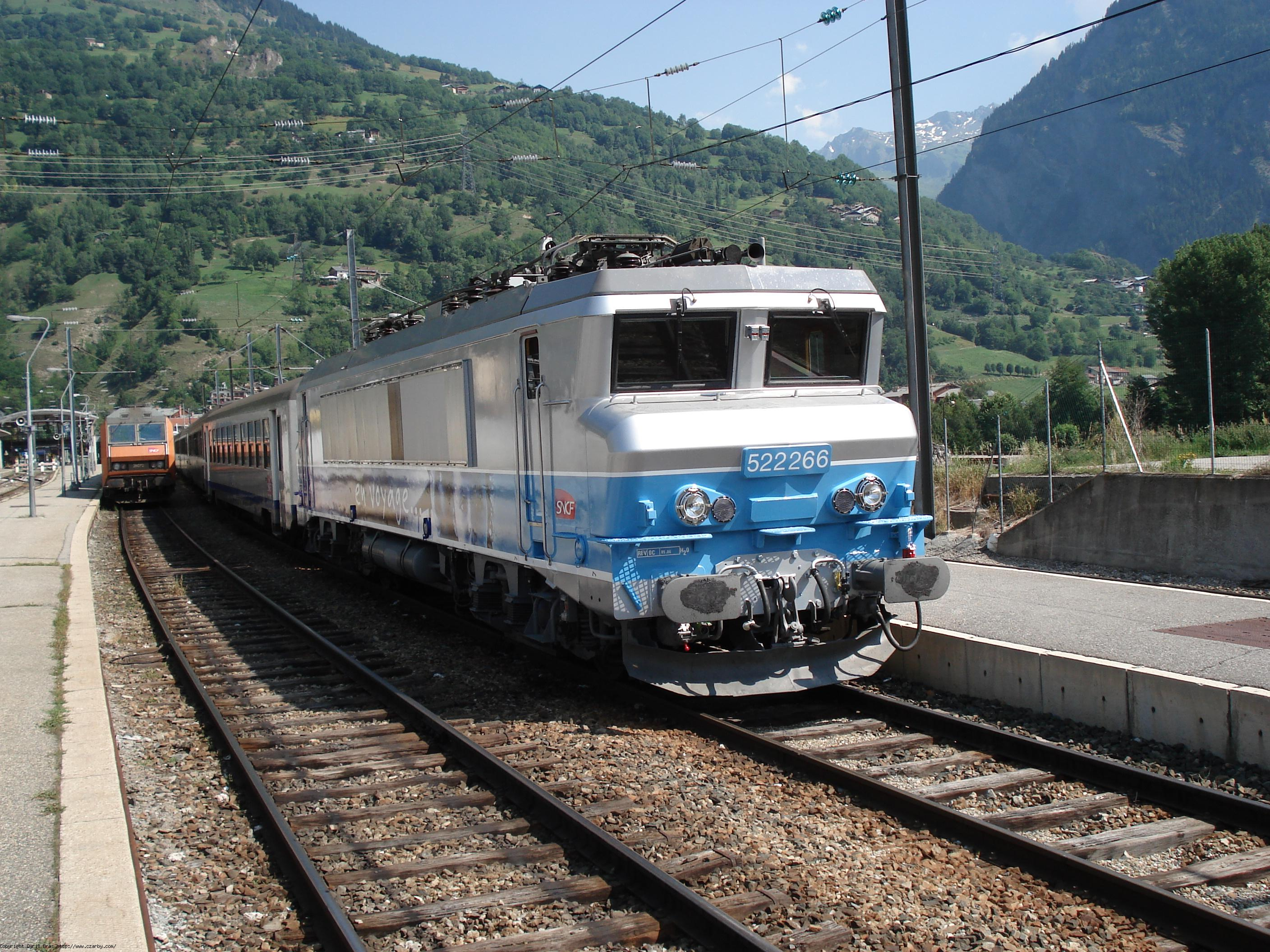
522266 in En Voyage livery

== Names ==
60 members of the class received names, chiefly of French communes, towns and cities.

Number	Name	Number	Name
BB 22202	Oyonnax	BB 22318	Carpentras
BB 22218	Fourmies	BB 22319	Sorgues-sur-Ouvèze
BB 22219	Albertville	BB 22320	Istres
BB 22235	Auberge	BB 22321	Belleville-sur-Saône
BB 22239	Lons-le-Saunier	BB 22322	Bollène
BB 22242	Mulhouse	BB 22323	Cagnes-sur-Mer
BB 22276	Dijon	BB 22324	Lannion
BB 22277	Is-sur-Tille	BB 22325	Champigny-sur-Marne
BB 22280	Hazebrouck	BB 22329	Quimper
BB 22284	Gevry-Chambéry	BB 22346	Aubagne
BB 22285	Chantilly	BB 22351	Valognes
BB 22286	Béthune	BB 22352	Sablé-sur-Sarthe
BB 22287	Saint-Jean-de-Maurienne	BB 22353	Plaisir
BB 22288	Louhans	BB 22354	Ancenis
BB 22291	La Ferté-Alais	BB 22356	Lorient
BB 22300	Chalon-sur-Saône	BB 22366	Malakoff
BB 22301	Villeneuve-d'Ascq	BB 22371	Ladoix-Serrigny
BB 22302	Rive-de-Gier	BB 22372	Mauriac
BB 22303	Croix	BB 22373	Aulnay-sous-Bois
BB 22304	Langeac	BB 22374	Noyon
BB 22305	Saint-Rambert-d'Albon	BB 22375	Méricourt
BB 22307	Le Teil	BB 22375	Douai
BB 22308	Gisors	BB 22377	Roubaix
BB 22311	Pierrefitte (Note: There are a number of French communes and départements of this name. Source does not specify which one it was named after. For a list see Pierrefitte (disambiguation))	BB 22378	Le Quesnoy
BB 22312	Antibes Juan-les-Pins	BB 22381	Le Bourget
BB 22313	Digne-les-Bains	BB 22382	Clermont de l'Oise
BB 22314	Tain-l'Hermitage	BB 22383	Bully-les-Mines
BB 22315	Miramas	BB 22384	Saint-André-lez-Lille
BB 22316	Lomme	BB 22385	Longeau
BB 22317	La Tour-du-Pin	BB 22392	Charles Tellier

== See also ==
- SNCF BB 20011 and 20012 two locomotives of the class used as test locomotives for synchronous electric motors and other technology used in the SNCF Class BB 26000
