= Fabián O'Neill =

Uruguayan footballer (1973–2022)

Personal information
- Full name: Fabián Alberto O'Neill Domínguez
- Date of birth: 14 October 1973
- Place of birth: Paso de los Toros, Uruguay
- Date of death: 25 December 2022 (aged 49)
- Place of death: Montevideo, Uruguay
- Height: 1.86 m (6 ft 1 in)
- Position: Attacking midfielder

Senior career*
Years	Team	Apps	(Gls)
1992–1995	Nacional	63	(15)
1996–2000	Cagliari	120	(12)
2000–2001	Juventus	14	(0)
2002	Perugia	9	(1)
2002	Cagliari	0	(0)
2003	Nacional	5	(0)
Total		211	(28)

International career
1993–2002	Uruguay	19	(2)
- * Club domestic league appearances and goals

Fabián Alberto O'Neill Domínguez (14 October 1973 – 25 December 2022) was a Uruguayan professional footballer who played as a midfielder.

He began and finished his career at Nacional, where he won the Uruguayan Primera División in his debut season in 1992. He spent most of his career in Italy, mainly with Cagliari and also with Juventus and Perugia. He earned 19 caps for Uruguay, starting at the 1993 Copa América and ending at the 2002 FIFA World Cup.

Nicknamed "El Mago" ('The Wizard'), O'Neill was described by Zinedine Zidane as the most talented teammate of his career. He lost his fortune to gambling, and suffered from alcoholism during and after his career, retiring at 29 and died 20 years later.

== Early life ==
O'Neill was the oldest of five children born to Luis Alberto O'Neill and Mercedes Domínguez. He was the great-great-grandson of Michael O'Neill, an Irishman from County Cork who arrived in Uruguay in 1837.

Abandoned by his parents, O'Neill was raised by his grandmother, with whom he had to share a bed until the age of 14. He began working at age nine, selling sausages outside a brothel, and was already drinking at that age.

== Club career ==
O'Neill began his professional career at Nacional in the Uruguayan Primera División, playing in the first team between 1992 and 1995. In his debut season, at the age of 18, his team won the league.

In 1996, O'Neill moved to Italy to play with Serie A club Cagliari, one of several Uruguayans to join the club through agent Paco Casal. The club were relegated to Serie B in 1997, but promoted again in 1998. In 1999, during a game against Salernitana, he performed three nutmegs against the future World Cup winner, Gennaro Gattuso.

After Cagliari were relegated again in 2000, O'Neill was transferred to Juventus for a fee of 20 billion lire (€10 million). He was signed as back-up to Zinedine Zidane, but did not become a regular starter after Zidane left for Real Madrid in 2001. Zidane himself described O'Neill as the most talented teammate of his career.

In January 2002, O'Neill moved to Perugia as part of a deal involving the transfer of Davide Baiocco to Juventus, along with an estimated £3.5 million. He left a team in the UEFA Champions League for one in mid-table, and manager Serse Cosmi praised him for bringing experience to the midfield.

O'Neill terminated his contract at the end of the season to return to Cagliari, now in Serie B, although he did not take to the field during his brief stay. In 2012, O'Neill admitted to twice having fixed Serie A games in order to win bets.

In January 2003, O'Neill returned to Nacional but played only five times. He retired later that year at the age of 29, due to the effects of alcoholism, and returned to his cattle ranch. He later played and managed semiprofessional football in the Uruguayan lower leagues.

== International career ==
O'Neill played 19 times for Uruguay. He played his first match for the national team on 16 June 1993 in a Copa América group match won 1–0 against the United States. He came on as a substitute for Adrián Paz with seven minutes remaining, but took no further part in the tournament due to injury.

As he played fewer games following his transfer to Juventus in 2000, O'Neill was dropped by Uruguay during 2002 FIFA World Cup qualification. On 28 March 2001, he gave a poor performance as a substitute in a 1–0 home loss against Paraguay on Víctor Púa's debut as manager, and took no part in the rest of the qualification campaign.

After O'Neill's move to Perugia in January 2002, he was reintroduced to the team, playing in central midfield. He scored on his comeback, a 3–2 friendly loss to Saudi Arabia on 27 March; his performance in a 1–1 draw with Italy at the San Siro on 17 April was praised by pundit Tim Vickery.

Púa called O'Neill up for the 2002 FIFA World Cup in Japan and South Korea. The last of his 19 caps was on 16 May 2002 in a 2–0 friendly win against China in Shenyang. He played no games at the World Cup due to an Achilles tendon injury, and Vickery considered his absence a reason why Uruguay were eliminated in the group stages, having prepared their attack around him.

== Personal life and death ==
O'Neill had two daughters and a son, each of whom was born to a different mother. As of December 2021, his son Favio was playing as a defensive midfielder for the under-19 team of Peñarol, Nacional's rivals; as of June 2020, his middle child Martina was a field hockey player. His cousin Jairo (born 2001) also played for Peñarol.

In 2013, O'Neill wrote an autobiography, Hasta la última gota (Until the Last Drop). He had a gallbladder operation in June 2016 and was told to abstain from alcohol for three years, but began drinking a month later.

In February 2017, O'Neill said that he lost his fortune of US$14 million on "slow horses, fast women and gambling", but that he did not regret becoming poor. In his autobiography, he said that he once spent US$250,000 on 1,104 cows, having attended a cattle auction while drunk.

O'Neill was hospitalised in June 2020 with cirrhosis. He was advised that if he abstained from alcohol for a year, he could have a liver transplant and live to old age.

O'Neill died on 25 December 2022, at the age of 49, at the facilities of the Médica Uruguaya, where he had been in intensive care with bleeding due to chronic liver disease. He was cremated and his ashes were scattered in Paso de los Toros on 28 December.

== Career statistics ==
Appearances and goals by national team and year
National team	Year	Apps	Goals
Uruguay	1993	1	0
Uruguay	1994	0	0
Uruguay	1995	2	0
Uruguay	1996	1	0
Uruguay	1997	2	0
Uruguay	1998	0	0
Uruguay	1999	2	1
Uruguay	2000	6	0
Uruguay	2001	1	0
Uruguay	2002	4	1
Total		19	2

Scores and results list Uruguay's goal tally first, score column indicates score after each O'Neill goal.

List of international goals scored by Fabián O'Neill
No.	Date	Venue	Opponent	Score	Result	Competition
1	18 August 1999	Estadio Luis Tróccoli, Montevideo, Uruguay	Costa Rica	3–1	5–4	Friendly
2	27 March 2002	Prince Mohamed bin Fahd Stadium, Dammam, Saudi Arabia	Saudi Arabia	2–3	2–3	Friendly

== Honours ==
Nacional

- Uruguayan Primera División: 1992
