= Santa Isabel, Paso de los Toros =

Church in Paso de los Toros, Uruguay

Coordinates: 32.8112°S 56.5086°W

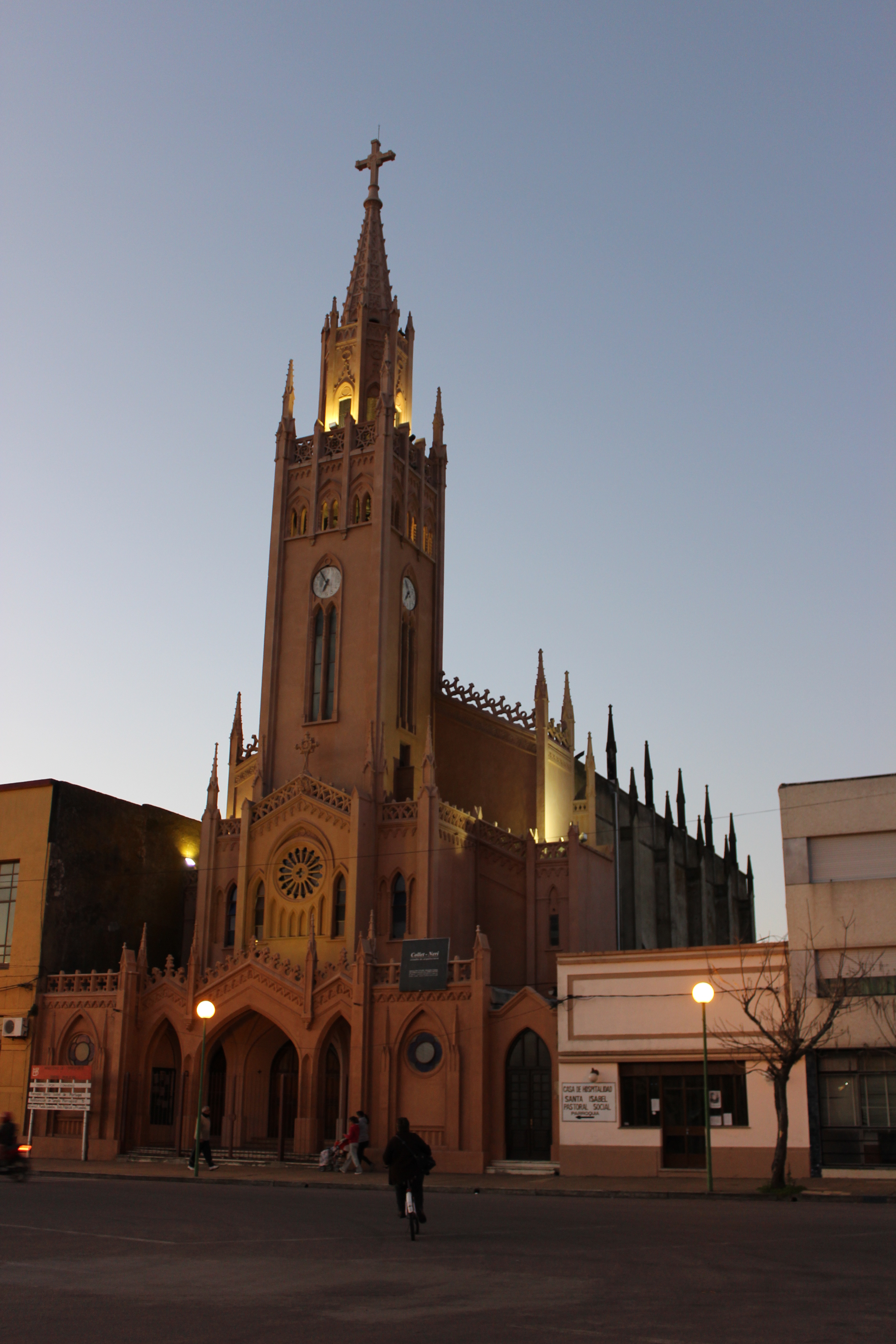
St. Elizabeth's Church, Paso de los Toros.

Saint Elizabeth's Parish Church (Spanish: Parroquia de Santa Isabel) is a Roman Catholic parish church in Paso de los Toros, Uruguay.

The parish was established in 1903. The church, dedicated to Saint Elizabeth of Portugal, is in Gothic Revival style.
