= List of Uruguayan businesspeople =

A list of notable Uruguayan businesspeople.

== A ==
- Francisco Aguilar y Leal
- Ricardo Alarcón (Uruguay)
- Aarón de Anchorena
- Timoteo Aparicio
- Lætitia d'Arenberg
- Hernando Arias de Saavedra
- José Gervasio Artigas

== B ==
- Enrique Baliño
- Barón de Mauá
- Domingo Bordaberry
- Juan María Bordaberry
- Santiago Bordaberry
- José de Buschental

== C ==
- Mario Carminatti
- Washington Cataldi

== E ==
- Julián de Gregorio Espinosa

== F ==
- Wilson Ferreira Aldunate
- Venancio Flores
- Daniel Fonseca

== G ==
- Perfecto Giot
- Juan Balbín González Vallejo
- Juan Gorlero
- Juan Grompone

== H ==
- Luis Alberto de Herrera
- Francisco Hocquart

== J ==
- Juan D. Jackson
- Nicolás Jodal
- Julio Sánchez Padilla

== L ==
- Samuel Lafone
- Francisco Lecocq
- Carlos Alberto Lecueder
- Mauricio Litman
- Antonio Lussich
- Juan Carlos López Mena

== M ==
- Francisco Antonio Maciel
- Julio Mailhos
- Luis Eduardo Mallo
- Marcelo Mazzini
- Benito Medero
- Mercedes Menafra
- Natalio Michelizzi

== N ==
- Edgardo Novick

== P ==
- Fernando Parrado
- Jorge Peirano Facio
- Walter Pintos Risso
- Francisco Piria
- Humberto Pittamiglio
- Samuel Priliac
- Alfredo Puig Spangenberg

== R ==
- Emilio Reus
- Blanca Rodríguez
- Alejo Rossell y Rius

== S ==
- Elvira Salvo de Romay
- Aparicio Saravia
- Basilicio Saravia
- Irineu Evangelista de Sousa

== T ==
- Thomas Tomkinson

== V ==
- José Joaquín de Viana
- Federico Vidiella
- Francisco Vidiella
- Leonel Viera
- Miguel Antonio Vilardebó
- José Villar
- José Villar Gómez
