= SNCF BB 20011 and 20012 =

SNCF BB 20011 SNCF BB 20012
Type and origin
- Power type: Electric
- Model: SNCF BB 22200
- Rebuild date: 1985 : 20011 rebuilt from 22379; 1986 : 20012 rebuilt from 22380; 1994 : both rebuilt for TTU (Note: TTU from Transmanche (cross channel) + TVM (Transmission Voie-Machine) + UM (Unité Multiple / Multiple units)); 1995 : both rebuilt to standard BB 22200
Specifications
- Gauge: 1,435 mm (4 ft 8 1/2 in) standard gauge

The SNCF BB 20011 and SNCF BB 20012 were electric locomotives used for testing, built by Alsthom between 1985 and 1986. The two locomotives were the synchronous dual-voltage prototypes for Class BB 26000.

In 1994 the locomotives were re-used for work on the Channel Tunnel, then converted to standard class BB 22200s in 1995.

== History ==
=== SNCF BB 26000 test locomotives ===
In 1985 and 1986 the SNCF BB 22200 locomotives numbers 22379 and 22380 were modified to test dual voltage electric traction equipment, the microprocessor control, and auxiliary variable speed induction motors. 20012 was used to test the combination of pneumatic brake system and electric brake system.

=== Channel tunnel machines ===
In 1994 the units were used in the Channel Tunnel as motor engines for TTU trains. (Channel tunnel freight engines)

=== Conversion to standard locomotives ===
In 1995 the locomotives were converted back to standard SNCF Class BB 22200 type.

== Miniature models ==
The locomotive 20011 has been produced by Märklin and Roco in HO scale.
