= Paso de los Toros (drink) =

Uruguayan carbonated soft drink

- Product type: Soft drink
- Current owner: PepsiCo (1955–present)
- Country: Uruguay
- Introduced: c. 1929; 97 years ago
- Previous owners: Rómulo Mangini (1929–55)

Paso de los Toros (English: 'Bulls' Crossing') is a Uruguayan commercial line of carbonated soft drinks named after the Uruguayan city Paso de los Toros. Originally produced by a local company owned by Rómulo Mangini, it is currently owned and marketed by PepsiCo.

Originally being a name for tonic water, Paso de los Toros was expanded into a line in itself, with the inclusion of lemon and grapefruit flavored drinks.

== History ==
In the 1920s the city of Paso de Los Toros had a population of approximately 8,000 inhabitants. Among them was a Welshman, Jorge Jones, who moved there to work on the railroads. Rómulo Mangini, a chemistry student from Montevideo also moved there with his wife to work in his in-law's business. A short while later, the chemist opened a soda factory where he produced soap and later on soft drinks with fruit flavors. It was an afternoon in 1926 when these two men met at a club called "25 de Agosto". Jones challenged the young chemist to try to come up with a formula to produce tonic water similar to the one that was currently being sold in Uruguay, Bull Dog, an English brand. Jones knew the components and Mangini would try to work out the exact proportions.

Mangini accepted the challenge and for months tried out different formulas and with each new formula he would go to the club and have Jones try them out. Finally after several attempts, one day in 1929, they reached their objective. Originally named "Príncipe de Gales", the beverage was then renamed "Paso de los Toros". According to Jones' refined palate, the Uruguayan tonic water had successfully surpassed the one imported from London. The drink was a success and quickly it outgrew its staff and facilities. In 1947 "Sociedad Anónima de Agua Tónica Paso de los Toros" was founded and shares were sold at ten pesos each. In 1950 as the demand for the drink increased, Mangini decided to open up a factory in Montevideo.

In 1955, the majority of the stockholders had sold their shares to Pepsi Cola, which on February 14, 1955 took over the company. This was a hard blow for Mangini who died in 1957. Pepsi completed the acquisition in 1961.

The Paso de los Toros plant closed in early 1960s. In 2020, it was revealed that the abandoned factory became a hotel after a local entrepreneur had bought and refurbished it. Its owner also planned to launch a mineral water branded Don Rómulo. As a result, PepsiCo sued him alleging trademark infringement.
