= Uruguayans =

Citizens or residents of Uruguay

Uruguayos

Total population
- c. 4 million^{[a]}

Regions with significant populations
- Uruguay 3,444,263 (2023 Census)
- Diaspora total: c. 630,000
- Argentina: 95,384
- Spain: 83,601
- Brazil: 62,781
- United States: 48,234
- Australia: 10,000
- Canada: 7,660
- Chile: 6,116 (2021)
- France: 2,784
- Italy: 1,170
- Israel: 6,202
- Mexico: 3,309
- Colombia: 1,000

Languages
- Primarily Spanish; Portuguese (minority)

Religion
- Predominantly Roman Catholicism; Significant minority:Irreligion

Related ethnic groups
- Other South Americans (especially Argentines, Southern Brazilians, and Southeastern Brazilians)
- a. The total figure is merely an estimation; sum of all the referenced populations.

Uruguayans (Spanish: uruguayos) are people identified with the country of Uruguay, through citizenship or descent. Uruguay is home to people of different ethnic origins. As a result, many Uruguayans do not equate their nationality with ethnicity, but with citizenship and their allegiance to Uruguay. Colloquially, primarily among other Spanish-speaking Latin American nations, Uruguayans are also referred to as "orientals [as in Easterners]" (Spanish: orientales).

Uruguay is, along with much of the Americas, a melting pot of different peoples, with the difference that it has traditionally maintained a model that promotes cultural assimilation, hence the different cultures have been absorbed by the mainstream. Uruguay has one of the most homogeneous populations in South America; the most common ethnic backgrounds by far being those from Spain, Italy, Germany and France i.e. Spanish Uruguayans, Italian Uruguayans, German Uruguayans, French Uruguayans and Polish Uruguayans.

== Immigration waves ==
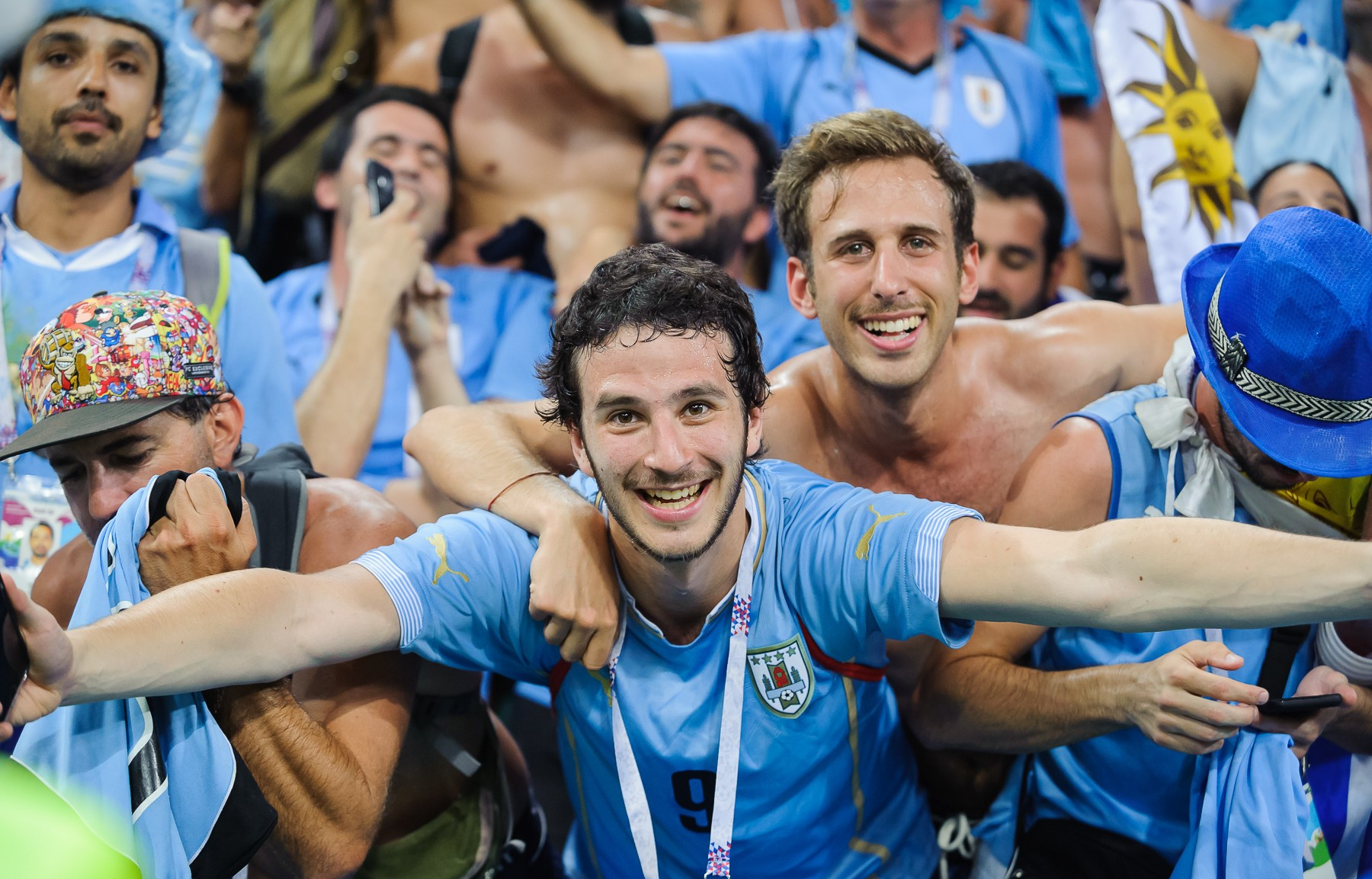
Uruguayan fans cheering on their country during the 2018 World Cup.

Most Uruguayans descend from colonial-era settlers and immigrants from Europe with almost 86% of the population being of European descent. The majority of these are Spaniards and Italians, followed by the French, Portuguese, Germans, Romanians, Greeks, British (English or Scots), Irish, Poles, Swiss, Russians, Bulgarians, Arab (mainly Lebanese and Syrians), Sephardi and Ashkenazi Jews and children.

There are also smaller numbers of Japanese, as well as Amerindians, mainly Charrúa, Minuán, Chaná, Güenoa and Guaraní. Montevideo, like Buenos Aires in Argentina and Santos in Brazil, was a major seaport to dock ships coming from Europe and elsewhere and European settlement greatly affected Uruguay to have a more western oriented culture.

Many colonies such as Nueva Helvecia-Colonia Suiza, a Swiss settlement, and Colonia Valdense, a Piedmontese Waldensian colony, are located in the department of Colonia. Also, there are towns founded by British settlers, like Conchillas and Barker. Two Russian colonies called San Javier and Colonia Ofir, are found in the department of Río Negro. Also there are Mennonite colonies in the department of Río Negro like Gartental and El Ombú, in Canelones Department called Colonia Nicolich, and in San José Department called Colonia Delta. El Ombú, is famous for its well-known Dulce de Leche "Claldy", and is located near the city of Young.

European immigration in the 19th and 20th centuries heavily influenced Uruguayan culture and lifestyle. The large cities, including its capital Montevideo, have preserved European architecture, the latter being considered one of the greatest exponents of the art deco style.

== Racial and ethnic groups ==
Racial and ethnic composition in Uruguay (2023 census)
Self-identified origin
White	86.0%
Black	10.4%
Indigenous	6.3%
East Asian (Note: The official racial term on the Uruguayan census is "amarilla" or "yellow" in English, which refers to people of East Asian descent.)	0.7%
Other/none	6.3%
Total adds up to more than 100% as people were allowed to choose more than one ancestral group.

The majority of Uruguayans or their ancestors immigrated within the past five centuries, with the exception of the Native American population.

=== Europeans or Whites ===
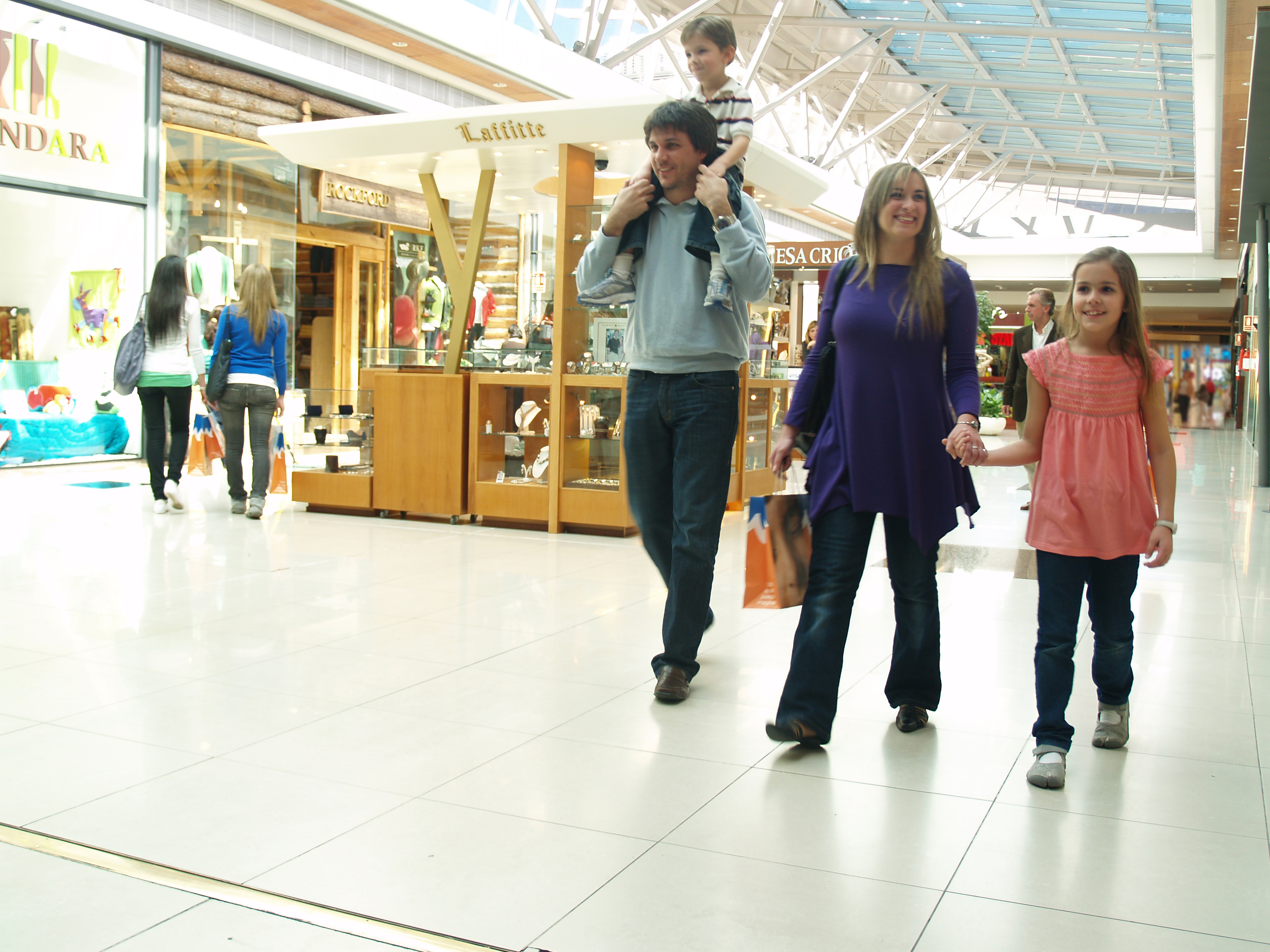
White Uruguayans in a Montevideo shopping mall.

According to the 2023 Uruguay census, 86% of the Uruguayan population chose "white" as their main ancestry, identifying with white racial origins. Early Uruguayans descend from Spanish and Portuguese colonists during the colonial period prior to 1810. Following independence, from the mid-19th to the mid-20th century, significant immigration from across Europe—particularly Italy and Spain—shaped the demographic composition, resulting in a population with richly diverse European ancestry.

Today, Uruguay's culture is influenced heavily by its European roots which is evident in its language, food and other aspects of everyday life.

=== Mestizos & Amerindians ===
Up to 2.4% of the population are of Mestizo (European-Amerindian) ancestry according to the 2011 census. People with Amerindian ancestry can be found in the north of Uruguay, primarily in Tacuarembó Department, where the Amerindian ancestry accounts for 20% of the population.

A 1996 census identified that 12,600 people in Uruguay were Amerindian descendants. In 2006, a census confirmed that there were 115,118 Uruguayans that descended from one Amerindian ethnic group, the Charrúas, reaching up to 4% of the country's population. In 2005, Sinthia Pagano, M.D conducted a genetic study, detecting that 38% of Uruguayans may have expressed partial genetic influence from the Amerindian population. Another study found that 34% of the population has Amerindian admixture.

=== Africans ===
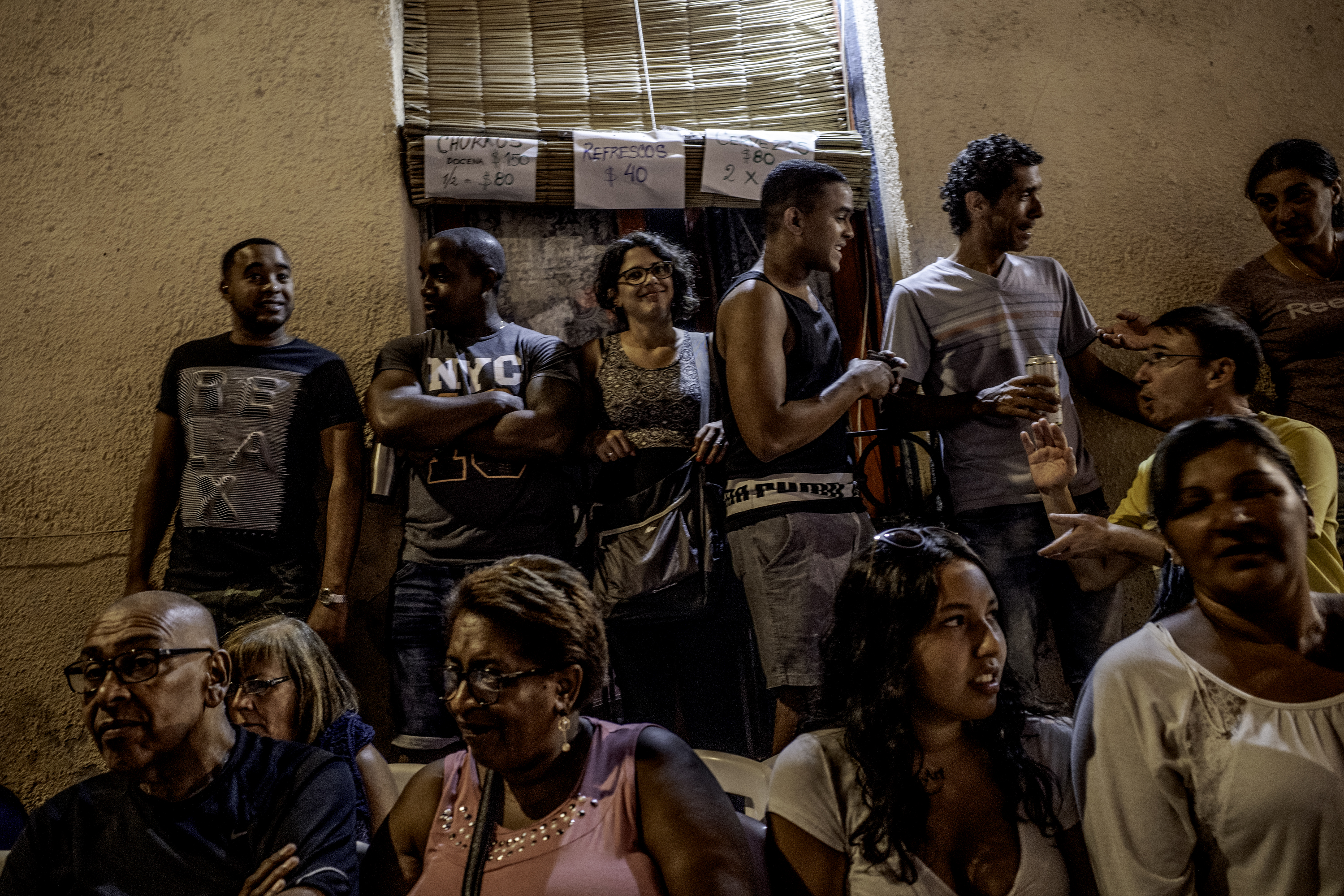
Afro-Uruguayans in the neighborhood of Barrio Sur in Montevideo.

Africans, Blacks and Mulattos in Uruguay are more or less 300,000 and they are mostly found in Montevideo, Rivera Department, Artigas Department, Salto Department and Cerro Largo Department. A 2023 census marked that there are more than 300,000 African descendants and that 80% of Afro-Uruguayans are under the working class line.

== Languages ==
Spanish is the de facto national language. The standard language, virtually spoken by the entire population is Uruguayan Spanish, which is a variant of Rioplatense Spanish. It has a strong influence of the Italian language and its different dialects due to the number of immigrants that the country received.

French and Italian have great relevance in society, having been part of the educational curriculum until the 2000s. On the other hand, in the north-east of the country, the fronteiriço dialect is spoken, a mixture between Uruguayan Spanish and Brazilian Portuguese originated due to cultural exchange between the areas on both sides of the border. English is the most widespread foreign language among the Uruguayan people.

== Culture ==
Contemporary Uruguayan culture comes from the contribution of its alternating early settlers from Spain and Portugal, and important influence of European immigrants – Italians, French, Portuguese, Romanians, and Greeks, among others- and traditions blended with Amerindian and African elements. Uruguay has Portuguese and Spanish colonial architectural heritage and many writers, artists, and musicians. Candombe is the most important example of African influence by slaves. Charrua and Guaraní traditions can be seen in mate, the national drink. Both Uruguay and Argentina share its traditional gaúcho roots (which originated in Andalusia).

=== Religion ===
Religion in Uruguay (2010)
Religion	Percent
Christianity	57.9%
Folk religion	0.8%
Judaism	0.3%
Other religions	0.3%
Unaffiliated	40.7%

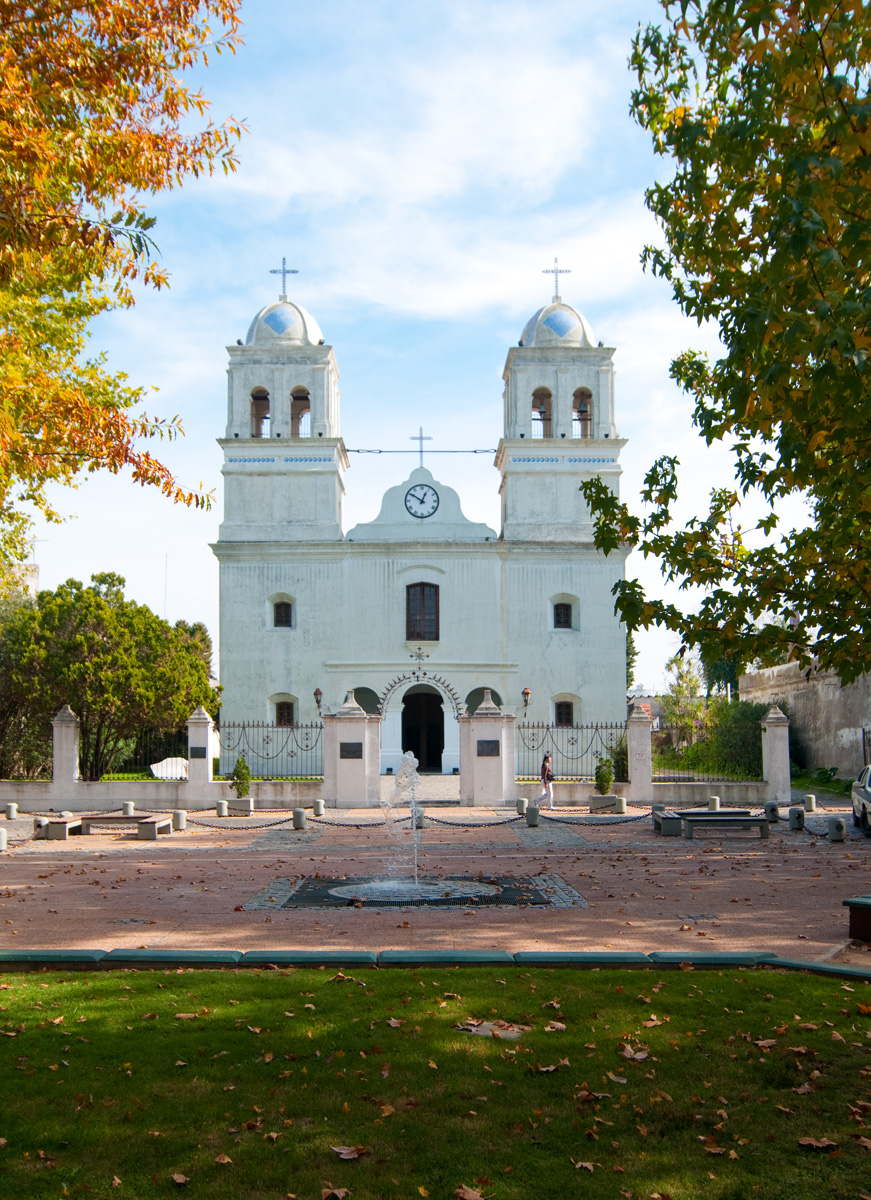
The Church of Saint Charles Borromeo in San Carlos is one of the oldest churches in Uruguay.

Uruguay has no official religion; church and state are officially separated, and religious freedom is guaranteed. A 2008 survey by the INE of Uruguay showed Catholicism as the main religion, with 45.7% of the population; 9.0% are non-Catholic Christians, 0.6% are Animists or Umbandists (an Afro-Brazilian religion), and 0.4% Jewish. 30.1% reported believing in a god, but not belonging to any religion, while 14% were atheist or agnostic.

Political observers consider Uruguay the most secular country in the Americas. Uruguay's secularization began with the relatively minor role of the church in the colonial era, compared with other parts of the Spanish Empire. The small numbers of Uruguay's indigenous peoples and their fierce resistance to proselytism reduced the influence of the ecclesiastical authorities.

In 1837 civil marriage was recognized, and in 1861 the state took over the running of public cemeteries. In 1907 divorce was legalized and, in 1909 all religious instruction was banned from state schools. Under the influence of the innovative Colorado reformer José Batlle y Ordóñez (1903–1911), complete separation of church and state was introduced with the new constitution of 1917.

Uruguay's capital has 12 synagogues, and a community of 20,000 Jews by 2011. With a peak of 50,000 during the mid-1960s, Uruguay has the world's highest rate of aliyah as a percentage of the Jewish population.

Official survey results	2006	2007	2008
Christianity	56.1	55.6	54.3
Catholic	46.0	45.1	44.8
Other Christian	10.1	10.5	9.5
No religion	42.6	42.9	44.5
Unaffiliated believer	26.9	27.8	30.1
Atheist	15.7	15.1	12.3
Agnostic	15.7	15.1	2.1
Jewish	0.4	0.4	0.3
Animist and Umbanda	0.6	0.7	0.7
Other	0.3	0.4	0.2

The Baháʼí Faith is also practiced, along with Afro-Brazilian religions such as Quimbanda, Candomblé, and Umbanda.

=== Music ===
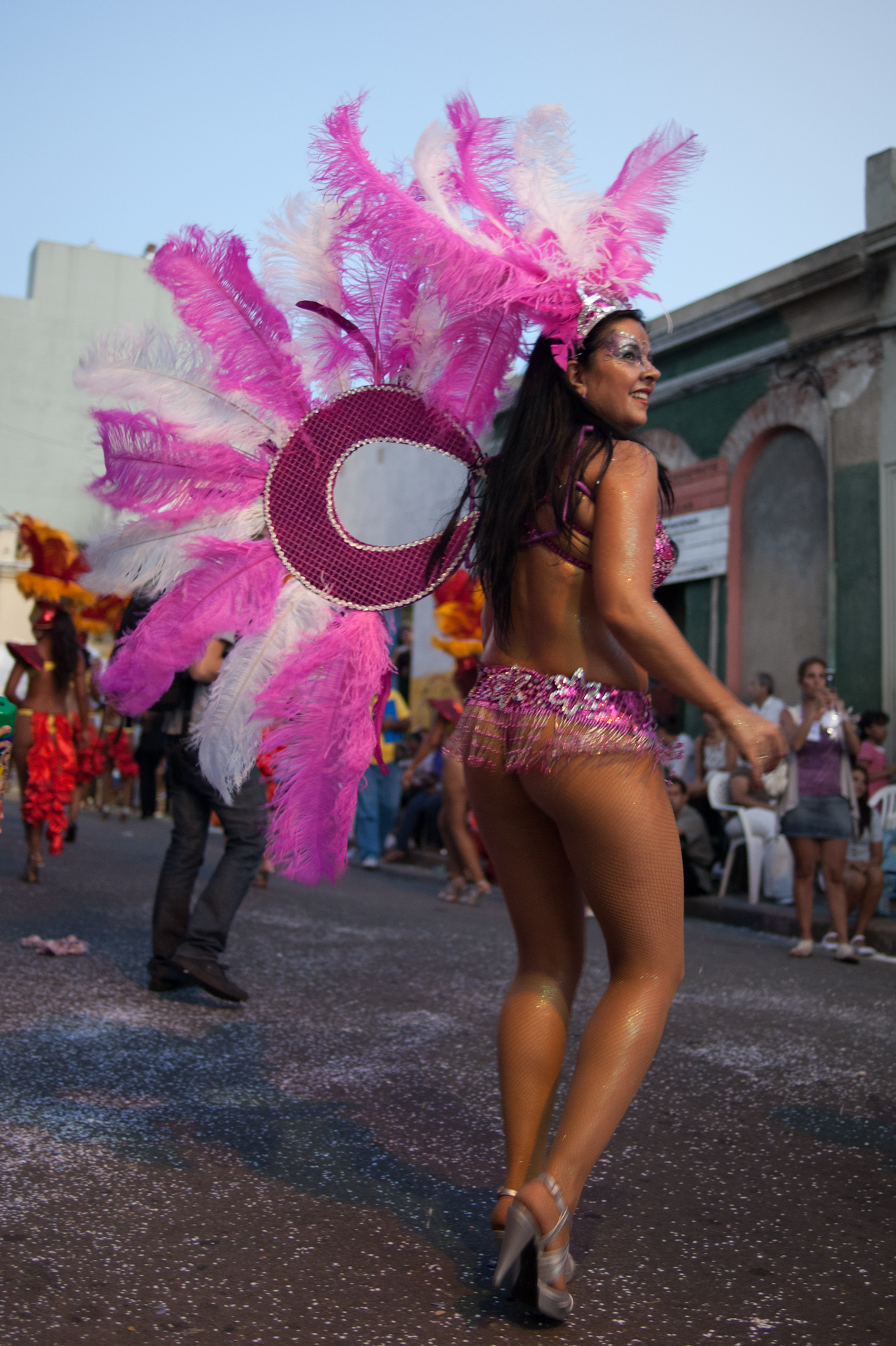
The Desfile de Llamadas carnival in Montevideo

Music of Uruguay includes a number of local musical forms. The most distinctive ones are tango, murga, a form of musical theater, and candombe, an Afro-Uruguayan type of music which occur yearly during the Carnival period. There is also milonga, a folk guitar and song form deriving from Spanish traditions and related to similar forms found in many Hispanic-American countries. The famed tango singer Carlos Gardel was born in Toulouse, France, then raised in Buenos Aires, but as an adult he obtained legal papers saying he was born in Tacuarembó, probably to avoid French military authorities.

"La cumparsita" (little street procession, a grammatical diminutive of la comparsa) is a tango written in 1916 by the Uruguayan musician Gerardo Matos Rodríguez, It is among the most famous and recognizable tangos of all time.

The popular music of Uruguay, which focuses on rock, jazz, and many other forms, frequently makes reference to the distinctly Uruguayan sounds mentioned above. The group Los Shakers, similar to the Beatles, deserve a special mention as the band that kickstarted the Uruguayan rock scene.

=== Gaucho ===
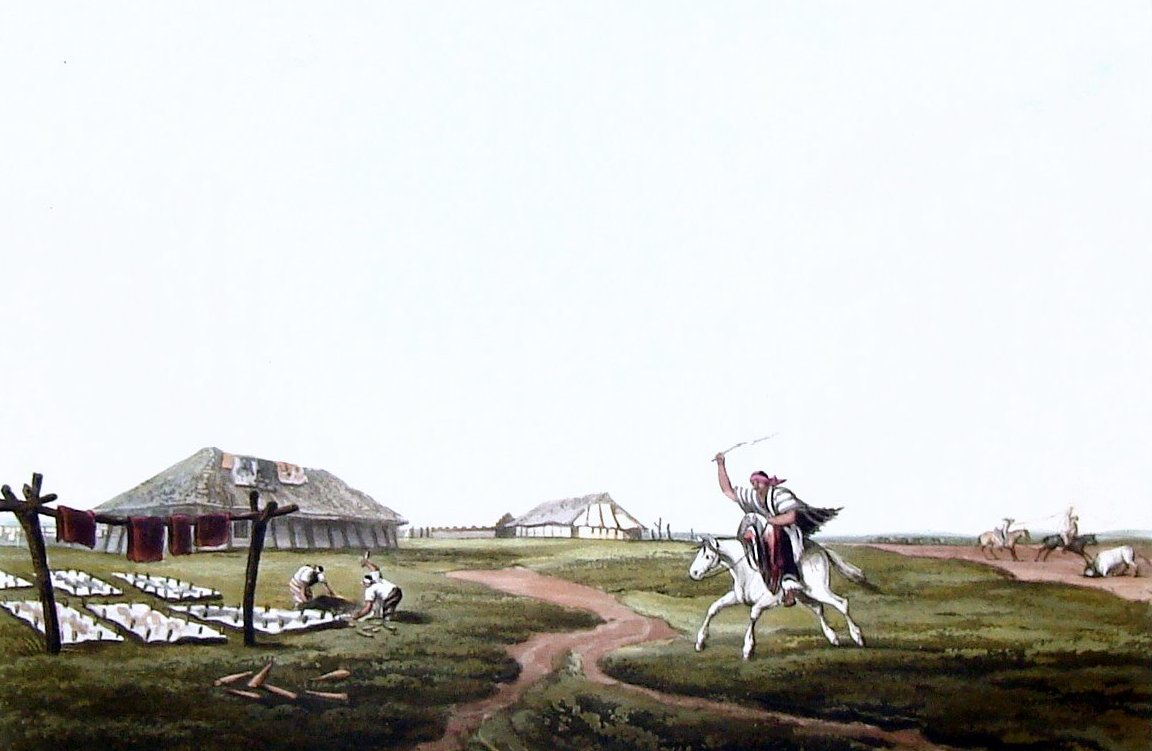
The earliest securely dated depiction of a Uruguayan gaucho (1820)

The gaucho is a national symbol in Uruguay and Argentina but is also a strong culture in Paraguay and southern Brazil. Gauchos became greatly admired and renowned in legends, folklore and literature and became an important part of their regional cultural tradition.

== Emigration ==
The rate of Uruguayan emigration to Europe is especially high in Spain, Portugal, Italy, France. In the Americas, emigration is mostly to the United States, Canada, Argentina, and other nearby Latin American countries such as Brazil and Chile. In Oceania, emigration is mainly to Australia, and to a lesser extent, New Zealand.

== See also ==
- List of Uruguayans
- List of Uruguayan businesspeople
- Demographics of Uruguay
- Uruguayan diaspora
- Hispanics
- Criollo people
- Italic peoples
- Uruguayan Americans
