= Paso de los Toros =

- City
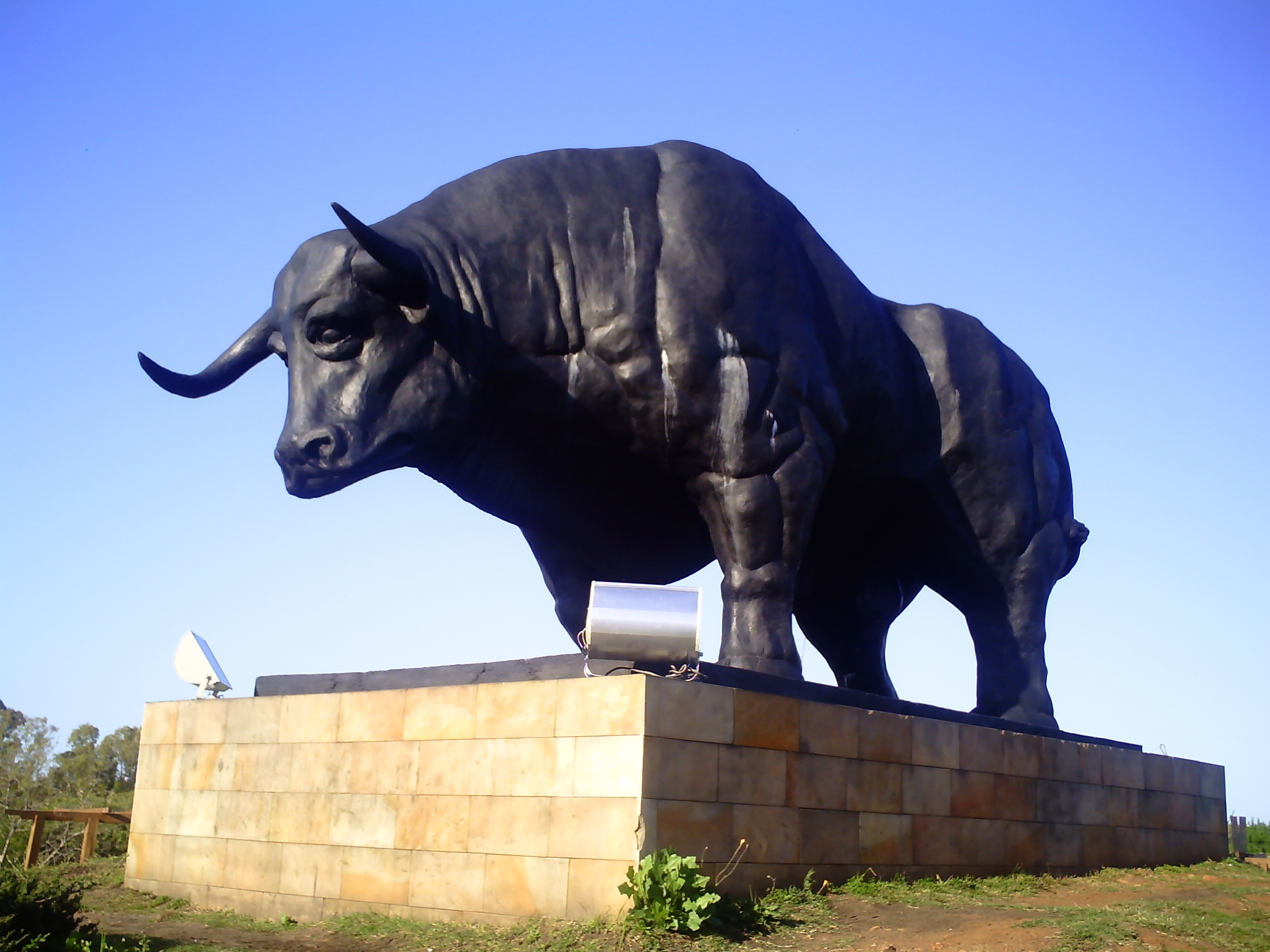
- Monument in El Toro Square

- Location in Uruguay
- Coordinates: 32°49′05″S 56°30′23″W
- Country: Uruguay
- Department: Tacuarembó

Population (2011 Census)
  - Total: 12,985
  - Demonym: isabelino
- Time zone: UTC -3
- Postal code: 45100
- Dial plan: +598 4664 (+4 digits)
- Website: municipiopasodelostoros.gub.uy

Paso de los Toros (Bulls' Crossing) is a city of the Tacuarembó Department in Uruguay.

== History ==
The Midland Uruguay Railway began operation in 1889 with a line that ran between Paso de los Toros and Salto. On 17 July 1903, the group of houses of the area known as Paso de los Toros was declared a "Pueblo" (village) named "Santa Isabel" and became head of the judicial section of the same name. On 27 November 1929 it was renamed to "Paso de los Toros" and its status was elevated to "Villa" (town) by the Act of Ley Nº 8.523. On 1 July 1953, its status was further elevated to "Ciudad" (city) by the Act of Ley Nº 11.952.

== Population ==
In 2011, Paso de los Toros had a population of 12,985, which makes it the second largest city in the department, after the capital city of Tacuarembó.

| Year | Population |
|---|---|
| 1908 | 4,963 |
| 1963 | 11,359 |
| 1975 | 13,032 |
| 1985 | 13,026 |
| 1996 | 13,315 |
| 2004 | 13,231 |
| 2011 | 12,985 |

Source: Instituto Nacional de Estadística de Uruguay

== Geography ==
The city is located on the north bank of Río Negro and on Route 5, about 140 kilometres (87 mi) south-southwest of Tacuarembó, the capital of the department, and about 66 kilometres (41 mi) north of Durazno, the capital of Durazno Department.

=== Climate ===
Climate data for Paso de los Toros (1980–2009)
| Month | Jan | Feb | Mar | Apr | May | Jun | Jul | Aug | Sep | Oct | Nov | Dec | Year |
|---|---|---|---|---|---|---|---|---|---|---|---|---|---|
| Record high °C (°F) | 42.8 (109.0) | 41.0 (105.8) | 38.6 (101.5) | 36.0 (96.8) | 32.3 (90.1) | 28.8 (83.8) | 30.3 (86.5) | 33.2 (91.8) | 35.5 (95.9) | 36.0 (96.8) | 39.5 (103.1) | 40.9 (105.6) | 42.8 (109.0) |
| Mean daily maximum °C (°F) | 31.1 (88.0) | 29.5 (85.1) | 27.8 (82.0) | 23.6 (74.5) | 19.7 (67.5) | 16.6 (61.9) | 16.2 (61.2) | 18.4 (65.1) | 19.9 (67.8) | 23.3 (73.9) | 26.3 (79.3) | 29.3 (84.7) | 23.5 (74.3) |
| Daily mean °C (°F) | 24.9 (76.8) | 23.9 (75.0) | 22.4 (72.3) | 18.5 (65.3) | 14.8 (58.6) | 12.0 (53.6) | 11.5 (52.7) | 13.1 (55.6) | 14.6 (58.3) | 17.8 (64.0) | 20.5 (68.9) | 23.1 (73.6) | 18.1 (64.6) |
| Mean daily minimum °C (°F) | 18.7 (65.7) | 18.3 (64.9) | 16.9 (62.4) | 13.5 (56.3) | 10.0 (50.0) | 7.4 (45.3) | 6.7 (44.1) | 7.9 (46.2) | 9.3 (48.7) | 12.3 (54.1) | 14.6 (58.3) | 17.0 (62.6) | 12.7 (54.9) |
| Record low °C (°F) | 7.6 (45.7) | 4.0 (39.2) | 4.6 (40.3) | 1.4 (34.5) | −1.7 (28.9) | −5.0 (23.0) | −5.0 (23.0) | −3.3 (26.1) | −1.6 (29.1) | 0.4 (32.7) | 3.2 (37.8) | 6.3 (43.3) | −5.0 (23.0) |
| Average precipitation mm (inches) | 108.1 (4.26) | 127.5 (5.02) | 114.7 (4.52) | 156.3 (6.15) | 119.4 (4.70) | 99.3 (3.91) | 88.4 (3.48) | 77.3 (3.04) | 95.3 (3.75) | 117.7 (4.63) | 111.6 (4.39) | 105.9 (4.17) | 1,321.7 (52.04) |
| Average precipitation days (≥ 1.0 mm) | 6 | 7 | 6 | 6 | 6 | 6 | 7 | 6 | 6 | 7 | 6 | 6 | 75 |
| Average relative humidity (%) | 63 | 68 | 71 | 75 | 79 | 81 | 79 | 76 | 73 | 71 | 67 | 63 | 72 |
| Mean monthly sunshine hours | 282.1 | 228.8 | 229.4 | 186.0 | 170.5 | 135.0 | 155.0 | 179.8 | 192.0 | 220.1 | 255.0 | 285.2 | 2,518.9 |
| Mean daily sunshine hours | 9.3 | 8.1 | 7.4 | 6.2 | 5.5 | 4.5 | 5.0 | 5.8 | 6.4 | 7.1 | 8.5 | 9.2 | 6.9 |
Source 1: Instituto Nacional de Investigación Agropecuaria
Source 2: Dirección Nacional de Meteorología (precipitation days 1961–1990, extremes 1937–1994)

== Places of worship ==
- St. Elizabeth Parish Church (Roman Catholic)

== Soft drink ==
In Uruguay, Pepsi manufactures a Paso de los Toros soft drink named after the city.

== Noted local people ==
- Fabián O'Neill: football player
- Jairo O'Neil: football player
- Mario Benedetti: writer
- Nelson Acosta: football manager
- Víctor Púa: football manager
- Waldemar Rial: basketball player
