= SNCF Class BB 26000 =

Class of 234 French electric locomotives

SNCF BB 26000 Sybic
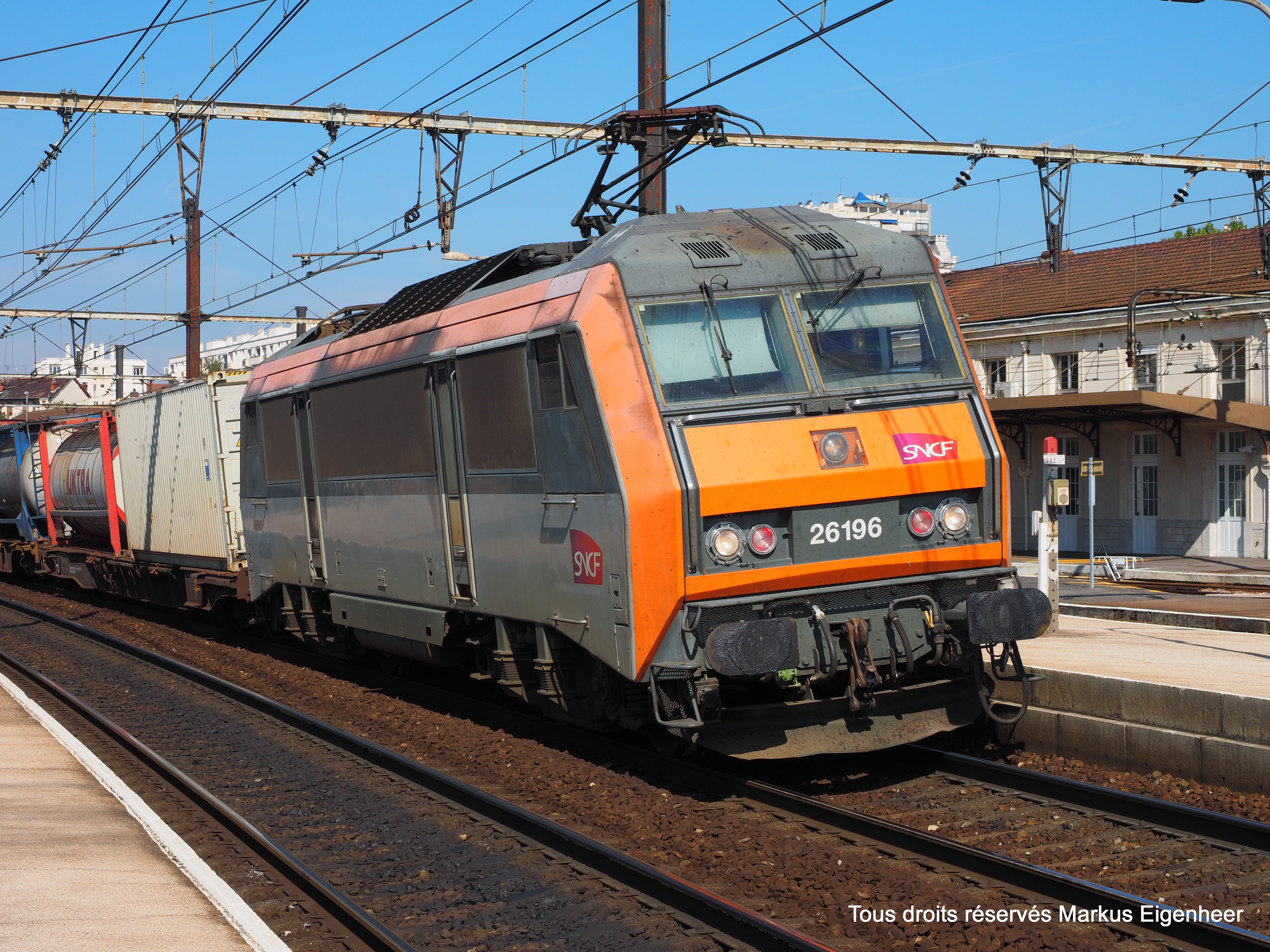
- SNCF BB26196
Type and origin
- Power type: Electric
- Builder: GEC Alsthom / MTE
- Build date: 1988-1998
- Total produced: 234
Specifications
- Configuration
  - UIC: B'B'
- Gauge: 1,435 mm (4 ft 8 1/2 in)
- Wheel diameter: new 1,256 mm (49 7/16 in), worn 1,180 mm (46 7/16 in)
- Minimum curve: →
- Wheelbase: bogie pivot distance 9.684 m (31 ft 9 1/4 in) axle distance 2.797 m (9 ft 2 1/8 in)
- Length: 17.71 m (58 ft 1 1/4 in)
- Width: 3.026 m (9 ft 11 1/8 in) (or 2.93 m (9 ft 7 1/3 in)
- Height: 4.270 m (14 ft 1/8 in)
- Loco weight: 88.825 tonnes (87.422 long tons; 97.913 short tons)
- Electric system/s: Catenary; 25 kV AC or 1500 V DC
- Current pickup: Pantograph
- Loco brake: Electro-dynamic Rheostatic, Mechanical disc brakes, and parking brake
Performance figures
- Maximum speed: 200 km/h (124 mph)
- Power output: 5.6 MW (7,510 hp)
- Tractive effort: starting 320 kN (71,900 lb_{f}) at 80 km/h (50 mph) 220 kN (49,500 lb_{f}) at 200 km/h (124 mph) 100 kN (22,500 lb_{f})
Career
- Numbers: 26001-26234

The SNCF BB 26000 locomotives are a class of dual voltage, four axle B'B' electric locomotives capable of a top speed of 200 km/h built by GEC Alsthom between 1988 and 1998 for SNCF. The locomotives are also commonly known as the Sybics. (Note: From Synchronous Bicurrent, referring to synchronous motor drive, and dual voltage operation (French: Synchrone Bicourant))

== Design and development ==
The class were built to fulfil both freight and passenger roles; the specifications included the ability to haul 16 Corail coaches at 200 km/h (124 mph) on a 0.25% gradient, and to haul a 2,050 t (2,018 long tons; 2,260 short tons) freight train at 80 km/h (50 mph) on a 0.88% gradient.

The locomotives are a two cabin design with the body built out of steel, two pantographs are fitted; one for 1500 V operation, the other for 25 kV operation. A 25 kV AC supply is stepped down and rectified to 1500 V, a 1500 V supply feeds the power electronics directly. Each of the three elements of the thyristor bridge based (Note: The back EMF (ie electrical generator effect) of the synchronous motor provides a reversed electric potential forcing the commutation of the thyristor. A separate circuit commutates the thyristor at low speeds.) three phase inverter circuits are connected in parallel, with the two three phase supplies per motor being series connected. For speeds below 15 km/h (9.3 mph) one supply voltage reducing chopper circuit (French:hacheur) per motor bogie is used to assist control. The power electronics of the two motor bogies are connected in parallel, and are evaporatively cooled by boiling Freon 113.

The bogies are a monomoteur design, (Note: Monomoteur (English: mono-motor or single motor) - a single (2.8MW) electric motor is mounted in the bogie and drives both axles) with helical spring primarily suspension.

The traction motors are three phase synchronous type (as used in the contemporary TGV Atlantique) but with two three phase stator windings offset by 30 degrees. (Note: A "double star" (French: double étoile) type with 12 pole elements was used for the BB 26000 locomotives, whereas the single three phase motors used in the TGV Atlantique had only 6 stator poles set 60 degrees apart) Drive from the traction motors to wheel is via a floating ring vibration isolation element (French:anneau dansant) and hollow shaft drive.

Mono-motor bogies were chosen based on the good performance in the SNCF BB 22200, SNCF BB 15000 and SNCF BB 7200 classes. A synchronous motor was chosen over a commutated motor or an asynchronous motor due to the reduced mass, simplicity of equipment, and price.

Two locomotives SNCF BB 20011 and 20012 were used to develop and test the dual voltage traction system, microprocessor control systems and auxiliary motors, BB 20012 was used to develop and test the pneumatic and electrical braking system.

The Paris-based industrial design group MBD Design contributed to the design of the locomotive.

== History and operations ==
264 of the class were ordered by SNCF, only 234 were built, the last 30 of the order were instead built as a new triple voltage design capable of also operating on 3 kV DC; these used asynchronous electric motors and became the SNCF Class BB 36000 (Asytrit).

The class have been used in most regions of France.

In June 2000 26084 was involved in an accident caused by sabotage near Chasse-sur-Rhône, and is no longer in service. As of 2009 the remaining 233 machines are still in operation in France. As of December 2024, only 140 machines remain in service.

== Liveries ==
The locomotives were originally delivered in an orange and grey livery. Other liveries carried include the Fret SNCF green livery, the red and grey multiservice and TER Alsace liveries and the purple and silver En voyage livery.

The different liveries of the BB 26000 Sybic

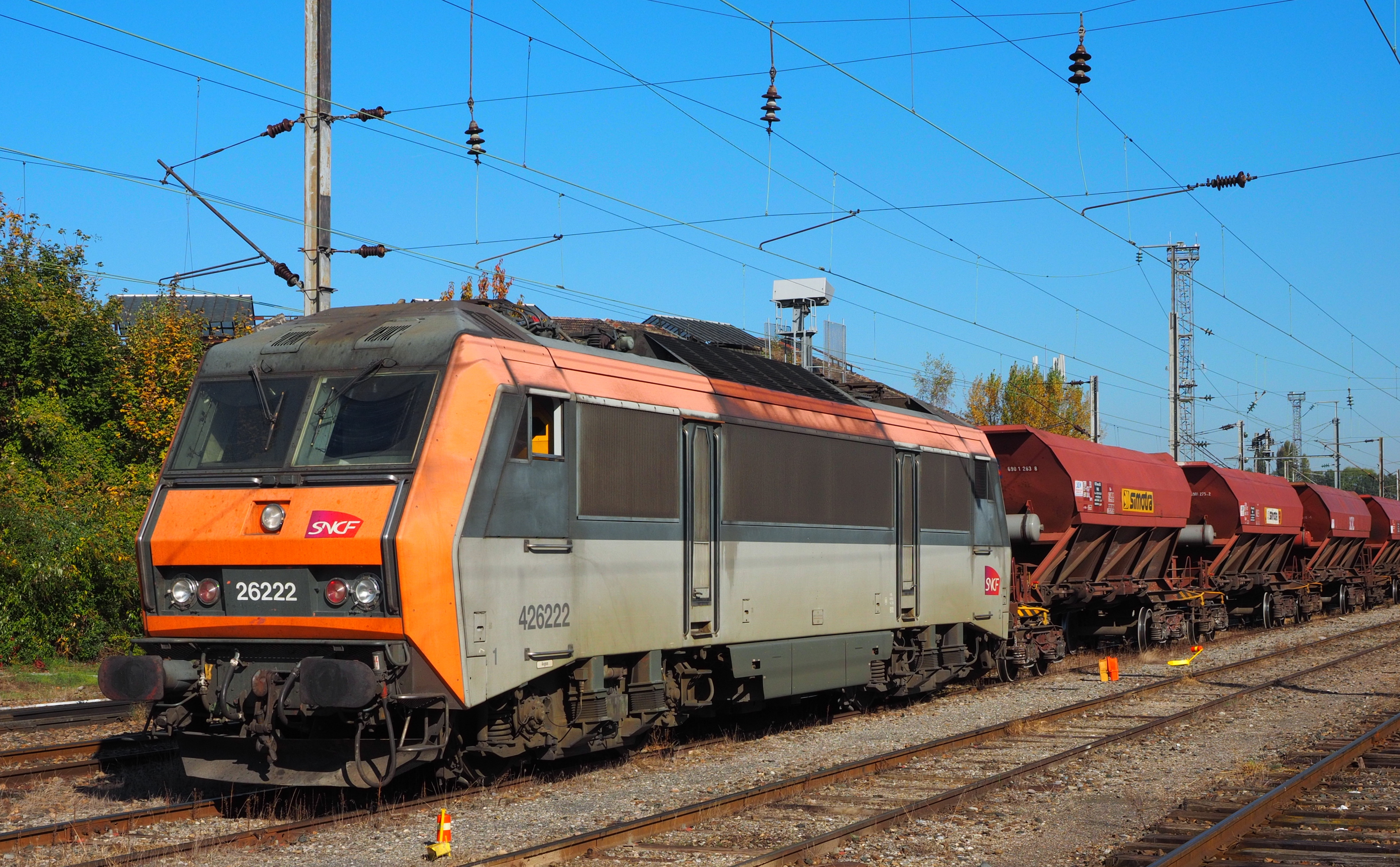
Original orange livery on BB 26222.

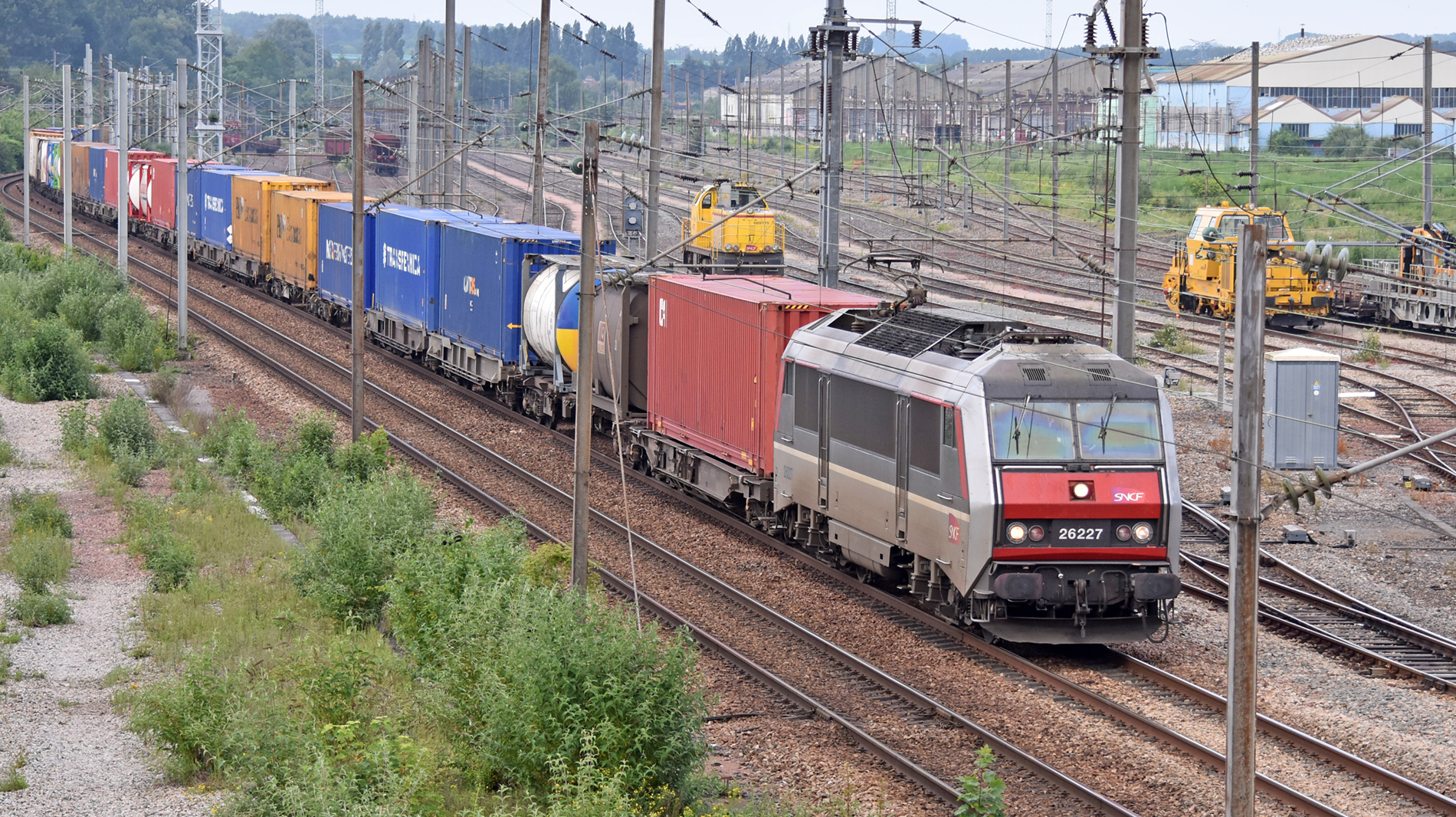
“Multiservices” livery on BB 26227.

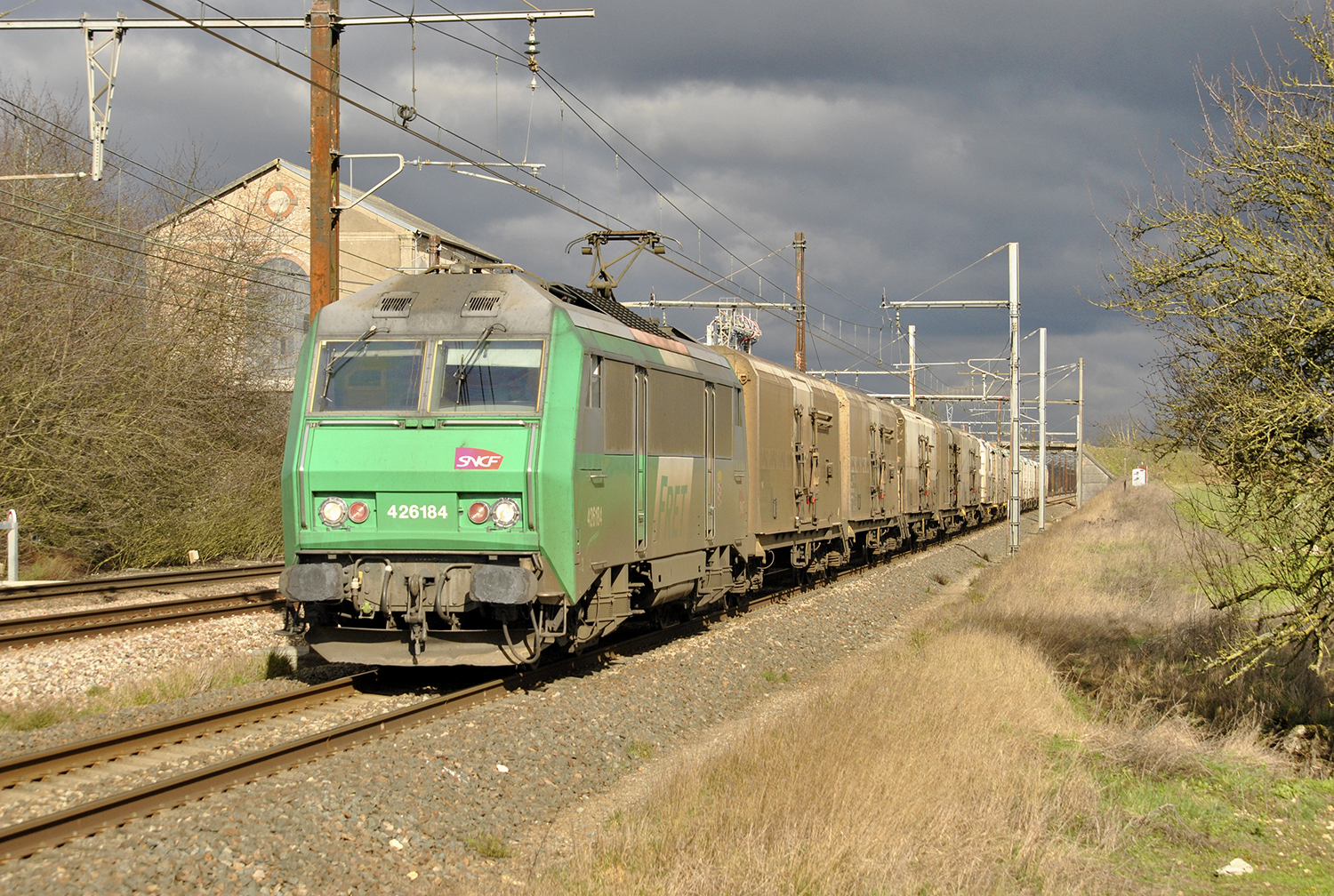
“Freight” livery on BB 26184.

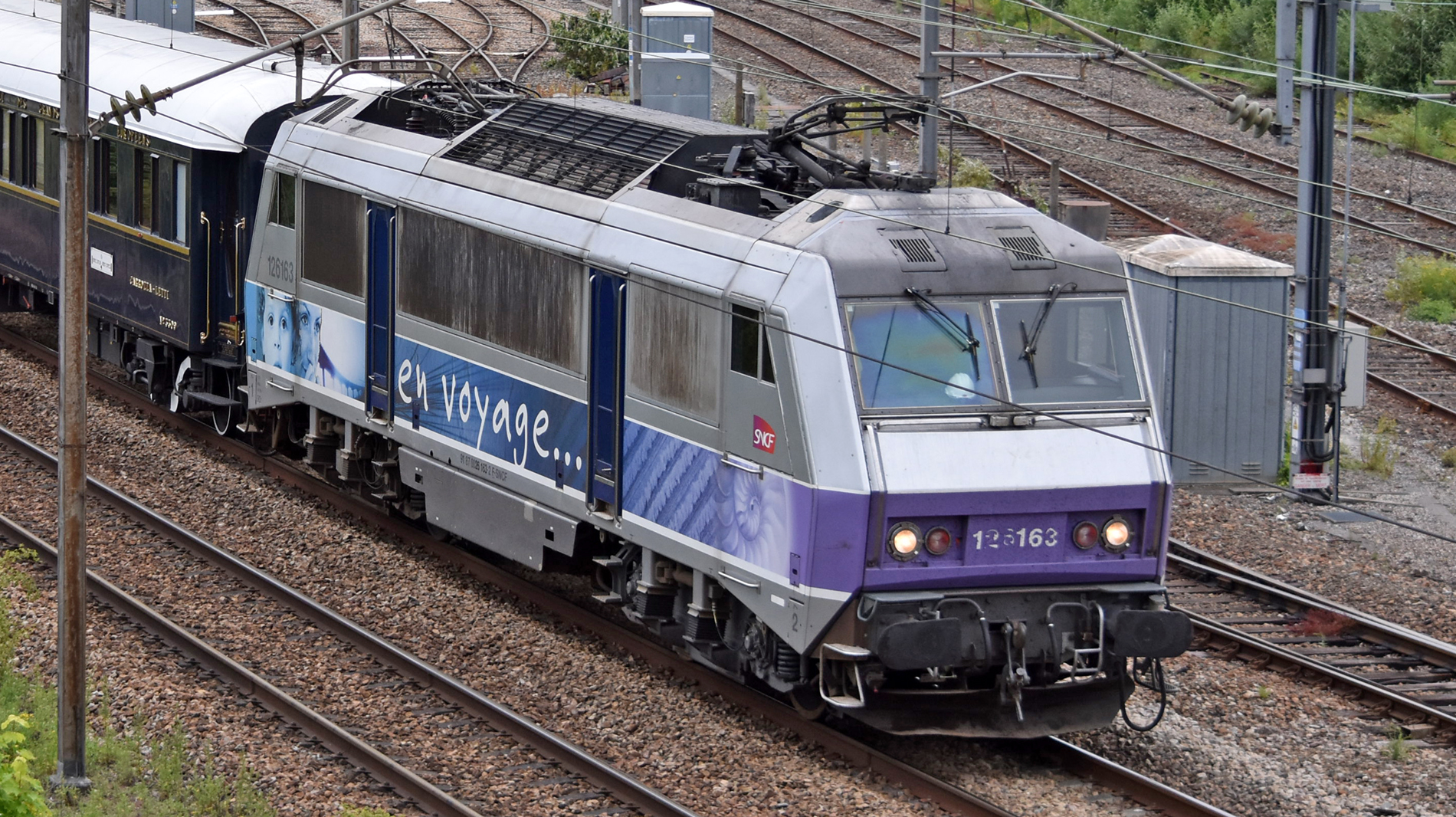
"En Voyage" livery seen from the purple side on BB 26163.

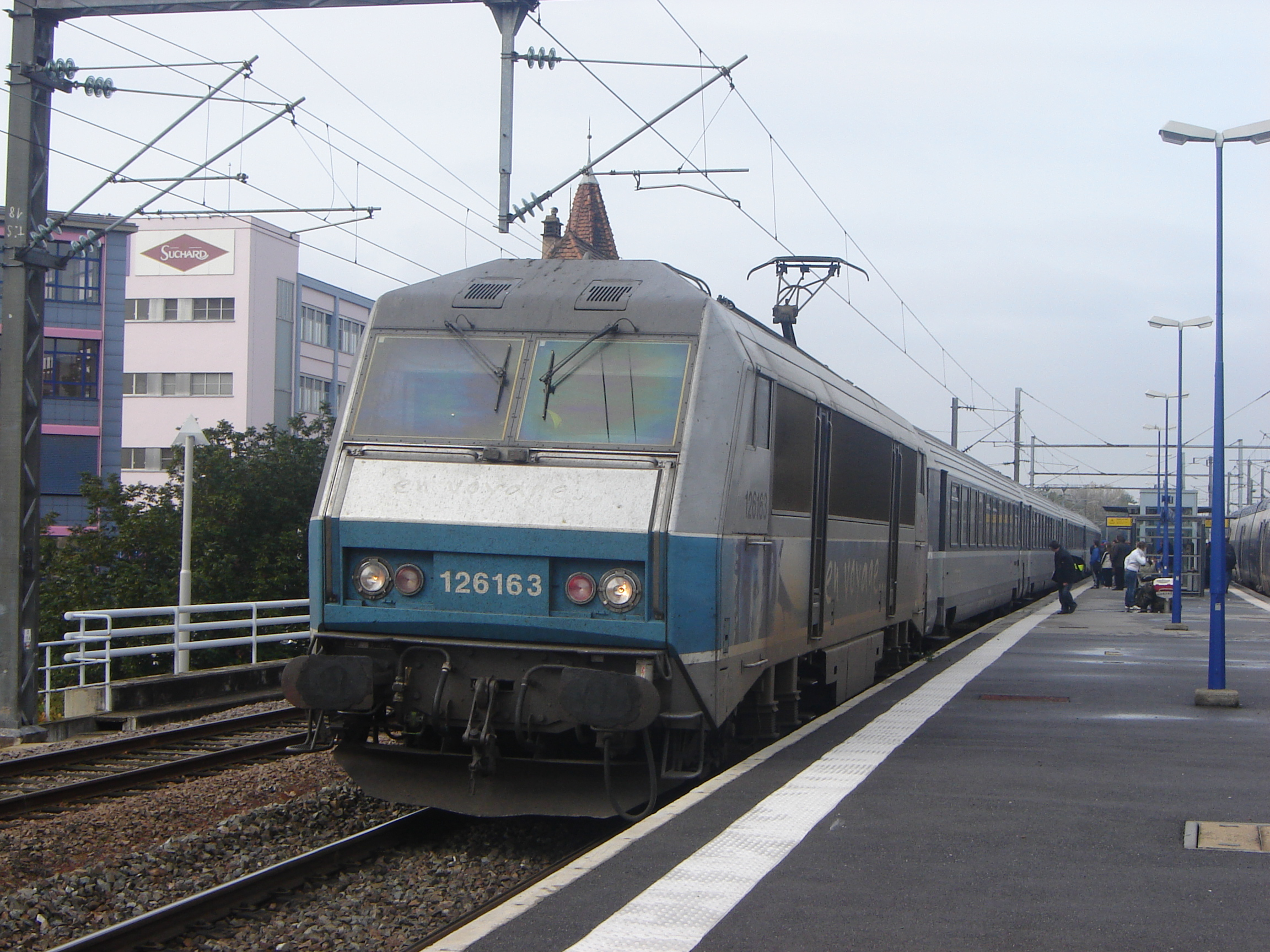
"En Voyage" livery seen from the blue side on the BB 26163.

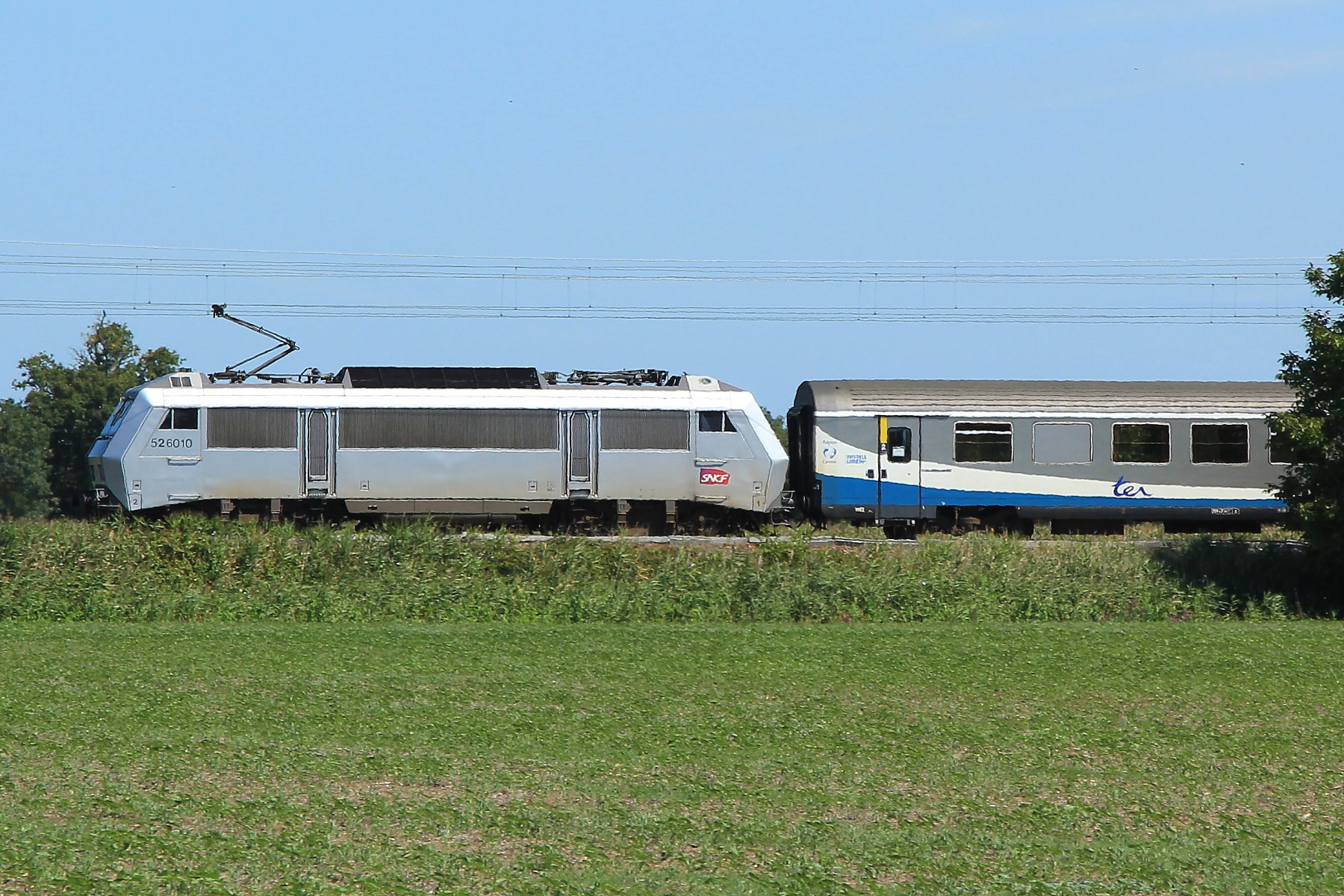
"Grey" livery on the BB 26010.

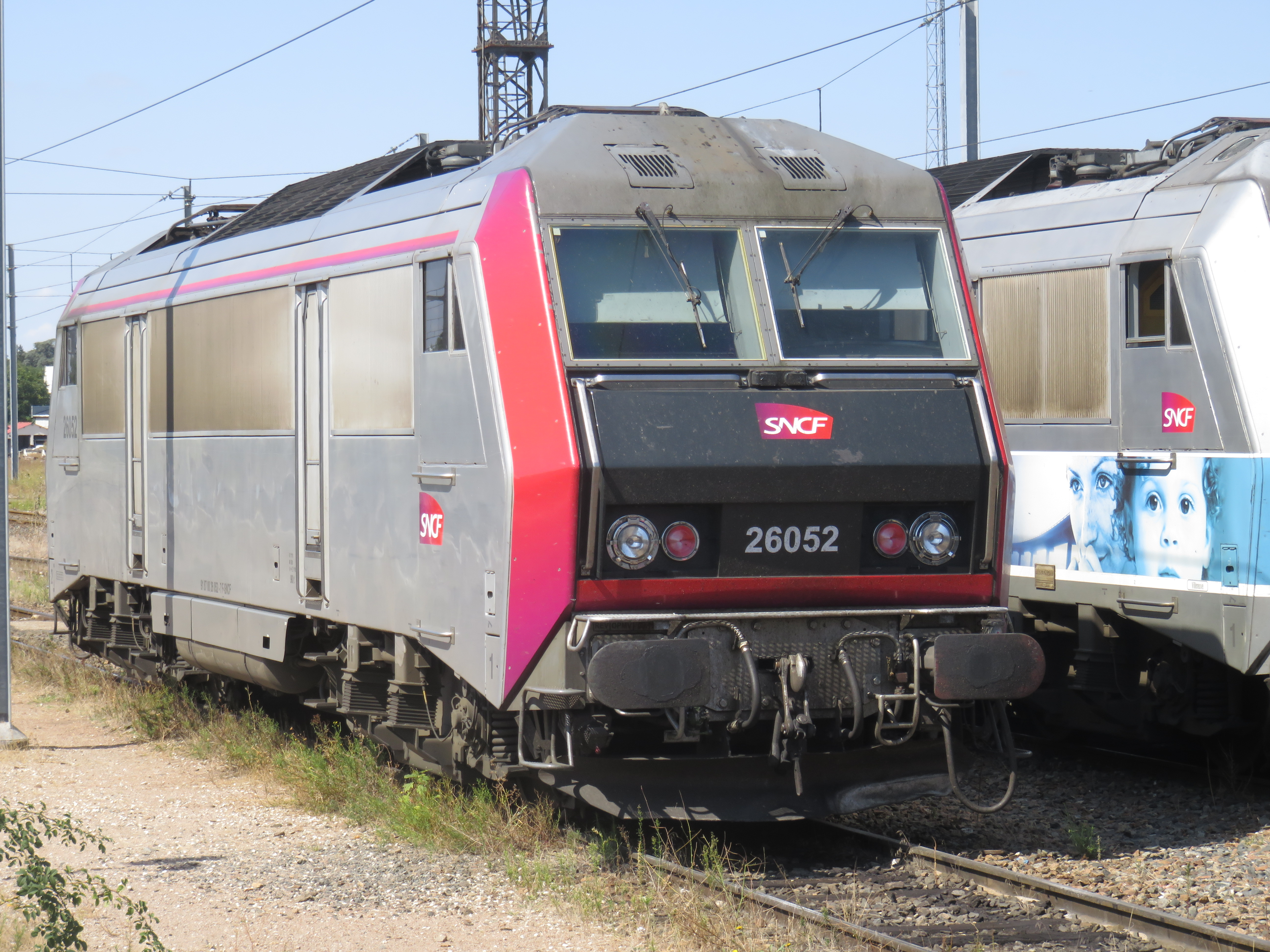
“Carmillon” livery on BB 26052 in Bourges.

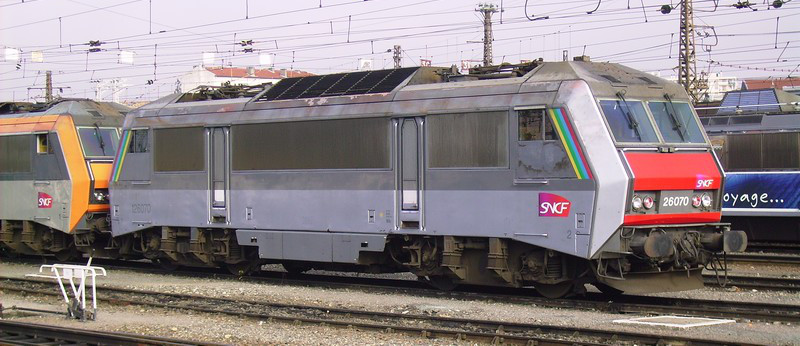
“TER 200 Alsace” livery on BB 26070 in Toulouse.

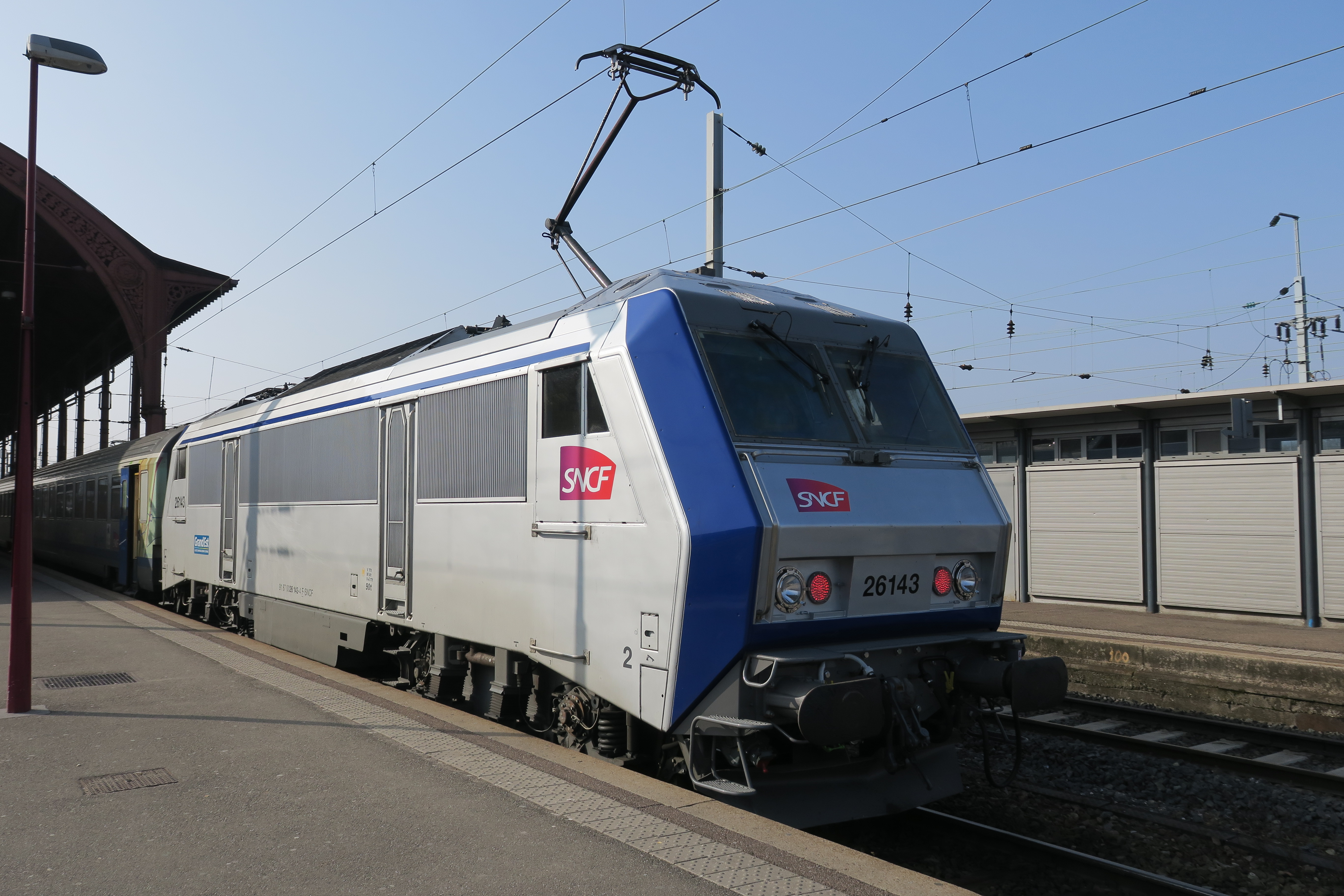
“TER Grand Est” livery on BB 26143.

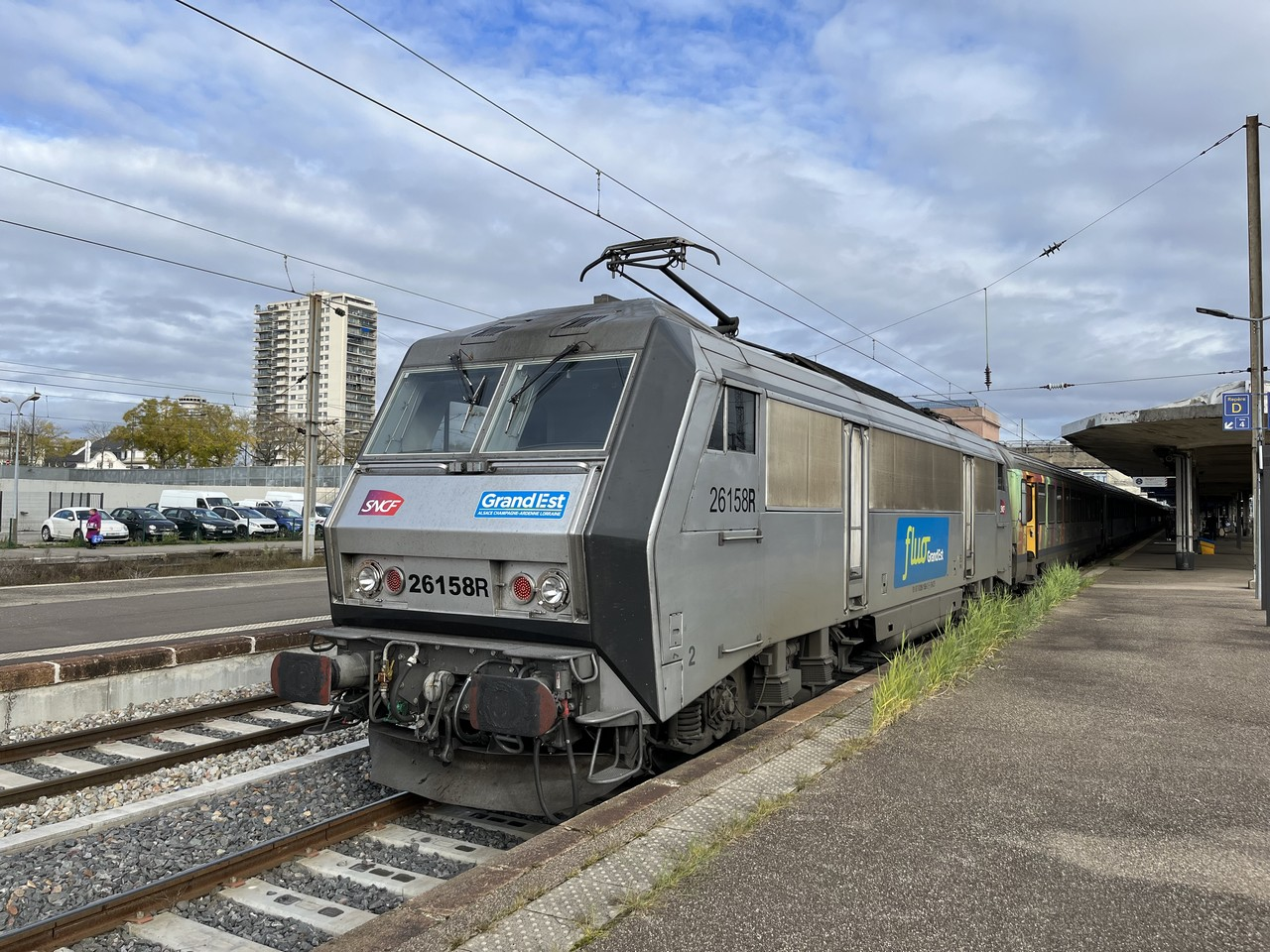
“TER Fluo Grand Est” livery on BB 26158.

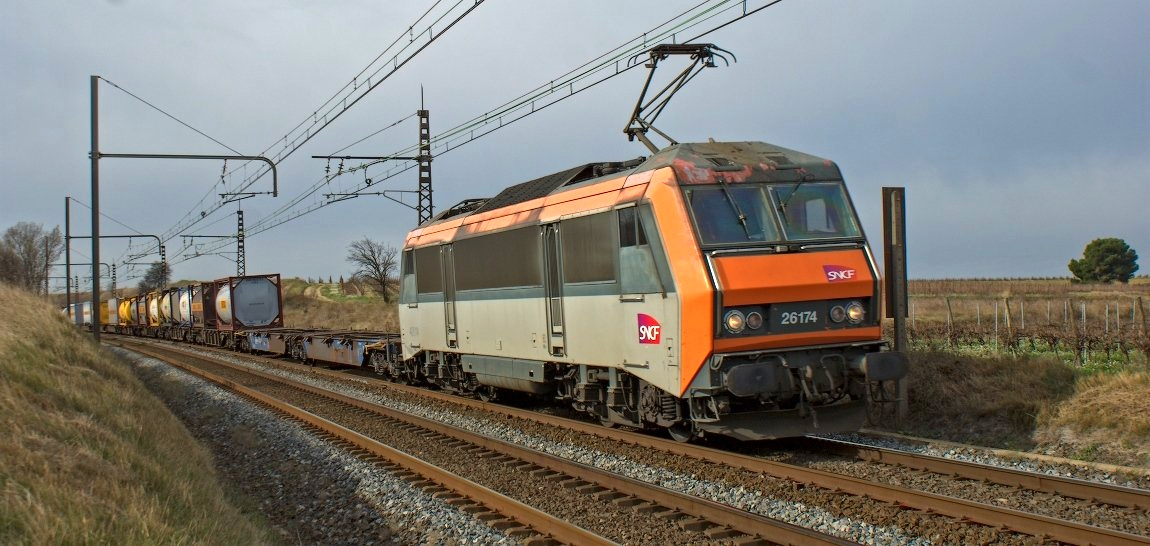
BB26174

== Miniature models ==
The locomotives have been reproduced as models in HO scale by Roco, Märklin, Jouef and Trix, and by PIKO in HO and N scales.
