= Pierrefitte =

Pierrefitte is the name of several communes in France:

- Pierrefitte, Corrèze
- Pierrefitte, Creuse
- Pierrefitte, Deux-Sèvres
- Pierrefitte, Vosges

It is also part of the name of several communes:

- Pierrefitte-en-Auge, in the Calvados département
- Pierrefitte-en-Beauvaisis, in the Oise département
- Pierrefitte-en-Cinglais, in the Calvados département
- Pierrefitte-ès-Bois, in the Loiret département
- Pierrefitte-Nestalas, in the Hautes-Pyrénées département
- Pierrefitte-sur-Aire, in the Meuse département
- Pierrefitte-sur-Loire, in the Allier département
- Pierrefitte-sur-Sauldre, in the Loir-et-Cher département
- Pierrefitte-sur-Seine, in the Seine-Saint-Denis département
  - Pierrefitte–Stains station
