= Charles Tellier =

French engineer

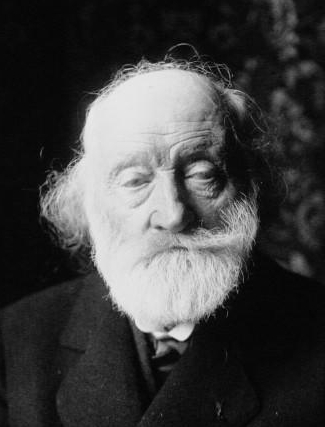
Charles Tellier in 1912

Charles Tellier (29 June 1828 – 19 October 1913) was a French engineer, born in Amiens. He early made a study of motors and compressed air. In 1868, he began experiments in refrigeration, which resulted ultimately in the refrigerating plant, as used on ocean vessels, to preserve meats and other perishable food. In 1911, Tellier was awarded the Joest prize by the French Institute and, in 1912, he was made Chevalier of the Legion of Honour. He wrote Histoire d'une invention moderne, le frigorifique (1910). Tellier died impoverished in Paris. Dimethyl ether was the first refrigerant, in 1876, Charles Tellier bought the ex-Elder-Dempster a 690 tons cargo ship Eboe and fitted a Methyl-ether refrigerating plant of his design. The ship was renamed Le Frigorifique and successfully imported a cargo of refrigerated meat from Argentina and Uruguay for the first time. However the machinery could be improved and in 1877 another refrigerated ship called Paraguay with a refrigerating plant improved by Ferdinand Carré was put into service on the South American run.

== See also ==
- Timeline of low-temperature technology
- Francisco Lecocq
