= 1992 Campeonato Uruguayo Primera División =

89th season of the top-tier football league in Uruguay

Statistics of Primera División Uruguaya for the 1992 season.

== Overview ==
It was contested by 13 teams, and Nacional won the championship.

== League standings ==
| Pos | Team | Pld | W | D | L | GF | GA | GD | Pts |
|---|---|---|---|---|---|---|---|---|---|
| 1 | Nacional | 24 | 14 | 5 | 5 | 46 | 26 | +20 | 33 |
| 2 | River Plate | 24 | 10 | 8 | 6 | 35 | 26 | +9 | 28 |
| 3 | Danubio | 24 | 8 | 11 | 5 | 23 | 18 | +5 | 27 |
| 4 | Peñarol | 24 | 10 | 6 | 8 | 32 | 25 | +7 | 26 |
| 5 | Bella Vista | 24 | 9 | 8 | 7 | 28 | 23 | +5 | 26 |
| 6 | Defensor Sporting | 24 | 9 | 8 | 7 | 26 | 22 | +4 | 26 |
| 7 | Montevideo Wanderers | 24 | 7 | 10 | 7 | 21 | 22 | −1 | 24 |
| 8 | Racing Montevideo | 24 | 4 | 16 | 4 | 17 | 18 | −1 | 24 |
| 9 | Progreso | 24 | 7 | 10 | 7 | 23 | 31 | −8 | 24 |
| 10 | Liverpool | 24 | 6 | 11 | 7 | 17 | 25 | −8 | 23 |
| 11 | Cerro | 24 | 4 | 11 | 9 | 20 | 27 | −7 | 19 |
| 12 | Rentistas | 24 | 6 | 6 | 12 | 24 | 33 | −9 | 18 |
| 13 | Central Español | 24 | 2 | 10 | 12 | 18 | 34 | −16 | 14 |

Source: rsssf.com
