= Francisco Lecocq =

Uruguayan entrepreneur and politician

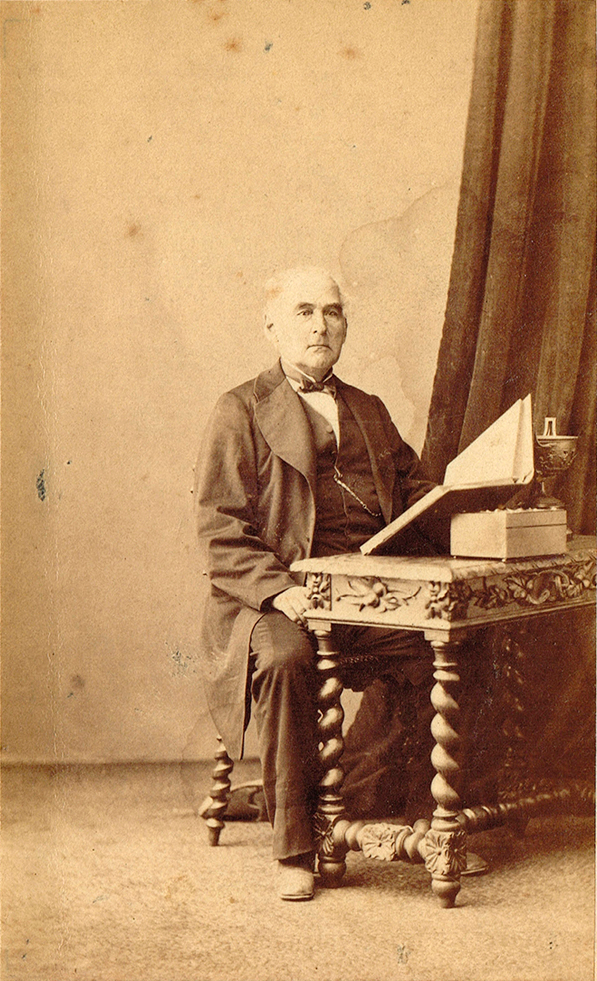
Francisco Lecocq

Francisco Lecocq (1790–1882) was a Uruguayan entrepreneur and politician.

== Biography ==
Educated in England, he acquired there a notable capacity for business. During his stay at the park near the Santa Lucía River, which today is named after him, he experimented with wine production and forestry. He imported special plants and animals; he also investigated the cultivation of silkworms, which was to become the first serious effort after that of Dámaso Antonio Larrañaga.

Along with Federico Nin Reyes and Charles Tellier, Lecocq is credited as being an inventor of a type of refrigerating plant for use on ocean vessels, to preserve meats and other perishable food. Lecocq was in charge of testing the first versions of the equipment. He carried out this experiment on board of The City of Rio de Janeiro, in 1868.

== Political career ==
Back in Uruguay, he played a key role during the Uruguayan Civil War. He was appointed Mayor of Montevideo from 1855 to 1856 by president Manuel Oribe. He was later appointed Minister of Finance by Gabriel Antonio Pereira. He also held a prominent place in the government after the Revolution of Las Lanzas in 1870.

In 1879 he became senator representing the San José Department, and he was also vice president and president of the Uruguayan Senate in 1880.

Lecocq was a member of the freemasonry and his father was Bernardo Lecocq (1734–1820), a Spanish brigadier who was appointed to the colonies in southern South America. His grandfather, Pedro Lecocq, was Flemish and his grandmother, Maria Osney, an immigrant Irishwoman.
