= Jairo O'Neil =

Uruguayan footballer (born 2001)

Personal information
- Full name: Jairo Sebastián O'Neil López
- Date of birth: 31 July 2001 (age 25)
- Place of birth: Paso de los Toros, Uruguay
- Height: 1.69 m (5 ft 7 in)
- Position: Left-back

Team information
- Current team: Boston River
- Number: 15

Youth career
- Peñarol

Senior career*
| Years | Team | Apps | (Gls) |
| 2022 | Peñarol | 4 | (0) |
| 2023 | Fénix | 11 | (0) |
| 2023 | Unión Santa Fe | 0 | (0) |
| 2024 | Argentinos Juniors | 0 | (0) |
| 2024 | Sud América | 6 | (0) |
| 2025– | Boston River | 14 | (0) |

International career
| 2023 | Uruguay U23 | 4 | (0) |
- * Club domestic league appearances and goals as of 09:23, 13 July 2025 (UTC)

Jairo Sebastián O'Neil López (born 31 July 2001) is a Uruguayan professional footballer who plays as a left-back for Uruguayan Primera División club Boston River.

== Early and personal life ==
Born in Paso de los Toros, Tacuarembó Department, O'Neil was a cousin of Uruguay international footballer Fabián O'Neill (1973–2022), who played in the Italian Serie A for Cagliari and Juventus. While his cousin began his career at Nacional, O'Neil came through at their Uruguayan Clásico rivals Peñarol, the club he supports.

The family surname came from Michael O'Neill, who emigrated from County Cork in Ireland to Uruguay in 1837.

== Club career ==
O'Neil signed a contract with Peñarol in December 2021, to last until the end of July. He was signed due to injuries to Juan Manuel Ramos and Valentín Rodríguez. Days later, he had his first involvement with the first team, remaining an un unused substitute in a 3–1 home win over Sud América on the final day of the Uruguayan Primera División season.

O'Neil made his debut on 21 May 2022, playing in a 1–0 home win over Boston River when Ramos was injured after 18 minutes. Four days later he played the full length of a 2–1 win over Colón of Argentina in the group stage of the Copa Libertadores, also at the Estadio Campeón del Siglo.

O'Neil's contract at Peñarol expired in July 2022 and he trained with Unión de Santa Fe in Argentina for six months without gaining a contract under compatriot manager Gustavo Munúa, eventually returning to his homeland's top flight with Fénix in February 2023. On 23 August that year he returned to Unión on a contract until the end of 2025, on a free transfer. He was not chosen by manager Kily González during an eventually successful fight against relegation, and missed several games due to involvement with the Uruguay under-23 team. In December 2023, he was released.

In January 2024, O'Neil remained in the Argentine Primera División, signing with Argentinos Juniors until the end of 2025. Halfway through the year he returned to his country on a free transfer, signing for Sud América in the Uruguayan Segunda División.

O'Neil moved to Boston River of the top flight in January 2025. On 19 February, he made his club debut in the Copa Libertadores as an added-time substitute for Fredy Martínez in a 1–0 home win over Ñublense of Chile in the first leg of the second round.

== International career ==
O'Neil was part of the Uruguay under-23 squad at the 2023 Pan American Games in Chile. In the fifth-place playoff against Colombia, he came on as a late substitute and scored the first attempt as his country won in a penalty shootout after a goalless draw.
