= Baggage handler =

Person who handles cargo at an airport

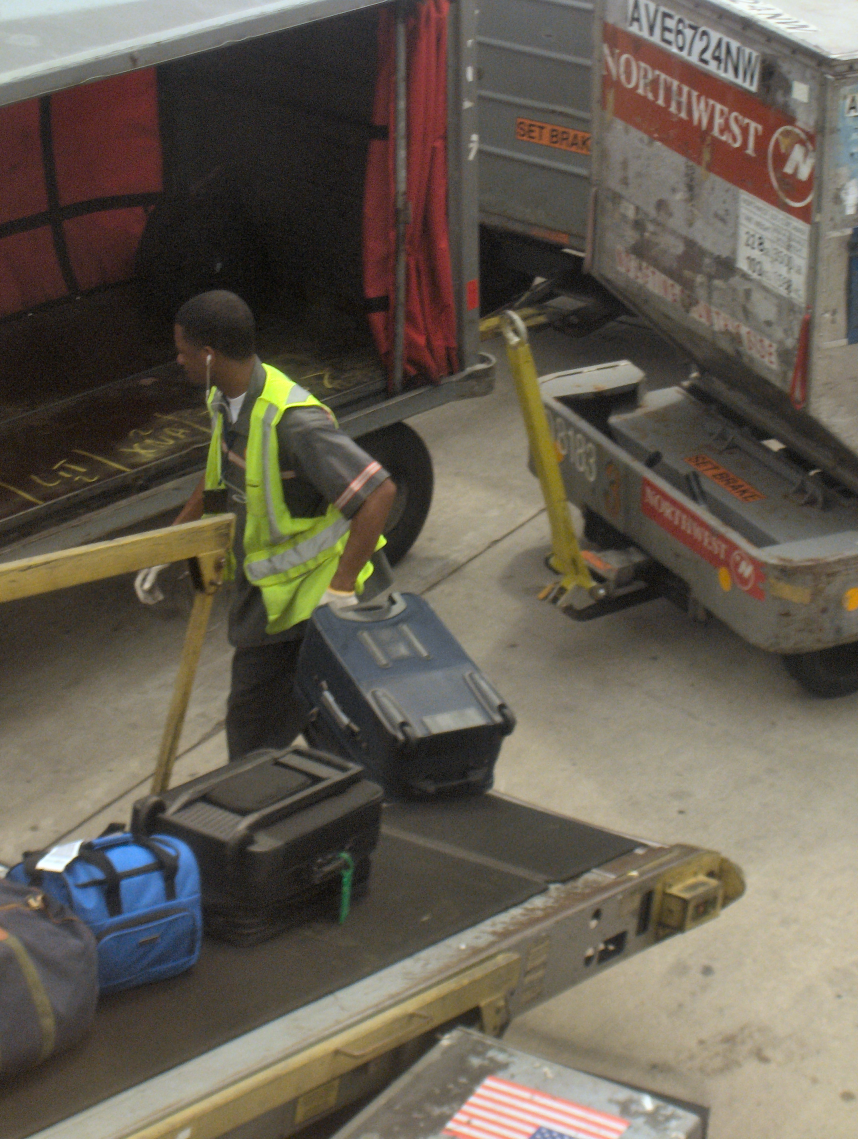
Baggage handler unloading baggage from a bag belt at Detroit Metropolitan Airport

In the airline industry, a baggage handler is a person who loads and unloads baggage (suitcases or luggage), and other cargo (airfreight, mail, counter-to-counter packages) for transport via aircraft. With most airlines, the formal job title is "fleet service agent/clerk", though the position is commonly known amongst airline employees as a ramp agent, due to the job's location on the airport ramp (tarmac), although that position may be separate than a baggage handler due to the proximity on the ramp.

== Industry ==
Within the airline industry, a baggage handler is often referred to as a "rampie" or "ramper": one who handles cargo on the "ramp" (the Aircraft Operations Area or AOA; outside the airline industry, the ramp is frequently referred to as the "tarmac", a term popularized by the media). Offensive terms for rampie/ramper include "ramp rat", "bag smasher", "bag jockey", "luggage monkey", and "thrower".

A baggage handler also works jobs which are out of view of the flying public, including the bag room, operations (or load control), and the air freight warehouse. Some of these jobs have union representation and due to this, baggage handlers can be very well compensated with an above average pay scale and good medical, retirement and benefits packages.

== Process ==
When baggage is checked in at the ticket counter or with a skycap (where it receives a bag tag indicating the passenger's itinerary), it is often placed onto a moving bag belt which carries the baggage to the bag room. This is where numerous checked bags are sorted so that they will be loaded onto the proper flight. The bag tag which was previously affixed to the baggage during check-in is then read by a baggage handler and placed into the proper bag cart (usually a 4-wheeled trailer) or Unit Load Device (ULD; a machine-loadable container). The bag cart or ULD is then eventually pulled from the bag room by a bag tug and out to the aircraft for loading by baggage handlers.

In addition to "pushing" an aircraft from the terminal gate (with a "push back" or "tow motor") to position it for engine start and eventual taxi, baggage handlers also may tow aircraft to and from another gate or to a "remote" or RON ("remain over night") parking area. There will be a mechanic in the flight deck 'riding the brakes', who communicates with ATC ground control (for movement clearance), and operates the APU ("auxiliary power unit"), brakes, lights; the agent will operate the tow-tractor. This applies only to the "Non-Movement Area" of the airport, the part of the airport ramp where ramp agents can operate. Ramp agents cannot operate within the Movement Area, reserved for aircraft and emergency equipment, which is controlled by the Air Traffic Control Tower. In some union-negotiated airlines or stations this job could also be done by the baggage handler.

== Various jobs of handlers ==
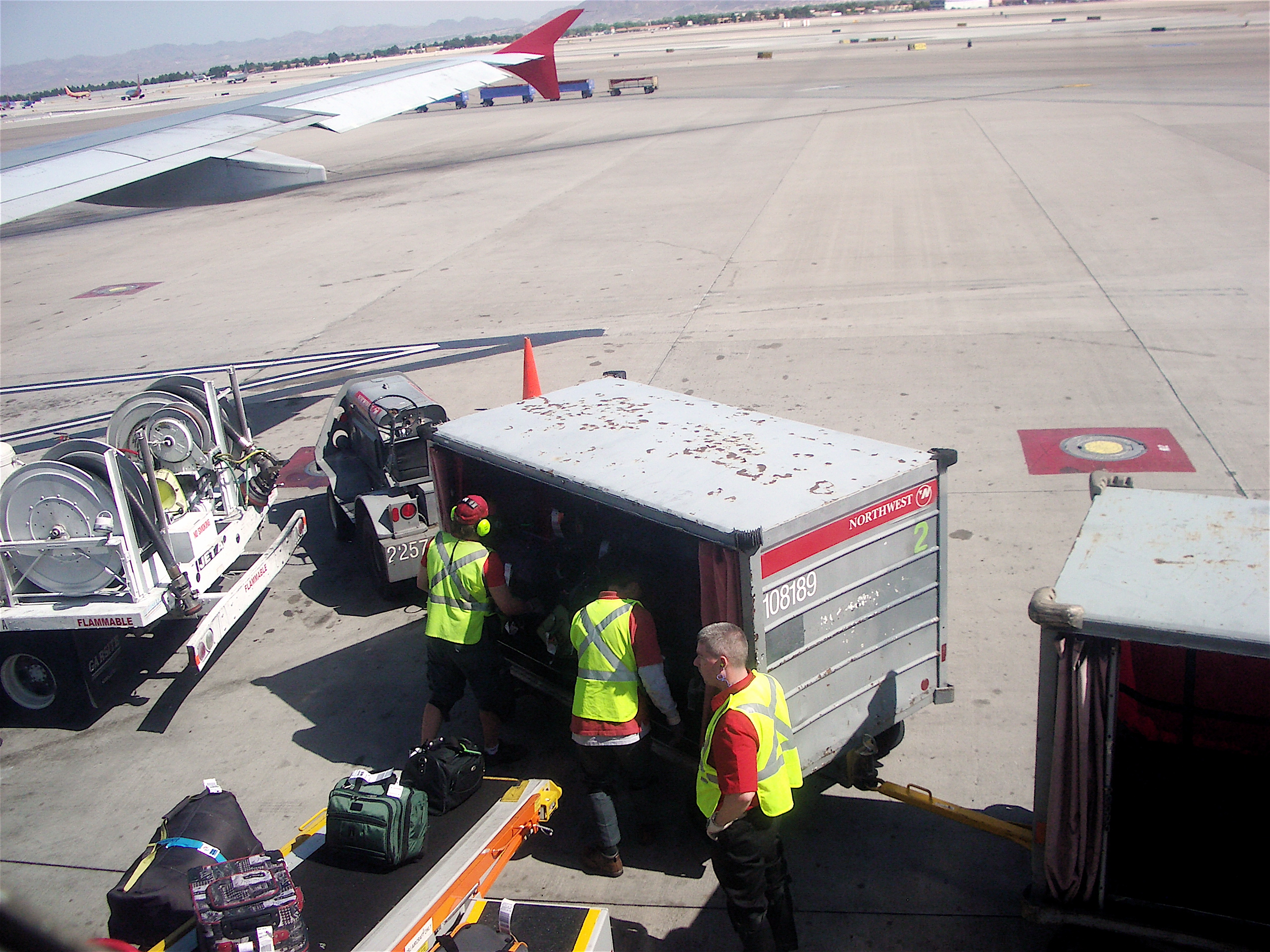
Baggage handlers loading a Northwest Airlines airplane at McCarran International Airport

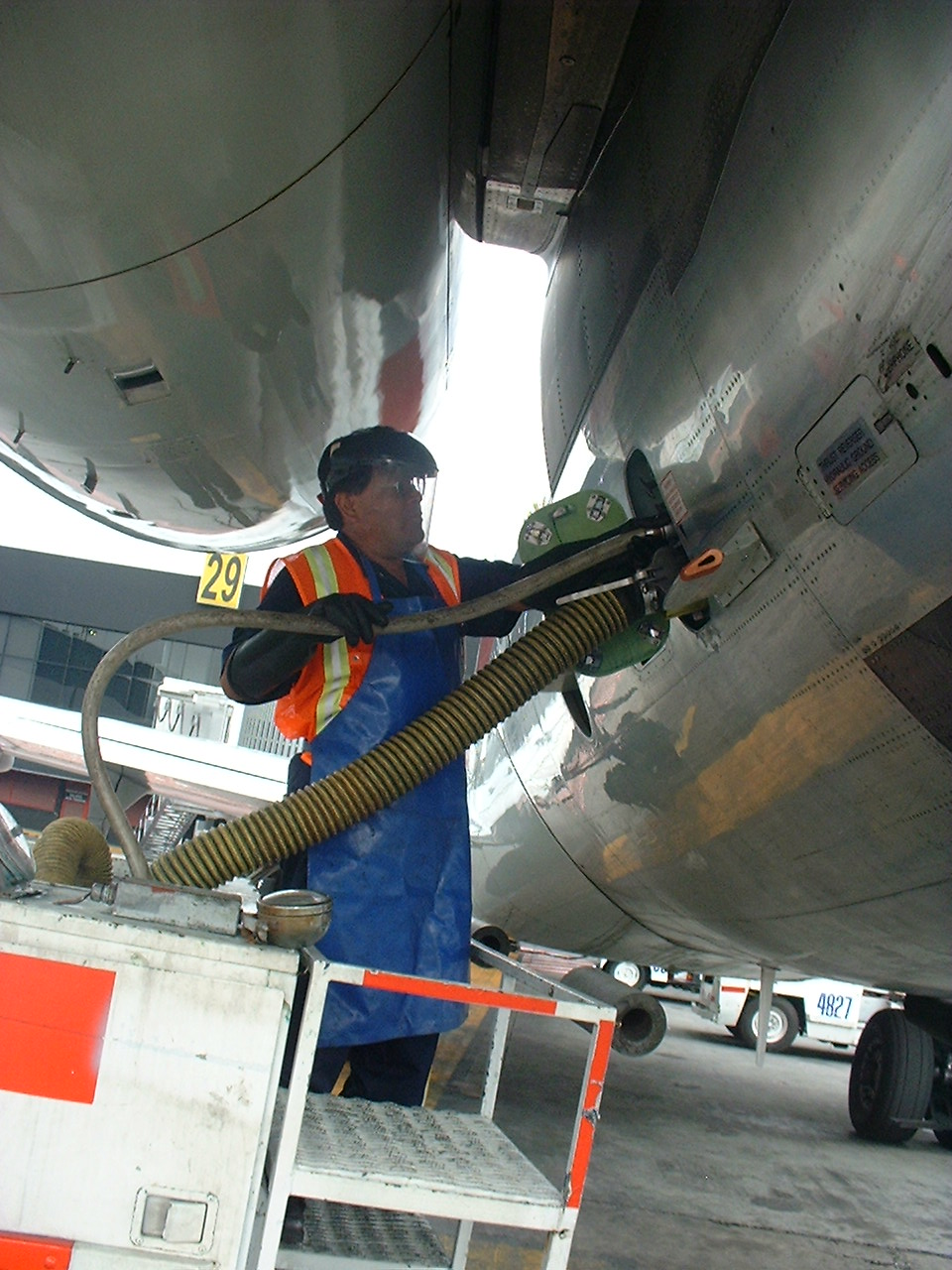
A handler doing lavatory service

=== Operations (load control) agent ===
An aircraft has weight and balance limitations in order to ensure safe operation. There is a limit to how much a loaded aircraft can weigh; in addition, the cargo, passenger and fuel load must be distributed so that the aircraft is "in balance"—in other words, not too nose-heavy or tail-heavy. One of the jobs of the operations agent is to ensure that the aircraft—as finally loaded—is "legal" (within safe limits) before the aircraft departs the gate. Upon satisfaction of this mandated requirement, that data is used to generate information which the pilot requires in order to ensure the safe operation of the aircraft.

=== Warehouse agent ===
The air freight warehouse is where inbound and outbound air freight is processed. It is usually located on or adjacent to airport property and is usually separate from the passenger terminal. This is a secure (sterile) area where only authorized persons are allowed access. If inbound international shipments are involved and have not been cleared by customs, those shipments (and the warehouse) may be "in bond", which requires additional security clearance/authorization of employees.

=== Crew chief ===
Also known as the load master, the crew chief is responsible for many different job functions; usually a team of rampers who report directly to him or her. Crew chiefs are responsible for ensuring that an aircraft has been loaded to the specifications of the load agent, and reporting any discrepancies to management. Usually this job has a premium rate of pay for the extra responsibilities.

=== Ramp agent ===
The people working on the ramp, typically seen loading bags, are referred to as "ramp agents". Among other duties, they must ensure that arriving aircraft are unloaded promptly. The ramp agents will also load departing aircraft. They must sometimes account for the baggage loaded into each compartment to ensure proper weight and balance, although this job is often the responsibility of flight operations staff.

=== Transfer agent ===
This term is loosely used to refer to any agent who operates a vehicle that is used to transfer bags from one aircraft to another or to carry bags from the "bag room" to the correct aircraft. Another common term for this position is "runner". At the airline's hub locations, the agent responsible for meeting aircraft and transferring baggage directly from an inbound aircraft to the correct outbound aircraft is termed a "connections runner", often shortened to "connects" and abbreviated as "conx".

=== Inbound runner ===
The agent in charge of delivering bags from an inbound aircraft to the baggage claim carousel.

=== Lavatory agent ===
Delta lavatory agent at Bradley International Airport

The lavatory or "lav" agent is responsible for removing waste matter from the lavatories of incoming aircraft, by flushing the lavatory system. Surprisingly, the lesser physical demands of this position put it in equal or higher demand with other positions. In stations with higher volumes of passenger traffic, lavatory agents will usually use trucks adapted with large tanks on board that do not need to be emptied as often. These are also configured to facilitate access to the waste ports of the aircraft, which can be out of reach by other means. In places where fewer or smaller aircraft are being serviced, a "lav cart" (essentially a small lav truck pulled behind a tug) is used to service the lavatories.

=== Mail/freight agent ===
As mail and freight arrives at a destination to either terminate at that location or continue on to another destination, certified agents handle and deliver it. They are responsible for scanning each package and delivering it to its proper aircraft.

=== Bag room agent ===
As baggage is delivered into the bag room via conveyor belt it is the Bag Room agent's job to sort bags into carts according to routing. (i.e. if the individual who owns the bag has their final destination at the aircraft's destination or if they are transferring to a different flight). It is also the bag room agent's responsibility to sort the bags belonging to persons flying on standby or in first class.

=== Station agent ===
Station agents are cross-trained to work both as a baggage handler, and also work in positions involving customer service. Typically, station agents are used at smaller airports that do not handle as many flights as major airports. For example, an airline that has a smaller operation at Raleigh–Durham International Airport might have its employees check in passengers, then have the same employees load, and push the aircraft.

== Notable persons ==
- Bill Boyer Jr. – a baggage handler for Alaska Airlines who invented the digEplayer in-flight entertainment device and now owns Mokulele Airlines
- Alberto Dominguez – Uruguayan-Australian Olympic cyclist who worked as a baggage handler for Qantas. He was killed in the September 11 attacks aboard American Airlines Flight 11.
- Aggie Kukulowicz – former NHL player and later Air Canada executive in Moscow
- John Smeaton – a Scottish baggage handler at Glasgow Airport who became involved in thwarting the 2007 Glasgow Airport attack

== Hazards ==
Ramp agent in the tight quarters of a B-737 cargo compartment

Every checked bag loaded onto a narrow body aircraft (e.g. Boeing 737, CRJ 700) or the bulk section of some wide-body aircraft must be loaded into airplane cargo compartments by hand at the flight's origin and unloaded by hand at the flight's destination. Some cargo doors are 15 to 20 feet (4.6 to 6.1 m) above the ground and can only be accessed by walking up a mobile conveyor belt. Falling from an elevated position onto a concrete tarmac has led to severe injuries and at least one known death.

As of 2022 the average weight of checked luggage is 35 pounds (16 kg) each, although some airlines allow passenger to check heavier luggage for a fee. Manual lifting and handling of these bags in awkward and restricted postures in small cargo compartments under time pressure imposed by strict airline schedules has been identified as a risk factor for work-related musculoskeletal disorders (WMSDs) among baggage handlers.

Ramp agents at Bradley International Airport preparing to marshal an aircraft into the gate during the January 2019 North American winter storm

Ramp agents are frequently at risk of hearing impairment from constant exposure to elevated sound levels from an aircraft's engines or its APU, and hearing tests are usually required upon employment. Ramp agents are also often exposed to hazardous weather conditions, including dust storms, lightning, and extreme heat or freezing conditions.

In the United States, the Federal Aviation Administration requires an airline or its subsidiary to provide mandatory annual training to their ramp agents on safety and proper ways to work in an airport environment.

== Examples of accidents ==
- Ramp agent killed at Dulles International Airport after colliding with a mobile lounge used to transport passengers
- Ramp agent killed after losing control of tug at LAX
- United Airlines Ramp agent falls off a loader and dies
- Baggage handler at Pearson Airport dies when luggage cart rolls over

== See also ==
- Baggage cart
- Ground support equipment
- Line technician (aviation)
- Loadmaster
