= Line technician =

Line technician may refer to:

- Line technician (automotive) or heavy line technician, a reference to driveline technician
- Line technician (aviation), commonly known as a line tech, line guy, gas jockey or ramp rat
