= Non-revenue =

Non-revenue, meaning not pertaining to revenue, may refer to:

- Standby (air travel), also known as non-revenue air travel
- Non-revenue water, measured leakage of a water supply
- Non-revenue track, railway tracks not used by trains in regular service
- Non-revenue cars, railway vehicles that do not derive income for the railroad

== See also ==
- Non-profit
- Non-commercial
