= Emigration from Uruguay =

Number of Uruguayans (including descendants) per country. Uruguay + 100,000 + 10,000 + 1,000

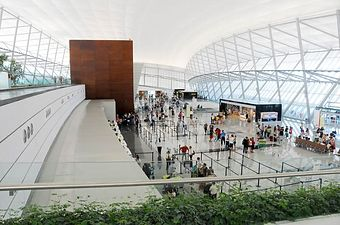
Departure terminal of Carrasco International Airport, one of the main departure points of Uruguayan emigrants.

Emigration from Uruguay is a migratory phenomenon that has been taking place in Uruguay since the early 20th century.

== Overview ==
Emigration from Uruguay began tentatively about a century ago, but experienced a significant increase since the 1960s. Successive economic crises (notably in 1982 and 2002), plus the small size of the country's economy and population, were decisive factors that pushed thousands of Uruguayans out of their country of birth; economic migrants traveled primarily to other Spanish-speaking countries with bigger economies. As Uruguay has a relatively well-developed educational system and free access to the University of the Republic, many Uruguayan professional graduates and scholars found their country too small to achieve their own goals, which resulted in a brain drain. The 12-year-long military dictatorship that ruled from 1973 to 1985 also forced many Uruguayans to go into exile due to ideological differences and political persecution, in the context of the Cold War.

== Destinations ==
The main receptors of Uruguayan emigration are: Argentina, Brazil, the United States, Canada, Australia; in Europe: Spain (over 40,000 as of 2011), Italy, France, and Portugal. During the military dictatorship, some exiled Uruguayans migrated to Mexico, Venezuela, Sweden, Germany, etc. Further, a significant number of Uruguayan Jews (almost 10,000) emigrated to Israel between 1950 and 2000 as part of the Aliyah.

Recent estimates put the emigration figures at over 500,000.

== Articulation ==
At the beginning of the 21st century, Departamento 20 ("Twentieth Department", in allusion to the 19 Departments into which the Uruguayan territory is divided) was created, an instance of coordination and articulation for Uruguayans living abroad.

The Consultative Councils (Spanish: Consejos Consultivos) are representative organizations of Uruguayans living abroad whose central role is linking them with the country in several forms; they were established by Law No. 18250 of January 2008. They can be found in Argentina, Australia, Brazil, Canada, Chile, France, Greece, Italy, Mexico, Paraguay, Spain, Sweden, USA, and Venezuela.

As of November 2013, the Uruguayan government plans to implement a project to link qualified Uruguayan émigrés with technological sectors in Uruguay, especially in biotechnology, information technology and renewable energies.

== Notable Uruguayan emigrants ==
Many talented Uruguayans have succeeded on the international stage:

Past

- Carlos Aragone (Montevideo, 1937 – Caracas, 1994), physicist
- Alberto Domínguez (born in Montevideo, 1934–2001), cyclist and radio presenter, victim of the September 11 attacks
- Elio García-Austt (Montevideo, 1919 - 2005), physician and neuroscientist, active in Chile and Spain
- Ángel Rama (Montevideo, 1926 – Madrid, 1983), writer, academic, literary critic, known for his theorization of the concept of transculturation
- Emir Rodríguez Monegal (Melo, 1921 – New Haven, 1985), was a scholar, literary critic, and professor of Latin American contemporary literature at Yale University
- Jules Supervielle (Montevideo, 1884 – Paris 1960) Franco-Uruguayan writer
- Rafael Viñoly (Montevideo, 1944 - New York, 2023), architect established in the United States, author of the Tokyo International Forum (1996)
- China Zorrilla (Montevideo, 1922 – 2014), theater, film, and television actress, active in Argentina

Present

- Jorge Drexler (born 1964 in Montevideo), musician, 2004 Best Song Academy Award for Al otro lado del río
- Fernando Espuelas (born 1967 in Montevideo), American entrepreneur
- José Holebas (born 1984 in Aschaffenburg), Greek international footballer of Uruguayan descent through his mother
- Osvaldo Laport (born 1956 in Juan Lacaze), television actor, active in Argentina
- Elli Medeiros (born 1956 in Montevideo) is a Uruguayan-French singer and actress
- Natalia Oreiro (born 1977 in Montevideo), film and telenovela actress and singer, active in Argentina
- Carlos Ott (born 1946 in Montevideo), architect established in Canada, author of the Opéra Bastille, Paris (1989)
- Carlos Perciavalle (born 1941 in Montevideo), theater actor, comedian, and screenwriter

== See also ==
- Demographics of Uruguay
- Foreign relations of Uruguay
- Immigration to Uruguay
- Uruguayan people
