= Airhitch =

System for hitchhiking on commercial airliners

- Type: Non-commercial organization
- Industry: Air travel
- Founded: 1969
- Defunct: 2009
- Headquarters: Cyberspace
- Key people: Robert Segelbaum, Founder

Airhitch was a user-run system for hitchhiking on commercial airliners. It was started by Robert Segelbaum in 1969. People who traveled in this way generally referred to themselves as Airhitchers. Most airhitchers flew between the United States and Western Europe. Before Airhitch migrated to internet-based communication in the 1990s, it operated out of North American offices including New York, Los Angeles (Santa Monica), San Francisco, Seattle, Montreal, and Vancouver, and numerous European cities including Paris, Amsterdam, Berlin, Bonn, and Rome. Airhitch was a non-commercial system/method/process. After migrating online, virtually, all exchange of Airhitch information took place in an AIM chat room. In the chat room, Airhitchers used their real names while the staff used screen names such as Airhitch01, and Airhitch08.

After 2006, the cost and availability of "Airhitchable" flights was questionable. Before the website (airhitch.org) and business went defunct in 2009, the majority of "AHers" opted to help each other find conventional airfare to their destinations.

== The Airhitching process ==
- Registration: Airhitchers formally committed to participation in the Airhitch system by sending an online registration to the staff.
- Flight-Briefing: With the guidance of the staff, Airhitchers explored the best possibilities for catching rides on flights and the procedural mechanics of how to take advantage of them.
- Decision: Airhitchers decided which flight they would attempt to board.
- Boarding: Airhitchers went to the airport and attempted to board the aircraft.

== Controversy ==
Around the year 2000, there were two websites with very similar names claiming the name Air Hitch, and both denied any affiliation with the other. At the time, the system used prepaid vouchers. Due to the similar websites and general nature of online reviews, it was not clear which website was part of the legitimate airhitch system.

Some online user reviews talked of invalid vouchers and scam tactics. Including invalid mailing address for the returns office and refund policies designed with procedures and time frames just long enough to prevent credit card payment chargebacks; as well as falsely advertising frequent flights from certain large regions where no airline was actually accepting the vouchers, leading to a costly round of ground transit from region to region chasing phantom flights followed by the refund policies previously mentioned.

== See also ==
- Hitchhiking
- Standby (air travel)
