= NRSA =

NRSA may refer to:

- National Remote Sensing agency (formerly the National Remote Sensing centre): A central organization of the government of India responsible for managing data from imaging satellites.
- National Research Service Award: A family of grants provided by the National Institutes of Health for training in behavioral and health research.
- Nafcillin-resistant Staphylococcus aureus (see NRSA)
- Non Revenue Space Available: Standby travel for airline personnel and their dependents (see Nonrev).
