= Uruguayans in Sweden =

Uruguayans in Sweden Sverige födda i Uruguay
Suecos uruguayos

Total population
- 4,000 estimated

Regions with significant populations
- Stockholm, Gothenburg, Malmö

Languages
- Spanish language, Swedish language

Religion
- Predominantly Roman Catholicism

Uruguayans in Sweden are people born in Uruguay who live in Sweden, or Swedish-born people of Uruguayan descent. As of 2013, there were over 4,000 Uruguayans living in Swedish territory.

== Overview ==
Since Sweden was and remains a highly democratic country and a net receiver of immigrants, during the civic-military dictatorship of Uruguay (1973–1985) there were several Uruguayans fled to Sweden; this was possible, among others, much because of Ambassador Harald Edelstam. Nowadays there are many Uruguayans who still live in Sweden.

Uruguayan residents in Sweden have their own institutions, for instance, Casa Uruguay in Malmö and the Consultative Councils in Stockholm and Gothenburg.

== Notable people ==
past

- Dahd Sfeir (1932–2015), actress

present

- Hebert Abimorad (born 1946 in Montevideo), poet, translator and journalist
- Henry Engler (born 1946 in Paysandú), neuroscientist, former Tupamaro
- Roberto Mascaró (born 1948 in Montevideo), poet and translator
- Ana Luisa Valdés (born 1953 in Montevideo), anthropologist and translator
- Martin Lopez (born 1978 in Stockholm), drummer
- Banesa Martinez Roldán (born 1982 in Uruguay), politician
- Martin Mendez (born 1978 in Montevideo), bass guitar player
- Guillermo Molins (born 1988 in Montevideo), footballer
- Sofía Rito (born 1985 in Stockholm), weightlifter
- Sebastian Senatore (born 1985 in Montevideo), footballer

== See also ==
- Sweden–Uruguay relations
- Immigration to Sweden
- Emigration from Uruguay
