= Uruguayans in Venezuela =

Uruguayan Venezuelans are people born in Uruguay who live in Venezuela, or Venezuelan-born people of Uruguayan descent. Modern estimates put the figure of Uruguayans in Venezuela at ca. 9,000.

== Overview ==
Many Uruguayan-born persons live in Venezuela, for a number of reasons. Both countries share the Spanish language; the historical origins of both nations are common (part of the Spanish Empire until the early 19th century); Venezuela has a bigger economy, which attracted Uruguayans in search of opportunities; and, from the political point of view, during the civic-military dictatorship of Uruguay (1973-1985), Venezuela remained democratic, so some Uruguayans went into exile in Venezuela. However, in recent years of Chavismo, some have returned to Uruguay.

Uruguayan residents in Venezuela have their own institutions, for instance, the Uruguayan-Venezuelan Center and the Consultative Council in Caracas.

== Notable people ==
- Carlos Aragone, physicist
- Rodrigo Arocena, mathematician
- Arturo Ardao, historian of ideas
- Ariel Britos, musician and conductor
- Ariel Fedullo, comedian
- Daniel Francovig, football player and coach
- Rodolfo Gambinir, physicist
- Damián Genovese, telenovela actor and model
- Beatriz Lockhart, composer
- Carlos Maldonado, football player and coach
- Hugo Márquez, actor
- Walter Martinez, journalist
- Antonio Mastrogiovanni, composer
- Norberto Mazza, Journalist, host of Grado 33 of Globovisión
- Gabriel Miranda, football player and coach
- Joseph Novoa, filmmaker
- Gustavo Núñez, musician
- Nicolás Pereira, tennis player
- Vícto Pignanelli, football player and coach
- Vanessa Pose, telenovela actress
- Angel Rama, writer
- Walter Roque, football player and coach
- Ariel Severino, scenographer
- Ugo Ulive, actor, director and scenographer

== See also ==
- Uruguay–Venezuela relations
- Venezuelans in Uruguay
- Emigration from Uruguay
