= Elena Quinteros =

Uruguayan anarchist and teacher

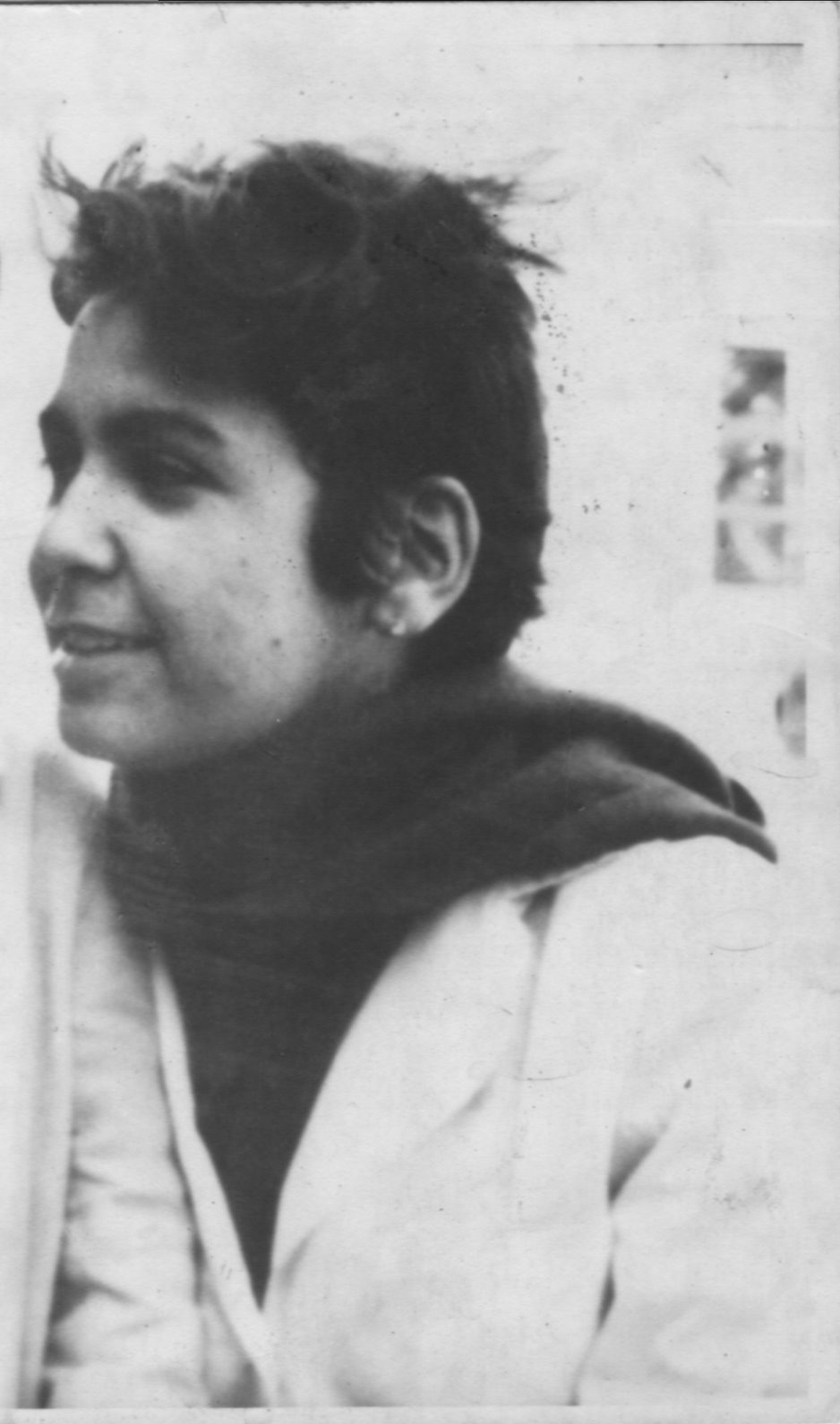
- Born: September 9, 1945
- Died: 1976
- Occupation: School teacher

Elena Quinteros (September 9, 1945, in Montevideo – missing from 1976) was a Uruguayan anarchist and school teacher. Quinteros was last seen in the 300 Carlos detention center during the civic-military dictatorship of Uruguay. She tried to escape asking for help in the Venezuelan embassy, but she was taken by force near the entrance. A few days later, she was tortured and killed. Because of this, Venezuela broke off diplomatic relations with Uruguay until democracy was restored in 1985. There was an investigation in the mid-2000s into the disappearance of Quinteros and others.

The School Nº 181 changed its name to Elena Quinteros School.

== See also ==
- Uruguay–Venezuela relations
