= Uruguayans in Spain =

Total population
- 80,000 (2022) (Note: As of 2018, 40,000 was the size of the population in Spain born in Uruguay (including those with Spanish citizenship), and 25,521 was the size of the foreign population (thus, with no Spanish citizenship) in Spain with Uruguayan citizenship.)

Uruguayans in Spain are people born in Uruguay who emigrated to Spain. As of 2022, there are over 80,000 Uruguayans living in Spain, mostly in Catalonia.

== Overview ==
Uruguay was part of the Spanish Empire, and since gaining independence, both countries have cultivated strong cultural and economic ties. Throughout the 19th and 20th centuries, large waves of Spanish immigrants, primarily from the regions of Galicia and the Basque Country, settled in Uruguay, shaping its culture, society, and demographics.

Since the 1960s, Spain has been one of the main destinations for Uruguayan emigrants who left the country due to various events, such as the civic-military dictatorship (1973-1985) and the banking crisis of 2002. In the early 21st century, a significant wave of Uruguayans established residence in Spain, often facilitated by access to Spanish citizenship, since a large portion of Uruguay's population is composed of first- or second-generation descendants of Spanish immigrants who arrived in Uruguay in the 20th century.

As of 2022, around 80,000 Uruguayans reside in Spain. The main regions of settlement are Catalonia, the Valencian Community, and Galicia. Expatriate Uruguayans have their own associations in Spain, notably the Uruguayan Center of Madrid and several Consultative Councils. Official information consider that there are at least 50 Uruguayan-run organizations in Spain.

== Notable people ==
Past

- Mario Benedetti (1920-2009), poet and writer, 2005 Menéndez Pelayo International Prize
- Elio García-Austt (1919-2005), neuroscientist
- Eduardo Galeano (1940-2015), writer, 2006 Global Exchange International Human Rights Award
- Antonio Larreta (1922-2015), actor, writer, film and theatre critic, 1992 Goya Award for Best Adapted Screenplay
- Juan Carlos Onetti (1909-1994), writer, Premio Cervantes 1980
- Isabel Pisano (1944-2025), journalist and war correspondent
- Alfredo Zitarrosa (1936-1984), singer-songwriter

Present

- Jorge Drexler, musician, 2005 Academy Award for Best Original Song
- Narciso Ibáñez Serrador, theater director and screenwriter
- Jordi César López Delgado, footballer
- Diego Meijide, footballer
- Cristina Peri Rossi, writer and translator, Premio Cervantes 2021
- Carmen Posadas, writer

== See also ==
- Emigration from Uruguay
- Spain–Uruguay relations
- Spanish Uruguayan
