= Spain–Uruguay relations =

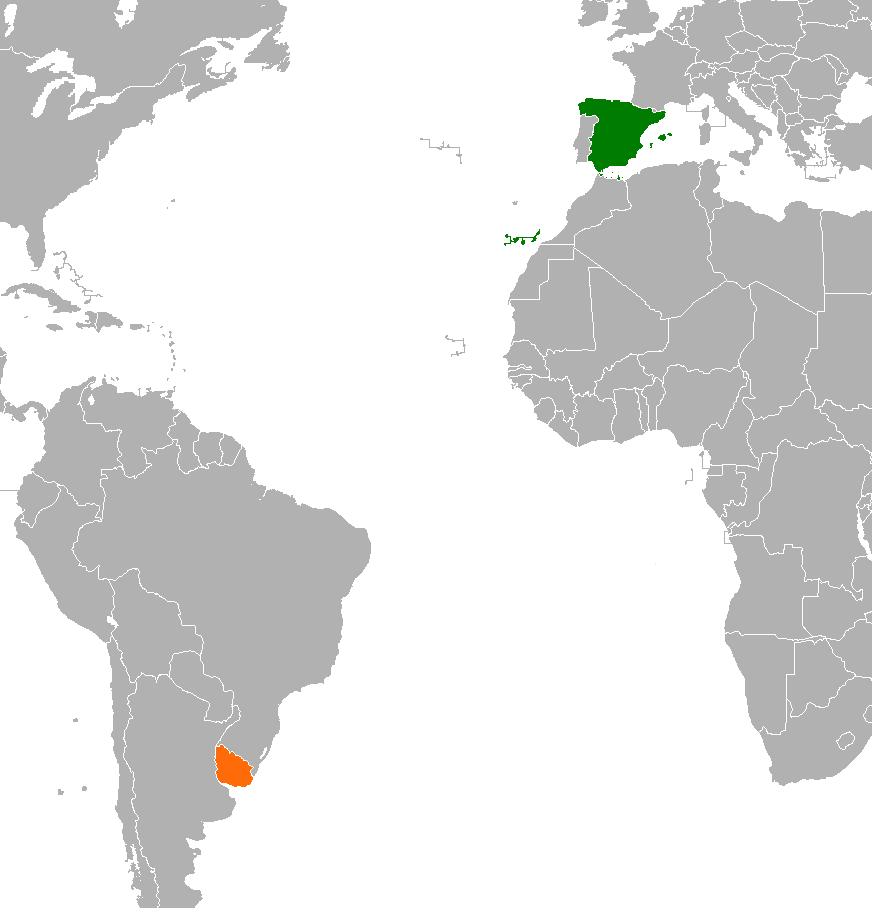
- Spain: Uruguay

Diplomatic mission
- Embassy of Spain, Montevideo: Embassy of Uruguay, Madrid

Spain and Uruguay have maintained current and historical relations. There is community of 67,000 Spanish nationals residing in Uruguay and 33,000 Uruguayan nationals residing in Spain. Both nations are members of the Association of Spanish Language Academies, Organization of Ibero-American States and the United Nations.

== History ==
=== Spanish colonization ===
In 1516, the first European to arrive to present-day Uruguay was Spanish explorer Juan Díaz de Solís. In 1526, explorer Sebastian Cabot named the land "Banda Oriental del Uruguay", however, he did not establish any settlements in the land as he believed it to be unattractive for settlement. In the 1620s, Jesuit and Franciscan missionaries established the first missions in Banda Oriental. By the late 1600s, Spanish settlers came to Banda Oriental for cattle raising. In 1776, Banda Oriental officially became part of the Spanish Empire and was governed from the Viceroyalty of the Río de la Plata based in Buenos Aires.

=== Independence ===
In 1810, a movement for independence broke out in Buenos Aires and it influenced the move for independence in Banda Oriental. In 1811, General José Gervasio Artigas led the independence movement in Banda Oriental and raised an army and fought against Spanish troops in the territory. In May 1811, General Artigas fought a successful battle against Spanish troops known as the Battle of Las Piedras. General Artigas was later seen as a threat by commanders in Buenos Aires who saw the Banda Oriental as a province of Rio de la Plata and not as a separate territory. In 1820, the commanders of Buenos Aires acquiesced when Portuguese Brazilian forces took over the Banda Oriental and forced Artigas into exile.

In 1825, the Thirty-Three Orientals entered into Uruguay and fought against Brazilian troops. In 1828 a treaty was signed between Brazil and Argentina which allowed for the Banda Oriental to become an independent nation. The new country was then to become known as Uruguay.

=== Post independence ===
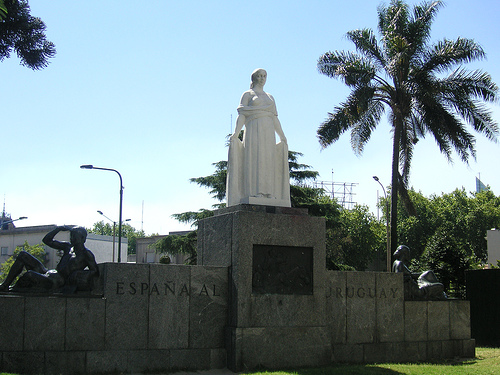
Monument to Spain in Montevideo

On 19 July 1870, both Spain and Uruguay established diplomatic relations and signed a Treaty of Peace and Friendship. After the establishment of diplomatic relations, thousands of Spanish nationals immigrated to Uruguay. In 1908, over 30% of Uruguays population were born in Spain.

On September 22, 1936, the Uruguayan government severed diplomatic relations with Spain, withdrawing its representatives and closing its legations. The decision followed the killing of two Uruguayan citizens, Dolores and Consuelo Aguiar-Mella, by Republican militias. The victims, lay associates of a congregation of nuns, were sisters of Teófilo Aguiar-Mella, Uruguay’s honorary vice-consul. Their bodies were identified by armbands bearing Uruguay’s national colors.

During the Spanish Civil War (1936–1939) approximately 70 Uruguayans fought in the international brigade against the Nationalist faction. In 1936, Uruguayan President Gabriel Terra recognized the government of Francisco Franco. Between the years of 1946 - 1958, over 37,000 Spanish citizens immigrated to Uruguay. Most Spanish migrants came to Uruguay escaping poverty in Spain. Some of them were also political refugees fleeing from Franco's dictatorship.

In May 1983, Spanish King Juan Carlos I paid an official visit to Uruguay. During his visit, the King met with the leaders of the Civic-military dictatorship of Uruguay to discuss a possible transition to democracy in the country. The King would return to Uruguay in November 1996 and once more in November 2006 to attend the 16th Ibero-American Summit being held in Montevideo.

In April 2026, Uruguayan President Yamandú Orsi travelled to Barcelona to attend the Defense in Democracy summit. At the summit, President Orsi met with Spanish Prime Minister Pedro Sánchez.

== High-level visits ==
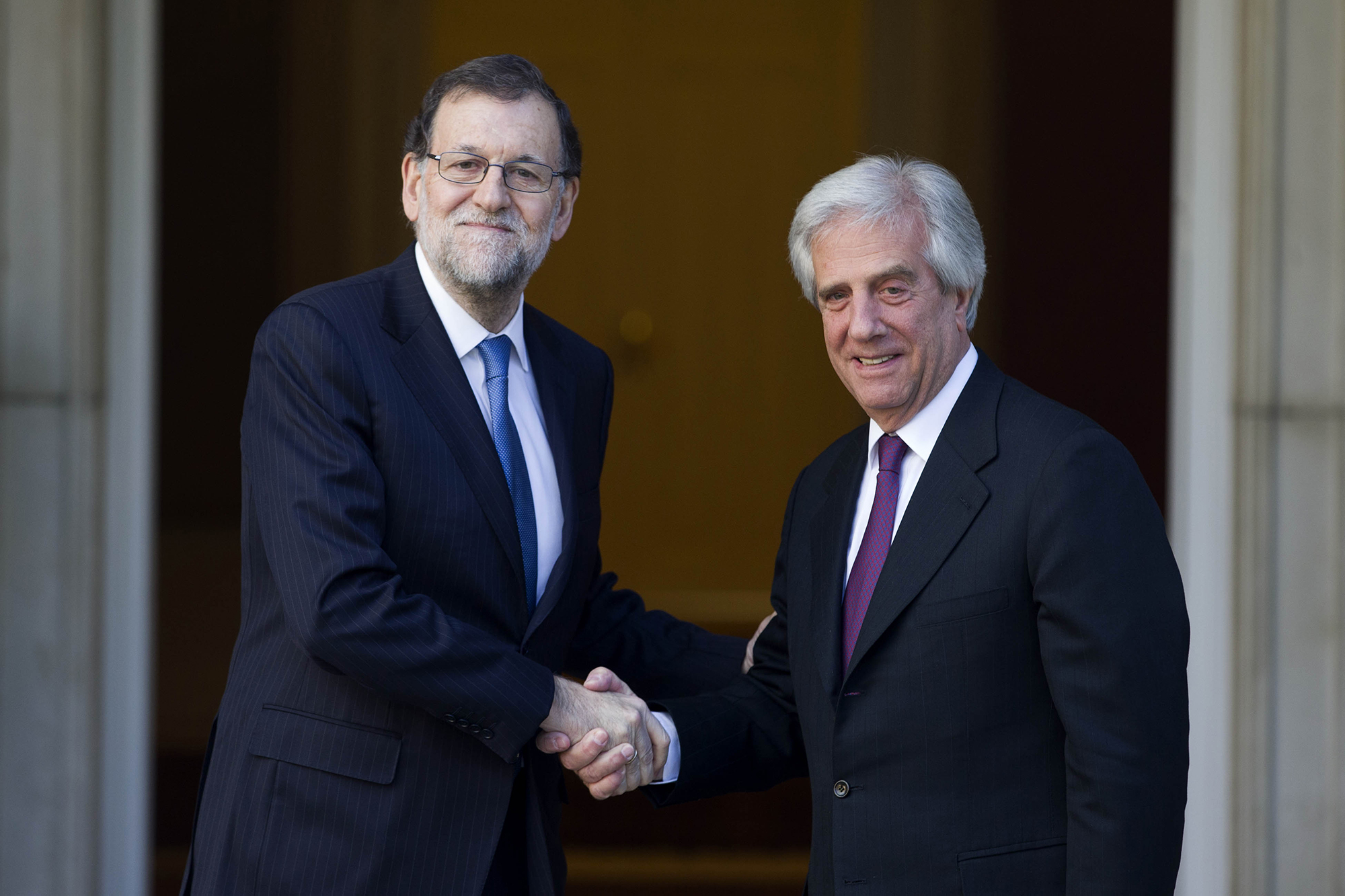
Spanish Prime Minister Mariano Rajoy and Uruguayan President Tabaré Vázquez in Madrid; 2016.

Royal and Prime Ministerial visits from Spain to Uruguay

- King Juan Carlos I (1983, 1996, 2006)
- Prime Minister Felipe González (1987)
- Prime Minister José María Aznar (1998)
- Prime Minister José Luis Rodríguez Zapatero (2006, 2007)
- Crowned Prince Felipe (2010)
- Prime Minister Mariano Rajoy (2017)
- King Felipe VI (2020, 2025)
- Prime Minister Pedro Sánchez (2025)

Presidential visits from Uruguay to Spain

- President Julio María Sanguinetti (1986, 1989)
- President Luis Alberto Lacalle (1992)
- President Tabaré Vázquez (2005, 2016, 2020)
- President Jorge Batlle (2004)
- President José Mujica (2013)
- President Yamandú Orsi (2025, 2026)

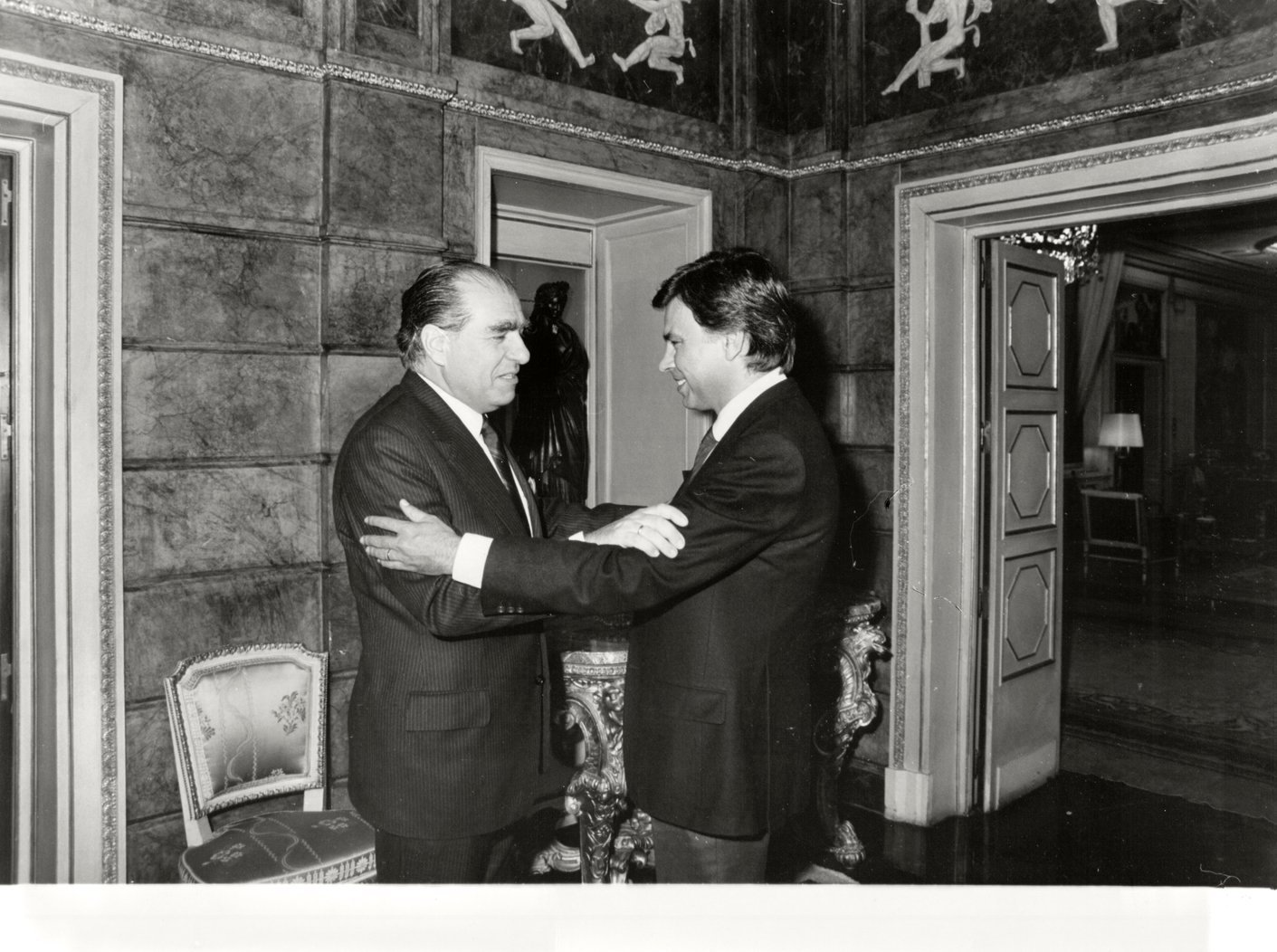
Prime Minister Felipe González and President Julio María Sanguinetti in Madrid; 1989.

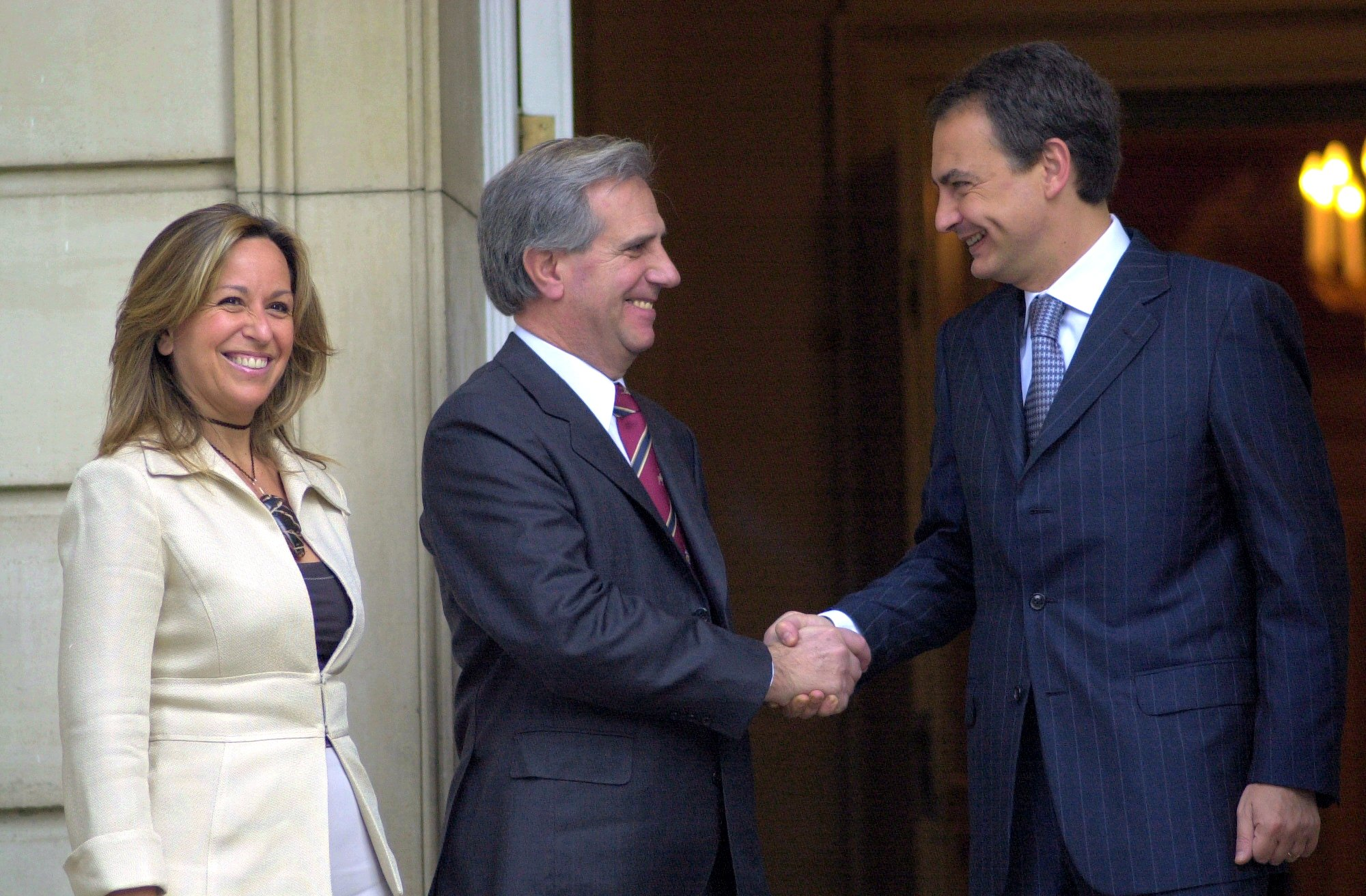
Presidential candidate Tabaré Vázquez and Prime Minister José Luis Rodríguez Zapatero in Madrid; 2004.

== Bilateral relations ==
Over the years, both nations have signed numerous agreements such as a Treaty on Arbitration (1922); Treaty of Trade (1957); Elimination of visas (1961); Treaty on Cultural Exchanges (1964); Tourism Agreement (1969); Atomic Energy Agreement for Peaceful Purposes (1979); Investment Protection Agreement (1992); Extradition Treaty (1996); Agreement to avoid Double Taxation (2011) and a Cooperation in Defense Agreement (2015).

== Transportation ==
There are direct flights between Madrid and Montevideo with Air Europa and Iberia airlines.

== Trade ==
In 2024, trade between Spain and Uruguay totaled €466 million Euros. Spain has US$470 million worth of investments in Uruguay. Spanish multinational companies such as Banco Bilbao Vizcaya Argentaria, Banco Santander, Mapfre and Zara (among others) operate in Uruguay.

== Resident diplomatic missions ==
of Spain in Uruguay

- Montevideo (Embassy)
- Montevideo (Consulate-General)

of Uruguay in Spain

- Madrid (Embassy)
- Madrid (Consulate-General)
- Barcelona (Consulate-General)
- Las Palmas (Consulate-General)
- Santiago de Compostela (Consulate-General)
- Valencia (Consulate-General)

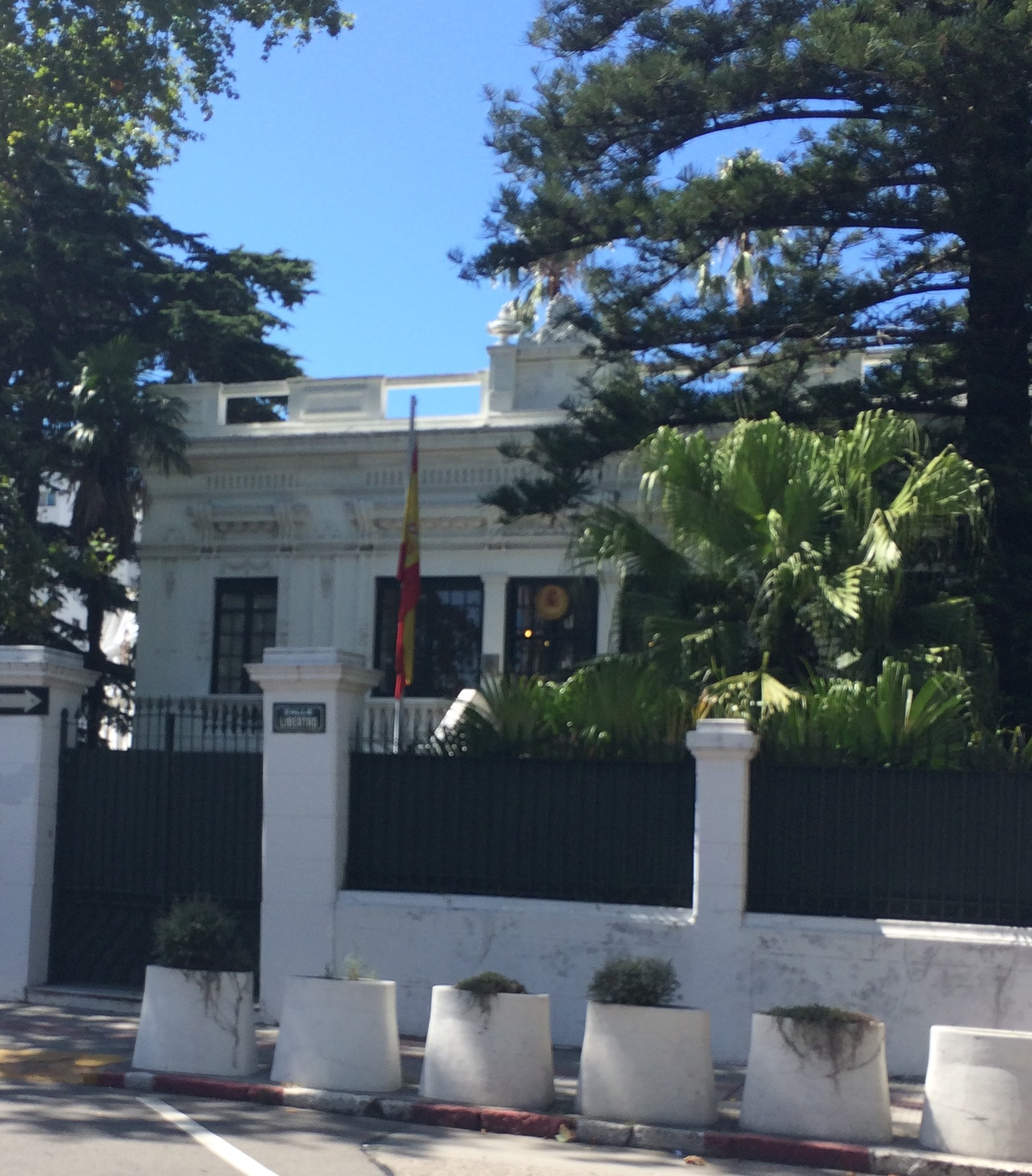
Embassy of Spain in Montevideo
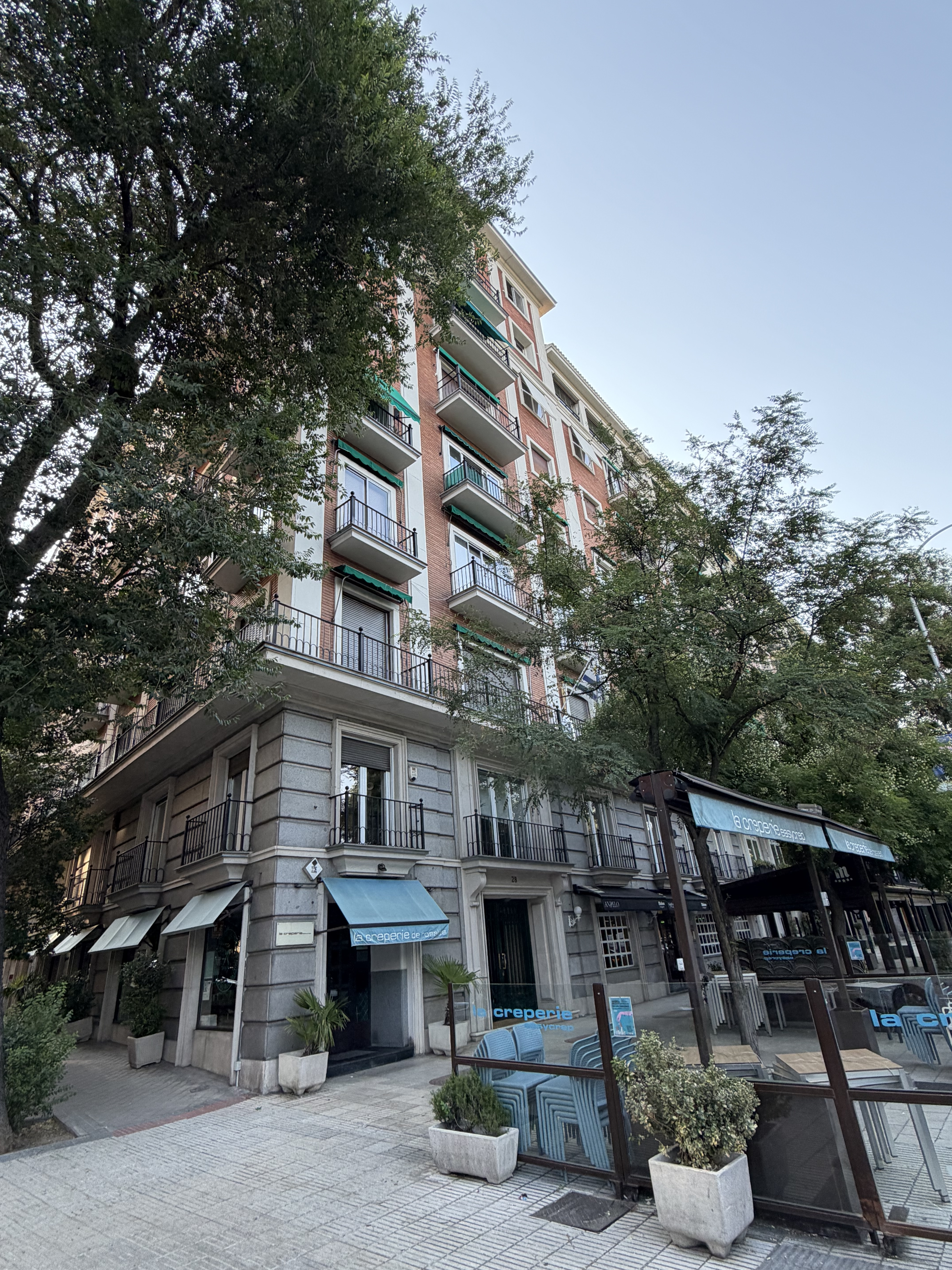
Building hosting the Embassy of Uruguay in Madrid

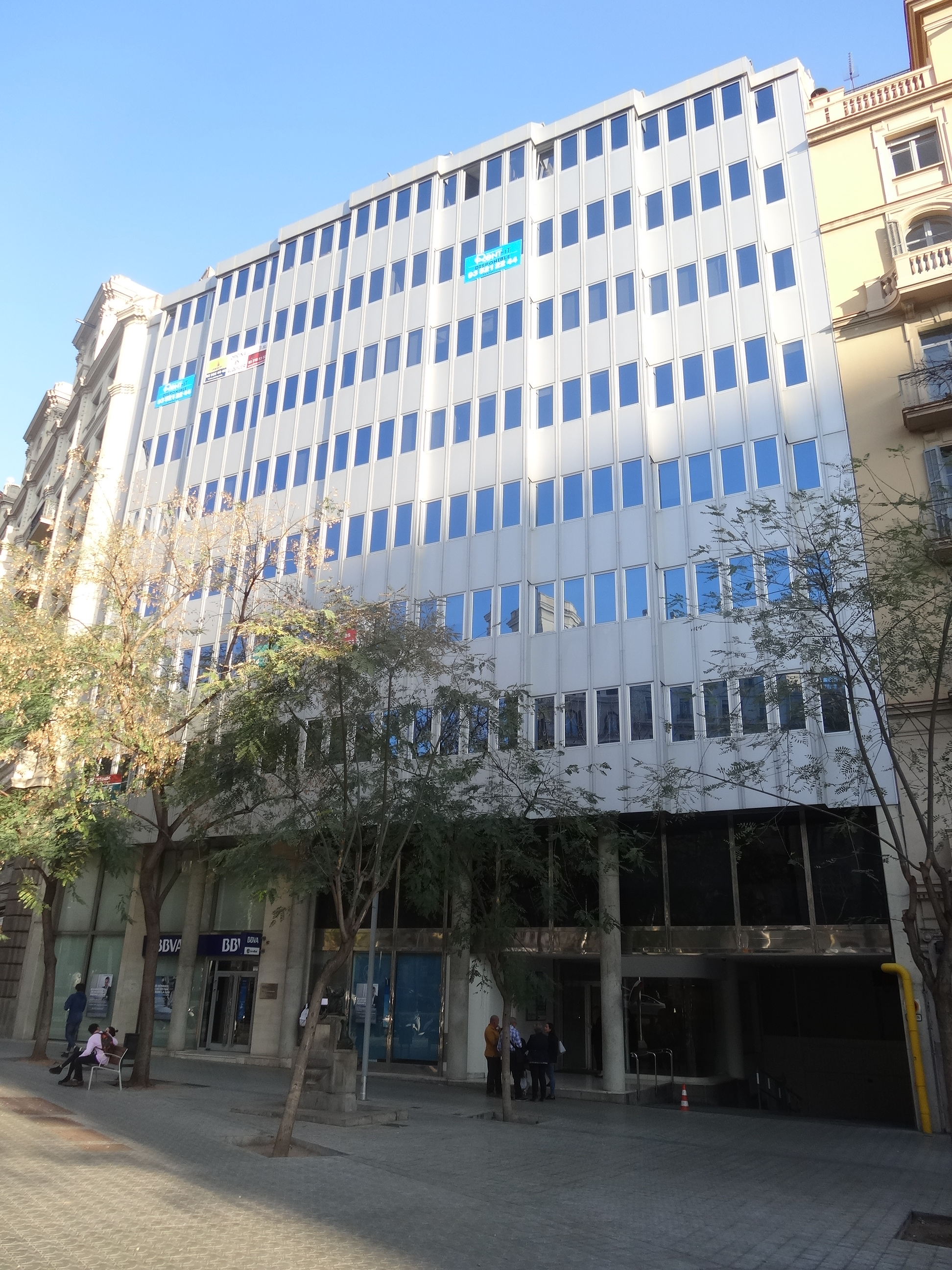
Building hosting the Consulate-General of Uruguay in Barcelona

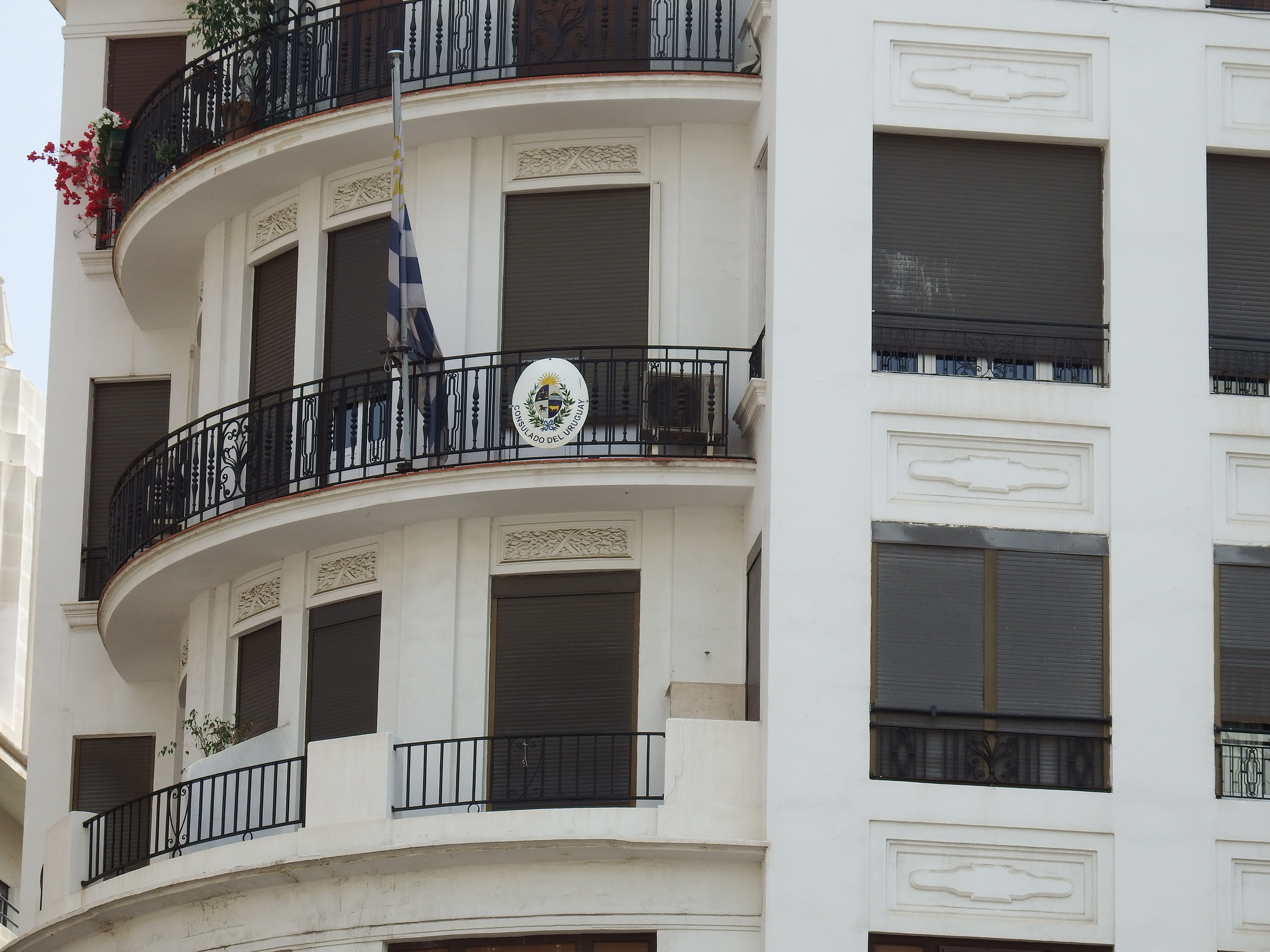
Consulate-General of Uruguay in Valencia

== See also ==
- Spanish Uruguayans
- Uruguayans in Spain
