= Alberto Domínguez (cyclist) =

Uruguayan-Australian cyclist and radio host

- Domínguez working in radio
- Born: 12 July 1934; Montevideo, Uruguay
- Died: 11 September 2001 (aged 67); North Tower, World Trade Center, New York City, U.S.
- Cause of death: Plane crash as part of the September 11 attacks
- Citizenship: Uruguay; Australia
- Occupations: Radio host cyclist (formerly)

Alberto Domínguez (12 July 1934 – 11 September 2001), known as El Pocho, was a Uruguayan and Australian professional cyclist, radio host, and community organiser. He competed for two clubs in Uruguay, where he won a national competition in 1953.

On 11 September 2001, Domínguez was aboard American Airlines Flight 11 and died along with the rest of passengers and crew when the hijackers crashed the plane into the North Tower of the World Trade Center in Manhattan. He was one of 10 Australians killed in the 11 September attacks.

== Early life ==
Born in Montevideo, Uruguay, on 12 July 1934, Domínguez grew up in the Montevideo neighbourhood of Buceo. In his youth, he graduated as a technician and an electrician, working since the age of 16 for the local government in Montevideo. In 1955, Domínguez married Marta Barboza, with whom he had four children: three sons and a daughter.

== Career ==
Domínguez was a well-renowned cyclist in Uruguay, competing for Club Ciclista América and later for Club Unión Ciclista, winning a national tournament in Uruguay in 1953 with Club Unión. He later represented Uruguay at the 1956 Summer Olympics as part of a team along Alberto Velázquez and Rodolfo Rodino. Domínguez also took part in the 1959 Pan American Games in Chicago, Illinois, and in the 1963 Pan American Games in São Paulo, Brazil. Walter Cabral, a teammate, later remembered Domínguez as a "happy guy" and an "excellent person" who was always willing to help others.

In November 1973, shortly after that year's coup d'état in Uruguay, Domínguez immigrated to Australia with his wife and children as part of a group of refugees escaping the civic-military dictatorship. The family settled in Sydney, where Domínguez worked for the state railway company. He joined Qantas, Australia's flag carrier, where he worked as a baggage handler.

Domínguez was also involved in radio, working for the SBS Radio service in Spanish. His distinctive Rioplatense Spanish made him a popular host in SBS Radio Spanish service, helping Uruguayans immigrating to Australia to feel comfortable while adapting to the language and lifestyle.

A community organiser in Sydney, Domínguez founded Uruguayos Unidos, an organisation aimed at collecting money for hospitals, schools, and other types of medical centres in Uruguay. Among his community services to the Uruguayan diaspora, Domínguez invited Uruguayans in Sydney to watch soccer games at his home. Known for his sense of humour, Domínguez referred to himself as a "Spanish-speaking Australian".

== 11 September attacks ==
Some weeks before the September 11 attacks, Domínguez and his wife Marta had travelled to the United States to spend time with Marta's sister, who was recovering from a recent surgery. By early September, Domínguez had to go back to work in Australia; his wife decided to stay longer with her sister. Initially, Domínguez had planned to take a flight on 10 September, but postponed the trip to the following day.

On 11 September 2001, Domínguez boarded American Airlines Flight 11 at Logan International Airport in Boston. The flight's destination was Los Angeles, California, where he intended to board another flight to Sydney. That morning, led by Egyptian Mohamed Atta, five members of al-Qaeda, took control of Flight 11 at around 8:14 a.m. (EST) as part of large-scale attacks.

Flight 11 was the first of the four planes to be hijacked that morning. The assailants deliberately flew the plane into the North Tower of the World Trade Center at 8:46 a.m. (EDT), killing everyone on board.

Virginia, Domínguez's daughter, was at her home in Lidcombe, New South Wales, and had just returned from a movie theatre. Given time zone differences, it was around 10:45 p.m. (AEST) when she returned home and saw the news on TV. Some minutes later, Virginia's brother Álvaro called her, saying that their father "might have been on board the first flight." In the following hours, Virginia kept calling her aunt Milka in Boston, as well as the American Airlines hot line, but she was never able to connect with an operator. Álvaro called her again at night and said that their relatives in Boston had confirmed that Alberto was on board Flight 11.

== Aftermath ==
Alberto Domínguez's remains were not found until April 2007, when the Coroner's Office in New York City positively identified him through DNA testing. Domínguez's remains were found on top of a building on Liberty Street, in south Manhattan. His remains continued to reside in the Coroner's Office until his daughter Virginia travelled to New York for the 10th anniversary of the attacks in September 2011 and took her father's remains back to Australia. Domínguez's son Álvaro said that the news after the positive DNA identification came to his family as a "bucket of cold water". His sister Reina, who resided in Colonia del Sacramento, expressed relief at the finding of her brother's remains.

In an interview to press, Virginia said that she did not hold contempt for the terrorists involved in the 11 September attacks, though she admitted that she felt relief when Osama bin Laden was killed by US forces in May 2011 in Abbottabad, Pakistan. However, Virginia added that she would have preferred bin Laden captured alive and brought before a court to give answers as to the motives for the attacks. Noellia Scarone, Domínguez's granddaughter, said that every year on 11 September she felt overwhelmed by remembering how her grandfather died, stating that Domínguez was a strong male figure in her life after her father divorced her mother (Virginia) and moved to Spain.

While taking part in the events of the 10th anniversary in 2011, Virginia expressed gratitude for the accompaniment and support offered by the United States and the Australian Governments in the aftermath of her father's death. She, however, lamented that the government of Uruguay had never called her family to express condolences or support. Speaking about compensations to the victims and their families, Virginia recalled an argument that she had with US official Kenneth Feinberg, the chief of staff of the September 11th Victim Compensation Fund. She said that she felt that the committee did not consider all lives to be equal, arguing that the Fund deduced the payments based on the age, health issues, and work life of the victims.

Rubén Fernández, a colleague of Domínguez at SBS Radio, recalled that the day of the attacks, the computer of a colleague of his at the SBS Radio office had a frozen blue screen which read: "Former Uruguayan cyclist champion dead in the September 11 attacks." Soraya Caicedo, an executive producer of SBS Radio, echoed seeing the blue screen on the computer of that employee, adding that they immediately called Domínguez's family to confirm his death.

Domínguez was honoured by an Australian Broadcasting Corporation note which highlighted him as someone who "helped Latinos adapt to the Australian lifestyle", adding that he had been a prominent Latino even before Puerto Rican singer Ricky Martin or Jennifer Lopez who, ABC said, "made of Latinos a trend". Conversely, some Uruguayan media lamented that the main Australian media services briefly remembered Domínguez as an "immigrant" in Australia.
