= Bill Boyer Jr. =

American businessman

Bill Boyer Jr. is a 50% owner and former CEO of Hawaii's Mokulele Airlines. In March 2009, he was replaced as the airline's CEO and was put in charge of expanding sales and marketing efforts after Republic Airways became a 50% shareholder. Boyer is a native of Tacoma, Washington.

== Background ==
Boyer, who dropped out of college, was an entrepreneurial-minded baggage handler at Seattle-based Alaska Airlines who, in response to information posted about in-flight entertainment challenges on the Alaska Airlines employee website, conceived of a portable hard-disk based video on demand media player that he later named the "digEplayer." On behalf of Aircraft Protective Systems (APS), a Washington corporation he founded earlier to commercialize other products he developed for the aircraft industry, he obtained $2.5 million initial financing from family and an Angel investor to fully develop and market his conceived product, which became the first self-contained portable video on demand (VOD) in-flight Entertainment (IFE) device. He contracted with San Diego–based e.Digital Corporation to develop and manufacture the device.

Boyer was able to convince 20th Century Fox to provide first-run movies and other studio content for the player. Boyer's then employer, Alaska Airlines, became the first customer for the APS digEplayer. Based upon the apparent success of the Alaska Airlines digEplayer implementation, APS was able to sell the digEplayer to additional airlines.

In August 2003, Boyer signed an exclusive marketing and distribution agreement with Springville, Utah–based aircraft parts distributor Wencor and two months later sold the company to Wencor, which renamed APS "digEcor."

In 2005, Boyer purchased Mokulele Airlines through newly formed Boyer Industries LLC, a Washington company.

== Recognition ==
Boyer's digEplayer received the "IFE Product of the Year" award at the March 2004 IPEC/LARA Inflight Online Awards Dinner. Alaska Airlines received the "Airline IFE Service of the Year" based upon the implementation of the digEplayer.
