= Venezuelans in Uruguay =

- (Venezuela) (Uruguay)

Total population
- 33,000

Regions with significant populations
- Montevideo

Languages
- Venezuelan Spanish, Uruguayan Spanish

Related ethnic groups
- Venezuelan people, Venezuelan diaspora

Venezuelans in Uruguay are people born in Venezuela who live in Uruguay, or Uruguayan-born people of Venezuelan descent.

According to official data, over 12,000 Venezuelans entered Uruguay in 2016.

Recent estimates as of 2023 have recorded the Venezuelan population in Uruguay to have tripled to about 33,000 with a five-year span.

== Overview ==
There are many Venezuelan-born individuals living in Uruguay, for a number of reasons. Both countries share the Spanish language; their historical origins are common (part of the Viceroyalty of the River Plate, Spanish Empire); both countries are members of MERCOSUR, there is no need for special migration documents, and circulation is relatively easy. It is also easy for Venezuelans to obtain permanent residence in Uruguay.

Uruguay is a very small, quiet country, with wide beaches on the Atlantic Ocean, so many well-off Venezuelans choose Uruguay as their usual holiday destination, some of them even as permanent residence. Other Venezuelans of a lower social condition come to Uruguay in search of job opportunities, as part of a big inflow of Latin Americans coming to Uruguay.

The 2011 Uruguayan census revealed almost 1,000 people who declared Venezuela as their country of birth. As of 2013, there were 62 Venezuelan citizens registered in the Uruguayan social security. In 2015, more and more Venezuelans are coming to Uruguay, running away from their uncertain future; some ask for political asylum. Among schoolchildren born abroad, Venezuelans are the fourth-biggest group, among 62 countries that are represented in Uruguayan schools.

Lately, there are some young Venezuelan immigrants who have tried politics in different political parties.

== Gastronomy ==
Venezuelans are strongly influencing gastronomy in Montevideo with their arepas, tequeños, Hallacas, cachapas and other foods.

== See also ==
- Uruguay–Venezuela relations
- Uruguayans in Venezuela
- Immigration to Uruguay
