= Spanish Uruguayans =

Ethnic group

Spanish Uruguayans Hispano-uruguayo
Regions with significant populations
- Throughout Uruguay

Languages
- Rioplatense Spanish · Galician · Catalan · Basque

Religion
- Roman Catholicism · Others

Related ethnic groups
- Spanish Argentines

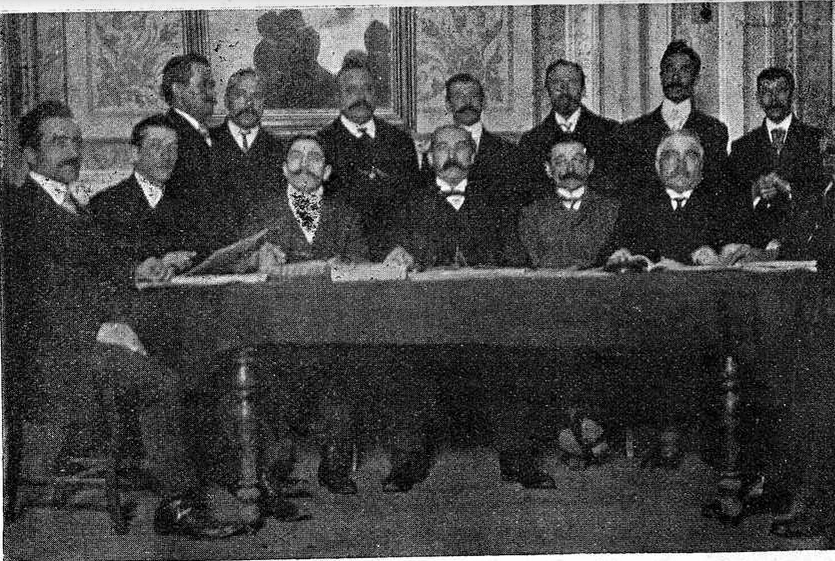
Galician immigrants at the Centro Gallego in Montevideo, in 1909.

Spanish Uruguayans (Spanish: hispano-uruguayos) are Uruguayans whose ancestry originates wholly or partly from Spain. They are the longest-established European group in the country, as Spanish immigrants began arriving during the colonial period, prior to independence, when administrative roles were held by European-born settlers and criollos under Spanish rule. Along with the massive waves of immigration in the 19th and 20th centuries, it is estimated that around 70–80% of the Uruguayan population has Spanish ancestry to varying degrees.

Following independence, Spaniards—together with Italians—were the principal source of immigration from the mid-19th century onward, forming a foundational pillar of modern Uruguayan culture and society. In relative terms, Uruguay received the highest number of Spanish immigrants in proportion to its population.

== History ==
=== Colonial era ===
Spanish presence in the territory of present-day Uruguay dates back to the 16th century, when Juan Díaz de Solís led an expedition to the Río de la Plata in 1516, becoming the first European known to have reached the estuary. In 1611, Hernando Arias de Saavedra introduced livestock to the region, laying the foundations for the development of cattle ranching and increasing the territory's economic importance. This development contributed to territorial disputes between the Spanish and Portuguese empires.

In 1725, the Council of the Indies, with the approval of King Philip V, authorized the dispatch of 25 families from the Canary Islands to settle in the region. They embarked on August 9, 1726, and arrived on November 19 of that year, participating in the establishment of Montevideo under the leadership of Bruno Mauricio de Zabala, a Basque military officer and colonial administrator. By the outbreak of the revolution in 1811, most European settlers in the Banda Oriental were Spanish-born or of Spanish descent and played prominent roles in the colonial administration, the Catholic Church, and commercial life. Over time, a substantial Criollo population of Spanish descent had emerged in the region's settlements. Some Spanish settlers and their descendants also had children with Indigenous peoples (mestizos), enslaved Africans (mulattoes), and other Europeans, although racial mixing was less extensive than in other parts of the Americas, partly due to the relatively small Indigenous population.

Spanish settlement along with the Italians, formed the backbone of today's Uruguayan society. The culture of Uruguay exhibits significant connections to Spanish culture; in terms of language, customs and traditions.

=== Post independence ===
ollowing Uruguay's independence, Spaniards became one of the country's main immigrant groups, with approximately 33,300 arriving between 1835 and 1845, when the country's total population was still fewer than 100,000. Most came from the Canary Islands, Galicia, the Spanish Basque Country, and Catalonia, and worked primarily in agriculture and the meat-salting industry.

By 1850, the growing Spanish community had begun to establish a network of associations and institutions to meet its social and healthcare needs, including the Spanish Mutual Aid Association and the Spanish Hospital. Meanwhile, continued immigration contributed to the establishment and growth of settlements throughout the country, some of which would later develop into cities. The 1860 census reflected the community's significance, with people of Spanish origin accounting for 23.8% of Uruguay's foreign-born population, more than half of whom came from Galicia and Asturias.

During the late 19th and early 20th centuries, Spanish immigration to Uruguay increased as part of a broader wave of European migration to the country. This movement was encouraged in part by the promotion of Uruguay in Spain as a promising destination for emigrants seeking economic opportunities and the prospect of prosperity in the Americas, as well as by accounts of indianos—emigrants who returned to Spain after achieving economic success in the Americas—which helped foster the perception of the region as a land of opportunity. According to the 1908 census, Spanish immigrants accounted for 30% of Uruguay's foreign-born population, ranking second only to Italians, who made up 34%.

Galician and Basque communities became prominent in Uruguay during the early 20th century. The large number of Galician immigrants who settled in the country led to the widespread use of gallego (Galician) to refer to Spaniards regardless of their region of origin. Spanish immigrant communities established numerous associations and cultural centers in Montevideo and other parts of the country, preserving their regional identities and cultural traditions.

Migration continued during the early decades of the 20th century, facilitated by support networks and the relative ease of obtaining the documentation required to regularize newcomers' legal status. The flow intensified following the outbreak of the Spanish Civil War and the establishment of Francisco Franco's dictatorship. Between 1946 and 1958, 37,043 people from Spain settled in Uruguay, including migrants from regions with a long history of emigration to the country, as well as growing numbers of Valencians. The period also saw the arrival of Republican exiles fleeing the war and the subsequent dictatorship.

== Present ==
The 2011 Uruguayan census revealed 12,776 people who declared Spain as their country of birth. Thousands of Uruguayan nationals are holders of Spanish passports.

== See also ==
- Spain–Uruguay relations
- Uruguayan people
- Criollo people
- White Latin Americans
- Spanish colonization of the Americas
- Uruguayans in Spain

== Bibliography ==
- Goebel, Michael. "Gauchos, Gringos and Gallegos: The Assimilation of Italian and Spanish Immigrants in the Making of Modern Uruguay 1880–1930," Past and Present (August 2010) 208(1): 191–229 doi:10.1093/pastj/gtp037
