= Carlo Cattaneo (mathematician) =

Italian mathematician and physicist (1911–1979)

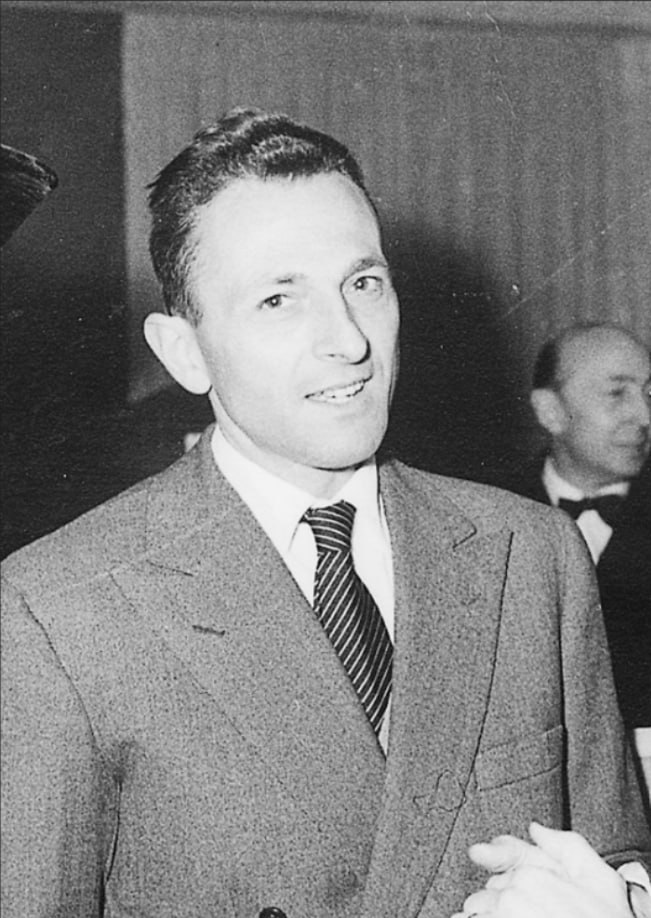
Image of Cattaneo Carlo

Carlo Cattàneo (31 October 1911, San Giorgio Piacentino – 7 March 1979, Rome) was an Italian academic and one of the general relativity theorists and mathematical physicists in the 1960s and 1970s. He made contributions to general relativity theory, fluid mechanics, and elasticity theory.

After secondary and university studies in Rome, Cattaneo received a laurea (PhD) in civil engineering in 1934 and a laurea (PhD) in mathematics in 1936 from the University of Rome. In 1938, he was appointed an assistant and in 1940 a docent at the University of Rome. From 1949 to 1957, he was a professor at the University of Pisa. In 1957, he was appointed a professor at the University of Rome, where he worked under the guidance of Tullio Levi-Civita. Cattaneo remained a professor at the University of Rome for the rest of his life.

Cattaneo was the author of introductory textbooks on classical mechanics, fluid mechanics and the theory of relativity. His textbooks were widely used in Italy and made him known as an author or co-author of the best-known college textbooks in the field of mathematical physics in Italy.

Cattaneo also appears to have been the first to develop a hyperbolic model for heat conduction in 1948. The resulting constitutive equation relating the heat flux and its time rate of change to the temperature gradient has become known as the "Maxwell–Cattaneo law" because James Clerk Maxwell suggested a similar relation in 1867.

From 1972 to 1976, Cattaneo was vice-president of the Comitato Nazionale della Matematica (National Committee of Mathematics) of the Consiglio Nazionale delle Ricerche (National Research Council) of Italy. He was elected a member of the International Committee on General Relativity in 1962. He received an honorary doctorate from the University of Lille and was elected a member of the Accademia dei Lincei. His doctoral students include Carlos Aragone.
