= DigEplayer =

digEcor
- Type: Private
- Industry: Inflight Entertainment
- Founded: Washington
- Founder: Bill Boyer Jr.
- Headquarters: Brisbane, Australia, U.S.
- Area served: World
- Services: Hardware, Content, Shopping, Advertising
- Website: www.burrana.aero

The "digEplayer" is a product line of "digEcor." digEplayers are self-contained, portable audio video on demand (AVOD) hard-disk–based digital entertainment devices. Similar in size to a portable DVD player, digEplayers are pre-programmed with movies, television shows, cartoons, videos and music, as well as airport maps, destination information, promotions and advertising.

The digEplayer was the first portable self-contained AVOD In-flight entertainment (IFE) device and created a whole new IFE product category.

== Product history ==
The digEplayer was the brainchild of Tacoma, Washington, native and entrepreneur Bill Boyer Jr., who at the time was a baggage handler at SeaTac–based Alaska Airlines. In response to information posted about in-flight entertainment challenges on the Alaska Airlines employee website, Boyer conceived of a portable hard-disk–based audio video on demand media player that he later named the digEplayer.

On behalf of Aircraft Protective Systems (APS), a Washington corporation he founded earlier to commercialize other products he developed for the aircraft industry, he obtained $2.5 million initial financing from family and an Angel investor to fully develop and market his conceived product, which became the first self-contained portable AVOD in-flight entertainment (IFE) device.

Boyer/APS contracted with San Diego–based e.Digital Corporation to develop and manufacture the original digEplayer, dubbed the digEplayer 5500. e.Digital engaged Korean OEM Digitalway to do the industrial hardware design. Additionally, e.Digital licensed video encoding and encryption security from DivX, Inc. and licensed other media player technology from Ittiam Systems. Digitalway was also the original manufacturer of the digEplayer 5500 until e.Digital transferred manufacturing to Maycom Co.

Boyer was able to convince 20th Century Fox and later other studios to provide first-run movies and other content for the player. Boyer's employer, Alaska Airlines, became the first customer for the digEplayer, Based upon the apparent success of the Alaska Airlines digEplayer implementation, APS was able to sell the digEplayer to additional airlines.

digEcor later created the digEplayer XT and digEplayer XLP products as part of the digEplayer product line. The digEplayer XT was originally designed by Triad System Engineering but was revamped and extended by digEcor.

In 2010, digEcor introduced the digEplayer L-Series to the aviation industry with the release of the digEplayer L7 and L10. Manufactured by Lafeel Media Technologies in China, the digEplayer L7 sports a 7" screen while the L10 delivers a 10" display, thus the naming derivative: 'L' for Lafeel and the number designation for the relative size of the screen.

In February 2011, Minneapolis-based Sun County Airlines announced that it would introduce the digEplayer L7 for domestic flights longer than three hours. The carrier will also begin offering the digEplayer L7 on flights to London on May 27, 2011. Azerbaijan Airlines, Thomas Cook and Danish charter airline Jet Time have also announced plans to introduce the digEplayer L7 on their flights.

== Company history ==
digEcor was founded by Bill Boyer Jr. originally as Aircraft Protective Systems, Inc. (APS) – a Washington corporation. Boyer and his investors sold all stock in APS to Utah-based Wencor, an international aircraft parts distributor, in October, 2003. Wencor renamed Washington-based APS "digEcor" and moved its headquarters to Springville, Utah.

digEcor's ownership was later donated to three non-profit organizations.

August 2013, digEcor was sold to Total Aviation Solutions of Australia.

In January 2019, digEcor officially acquired the Rockwell Collins Air Transport In Flight Entertainment (IFE) business to form Burrana.

== Recognition ==
The digEplayer 5500 received the "IFE Product of the Year" award at the March 2004 IPEC/LARA Inflight Online Awards Dinner. Alaska Airlines received the "Airline IFE Service of the Year" based upon the implementation of the digEplayer 5500.

== Legal dispute ==
=== digEcor vs. e.Digital Corporation ===
In March 2006, digEplayer supplier e.Digital announced that its contract manufacturer, Maycom, was either unwilling or unable to fulfill a purchase order it had placed to fulfill a fully paid order from digEcor for 1,250 digEplayer 5500s and batteries.

In May 2006, digEcor, filed a lawsuit against e.Digital regarding non-delivery of the purchase order placed in November, 2005. digEcor sought, among other things, actual damages of $793,750 and consequential damages of not less than $1,000,000. e.Digital eventually delivered the players to digEcor without batteries in October 2006 and the parties entered into a partial settlement agreement reducing the actual damages claim to $80,000 for the undelivered batteries.

digEcor also sought an injunction barring e.Digital from engaging in any competition with digEcor until after 2009, alleging violation by e.Digital of an April 2002 agreement not to compete with digEcor for a period of seven years it entered into with Bill Boyer Jr., original owner of digEcor (then named APS) and conceiver of the product and business model.

On September 10, 2009, the Court ruled against digEcor and dismissed all of its remaining claims against e.Digital. On October 15, 2009, the court modified its previous summary judgement to reflect the court's award of $80,000 in favor of digEcor and against e.Digital for undelievered batteries.

- General reference for section: eDigital Corporation Annual Report (10-K), 6/29/2007

== Source articles ==
- 'Sky's the limit for a baggage handler's in-flight entertainment system" - Seattle PI, September 10, 2003
- "Alaska To Become First Carrier to Offer APS DigEPlayer Portable Video On Demand Entertainment System"- Alaska Airlines Press Release, 9/9/2003
- "DigEplayer Portable VOD Big Hit With Alaska Air Passengers" – AIRFAX.com, February 2004
- "Flight of fancy? Launching a high-tech product can be a technical and financial challenge. Try these tips to get yours off the ground". Entrepreneur. 32 (8). August 2004. Archived from the original on February 28, 2006 – via FindArticles.
