= Sweden–Uruguay relations =

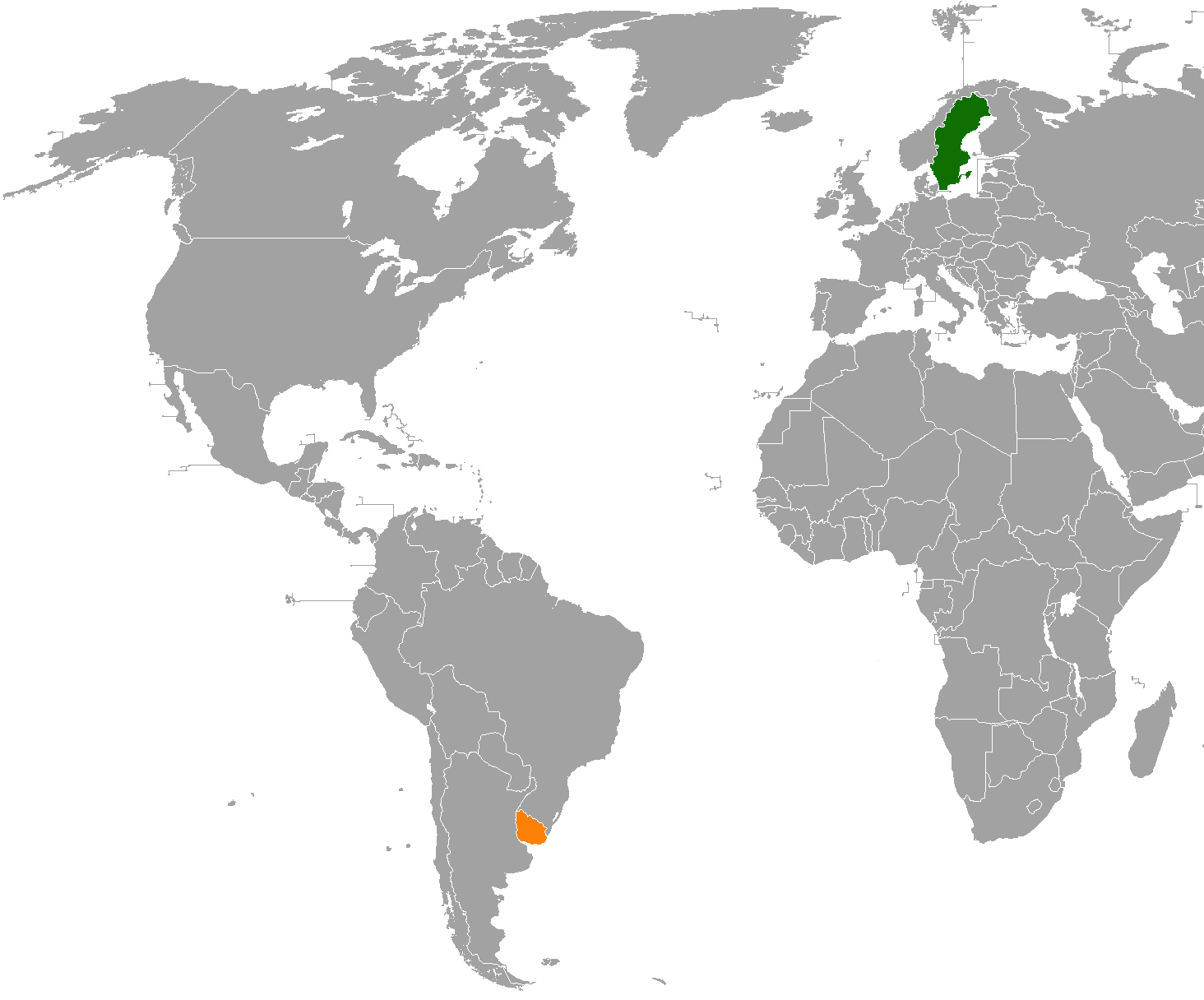
- Sweden: Uruguay

Sweden–Uruguay relations are the bilateral relations between Sweden and Uruguay. Sweden has a consulate in Montevideo; the Swedish ambassador in Buenos Aires is concurrent to Uruguay. Uruguay has an embassy in Stockholm, the ambassador being concurrent to Norway, Denmark, Finland, Latvia and Estonia.

== Overview ==
Sweden was an important refuge for Uruguayan exiles during the civic-military dictatorship (1973-1985); there are several Uruguayans who still live in Sweden.

Currently there is a Uruguayan-Nordic Chamber of Commerce.

== State visits ==
In October 2011, Uruguayan President José Mujica paid an official visit to Sweden.

== Resident diplomatic missions ==
- Sweden is accredited to Uruguay from its embassy in Buenos Aires, Argentina.
- Uruguay has an embassy in Stockholm.

== See also ==
- Foreign relations of Sweden
- Foreign relations of Uruguay
- Uruguayans in Sweden
