= Uruguay–Venezuela relations =

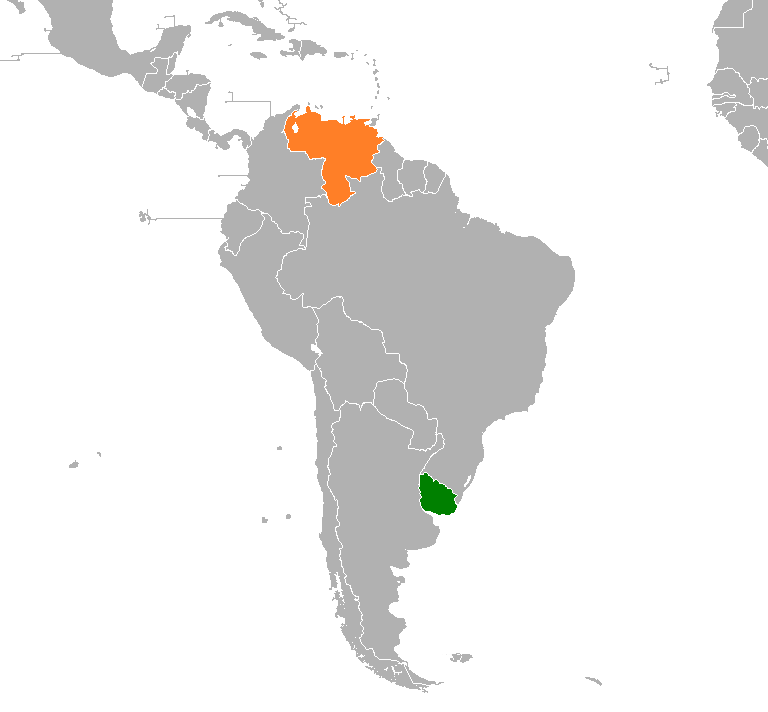
- Uruguay: Venezuela

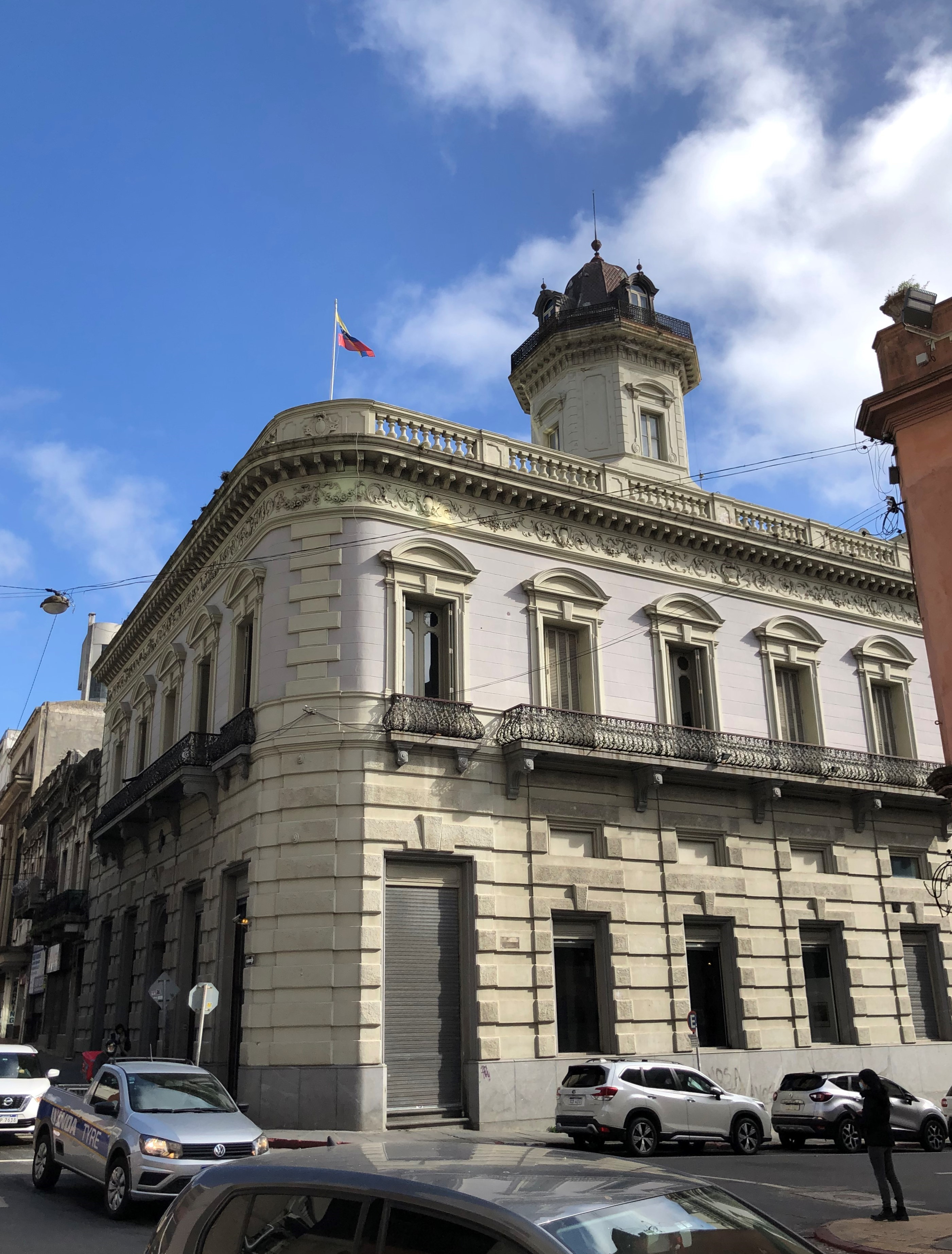
Embassy of Venezuela in Montevideo

The nations of Uruguay and Venezuela established diplomatic relations in 1891.

In 29 of July of 2024, Venezuela announced a breakup of diplomatic relations with Uruguay, as because of the critical positioning of the Uruguayan government about fraud reports that occurred in 2024 Venezuelan presidential election. In June 2025, both nations re-opened diplomatic missions in each other's countries, respectively.

== History ==
Historically, both countries were part of the Spanish Empire until the early 19th century. Nowadays, both countries are full members of the Rio Group, of the Latin Union, of ALADI, of the Association of Spanish Language Academies, of the Organization of American States, of the Organization of Ibero-American States, of the Community of Latin American and Caribbean States, of the Union of South American Nations and of the Group of 77.

Relations between both countries are not easy. The ruling Broad Front had an official position of support for the regime of Nicolás Maduro, while opposition politicians flatly denounced its human rights violations. Lately, the Uruguayan diplomat Luis Almagro, who in his role as Secretary General of OAS denounced the Venezuelan situation, was facing harsh questioning inside his party.

In September 2020, the Foreign Minister of the Uruguayan new center-right government of President Luis Lacalle Pou said that the Venezuelan Nicolás Maduro regime is a dictatorship and that Uruguay would no longer encourage dialogue with the Maduro regime.

== Resident diplomatic missions ==
- Uruguay has an embassy in Caracas.
- Venezuela has an embassy in Montevideo.

== See also ==
- Foreign relations of Uruguay
- Foreign relations of Venezuela
- Elena Quinteros
- Uruguayans in Venezuela
- Venezuelans in Uruguay
