= Line technician (automotive) =

In the field of automotive repair, the term "line technician" or "heavy line technician" is a reference to "driveline technician" and is used mainly in dealerships. The term heavy line technician is due to these mechanics specializing in the engine and transmission issues, and they are usually the more experienced mechanics. Light line or line mechanic is more suited to general mechanical issues like water pumps, alternators, power steering, brakes, suspension systems, and other areas of the vehicle. Light line techs will usually move into heavy line tech as they master the job of repair to vehicles. These terms have been used throughout the industry, and vehicle repair involves "applied science", in particular electrical theory, fluid dynamics, chemistry, metallurgy, and physics and an understanding of all areas of current design in vehicles used in North America. The heavy line tech is the jargon used in the industry that would denote a top-level mechanic, and more recently an ASE Master Mechanic with longtime experience, who concentrate on major engine and transmission repairs. "ASE" is the "National Institute for Automotive Excellence". They are the largest organization presently to test and certify mechanics in the US. They have many areas of testing, including engine repair, automatic transmission/manual transaxle, suspension and steering, brakes, heating and air conditioning, and engine performance. They have many other testing and certification programs, including truck specialist and parts specialist.
