= Ana Luisa Valdés =

Uruguayan writer and social anthropologist

Ana Luisa Valdés (born 1953) is a Uruguayan writer and social anthropologist. Due to her involvement in the Tupamaros guerrilla group, she was exiled to Sweden from 1978 until 2014, when she returned to Uruguay. In addition to her work as an author, translator, and journalist, Valdés has been active in the promotion of museum digitization.

== Biography ==
Ana Luisa Valdés was born in Montevideo, Uruguay, in 1953. As a teenager, she began studying to become a lawyer at the Instituto Batlle y Ordóñez School. However, at age 19 she was arrested for being a member of the Tupamaros, a left-wing urban guerrilla group. After being held as a political prisoner for four years by the military dictatorship, Valdés went into exile in Sweden in 1978.

It was in Stockholm that Valdés began her professional life. She studied social anthropology at the Stockholm University. As an active member of the Uruguayan exile community in Sweden, she helped found the Editorial Nordan printing house, a project of the Comunidad del Sur anarchist collective. She also edited the Swedish-language publication Ágora in the 1980s and '90s.

In 1984, Valdés was chosen to join the leadership of Sweden's PEN Club, and she later participated in international projects on minority languages and literatures, translations, and literary rights for the organization. She was also selected as a member of the Swedish Arts Council. As a representative of Sweden, she traveled to Brussels to help draft language on the multicultural internet and digital democracy for the European Commission.

In her writing career, Valdés has produced around a dozen books, including poetry, biography, and works on digital culture and democracy. Her first book, La guerra de los albatros, won first prize at a competition held by the Casa del Uruguay in Paris. Her narrative works El intruso and El navegante combine the autobiographical and the mythical, and feminism is fundamental to her literary work. However, it took her several decades to be ready to write a direct memoir of her early years, including her time as a political prisoner, which was published in 2008 in Swedish and in 2014 in Spanish.

Valdés has also worked as a journalist for such publications as Brecha in Uruguay and Dagens Nyheter, Ordfront, and Feministiskt Perspektiv in Sweden. In 1996, she co-founded the digital magazine Ada, named for Ada Lovelace. She has also written from Gaza on the Israeli-Palestinian conflict, and she organized the first major gathering of Palestinian intellectuals in Oslo in 2011. In addition to her own writing, which she produces in both Spanish and Swedish, Valdés has translated a number of works between the two languages.

Valdés has also specialized in the digitalization of museum collections and cultural heritage, organizing seminars and curating expositions in Latin America, Asia, and the Middle East.

== Selected works ==
- Su tiempo llegará (2014)
- El navegante (1993)
- El intruso (1990)
- Palabras para nadie (1988)
- Después de Alicia (1986)
- La guerra de los albatros (1983, reissued in 1986)

=== Translations ===
- Conversaciones con el enemigo by Pierre Schori (2015).
- Kalocaína by Karin Boye (1988), in collaboration with Anahy Cabrera
