= Line technician (aviation) =

A line tech attaches a tow bar to a small private jet

A line technician (commonly known as a line tech, line guy, gas jockey or ramp rat) is someone who works on an airport ramp at a fixed-base operator (FBO), a business that typically handles general aviation aircraft as opposed to commercial traffic. Their technical responsibilities include coordinating ramp operations and aircraft movement via radio, marshalling, fueling, towing aircraft, operating ground support equipment, servicing aircraft, potable water and lavatory systems, checking and maintaining proper aircraft engine oil and tire pressure levels, sampling aviation fuel for quality control, conducting deicing operations, and performing runway inspections. Customer service-related responsibilities include greeting and assisting passengers, loading baggage, providing coffee, ice, newspapers, and catering to the aircraft, driving rental cars to and from the aircraft, and providing ground transportation around the airfield. The most notable corporation that handles these services is Swissport and the runner-up is Service Air.
