= Carlos Aragone =

Carlos Aragone Salveraglio (1937–1994) was a Latin American physicist.

He was born in Montevideo, Uruguay, and studied at the University of the Republic there. He then went to Italy where he obtained his Laurea degree in 1967 working with Carlo Cattaneo on Hamiltonian methods in general relativity at the University of Rome. He returned to Montevideo in 1968 and in collaboration with Luis Saravia he modernized the old Institute of Physics at the University of the Republic and created an active research group in field theory and relativity. He was also instrumental in the creation of a regional committee on gravitational physics, the COLARG, which led to a regular regional conference on gravitational physics, the SILARG, the first one taking place in Montevideo in 1971. He also was instrumental in the consolidation of the Latin American Center for Physics (CLAF), which supports research activities in the region. He was the president of the board of directors of CLAF from 1976 to 1985.

In 1971 in the wake of the coup d'état in Montevideo, he left for Venezuela to become a member of the at the time recently created Universidad Simon Bolivar, in Sartenejas valley, Miranda state, near Caracas. There he helped develop one of the most active physics departments in research in Latin America at the time. With In 1978 he was awarded with the prestigious Guggenheim Fellowship. From 1982 to 1985 Aragone was director of the Astronomical Research Center (CIDA), located in Apartaderos in Merida State.

Carlos published 77 research papers in his career. He was one of the pioneers of the light front approach to gauge theories. His research also led him to consider higher spin theories, supergravity and general relativity. He also made important contributions in quantum optics where he introduced the notion of minimal-uncertainty states with angular momentum, the well-known intelligent spin states. He was the mentor of many Latin American Physicists.

== Publications ==
A complete list of publications can be found here.
