= Standby (air travel) =

Flying without a reservation

On most modern airlines, flying standby is when a passenger awaiting at the portline without a seat assignment waits at the gate to see if there is an available seat after all scheduled passengers have boarded. There are several common circumstances in which passengers fly standby:

- A prospective passenger is not booked on the flight, but waits to see if there is an available seat after all scheduled passengers have boarded.
- A missed flight requires a passenger to fly standby on the next flight to the same destination, as they now lack a reservation.
- A passenger who is already booked on a flight arrives at the airport early (accidentally or deliberately) and asks to be on standby for an earlier flight. If a standby seat doesn't open up, they just take their original booked flight. The industry calls this a go-show.
- A ticketed passenger requests to stand by for an upgrade. Many airlines, particularly in the United States, give free space-available domestic upgrades to first class to their elite tier fliers. If first class sells out or upgrades go to higher-tiered passengers, elite fliers can stand by in the event a first-class seat becomes available due to a cancellation, no-show, misconnect, irregular operation, or equipment change. If a passenger clears for an upgrade, they may receive a new boarding pass at the gate. Some airlines, such as American and United, have gate-side monitors that show the upgrade and general standby list, and announce when first class is full (no further upgrades are available).
- If a flight is overbooked, an airline may designate all passengers without a seat assignment as "standby" prior to boarding.

== History ==
Airline employees and some of their family and friends can also travel standby, often for free or at a significant discount, known as non-rev (short for non-revenue) or staff travel. They typically have lower priority than regular passengers, and are given a seat after all regular fare passengers have seats. Standby passengers may also have to vacate their seat for a full fare-paying customer.

Non-employees can get on the standby list by speaking to a ticket agent or gate agent. This must usually be done in person at the airport, and not over the phone. When the flight boards, agents give any available seats to standby passengers, who wait at the gate to be called. Standby passengers who don't get seats are rolled into the standby list for the next flight. Standby passengers typically have priority based on how much they paid for their tickets and their relative status in the airline's frequent flyer program.

A person who paid full fare has higher priority than someone who purchased a 21-day advance fare, who, in turn, has higher priority than someone who just showed up hoping to board the plane. Some low-cost carriers, Southwest Airlines in particular, have policies that only allow full fares to standby (unless the passenger's original flight was delayed). This means that someone with a discounted airfare, like a Web-only fare or 14-day advance ticket is ineligible to fly standby unless they upgrade to a full-fare ticket.

Standby for earlier flights began as a free service on many airlines, but as of April 2010, most US airlines charge for unconfirmed standby, with a US$50 to US$75 fee being common. Currently, United Airlines charge US$75 for standby travel to all passengers except passengers on full fare tickets, 1K passengers, Global Services passengers, and premium cabin passengers. American Airlines offers unconfirmed standby for an earlier flight free of charge to all passengers, but typically charges a fee for confirmed standby. American Airlines also restricts standby for later flights to members with elite status or fully refundable tickets. In all cases, distressed passengers (passengers who were unable to board their original flight due to cancellation, overbooking, misconnection, etc, not due to their own fault) get free standby and highest priority.
